= The Fire Meets the Fury Tour =

1989 concert tour

- Tour by Stevie Ray Vaughan and Double Trouble
- Promotional poster for the tour
- Location: North America
- Associated album: In Step
- Start date: October 25, 1989
- End date: December 3, 1989
- Legs: 1
- No. of shows: 30

Stevie Ray Vaughan and Double Trouble concert chronology
- Live Alive Tour (1986–88); The Fire Meets the Fury Tour (1989); In Step Tour (1989–90)

The Fire Meets the Fury Tour is a 1989 concert tour co-headlined by Stevie Ray Vaughan and Jeff Beck. Epic Records paired the two guitarists together for a 30-date concert tour starting in Minneapolis, Minnesota. This tour was the third leg of the Stevie Ray Vaughan and Double Trouble In Step Tour. In addition to being one of the highest-grossing concert tours of 1989, The Fire Meets the Fury Tour won the Pollstar magazine award for most creative tour package of the year.

The bands rehearsed at Prince's Paisley Park Studios on October 23 and 24, before beginning the tour at the Northrup Auditorium on October 25, 1989. Both Vaughan and Beck were advertised as headliners and received equal billing for the tour. In order to ensure equal billing, Vaughan and Beck alternated headline spots. Vaughan's manager Alex Hodges commented: "We were very careful to have equal billing and everything done in a way that it would be hard to say anyone was taking advantage of the other." Jeff Beck won a coin flip by lighting designer Andy Elias and was named the headline act for the opening show in Minneapolis. During the final show on December 3 in Oakland, California, in which Jeff Beck was the opening act, Carlos Santana joined Stevie Ray Vaughan on stage while playing a borrowed Stratocaster.

== Touring personnel ==
Bands:

Stevie Ray Vaughan and Double Trouble

- Stevie Ray Vaughan (guitars, vocals)
- Chris Layton (drums)
- Tommy Shannon (bass)
- Reese Wynans (keyboards)

Jeff Beck with Terry Bozzio and Tony Hymas

- Jeff Beck (guitars)
- Terry Bozzio (drums)
- Tony Hymas (keyboards)

Management/tour staff:

- Paul "Skip" Rickert (tour manager)
- Mark Rutledge (production manager)
- Bill Mounsey (stage manager)
- René Martinez (guitar technician)
- John "Bondo" Bond (keyboard technician)
- Johnny "JW" Roberts (monitor engineer)
- Andy Elias (set/lighting designer)
- Gary Kudrna (sound technician)
- Randy Bryant (sound technician)
- Richard Luckett (tour merchandise manager)
- Alex Hodges/Strike Force (talent management/Stevie Ray Vaughan)
- Ernest Chapman (talent management/Jeff Beck)

== Videos ==
- Video from The Fire Meets the Fury Tour at the UIC Pavilion in Chicago (10/28/1989)
- Video of 1989 MTV Interview with Stevie Ray Vaughan and Jeff Beck

== Typical setlists ==
Jeff Beck with Terry Bozzio and Tony Hymas

1. "Savoy"
2. "Guitar Shop"
3. "Big Block"
4. "Sling Shot"
5. "Behind the Veil"
6. "Freeway Jam"
7. "Where Were You"
8. "Day in the House"
9. "Stand on It"
10. "Goodbye Pork Pie Hat" (Charles Mingus cover)
11. "Blue Wind"
12. "People Get Ready" (The Impressions cover)
13. "Going Down" (Alabama State Troopers cover)

Stevie Ray Vaughan & Double Trouble

1. "The House Is Rockin'"
2. "Tightrope"
3. "Look at Little Sister" (Hank Ballard cover)
4. "Mary Had a Little Lamb" (Buddy Guy cover)
5. "Let Me Love You Baby" (Buddy Guy cover)
6. "Texas Flood" (Larry Davis cover)
7. "Wall of Denial"
8. "Superstition" (Stevie Wonder cover)
9. "Couldn't Stand the Weather"
10. "Cold Shot"
11. "Riviera Paradise"
12. "Life Without You"
13. "Crossfire"
14. "Voodoo Child (Slight Return)" (The Jimi Hendrix Experience cover)

== Tour dates ==
Date	City	Country	Venue
October 25, 1989	Minneapolis	United States	Northrop Auditorium
October 27, 1989	Milwaukee	United States	Milwaukee Auditorium
October 28, 1989	Chicago	United States	UIC Pavilion
October 29, 1989	St. Louis	United States	Fox Theatre
October 31, 1989	Columbus	United States	Battelle Hall
November 1, 1989	Montreal	Canada	Montreal Forum
November 2, 1989	Toronto	Canada	SkyDome
November 3, 1989	Detroit	United States	Cobo Hall
November 4, 1989	Pittsburgh	United States	A. J. Palumbo Center
November 6, 1989	Landover	United States	Capital Centre
November 7, 1989	Philadelphia	United States	The Spectrum
November 8, 1989	Worcester	United States	The Centrum
November 11, 1989	New York City	United States	Madison Square Garden
November 12, 1989	Troy	United States	Houston Field House
November 14, 1989	Cleveland	United States	Public Auditorium
November 15, 1989	Trotwood	United States	Hara Arena
November 16, 1989	Louisville	United States	Louisville Gardens
November 18, 1989	Birmingham	United States	Boutwell Memorial Auditorium
November 19, 1989	Atlanta	United States	The Omni
November 21, 1989	Miami	United States	Miami Arena
November 22, 1989	Tampa	United States	USF Sun Dome
November 24, 1989	Houston	United States	Sam Houston Coliseum
November 25, 1989	Dallas	United States	State Fair Coliseum
November 26, 1989	Austin	United States	Frank Erwin Center
November 27, 1989	Amarillo	United States	Amarillo Civic Center
November 28, 1989	Albuquerque	United States	Tingley Coliseum
November 29, 1989	Denver	United States	McNichols Sports Arena
December 1, 1989	Los Angeles	United States	Los Angeles Memorial Sports Arena
December 2, 1989	Sacramento	United States	Arco Arena
December 3, 1989	Oakland	United States	Oakland Coliseum Arena

== Sources ==
- Hopkins, Craig (2011). Stevie Ray Vaughan – Day by Day, Night After Night: His Final Years, 1983–1990. Backbeat Books. ISBN 978-1-61774-022-0.
