= In Step Tour =

1989–90 concert tour by Stevie Ray Vaughan and Double Trouble

- North American concert tour by Stevie Ray Vaughan and Double Trouble
- Promotional poster for the tour
- Location: United States, Canada
- Associated album: In Step
- Start date: May 4, 1989
- End date: August 26, 1990
- Legs: 6
- No. of shows: 136

Stevie Ray Vaughan and Double Trouble concert chronology
- Live Alive Tour (1986–88); In Step Tour (1989–90)

The In Step Tour was a concert tour through the United States and Canada, undertaken by American blues rock band Stevie Ray Vaughan and Double Trouble from 1989 to 1990. Launched in support of their fourth and final studio album In Step, this was the third tour to include keyboardist Reese Wynans, who joined the band in 1985. Stevie Ray Vaughan and Double Trouble achieved international fame when their debut album, Texas Flood, was released in June 1983. Throughout their subsequent concert tours, the group's success was confirmed as their performances consistently amazed and gratified their audiences. Similar to their previous tours, the In Step Tour was a minimalist production. The stage featured a simple light show that changed according to the mood of certain songs performed. Although Vaughan and Double Trouble never followed a set list, all ten songs from In Step were played at least once during the tour, and as many as seven of them were included in each of the band's performances.

Consisting of six legs and 136 shows, the In Step Tour began on May 4, 1989, in Vancouver and ended on August 26, 1990, in East Troy, Wisconsin. After the first two legs, Vaughan and Double Trouble co-headlined with Jeff Beck and Joe Cocker during the third and fifth legs, which were branded as "The Fire Meets the Fury" and "Power and Passion", respectively. The group had planned to embark on a European leg in September 1990, but it was canceled after Vaughan died in a helicopter crash following the East Troy concert on August 27, 1990, during a return flight to Chicago. Although the tour elicited a variety of reactions from music critics, it was generally well-received and garnered mostly favorable reviews. Along with being one of the highest-grossing concert tours of 1989, "The Fire Meets the Fury" leg was awarded for being the most creative tour package of the year by Pollstar magazine.

== Background ==
Stevie Ray Vaughan and Double Trouble gained international fame after the release of their debut studio album Texas Flood in June 1983. Their second studio album, Couldn't Stand the Weather, and the supporting tour brought them to further commercial and critical success during the following year. After the addition of keyboardist Reese Wynans in 1985, the band released Soul to Soul and toured in support of the album, which was their first as a quartet. In Europe, the schedule of performances were canceled after Vaughan suffered from a substance abuse related illness, due to a long-term drug and alcohol addiction. He checked into a rehabilitation facility in Atlanta, where he stayed for four weeks and achieved sobriety; bassist Tommy Shannon checked into rehab in Austin.

Following their departure from rehab, Vaughan and Shannon reconvened with Double Trouble to begin the Live Alive Tour in November 1986, which supported the album that was released on November 17. Although Vaughan was nervous about performing while being sober, he received positive reassurance. Wynans recalled: "[He] had a little bit of self doubt. We rehearsed and were very encouraging to him." As the tour progressed, Vaughan was longing to work on material for the group's next LP, but in January 1987, he filed for a divorce from his wife Lenny, which restricted him of writing songs and recording an album for almost two years. After the proceedings were finalized in 1988, the band started recording their fourth and final studio album, In Step, at Kiva Studios in Memphis, where they worked with producer Jim Gaines.

Vaughan initially had doubts about his musical and creative abilities, but he gained more confidence as the sessions progressed. Shannon later recalled: "From my eyes, he went in scared to death ... In Step was, for him, a big growing experience." On January 21, 1989, the band took a break from recording and performed at a presidential inaugural celebration for George H. W. Bush in Washington, D.C. When the sessions concluded, they participated in a concert organized by the Greenpeace organization, which took place on April 8, 1989, at the Mount Smart Supertop in Auckland, New Zealand.

== Touring personnel ==
Band:

- Stevie Ray Vaughan (Guitars, Vocals)
- Chris Layton (Drums)
- Tommy Shannon (Bass)
- Reese Wynans (Keyboards)

Management/Tour Staff:

- Paul "Skip" Rickert (Tour Manager)
- Mark Rutledge (Production Manager)
- Bill Mounsey (Stage Manager)
- Andy Elias (Set/Lighting Designer)
- René Martinez (Guitar Technician)
- John "Bondo" Bond (Keyboard Technician)
- Doug Alexander (Monitor Engineer)
- Trey Hensley (Lighting Technician)
- Dan Stuart (Lighting Technician)
- Gary Kudrna (Sound Technician)
- David Conyers (Sound Technician)
- Alex Hodges/Strike Force (Talent Management)

== Planning, itinerary, and billing ==
A rehearsal for the In Step Tour took place on May 3, 1989, at York Theatre in Vancouver, before the opening show at the city's Orpheum Theatre on the following night. Lighting technician Trey Hensley explained that Vaughan decided against lengthy rehearsals: "The band played all the time and didn't need rehearsal, and he didn't believe in spending money to rehearse." Like many of the group's preceding tours, which began ahead of the release of a new album, the tour started a month before In Step was released, giving fans a preview of new songs from the album. The first leg of the tour alternated between both indoor and outdoor venues, with 15 concerts that were mostly indoor arena and theatre shows in May. After the release of In Step on June 13, the band performed 25 concerts throughout the United States and Canada from June to September.

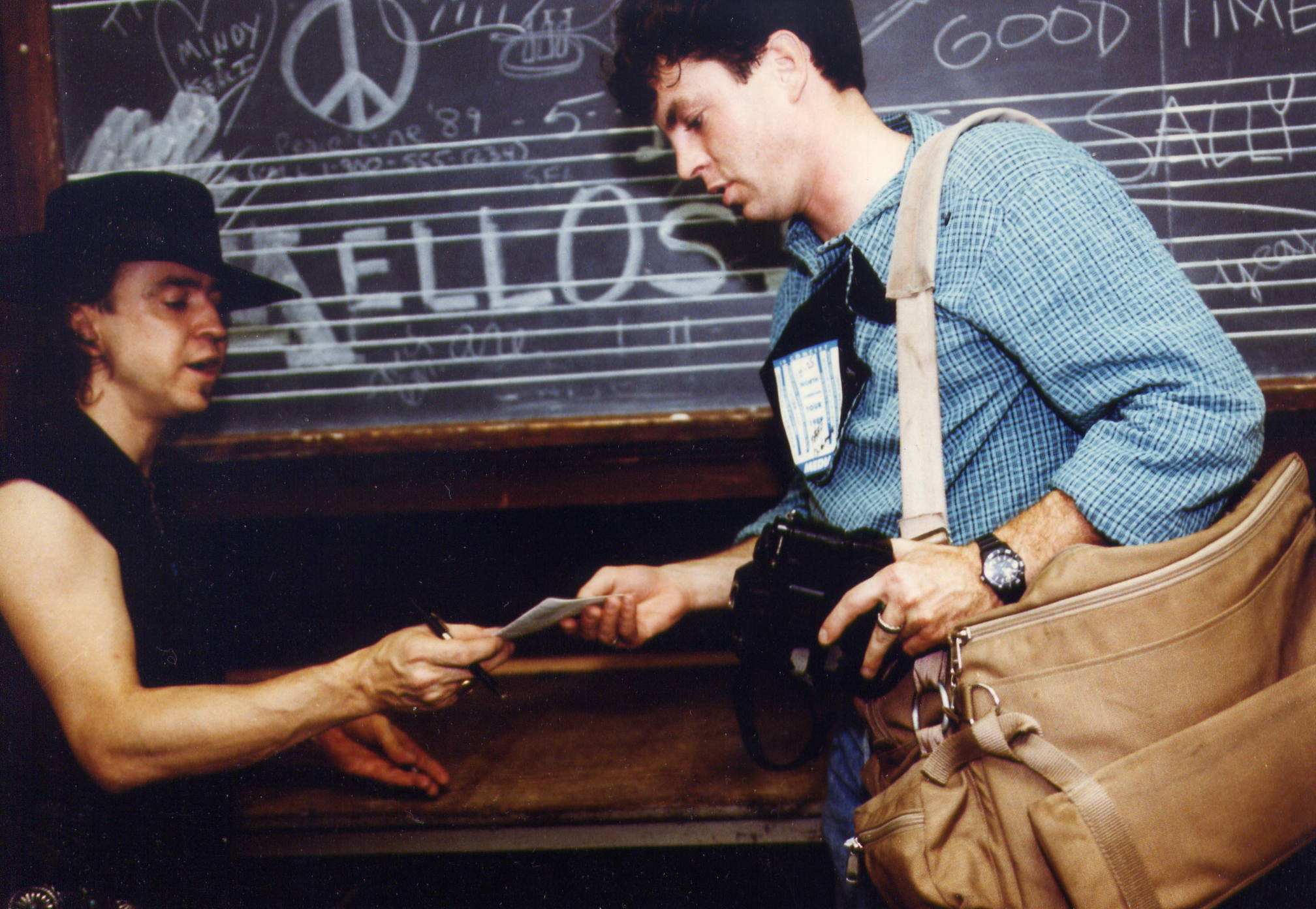
Vaughan signing an autograph for a fan after Double Trouble's show in Minneapolis on October 25, 1989

Two co-headlining legs in North America were subsequently planned—"The Fire Meets the Fury" with Jeff Beck from October to December 1989, and "Power and Passion" with Joe Cocker from June to July 1990. In preparation for the high-profile "The Fire Meets the Fury" leg of the tour, band management added Pennsylvania-based lighting designer Andy Elias to the touring staff. The simplistic light show was replaced with a more explosive design concept and state-of-the-art technology, featuring "intelligent" Vari*Lite lighting fixtures. Incoming lighting designer Andy Elias explained the band's new approach to visuals: "Before Stevie teamed up with Jeff, visual production was pretty low-key, basically lighting the stage with very few changes. The new concept tries to match Stevie's energy and stage presence."

Rehearsals for "The Fire Meets the Fury" began at Paisley Park Studios in Minneapolis on October 23 and 24, before the official leg-opening Northrup Auditorium show on October 25. Both Vaughan and Beck were advertised as headliners and received equal billing for the tour. Vaughan's manager Alex Hodges commented: "We were very careful to have equal billing and everything done in a way that it would be hard to say anyone was taking advantage of the other."

During an extended break between the third and fourth legs of the tour, Vaughan recorded Family Style with his brother Jimmie Vaughan in March 1990. They worked with producer Nile Rodgers at Ardent Studios in Memphis, and it would be their first and only collaboration. The album was ultimately released in September 1990, a month after Vaughan's death. With the success of "The Fire Meets the Fury," Hodges made arrangements for the "Power and Passion" leg with Cocker: "We weren't trying to repeat the magic of the tour with Beck, but we thought it was a way to have a strong summer tour and give the fans something different."

Following the conclusion of "Power and Passion", Vaughan took a short break from touring with Double Trouble. In August 1990, he traveled to Hawaii, Australia and New Zealand, where he spent time vacationing with girlfriend Janna Lapidus. She later recalled the trip: "It was all one big barrel of laughs! We were goofballs." Shortly after they had returned to their Manhattan apartment in New York City, Vaughan left for Kalamazoo, Michigan on August 24, where he reconvened with the band to perform at the county fair. They then moved on to East Troy, Wisconsin, where they were booked for two nights as the opening act for Eric Clapton at Alpine Valley Music Theatre. Both shows, on August 25 and 26, were sold out with an audience of 40,000 each. The second show concluded with an encore jam session featuring Vaughan, Clapton, Robert Cray, Buddy Guy and Vaughan's brother Jimmie Vaughan. In 1993, Clapton recalled Vaughan's performance: "[It was] beyond anything that I could even describe ... there was nothing missing. There was no room for improvement."

After the show, Vaughan talked with Layton backstage, where he expressed his gratification of the band's performances and optimism for the future of their career. Layton recalled the conversation: "He was in great spirits ... We talked for, I guess, almost thirty minutes." In the early morning of August 27, 1990, Vaughan and three members of Clapton's touring entourage boarded a Bell 206B, which was the third in a series of four helicopters to travel to Chicago's Midway Airport. The pilot, who was unqualified to operate a helicopter in foggy weather conditions, failed to gain enough altitude to fly the aircraft over a nearby ski hill, where it crashed shortly after takeoff. Vaughan and the four others on board were all killed instantly. The band had originally planned to visit England, France and Switzerland in September after being absent from the European touring circuit for over two years, but the rest of the tour was canceled. Vaughan was buried in his hometown of Dallas, Texas on August 31, 1990.

== Tour dates ==
List of concerts, showing date, city, country, venue, tickets sold, number of available tickets and amount of gross revenue
Date	City	Country	Venue	Opening Act(s)	Attendance	Revenue
North America
May 4, 1989	Vancouver	Canada	Orpheum Theatre	René Martinez	—N/a	—N/a
May 6, 1989	Everett	United States	Everett Civic Auditorium	Roy Rogers and the Delta Rhythm Kings	—N/a	—N/a
May 8, 1989	Bozeman		Brick Breeden Fieldhouse	Roy Rogers and the Delta Rhythm Kings	—N/a	—N/a
May 9, 1989	Missoula		Harry Adams Field House	Roy Rogers and the Delta Rhythm Kings	—N/a	—N/a
May 10, 1989	Boise		Morrison Center	Roy Rogers and the Delta Rhythm Kings	1,983 / 2,037	—N/a
May 12, 1989	Santa Barbara		Arlington Theatre	Roy Rogers and the Delta Rhythm Kings	—N/a	—N/a
May 18, 1989	Phoenix		Celebrity Theatre	Robin Trower	—N/a	—N/a
May 20, 1989	San Diego		Starlight Bowl	Robert Cray	4,013 / 4,013	$86,624
May 21, 1989	Santa Clara		Redwood Amphitheater	Roy Rogers and the Delta Rhythm Kings	—N/a	—N/a
May 22, 1989	Santa Rosa		Luther Burbank Center	Roy Rogers and the Delta Rhythm Kings	—N/a	—N/a
May 23, 1989	Sacramento		Community Center Theater		—N/a	—N/a
May 25, 1989	Eureka		Eureka Municipal Auditorium		—N/a	—N/a
May 26, 1989	Salem		L.B. Day Amphitheatre	John Hiatt	4,253 / 8,868	$78,861
May 27, 1989	George		Champs de Brionne Music Theatre	John Hiatt	10,495 / 12,000	$188,103
May 29, 1989	El Paso		Mountain Shadow Lakes	QID	—N/a	—N/a
North America
June 14, 1989	Ottawa	Canada	Ottawa Civic Centre	Drew Nelson	—N/a	—N/a
June 16, 1989	Toronto	Canada	Kingswood Music Theatre	The Razorbacks	—N/a	—N/a
June 17, 1989	Montreal	Canada	Centre Sportif	Colin James	—N/a	—N/a
June 20, 1989	Saratoga Springs	United States	Saratoga Performing Arts Center	Henry Lee Summer	—N/a	—N/a
June 21, 1989	Burlington	United States	Burlington Memorial Auditorium	Henry Lee Summer	—N/a	—N/a
June 24, 1989	Bristol	United States	Lake Compounce Festival Park	Henry Lee Summer	—N/a	—N/a
June 25, 1989	Mansfield	United States	Great Woods Center for the Performing Arts	Johnny Winter, John Mayall & the Bluesbreakers	—N/a	—N/a
June 27, 1989	Poughkeepsie	United States	Mid-Hudson Civic Center	Henry Lee Summer	—N/a	—N/a
June 29, 1989	Pittsburgh	United States	Melody Amphitheatre	Joe Grushecky and the Houserockers	3,739 / 4,000	$62,628
July 11, 1989	Wilkes-Barre	United States	F.M. Kirby Center	The Fabulous Thunderbirds	—N/a	—N/a
July 12, 1989	Darien	United States	Lakeside Amphitheater	Johnny Winter	—N/a	—N/a
July 14, 1989	Cleveland	United States	Nautica Stage	Frankie Starr & Chill Factor	—N/a	—N/a
July 15, 1989	Columbus	United States	Veterans Memorial Auditorium	Frankie Starr & Chill Factor	—N/a	—N/a
July 21, 1989	Toledo	United States	Toledo Zoo Amphitheatre	Stray Cats	—N/a	—N/a
July 22, 1989	Noblesville	United States	Deer Creek Music Center	Stray Cats, Duke Tumatoe and the Power Trio	—N/a	—N/a
July 23, 1989	Cincinnati	United States	Riverbend Music Center	Stray Cats	—N/a	—N/a
July 25, 1989	Memphis	United States	Mud Island Amphitheatre	Stray Cats	—N/a	—N/a
July 29, 1989	Hoffman Estates	United States	Poplar Creek Music Theatre	Stray Cats	—N/a	—N/a
July 30, 1989	Saint Paul	United States	Harriet Island Regional Park	Stray Cats, Dave Mason	—N/a	—N/a
August 1, 1989	Kansas City	United States	Starlight Theatre	Stray Cats	—N/a	—N/a
August 2, 1989	Evansville	United States	Mesker Amphitheatre	Stray Cats	2,113 / 8,500	—N/a
August 4, 1989	Columbia	United States	Merriweather Post Pavilion	Stray Cats	—N/a	—N/a
August 5, 1989	Syracuse	United States	Empire Court	Stray Cats	—N/a	—N/a
August 6, 1989	Old Orchard Beach	United States	Seashore Performing Arts Centre	Stray Cats	—N/a	—N/a
August 9, 1989	Halifax	Canada	Halifax Metro Centre	Stray Cats	—N/a	—N/a
August 10, 1989	Moncton	Canada	Moncton Coliseum	Stray Cats	—N/a	—N/a
August 12, 1989	Quebec City	Canada	Agora du Vieux-Port	René Martinez	—N/a	—N/a
August 13, 1989	Gardner	United States	Polish American Citizens Club	Johnny Copeland, Southbound	—N/a	—N/a
August 17, 1989	Clarkston	United States	Pine Knob Music Theatre	Joe Ely	—N/a	—N/a
August 18, 1989	Mears	United States	Val-Du-Lakes	Joe Ely	—N/a	—N/a
August 19, 1989	East Troy	United States	Alpine Valley Music Theatre	Little Feat, Jeff Healey	—N/a	—N/a
August 21, 1989	Morrison	United States	Red Rocks Amphitheatre	B.B. King, Taj Mahal	—N/a	—N/a
August 22, 1989	Park City	United States	Deer Valley	Taj Mahal	—N/a	—N/a
August 25, 1989	Concord	United States	Concord Pavilion	B.B. King	—N/a	—N/a
August 26, 1989	Los Angeles	United States	Greek Theatre	B.B. King	—N/a	—N/a
August 27, 1989	Los Angeles	United States	Greek Theatre	B.B. King	—N/a	—N/a
August 29, 1989	Tucson	United States	Tucson Music Hall	Jimmie Wood and the Immortals	—N/a	—N/a
August 30, 1989	Santa Fe	United States	Paolo Soleri Amphitheater	Chris Whitley	—N/a	—N/a
September 2, 1989	Houston	United States	Astrodome	The Fabulous Thunderbirds, Joe Ely	35,726 / 36,000	$803,835
September 3, 1989	Dallas	United States	Cotton Bowl	The Fabulous Thunderbirds, Joe Ely	35,385 / 36,000	$796,163
October 20, 1989	Phoenix	United States	Arizona Veterans Memorial Coliseum		—N/a	—N/a
North America ("The Fire Meets the Fury")
October 25, 1989	Minneapolis	United States	Northrop Memorial Auditorium		4,835 / 4,835	$90,088
October 27, 1989	Milwaukee	United States	MECCA Arena	Jeff Beck	4,651 / 5,500	$83,870
October 28, 1989	Chicago	United States	UIC Pavilion		8,407 / 8,407	$164,040
October 29, 1989	St. Louis	United States	Fox Theatre	Jeff Beck	—N/a	—N/a
October 31, 1989	Columbus	United States	Ohio Center		—N/a	—N/a
November 2, 1989	Toronto	Canada	SkyDome	Jeff Beck, Jeff Healey Band	11,778 / 15,000	$257,360
November 3, 1989	Detroit	United States	Cobo Center		10,841 / 12,191	$195,027
November 4, 1989	Pittsburgh	United States	A.J. Palumbo Center	Jeff Beck	6,200 / 6,200	—N/a
November 6, 1989	Landover	United States	Capital Centre		—N/a	—N/a
November 7, 1989	Philadelphia	United States	Philadelphia Spectrum	Jeff Beck	9,926 / 12,000	$177,900
November 8, 1989	Worcester	United States	Centrum in Worcester		13,101 / 14,000	$237,281
November 11, 1989	New York City	United States	Madison Square Garden	Jeff Beck	18,565 / 18,565	$417,713
November 12, 1989	Troy	United States	Houston Field House		—N/a	—N/a
November 14, 1989	Cleveland	United States	Cleveland Public Auditorium	Jeff Beck	7,995 / 7,995	$139,913
November 15, 1989	Dayton	United States	Hara Arena		—N/a	—N/a
November 16, 1989	Louisville	United States	Louisville Gardens	Jeff Beck	—N/a	—N/a
November 18, 1989	Birmingham	United States	Boutwell Auditorium		—N/a	—N/a
November 19, 1989	Atlanta	United States	Omni Coliseum	Jeff Beck	6,348 / 9,500	$111,090
November 21, 1989	Miami	United States	Miami Arena		7,783 / 8,500	$136,900
November 22, 1989	Tampa	United States	USF Sun Dome	Jeff Beck	—N/a	—N/a
November 24, 1989	Houston	United States	Sam Houston Coliseum		—N/a	—N/a
November 25, 1989	Dallas	United States	Fair Park Coliseum	Jeff Beck	—N/a	—N/a
November 26, 1989	Austin	United States	Frank Erwin Center		—N/a	—N/a
November 28, 1989	Albuquerque	United States	Tingley Coliseum	Jeff Beck	—N/a	—N/a
November 29, 1989	Denver	United States	McNichols Sports Arena		—N/a	—N/a
December 1, 1989	Los Angeles	United States	Los Angeles Memorial Sports Arena		13,734 / 16,511	$279,864
December 2, 1989	Sacramento	United States	ARCO Arena		8,184 / 8,184	$153,311
December 3, 1989	Oakland	United States	Oakland-Alameda County Coliseum Arena	Jeff Beck	13,178 / 13,178	$258,759
December 5, 1989	Vancouver	Canada	Orpheum Theatre		—N/a	—N/a
December 7, 1989	Seattle	United States	Paramount Theatre		—N/a	—N/a
December 8, 1989	Portland	United States	Arlene Schnitzer Concert Hall		—N/a	—N/a
December 31, 1989	New York City	United States	The Ritz	Roomful of Blues		
North America
April 13, 1990	Ann Arbor	United States	Michigan Theater	Ernie Isley	—N/a	—N/a
April 14, 1990	Ann Arbor	United States	Michigan Theater	Ernie Isley	—N/a	—N/a
April 17, 1990	Merrillville	United States	Star Plaza Theatre	Ernie Isley	—N/a	—N/a
April 18, 1990	Cedar Rapids	United States	Five Seasons Center	Ernie Isley	—N/a	—N/a
April 20, 1990	Fargo	United States	Fargo Civic Center	Ernie Isley	—N/a	—N/a
April 21, 1990	Sioux Falls	United States	Sioux Falls Arena	Ernie Isley	1,600 / 8,000	$29,600
April 22, 1990	Omaha	United States	Omaha Music Hall	Ernie Isley	2,585 / 2,608	—N/a
April 25, 1990	San Antonio	United States	HemisFair Park	Ernie Isley, Johnny Reno	—N/a	—N/a
April 28, 1990	Memphis	United States	Tom Lee Park	Etta James, Albert King, Johnny Winter	—N/a	—N/a
April 29, 1990	Tulsa	United States	River Parks Amphitheater	Ernie Isley	—N/a	—N/a
May 2, 1990	Oklahoma City	United States	Civic Center Music Hall	Ernie Isley	—N/a	—N/a
May 3, 1990	Abilene	United States	Taylor County Expo Center	Ernie Isley	—N/a	—N/a
May 4, 1990	Austin	United States	Auditorium Shores	Buddy Guy, Ernie Isley	—N/a	—N/a
May 6, 1990	New Orleans	United States	Fair Grounds Race Course	Boz Scaggs, BeauSoleil	—N/a	—N/a
North America ("Power and Passion")
June 8, 1990	Mountain View	United States	Shoreline Amphitheatre	Joe Cocker, Dr. John	—N/a	—N/a
June 9, 1990	Costa Mesa	United States	Pacific Amphitheatre	John Lee Hooker, Dr. John	17,385 / 18,861	$371,371
June 10, 1990	San Diego	United States	San Diego Sports Arena	Joe Cocker	—N/a	—N/a
June 13, 1990	The Woodlands	United States	Cynthia Woods Mitchell Pavilion		—N/a	—N/a
June 15, 1990	Atlanta	United States	Lakewood Amphitheatre	Joe Cocker	—N/a	—N/a
June 16, 1990	Jackson	United States	Mississippi Coliseum	Joe Cocker	—N/a	—N/a
June 17, 1990	Dallas	United States	Starplex Amphitheatre	Joe Cocker, B.B. King	14,960 / 20,000	$285,402
June 19, 1990	Pelham	United States	Oak Mountain Amphitheatre		—N/a	—N/a
June 20, 1990	Nashville	United States	Starwood Amphitheatre	Joe Cocker	—N/a	—N/a
June 22, 1990	Cuyahoga Falls	United States	Blossom Music Center	Joe Cocker	—N/a	—N/a
June 23, 1990	Clarkston	United States	Pine Knob Music Theatre	Joe Cocker	—N/a	—N/a
June 24, 1990	Cincinnati	United States	Riverbend Music Center		—N/a	—N/a
June 27, 1990	Noblesville	United States	Deer Creek Music Center	Joe Cocker	—N/a	—N/a
June 28, 1990	Burgettstown	United States	Coca-Cola Star Lake Amphitheatre		5,372 / 20,000	—N/a
June 30, 1990	Philadelphia	United States	Mann Music Center	Joe Cocker	—N/a	—N/a
July 1, 1990	Manchester	United States	Veterans Memorial Park		—N/a	—N/a
July 3, 1990	Essex Junction	United States	Champlain Valley Exposition	Joe Cocker	—N/a	—N/a
July 4, 1990	Bristol	United States	Lake Compounce Festival Park		—N/a	—N/a
July 5, 1990	Stanhope	United States	Waterloo Village	Joe Cocker	—N/a	—N/a
July 7, 1990	Holmdel Township	United States	Garden State Arts Center	Joe Cocker	—N/a	—N/a
July 8, 1990	Wantagh	United States	Jones Beach Marine Theater	Joe Cocker	—N/a	—N/a
July 10, 1990	Hamilton	Canada	Copps Coliseum		—N/a	—N/a
July 11, 1990	Montreal	Canada	Montreal Forum	Joe Cocker	—N/a	—N/a
July 13, 1990	Canandaigua	United States	Finger Lakes Center for the Performing Arts		—N/a	—N/a
July 14, 1990	Columbus	United States	Capital Music Center	Joe Cocker	—N/a	—N/a
July 15, 1990	St. Louis	United States	Fox Theatre		4,500 / 4,500	—N/a
July 16, 1990	Kansas City	United States	Starlight Theatre	Joe Cocker	—N/a	—N/a
July 17, 1990	Englewood	United States	Fiddler's Green Amphitheatre	Joe Cocker	—N/a	—N/a
July 20, 1990	Salem	United States	L.B. Day Amphitheatre	Joe Cocker	—N/a	—N/a
July 21, 1990	George	United States	Champs de Brionne Music Theatre		—N/a	—N/a
July 22, 1990	Vancouver	Canada	Pacific Coliseum	Joe Cocker	—N/a	—N/a
July 24, 1990	Anchorage	United States	Sullivan Arena	Joe Cocker	6,131 / 8,751	$144,079
July 25, 1990	Fairbanks	United States	Carlson Center	The Flyers	—N/a	—N/a
July 30, 1990	Saint Paul	United States	Harriet Island Regional Park	Dirty Dozen Brass Band	—N/a	—N/a
United States
August 24, 1990	Kalamazoo	United States	Kalamazoo County Fairgrounds Grandstand		—N/a	—N/a
August 25, 1990	East Troy	United States	Alpine Valley Music Theatre	Robert Cray Band, Janata	80,000 / 80,000	$2,026,630
August 26, 1990	East Troy	United States	Alpine Valley Music Theatre	Robert Cray Band, Janata	80,000 / 80,000	$2,026,630
Europe
~~September 7, 1990~~	Winterthur	Switzerland	Altstadt		—N/a	—N/a
~~September 9, 1990~~	London	England	Hammersmith Odeon	Colin James	—N/a	—N/a
~~September 10, 1990~~	London	England	Hammersmith Odeon	Colin James	—N/a	—N/a
~~September 13, 1990~~	Paris	France	Grand Rex		—N/a	—N/a
United States
~~September 23, 1990~~	Lubbock	United States	South Plains Fairgrounds		—N/a	—N/a
~~September 25, 1990~~	Santa Fe	United States	Paolo Soleri Amphitheater		—N/a	—N/a
~~September 28, 1990~~	Bakersfield	United States	Kern County Fair		—N/a	—N/a

== Sources ==
- Adams, Deanna R. (2002). Rock 'n' Roll and the Cleveland Connection. Kent State University Press. ISBN 9780873386913.
- Hopkins, Craig (2011). Stevie Ray Vaughan – Day by Day, Night After Night: His Final Years, 1983–1990. Backbeat Books. ISBN 978-1-61774-022-0.
- Patoski, Joe Nick; Crawford, Bill (1993). Stevie Ray Vaughan: Caught in the Crossfire. Little, Brown and Company. ISBN 978-0-31616-069-8.
- Pride and Joy (DVD). New York: Epic / Legacy. 2007.
