= Poplar Creek Music Theater =

Concert venue in Illinois, USA

Coordinates: 42°04′07.21″N 88°11′49.81″W

- Interactive map of Poplar Creek Music Theater
- Address: 60179 Higgins Road
- Location: Hoffman Estates, Illinois
- Owner: Nederlander Organization
- Capacity: 25,202
- Type: Amphitheatre

Construction
- Opened: June 6, 1980
- Closed: November 3, 1994
- Demolished: July, 1995

Poplar Creek Music Theater was a concert amphitheatre in Hoffman Estates, Illinois. It opened in 1980 and closed in 1994. It hosted a variety of popular musical acts during its 15-season existence. It consisted of a covered pavilion and grass seating area and had a capacity of 25,202 people: 7,202 reserved seats and 18,000 lawn seats.

Attendance began to dwindle in the late 1980s, and Poplar Creek faced competition from opening the World Music Theater (now Credit Union 1 Amphitheatre) in Tinley Park in 1990. Sears acquired the property in 1989 and allowed Poplar Creek to remain in operation until 1994, and demolition began in July 1995.

In 2006, the Sears Centre (as of 2020, the Now Arena) opened in Hoffman Estates, near the former location of Poplar Creek.

A new outdoor theatre next to the Sears Centre and about one mile from Poplar Creek's former location had been approved for construction. With approximately 10,000 seats, but it was never built.

== Events ==
List of events held at Poplar Creek
Artist	Event	Date	Opening Act(s)
10,000 Maniacs	Our Time in Eden Tour	June 11, 1993	World Party
.38 Special	Tour de Force Tour	July 14, 1984	Night Ranger
.38 Special	Strength in Numbers Tour	July 19, 1986	Honeymoon Suite
AC/DC	Who Made Who World Tour	September 4, 1986	Loudness
Aerosmith	Back in the Saddle Tour	July 12, 1984	Orion the Hunter
Aerosmith	Permanent Vacation Tour	July 17, 1988	Guns N' Roses
Air Supply	Now and Forever Tour	July 3, 1982	Livingston Taylor
Air Supply	1983 Tour	July 19, 1983	Tom Chapin
Air Supply	Hearts in Motion Tour	August 6, 1986	
Al Jarreau	Breakin' Away Tour	July 29, 1982	David Sanborn
Al Jarreau	Jarreau Tour	July 24, 1983	Melissa Manchester & David Brenner
Al Jarreau	Heart's Horizon Tour	August 11, 1989	Take 6
Alabama	40-Hour Week Tour	July 20, 1985	Bill Medley
Alabama	My Home's in Alabama Tour	July 22, 1990	Clint Black
The Allman Brothers Band	Reach for the Sky Tour	August 13, 1980	Henry Paul Band
The Allman Brothers Band	Brothers of the Road Tour	August 27, 1981	Gary U.S. Bonds
The Allman Brothers Band	20th Anniversary Tour	July 11, 1989	
The Allman Brothers Band	Shades of Two Worlds Tour	August 10, 1991	Little Feat & The Radiators
America	Alibi Tour	August 26, 1981	Christopher Cross
Amy Grant	Unguarded Tour	August 9, 1985	Russ Taff
Anderson Bruford Wakeman Howe	An Evening of Yes Music Plus Tour	August 20, 1989	
The Animals	Ark Reunion Tour	August 11, 1983	
Anne Murray	Somebody's Waiting Tour	August 15, 1980	Michael Johnson
Anne Murray	Where Do You Go When You Dream Tour	August 16, 1981	
Anne Murray	The Hottest Night of the Year Tour	September 3, 1982	
April Wine	Power Play Tour	July 20, 1982	
Asia	Asia Tour	June 17, 1982	
Asia	Alpha Tour	September 4, 1983	Chris de Burgh
The B-52's	Whammy! Tour	July 18, 1983	
Bad Company	Holy Water Tour	August 11, 1990	Damn Yankees
The Bangles	Everything Tour	August 18, 1989	
Barbara Mandrell	...In Black and White Tour	August 6, 1982	Do-Rites
Barbara Mandrell	Clean Cut Tour	September 22, 1984	
Barry Manilow	One Voice Tour	July 18, 1980	
Barry Manilow	One Voice Tour	July 19, 1980	
Barry Manilow	One Voice Tour	July 20, 1980	
Barry Manilow	One Voice Tour	July 21, 1980	
Barry Manilow	Here Comes the Night Tour	June 22, 1983	
Barry Manilow	Here Comes the Night Tour	June 23, 1983	
Barry Manilow	Here Comes the Night Tour	June 25, 1983	
Barry Manilow	Here Comes the Night Tour	June 26, 1983	
Barry Manilow	2:00 AM Paradise Cafe Tour	June 27, 1985	
Barry Manilow	2:00 AM Paradise Cafe Tour	June 28, 1985	
Barry Manilow	2:00 AM Paradise Cafe Tour	June 29, 1985	
Barry Manilow	Swing Street Tour	July 27, 1988	
Barry Manilow	Swing Street Tour	July 28, 1988	
Barry Manilow	1993 Tour	July 8, 1993	
Barry Manilow	1994 Tour	August 23, 1994	Roger Daltrey
Basia	The Sweetest Illusion Tour	September 2, 1994	Spyro Gyra
The Beach Boys	Keepin' the Summer Alive Tour	August 4, 1980	The Tremblers
The Beach Boys	Keepin' the Summer Alive Tour	August 5, 1980	The Tremblers
The Beach Boys	1981 Tour	June 20, 1981	Glenn Super
The Beach Boys	1982 Tour	June 12, 1982	
The Beach Boys	1983 Tour	June 5, 1983	Firefall
The Beach Boys	The Beach Boys Tour	August 4, 1985 (2 shows)	
The Beach Boys	1986 Tour	August 27, 1986	Roger McGuinn
The Beach Boys	1987 Tour	September 3, 1987	Marshall Crenshaw
The Beach Boys	1988 Tour	August 7, 1988	
The Beach Boys	Still Cruisin' Tour	June 10, 1989	Chicago
The Beach Boys	Still Cruisin' Tour	June 11, 1989	Chicago
The Beach Boys	1990 Tour	August 15, 1990	
The Beach Boys	1991 Tour	August 11, 1991	The Everly Brothers
The Beach Boys	Summer in Paradise Tour	August 7, 1992	David Cassidy
The Beach Boys	1993 Tour	September 4, 1993	America
The Beach Boys	1993 Tour	September 6, 1993	America
The Beach Boys	1994 Tour	August 12, 1994	America
Bee Gees	One World Tour	July 31, 1989	The Nylons
Bette Midler	De Tour	July 14, 1983	
Bette Midler	De Tour	July 15, 1983	
Bette Midler	De Tour	July 16, 1983	
Bette Midler	Experience the Divine Tour	September 3, 1993	
Bette Midler	Experience the Divine Tour	September 4, 1993	
Billy Idol	Rebel Yell Tour	June 1, 1984	
Black Sabbath	Mob Rules Tour	August 31, 1982	
Blondie	Tracks Across America Tour	August 8, 1982	
Blue Öyster Cult	Cultösaurus Erectus Tour	June 30, 1981	Humble Pie
Blue Öyster Cult	Fire of Unknown Origin Tour	August 15, 1982	Aldo Nova
Blue Öyster Cult	The Revölution by Night Tour	June 16, 1984	Billy Squier & Ratt
The Blues Brothers	1980 Tour	June 27, 1980	Journey
Blues Festival		September 2, 1993	
Blues Festival		August 31, 1994	
Bob Dylan	Shot of Love Tour	June 10, 1981	
Bob Dylan	True Confessions Tour	June 29, 1986	Tom Petty & The Heartbreakers
Bob Dylan	1988 Never Ending Tour	July 14, 1988	The Alarm
Bob Dylan	1989 Never Ending Tour	July 2, 1989	
Bob Seger & The Silver Bullet Band	Against the Wind Tour	August 18, 1980	
Bob Seger & The Silver Bullet Band	Against the Wind Tour	August 19, 1980	
Bob Seger & The Silver Bullet Band	The Distance Tour	July 9, 1983	Michael Bolton
Bob Seger & The Silver Bullet Band	The Distance Tour	July 10, 1983	Michael Bolton
Bob Seger & The Silver Bullet Band	Like a Rock Tour	August 15, 1986	The Fabulous Thunderbirds
Bob Seger & The Silver Bullet Band	Like a Rock Tour	August 16, 1986	The Fabulous Thunderbirds
Bobby Vinton	1986 Tour	July 26, 1986	
Bonnie Raitt	Luck of the Draw Tour	August 3, 1991	
Bonnie Raitt	Longing in Their Hearts Tour	August 25, 1994	Bruce Hornsby
Boz Scaggs	Other Roads Tour	September 9, 1988	
Brian Setzer	The Knife Feels Like Justice Tour	June 14, 1986	
Bruce Hornsby & The Range	Scenes From The Southside Tour	September 4, 1988	Melissa Etheridge
Bruce Hornsby & The Range	A Night on the Town Tour	August 25, 1990	Cowboy Junkies
Bruce Hornsby & The Range	1991 Tour	July 20, 1991	Rosanne Cash
Bryan Adams	Reckless Tour	June 13, 1985	Survivor
The Cars	Panorama Tour	August 31, 1980	
The Cars	Heartbeat City Tour	August 6, 1984	Wang Chung
Charlie Daniels Band	Windows Tour	June 13, 1982	
Charlie Daniels Band	1983 Tour	June 21, 1983	Outlaws
Cheap Trick	Standing on the Edge Tour	September 20, 1985	Simon F
Cher	Take Me Home Tour	July 13, 1981	
Cher	Take Me Home Tour	July 14, 1981	
Chet Atkins	The Sweet Corn Show	July 15, 1990	Garrison Keillor
Chicago	Chicago XIV Tour	August 26, 1980	
Chicago	Chicago XIV Tour	August 27, 1980	
Chicago	Chicago 16 Tour	June 18, 1982	
Chicago	1983 Tour	June 19, 1983	
Chicago	Chicago 17 Tour	August 1, 1984	
Chicago	Chicago 18 Tour	June 6, 1987	
Chicago	1990 Tour	July 14, 1990	
Chicago	1991 Tour	June 22, 1991	The Triplets
Chicago	Twenty 1 Tour	June 6, 1992	The Moody Blues
Chuck Mangione	Fun & Games Tour	July 28, 1980	
Chuck Mangione	Tarantella Tour	July 29, 1981	
Cinderella	Long Cold Winter Tour	July 26, 1989	Winger & BulletBoys
Cleo Laine	Smilin' Through Tour	June 23, 1981	James Galway
Crosby & Nash	1993 Tour	August 3, 1993	Shawn Colvin
Crosby, Stills & Nash	Daylight Again Tour	August 21, 1982	
Crosby, Stills & Nash	1987 Tour	August 15, 1987	The Fabulous Thunderbirds
Crosby, Stills & Nash	1988 Tour	August 24, 1988	
Crosby, Stills & Nash	Live It Up Tour	July 1, 1990	
Crosby, Stills & Nash	1992 Tour	August 26, 1992	
Crosby, Stills & Nash	After the Storm Tour	July 15, 1994	Fleetwood Mac
The Cure	The Beach Party Tour	July 15, 1986	
Cyndi Lauper	Fun Tour	September 16, 1984	
Dan Fogelberg	High Country Snows Tour	June 14, 1985	
Dan Fogelberg	Exiles Tour	July 14, 1987	
Depeche Mode	Black Celebration Tour	June 22, 1986	Book of Love
Depeche Mode	Music for the Masses Tour	May 20, 1988	Orchestral Manoeuvres in the Dark
Diana Ross	Diana Tour	July 30, 1980	
Diana Ross	Diana Tour	July 31, 1980	
Diana Ross	Workin' Overtime Tour	August 19, 1989	
Dinah Shore	1981 Tour	July 31, 1981	
Dinah Shore	1981 Tour	August 1, 1981	
Dio	The Last in Line Tour	August 8, 1984	Twisted Sister
Dio	Sacred Heart Tour	August 27, 1985	Rough Cutt
Dionne Warwick	No Night So Long Tour	July 25, 1981	
Dire Straits	Brothers in Arms Tour	August 3, 1985	
Dolly Parton	Heartbreak Express Tour	August 28, 1982	
Dolly Parton	White Limozeen Tour	June 25, 1989	Ricky Skaggs
Don Henley	1986 Tour	August 19, 1986	The Bangles & Mr. Mister
Don Henley	The End of the Innocence Tour	August 12, 1989	Edie Brickell & New Bohemians
Don Henley	1990 Tour	July 10, 1990	
Don Henley	1993 Tour	June 30, 1993	
Donna Summer	The Wanderer Tour	August 20, 1981	
Donna Summer	The Wanderer Tour	August 21, 1981	
Donna Summer	Hard for the Money Tour	July 12, 1983	
The Doobie Brothers	One Step Closer Tour	September 1, 1981	Carl Wilson
The Doobie Brothers	Brotherhood Tour	July 27, 1991	
The Doobie Brothers	1993 Tour	August 26, 1993	4 Wheel Drive
Duran Duran	Strange Behavior Tour	July 8, 1987	Erasure
Eddie Money	Nothing to Lose Tour	May 19, 1989	Henry Lee Summer
Eddie Rabbitt	Step by Step Tour	August 22, 1982	Lacy J. Dalton
Elton John	Jump Up Tour	July 10, 1982	Quarterflash
Elton John	Jump Up Tour	July 11, 1982	Quarterflash
Elton John	Ice on Fire Tour	August 23, 1986	
Elton John	Reg Strikes Back Tour	September 16, 1988	Wet Wet Wet
Elton John	Reg Strikes Back Tour	September 17, 1988	Wet Wet Wet
Elton John	Sleeping with the Past Tour	August 26, 1989	
Elton John	Sleeping with the Past Tour	August 27, 1989	
Elton John	The One Tour	September 11, 1992	
Elton John	The One Tour	September 12, 1992	
Elvis Costello & The Attractions	Punch the Clock Tour	August 24, 1983	Aztec Camera
Elvis Costello & The Attractions	Goodbye Cruel World Tour	August 28, 1984	Nick Lowe & His Cowboy Outfit
Elvis Costello & The Rude 5	Spike Tour	August 9, 1989	
Engelbert Humperdinck	Love's Only Love Tour	July 12, 1980	
Engelbert Humperdinck	Love's Only Love Tour	July 13, 1980	
Engelbert Humperdinck	Misty Blue Tour	July 16, 1982	
Engelbert Humperdinck	Misty Blue Tour	July 17, 1982	
Engelbert Humperdinck	You & Your Lover Tour	July 7, 1983	
Engelbert Humperdinck	You & Your Lover Tour	July 8, 1983	
Erasure	Wild! Tour	July 5, 1990	Louie Louie
Eric Clapton	Money and Cigarettes Tour	July 11, 1983	
Eric Clapton	Behind the Sun Tour	July 5, 1985	Graham Parker & The Shot
Eric Clapton	1992 Tour	August 24, 1992	Curtis Stigers
Eurythmics	Touch Tour	August 11, 1984	Howard Jones
Eurythmics	Revenge Tour	August 21, 1986	Jean Beauvoir
The Everly Brothers	EB 84 Reunion Tour	July 6, 1984	
Foghat	Tight Shoes Tour	August 14, 1981	The Danny Joe Brown Band
Foreigner	1993 Tour	August 8, 1993	
Foreigner	1994 Tour	August 17, 1994	The Doobie Brothers
Frank Sinatra	1990 Tour	September 1, 1990	Don Rickles
Frankie Valli & The 4 Seasons	1980 Tour	July 24, 1980	
George Benson	Give Me the Night Tour	August 21, 1980	
George Benson	1981 Tour	August 28, 1981	Randy Crawford
George Benson	1982 Tour	July 18, 1982	
George Benson	In Your Eyes Tour	August 27, 1983	
George Benson	I Got a Woman and Some Blues Tour	September 14, 1984	
George Benson	20/20 Tour	August 17, 1985	
Genesis	Three Sides Live Tour	August 2, 1982	
Genesis	Three Sides Live Tour	August 3, 1982	
The Go-Go's	Vacation Tour	September 8, 1982	
The Go-Go's	Talk Show Tour	June 24, 1984	INXS
Grateful Dead	1983 Tour	June 27, 1983	
Grateful Dead	1983 Tour	June 28, 1983	
The Greg Kihn Band	Kihntagious Tour	July 27, 1984	Little Steven & The Disciples of Soul
Hall & Oates	H2O Tour	June 11, 1983	
Hall & Oates	Ooh Yeah! Tour	August 19, 1988	
Hank Williams Jr.	Five-O Tour	June 19, 1985	
Hank Williams Jr.	Wild Streak Tour	August 27, 1988	Linda Ronstadt
Hank Williams Jr.	Wild Streak Tour	August 28, 1988	Linda Ronstadt
Hank Williams Jr.	1989 Tour	August 5, 1989	k.d. lang
Harry Chapin	1980 Tour	August 14, 1980	Arlo Guthrie
Heart	Private Audition Tour	August 23, 1982	John Mellencamp
Heart	Private Audition Tour	August 24, 1982	John Mellencamp
Heart	Bad Animals Tour	July 10, 1987	Tom Kimmel Band
Heart	1988 Tour	July 3, 1988	Michael Bolton
Heart	Brigade Tour	June 23, 1990	Giant
Herb Alpert & The Tijuana Brass	Bullish Tour	August 16, 1984	
Howard Jones	Cross That Line Tour	June 23, 1989	Midge Ure
Huey Lewis and the News	Sports Tour	July 7, 1984	
Huey Lewis and the News	1985 Tour	August 5, 1985	
Huey Lewis and the News	Small World Tour	August 14, 1988	
INXS	Kick Tour	June 18, 1988	Public Image Ltd
Iron Maiden	World Slavery Tour	June 16, 1985	Accept
Isaac Stern & The Boston Symphony Orchestra		July 27, 1980	
The J. Geils Band	Freeze Frame Tour	August 20, 1982	The Motels
Jackson Browne	Lawyers in Love Tour	August 28, 1983	
Jackson Browne	Lives in the Balance Tour	July 14, 1986	Peter Case
Jackson Browne	World in Motion Tour	July 5, 1989	El Rayo-X
Jackson Browne	I'm Alive Tour	August 10, 1994	John Hiatt
James Taylor	Flag Tour	August 17, 1980	
James Taylor	Dad Loves His Work Tour	June 13, 1981	
James Taylor	Dad Loves His Work Tour	June 14, 1981	
James Taylor	1982 Tour	August 9, 1982	Karla Bonoff
James Taylor	1982 Tour	August 10, 1982	Karla Bonoff
James Taylor	1983 Tour	August 4, 1983	
James Taylor	1984 Tour	August 3, 1984	Randy Newman
James Taylor	1984 Tour	August 4, 1984	Randy Newman
James Taylor	1990 Tour	September 23, 1990	
James Taylor	1994 Tour	July 17, 1994	
Janet Jackson	Janet World Tour	July 12, 1994	Tevin Campbell
Janet Jackson	Janet World Tour	July 13, 1994	Tevin Campbell
Jefferson Airplane	Jefferson Airplane Reunion Tour	September 9, 1989	
Jefferson Starship	Freedom at Point Zero Tour	June 19, 1980	
Jefferson Starship	Modern Times Tour	June 19, 1981	Dixie Dregs
Jefferson Starship	Winds of Change Tour	August 18, 1983	
Jefferson Starship	Nuclear Furniture Tour	August 26, 1984	
Jeffrey Osborne	Don't Stop Tour	July 17, 1985	
Jerry Garcia Band	1989 Tour	September 16, 1989	
Jethro Tull	The Broadsword and the Beast Tour	September 12, 1982	Saga
Jethro Tull	Crest of a Knave Tour	June 12, 1988	
Jimmy Buffett & The Coral Reefer Band	A Hot Dog & A Road Map Tour	July 5, 1980	Livingston Taylor
Jimmy Buffett & The Coral Reefer Band	Coconut Telegraph Tour	July 22, 1981	
Jimmy Buffett & The Coral Reefer Band	The Homecoming Tour	June 26, 1982	Bonnie Riatt
Jimmy Buffett & The Coral Reefer Band	An Evening in Margaritaville Tour	April 6, 1983	
Jimmy Buffett & The Coral Reefer Band	6-Stop American Tour	July 21, 1983	
Jimmy Buffett & The Coral Reefer Band	Feeding Frenzy Tour	June 23, 1984	
Jimmy Buffett & The Coral Reefer Band	Sleepless Knights Tour	June 23, 1985	
Jimmy Buffett & The Coral Reefer Band	Floridays Tour	July 6, 1986	
Jimmy Buffett & The Coral Reefer Band	A Pirate Looks At 40 Tour	July 3, 1987	
Jimmy Buffett & The Coral Reefer Band	Hot Water Tour	July 16, 1988	
Jimmy Buffett & The Coral Reefer Band	Off to See the Lizard Tour	July 1, 1989	The Neville Brothers
Jimmy Buffett & The Coral Reefer Band	Outposts Tour	July 5, 1991	Greg "Fingers" Taylor & The Ladyfingers Revue
Jimmy Buffett & The Coral Reefer Band	Outposts Tour	July 6, 1991	Greg "Fingers" Taylor & The Ladyfingers Revue
Jimmy Buffett & The Coral Reefer Band	Recession Recess Tour	August 14, 1992	Evangeline
Jimmy Buffett & The Coral Reefer Band	Recession Recess Tour	August 15, 1992	Evangeline
Jimmy Buffett & The Coral Reefer Band	Chameleon Caravan Tour	August 27, 1993	The Iguanas
Jimmy Buffett & The Coral Reefer Band	Chameleon Caravan Tour	August 28, 1993	The Iguanas
Jimmy Buffett & The Coral Reefer Band	Fruitcakes Tour	June 18, 1994	
Jimmy Buffett & The Coral Reefer Band	Fruitcakes Tour	June 19, 1994	
Joe Cocker	1991 Tour	July 18, 1991	
Joe Cocker	Night Calls Tour	August 16, 1992	
Joe Jackson	I'm the Man Tour	August 11, 1980	The Kings
Joe Jackson	Body and Soul Tour	June 15, 1984	Deluxury
Joe Jackson	1986 Tour	August 20, 1986	
Joe Walsh	There Goes the Neighborhood Tour	June 12, 1981	David Lindley
John Denver	Autograph Tour	June 6, 1980	
John Denver	Some Days Are Diamonds Tour	August 15, 1981	
John Denver	Seasons of the Heart Tour	July 22, 1983	
John Denver	Seasons of the Heart Tour	July 23, 1983	
John Denver	It's About Time Tour	June 5, 1984	
John Denver	It's About Time Tour	June 6, 1984	
John Denver	One World Tour	August 20, 1986	
John Denver	Earth Songs Tour	August 18, 1990	
John Denver	Different Directions Tour	July 9, 1992	
John Mellencamp	The Lonesome Jubilee Tour	June 10, 1988	
John Mellencamp	The Lonesome Jubilee Tour	June 11, 1988	
Johnny Cash	The Baron Tour	July 10, 1981	
Johnny Mathis	Different Kinda Different Tour	August 8, 1980	
Johnny Mathis	Different Kinda Different Tour	August 9, 1980	
Johnny Mathis	Friends in Love Tour	July 23, 1982	Henry Mancini
Johnny Mathis	Friends in Love Tour	July 24, 1982	Henry Mancini
Johnny Mathis	A Special Part of Me Tour	August 7, 1984	
Jonathon Brandmeier & The Leisure Suits	1988 Tour	June 25, 1988	
Joni Mitchell	Wild Things Run Fast Tour	July 6, 1983	
Journey	Escape Tour	September 3, 1981	Point Blank
Journey	Escape Tour	September 4, 1981	Point Blank
Judas Priest	Fuel for Life Tour	August 10, 1986	Dokken
The Judds	River of Time Tour	June 3, 1990	Highway 101 & McBride & the Ride
Judy Collins & The Elgin Symphony Orchestra	Sanity & Grace Tour	August 23, 1989	
Julian Lennon	The Secret Value of Daydreaming Tour	July 1, 1986	
Julie Andrews	1989 Tour	July 6, 1989	
Julio Iglesias	Non-Stop Tour	June 14, 1988	
Kansas	Audio-Visions Tour	August 9, 1981	Survivor
Kenny G	Silhouette Tour	May 28, 1989	
Kenny G	1990 Tour	August 10, 1990	Michael Bolton
Kenny Loggins	Keep the Fire Tour	July 11, 1980	Firefall
Kenny Loggins	High Adventure Tour	September 6, 1982	
Kenny Loggins	1983 Tour	August 25, 1983	
King Crimson	Beat Tour	August 7, 1982	
King Crimson	Three of a Perfect Pair Tour	June 22, 1984	The Elvis Brothers
The Kingston Trio	1981 Tour	July 3, 1981	The Association
The Kinks	Think Visual Tour	June 14, 1987	Joan Jett & The Blackhearts
The Kinks	UK Jive Tour	September 23, 1989	
Kool & the Gang	In the Heart Tour	July 21, 1984	KC and the Sunshine Band
Kool & the Gang	Emergency Tour	July 27, 1985	
Kool & the Gang	1987 Tour	July 11, 1987	
Kool & the Gang	1988 Tour	July 1, 1988	
Lawrence Welk	1980 Tour	June 15, 1980	
Lee Greenwood	Streamline Tour	August 16, 1985	Gary Morris
Lena Horne	The Lady and Her Music Tour	July 30, 1982	
Lena Horne	The Lady and Her Music Tour	July 31, 1982	
Lena Horne	The Lady and Her Music Tour	August 1, 1982	
Loverboy	1983 Tour	August 3, 1983	
Loverboy	Lovin' Every Minute of It Tour	August 11, 1985	
Loverboy	1986 Tour	August 24, 1986	Dokken
Loverboy	Wildside Tour	July 6, 1988	
Linda Ronstadt	Mad Love Tour	July 26, 1981	Joe Ely
Linda Ronstadt	Mad Love Tour	July 27, 1981	Joe Ely
Linda Ronstadt	What's New Tour	July 3, 1984	Nelson Riddle Orchestra
Linda Ronstadt	Cry Like a Rainstorm, Howl Like the Wind Tour	August 22, 1990	The Neville Brothers
Little Feat	Let It Roll Tour	August 4, 1989	Melissa Etheridge
Little Feat	Representing the Mambo Tour	August 4, 1990	John Hiatt
Little Feat	Shake Me Up Tour	August 19, 1992	John Hiatt
Little Feat	1993 Tour	June 13, 1993	The Tragically Hip
Liza Minnelli	1980 Tour	June 20, 1980	Marvin Hamlisch
Liza Minnelli	1981 Tour	August 29, 1981	Joel Grey
Liza Minnelli	1981 Tour	August 30, 1981	Joel Grey
Liza Minnelli	1985 Tour	July 12, 1985	
Liza Minnelli	1985 Tour	July 13, 1985	
Liza Minnelli	1994 Tour	August 21, 1994	
Luciano Pavarotti	1984 Tour	August 13, 1984	
Lynyrd Skynyrd	The Last Rebel Tour	September 1, 1992	
Lynyrd Skynyrd	Endangered Species Tour	August 4, 1994	Ted Nugent
Mac Davis	Texas in My Rearview Mirror Tour	July 16, 1981	Alabama
The Manhattan Transfer	Mecca for Moderns Tour	September 2, 1982	
The Manhattan Transfer	Bop Doo-Wopp Tour	July 28, 1985	
The Manhattan Transfer	Vocalese Tour	July 27, 1986	
The Marshall Tucker Band	Dedicated Tour	July 15, 1981	
The Marshall Tucker Band	Tuckerized Tour	August 11, 1982	
Melissa Manchester	Mathematics Tour	July 9, 1985	
Melissa Manchester	1990 Tour	August 12, 1990	
Men at Work	Cargo Tour	August 29, 1983	INXS
Merle Haggard & The Strangers	That's the Way Love Goes Tour	August 17, 1983	
Metallica	Damaged Justice Tour	July 7, 1989	The Cult
Michael Bolton	Time, Love & Tenderness Tour	September 14, 1991	Oleta Adams
Midnight Oil	Blue Sky Mining Tour	June 8, 1990	
Mike + The Mechanics	Living Years Tour	August 13, 1989	The Outfield
Molly Hatchet	No Guts...No Glory Tour	June 4, 1983	Scandal & JB and The Leisure Suits
The Monkees	20th Anniversary Tour	August 7, 1986	Herman's Hermits, The Grass Roots & Gary Puckett & The Union Gap
The Monkees	Here We Come Again Tour	July 12, 1987	"Weird Al" Yankovic
The Moody Blues	Long Distance Voyager Tour	July 17, 1981	
The Moody Blues	Long Distance Voyager Tour	July 18, 1981	
The Moody Blues	Long Distance Voyager Tour	July 19, 1981	
The Moody Blues	Summer Nights Tour	July 2, 1984	
The Moody Blues	The Other Side of Life Tour	July 5, 1986	The Fixx
The Moody Blues	1987 Tour	July 1, 1987	
The Moody Blues	Sur la Mer Tour	August 15, 1988	Glass Tiger
The Moody Blues	MCMXC Tour	August 1, 1990	Jimmy Ryser Band
The Moody Blues	Keys of the Kingdom Tour	August 9, 1991	
The Moody Blues	1992 Tour	June 5, 1992	Chicago
The Moody Blues	1993 Tour	June 25, 1993	
The Moody Blues	1994 Tour	June 8, 1994	
Morrissey	Your Arsenal Tour	September 13, 1992	
Neil Diamond	Primitive Tour	August 23, 1984	
Neil Diamond	Headed for the Future Tour	July 8, 1986	
Neil Young & The Shocking Pinks	Everybody's Rockin' Tour	September 15, 1983	
Neil Young & The International Harvesters	1984 Tour	September 3, 1984	
Neil Young & Crazy Horse	Life Tour	August 18, 1987	
Neil Young & The Bluenotes	This Note's for You Tour	August 16, 1988	Tracy Chapman
Neil Young	1989 Tour	August 28, 1989	
New Edition	New Edition Tour	June 30, 1985	
New Kids on the Block	Hangin' Tough Tour	July 23, 1989	Tiffany & Tommy Page
New Order	Brotherhood Tour	August 16, 1987	Echo & the Bunnymen
New Order	Monsters of Alternative Rock Tour	June 30, 1989	Public Image Ltd & The Sugarcubes
New York Philharmonic		June 23, 1980	
Night of the Guitar Concert		June 13, 1989	
Night Ranger	Big Life Tour	July 18, 1987	The Outfield
The Oak Ridge Boys	American Made Tour	August 21, 1983	
The Oak Ridge Boys	Deliver Tour	August 10, 1984	
The Oak Ridge Boys	Step On Out Tour	August 10, 1985	
Olivia Newton-John	Physical Tour	August 29, 1982	Tom Scott
Olivia Newton-John	Physical Tour	August 30, 1982	Tom Scott
Olivia Newton-John	1991 Tour	August 13, 1991	
The Osmonds	The Osmond Brothers Tour	July 17, 1983	
Ozzy Osbourne	Blizzard of Ozz Tour	August 22, 1981	Def Leppard
Ozzy Osbourne	The Ultimate Sin Tour	July 13, 1986	Metallica
Ozzy Osbourne	No Rest for the Wicked Tour	July 15, 1989	White Lion & Vixen
Pat Benatar	Precious Time Tour	August 24, 1981	
Pat Benatar	Wide Awake in Dreamland Tour	September 1, 1988	
Pat Metheny Group	First Circle Tour	July 19, 1985	
Paul Anka	Headlines Tour	August 1, 1980	
Paul Anka	Headlines Tour	August 2, 1980	
Paul Anka	Both Sides of Love Tour	June 4, 1981	
Paul Anka	1982 Tour	June 6, 1982	
Paul Anka	Walk a Fine Line Tour	July 20, 1983	
Paul Simon	Solo Acoustic Tour	August 18, 1984	
Paul Simon	Graceland (album) Tour	June 28, 1987	with Hugh Masekela, Ladysmith Black Mambazo and Miriam Makeba
Paula Abdul	Spellbound Tour	August 12, 1992	
Pete Seeger	1981 Tour	July 19, 1981	Arlo Guthrie
Peter, Paul and Mary	1981 Reunion Tour	August 5, 1981	
Peter Allen	1989 Tour	July 21, 1989	Bernadette Peters
Peter Frampton	Breaking All the Rules Tour	August 6, 1981	
Peter Gabriel	Security Tour	August 2, 1983	The Call
Peter Gabriel	So World Tour	July 24, 1987	Youssou N'Dour
Phil Collins	The No Jacket Required World Tour	June 18, 1985	
The Pointer Sisters	Break Out Tour	July 5, 1984	Lee Ritenour
Poison	Native Tongue Tour	May 30, 1993	Damn Yankees
The Pretenders	Learning to Crawl Tour	August 17, 1984	Simple Minds
The Psychedelic Furs	Mirror Moves Tour	July 25, 1984	Talk Talk
Public Enemy	Fear of a Black Planet Tour	July 12, 1991	The Sisters of Mercy
PUSH for Excellence Benefit Concert		June 28, 1987	
Queen	Hot Space Tour	August 13, 1982	Billy Squier
Queen	Hot Space Tour	August 14, 1982	Billy Squier
Randy Travis	Old 8×10 Tour	July 9, 1989	K. T. Oslin
Ratt	Dancing Undercover Tour	June 30, 1987	Poison
Ratt	Reach for the Sky Tour	June 2, 1989	Great White & Warrant
Ratt	Detonator Tour	August 16, 1991	L.A. Guns & Bang Tango
Reba McEntire	The Last One to Know Tour	August 24, 1987	
Reba McEntire	Read My Mind Tour	August 27, 1994	John Michael Montgomery
Reggae Sunsplash		June 30, 1994	
REO Speedwagon	Hi Infidelity Tour	August 24, 1980	
REO Speedwagon	Hi Infidelity Tour	August 25, 1980	
REO Speedwagon	Good Trouble Tour	September 10, 1982	Survivor
REO Speedwagon	Good Trouble Tour	September 11, 1982	Survivor
REO Speedwagon	Wheels Are Turnin' Tour	July 14, 1985	Cheap Trick
Rick Astley	Hold Me in Your Arms Tour	September 14, 1989	Martika
Rick Springfield	Success Hasn't Spoiled Me Yet Tour	August 26, 1982	The Greg Kihn Band
Rick Springfield	Hard to Hold Tour	August 31, 1984	Corey Hart
Rick Springfield	Tao Tour	July 29, 1985	'Til Tuesday
Rickie Lee Jones	Flying Cowboys Tour	June 26, 1990	Lyle Lovett
Ringo Starr & His All-Starr Band	1989 Tour	July 25, 1989	
Ringo Starr & His All-Starr Band	1992 Tour	June 13, 1992	
Robert Plant	Now and Zen Tour	May 29, 1988	The Mission
Rod Stewart	Camouflage Tour	July 28, 1984	
Rod Stewart	Camouflage Tour	July 29, 1984	
Rod Stewart	Vagabond Heart Tour	September 19, 1991	
Rod Stewart	Vagabond Heart Tour	September 20, 1991	
Rod Stewart	A Night to Remember Tour	August 13, 1993	Patty Smyth
Rod Stewart	A Night to Remember Tour	August 14, 1993	Patty Smyth
Roger Waters & The Bleeding Heart Band	Radio K.A.O.S. Tour	September 9, 1987	
Sammy Hagar	Danger Zone Tour	June 25, 1980	The Joe Perry Project
Santana	Santana US Tour 1980	August 12, 1980	
Santana	Zebop! Tour	June 7, 1981	
Santana	Shangó Tour	July 9, 1982	
Santana	Havana Moon Tour	September 10, 1983	
Santana	Beyond Appearances Tour	May 31, 1985	Buddy Guy
Santana	Beyond Appearances Tour	July 25, 1986	
Santana	Freedom Tour	June 27, 1987	Buddy Guy
Santana	Viva Santana! Tour	September 18, 1988	
Santana	Milagro Tour	August 1, 1992	Phish
Sarah Vaughan	An Evening of Pops	June 7, 1980	Henry Mancini
Sha Na Na	Rockin' in the 80's Tour	August 10, 1980	John Sebastian
Sha Na Na	Silly Songs Tour	August 18, 1981	
Sheena Easton	Best Kept Secret Tour	August 21, 1984	
Sheena Easton	The Lover in Me Tour	July 8, 1989	
Shirley Bassey	All by Myself Tour	June 18, 1983	
Smokey Robinson	Love, Smokey Tour	August 28, 1990	
Southside Johnny & The Asbury Jukes	Love Is a Sacrifice Tour	July 8, 1980	Big Twist & The Mellow Fellows
Squeeze	Cosi Fan Tutti Frutti Tour	September 6, 1985	
Squeeze	Babylon and On Tour	July 8, 1988	
Starship	Knee Deep in the Hoopla Tour	August 1, 1986	The Outfield
Steely Dan	1993 Reunion Tour	August 15, 1993	
Steely Dan	1994 Tour	August 26, 1994	
Steve & Eydie	1984 Tour	August 9, 1984	
Steve Miller Band	Abracadabra Tour	July 22, 1982	
Steve Miller Band	1989 Tour	July 16, 1989	
Steve Miller Band	Wide River Tour	June 6, 1993	Paul Rodgers
Steve Miller Band	1994 Tour	June 26, 1994	
Steve Winwood	Back in the High Life Tour	August 26, 1986	Jimmy Cliff
Steve Winwood	Roll With It Tour	July 9, 1988	
Stevie Nicks	Rock a Little Tour	June 21, 1986	Peter Frampton
Stevie Nicks	The Other Side of the Mirror Tour	September 15, 1989	The Hooters
Stevie Nicks	Whole Lotta Trouble (Timespace) Tour	August 8, 1991	Billy Falcon
Stevie Nicks	Street Angel Tour	August 14, 1994	
Stevie Ray Vaughan & Double Trouble	Soul to Soul Tour	June 20, 1986	
Stevie Ray Vaughan & Double Trouble	Live Alive Tour	June 19, 1987	The Fabulous Thunderbirds
Stevie Ray Vaughan & Double Trouble	Live Alive Tour	September 2, 1988	The Fabulous Thunderbirds
Stevie Ray Vaughan & Double Trouble	In Step Tour	July 29, 1989	Stray Cats
Sting	The Dream of the Blue Turtles Tour	September 7, 1985	
Sting	...Nothing Like the Sun Tour	August 11, 1988	
The Style Council	Internationalists Tour	July 26, 1985	
Supertramp	Free as a Bird Tour	September 7, 1987	
Talking Heads	1982 Tour	August 16, 1982	
Talking Heads	Speaking in Tongues Tour	August 14, 1983	
Tangerine Dream	Optical Race Tour	August 25, 1988	Andy Summers
Ted Nugent	Penetrator Tour	June 13, 1984	Alcatrazz
The Temptations & The O'Jays	1990 Tour	July 13, 1990	Four Tops
Thompson Twins	Close to the Bone Tour	July 15, 1987	Chris Isaak
Three Dog Night	1981 Reunion Tour	August 12, 1981	
Tina Turner	Break Every Rule World Tour	September 11, 1987	Level 42
Tina Turner	Break Every Rule World Tour	September 12, 1987	Level 42
Tina Turner	What's Love? Tour	June 27, 1993	Lindsey Buckingham
Tom Jones	Do You Take This Man Tour	August 22, 1980	
Tom Jones	Do You Take This Man Tour	August 23, 1980	
Tom Jones	Don't Let Our Dreams Die Young Tour	July 29, 1983	
Tom Jones	Don't Let Our Dreams Die Young Tour	July 30, 1983	
Tom Petty and the Heartbreakers	Damn the Torpedoes Tour	June 18, 1980	Tommy Tutone
Tom Petty and the Heartbreakers	Southern Accents Tour	June 22, 1985	'Til Tuesday
Tom Petty and the Heartbreakers	Let Me Up (I've Had Enough) Tour	June 20, 1987	The Georgia Satellites & The Del Fuegos
Tom Petty and the Heartbreakers	Full Moon Fever Tour	August 10, 1989	The Replacements
Tom Petty and the Heartbreakers	Into the Great Wide Open Tour	September 6, 1991	Chris Whitley
Toto	Toto IV Tour	August 19, 1982	Michael Stanley Band
Tracy Chapman	Matters of the Heart Tour	June 3, 1992	
UB40	Geffery Morgan Tour	July 31, 1985	Midnight Oil
UB40	Rat in the Kitchen Tour	August 29, 1986	Fine Young Cannibals
UB40	UB40 Tour	August 20, 1988	The Jets
UB40	Promises and Lies Tour	August 16, 1993	Gin Blossoms
Utopia	Adventures in Utopia Tour	July 26, 1980	Ambrosia (band)
Utopia	Camouflage Tour	July 11, 1981	
Utopia	Utopia Tour	August 10, 1983	
Utopia	Oblivion Tour	August 15, 1984	
VH1 Classic SuperFest		July 25, 1987	
Victor Borge	1981 Tour	July 12, 1981	
Warsaw Philharmonic Orchestra		July 27, 1982	
Waylon Jennings	Music Man Tour	August 29, 1980	
Waylon Jennings	1981 Tour	June 27, 1981	
Waylon Jennings	It's Only Rock & Roll Tour	June 8, 1983	
Wayne Newton	1981 Tour	July 24, 1981	
Wayne Newton	1982 Tour	July 25, 1982	
Weather Report	1981 Tour	June 28, 1981	
Wham!	Make It Big Tour	August 23, 1985	
Wham!	Make It Big Tour	August 25, 1985	
Whitesnake	Whitesnake Tour	July 13, 1988	Great White
Whitesnake	Slip of the Tongue Tour	June 24, 1990	Faster Pussycat
Whitney Houston	The Greatest Love World Tour	August 30, 1986	Kenny G (select venues)
Whitney Houston	The Greatest Love World Tour	August 31, 1986	Kenny G (select venues)
Whitney Houston	Moment of Truth World Tour	July 21, 1987	Kenny G
Whitney Houston	Moment of Truth World Tour	July 22, 1987	Kenny G
Willie Nelson & Family	Family Bible Tour	August 20, 1980	
Willie Nelson & Family	Somewhere Over the Rainbow Tour	August 7, 1981	
Willie Nelson & Family	Somewhere Over the Rainbow Tour	August 8, 1981	
Willie Nelson & Family	Always on My Mind Tour	September 4, 1982	
Willie Nelson & Family	Always on My Mind Tour	September 5, 1982	
Willie Nelson & Family	Tougher Than Leather Tour	August 12, 1983	
Willie Nelson & Family	City of New Orleans Tour	August 20, 1984	
Willie Nelson & Family	1992 Tour	July 13, 1992	
Wilson Phillips	Shadows and Light Tour	August 23, 1992	
Yes	90125 Tour	August 12, 1984	
Yes	Big Generator Tour	September 2, 1988	
ZZ Top	Eliminator Tour	September 9, 1983	
ZZ Top	Afterburner World Tour	June 26, 1986	
