= Live Alive Tour =

1986–88 concert tour by Stevie Ray Vaughan and Double Trouble

- World tour by Stevie Ray Vaughan and Double Trouble
- Promotional poster for the tour
- Location: North America, Europe
- Associated album: Live Alive
- Start date: November 22, 1986
- End date: December 31, 1988
- Legs: 8 in North America; 1 in Europe; 9 total
- No. of shows: 185 in North America; 22 in Europe; 207 total

Stevie Ray Vaughan and Double Trouble concert chronology
- Soul to Soul Tour (1985–86); Live Alive Tour (1986–88); In Step Tour (1989–90)

The Live Alive Tour was a concert tour through North America and Europe, undertaken by Stevie Ray Vaughan and Double Trouble from 1986 to 1988. At the start of the tour, Vaughan and bassist Tommy Shannon had both achieved sobriety. Their success with overcoming long-term drug and alcohol addiction had been attained by entering a rehabilitation facility, where they stayed for four weeks. Although Vaughan was nervous about performing while sober, he received encouragement from his bandmates. Throughout the tour during performances, Vaughan would warn his audiences about the dangers of substance abuse.

Consisting of nine legs and 207 shows, the tour began in Towson, Maryland on November 22, 1986 and ended in New York City on December 31, 1988. The first five legs alternated with visits between the United States and Canada, before the sixth leg took the band to Europe. The final leg incorporated stops in the northeast, midwest and west coast, before the group's return to the northeast in December 1988.

Although Vaughan and Double Trouble did not follow a set list, all thirteen songs from Live Alive were performed at least once during the tour, and as many as eleven of them were included in each of the band's performances. The tour was generally well-received and provoked many positive reactions from music critics, most of whom took note of Vaughan's sobriety—in 1988, Rhys Williams of The Daily Tar Heel noted that "his enthusiasm seemed to reflect his cleaned-up image". He would continue this lifestyle in the following years, before his death in a helicopter accident in 1990.

== Background ==
Stevie Ray Vaughan is widely regarded as one of the most influential electric guitarists in the history of blues music, and one of the most important musicians in the revival of blues in the 1980s. Allmusic describes him as "a rocking powerhouse of a guitarist who gave blues a burst of momentum in the '80s, with influence still felt long after his tragic death." Despite a mainstream career that spanned only seven years, Vaughan eventually became recognized among musicians as the future standard for success and promise in blues. Biographer Craig Hopkins explains that Vaughan's talent was the result of the youth culture in the 1960s: "the popularity of playing instruments as a form of teen entertainment, the prevalence of teen dances, the success of his older brother, the practicality of playing guitar as an outlet for a shy boy and the singular, intense focus on the guitar all contributed to create one of the best electric guitar players of all time."

Born and raised in Dallas, Texas, Vaughan began playing guitar at the age of seven, inspired by his older brother Jimmie Vaughan. He was an apt pupil, no less quick to learn than his brother, and was playing the guitar with striking virtuosity by the time he was fourteen. In 1971, he dropped out of high school and moved to Austin the following year. Soon afterward, he began playing gigs on the nightclub circuit, earning a spot in Marc Benno's band, the Nightcrawlers, and later with Denny Freeman in the Cobras, with whom he continued to work through late 1977. He then formed his own group, Double Trouble, before performing at the Montreux Jazz Festival in mid-July 1982 and being discovered by John Hammond, who in turn interested Epic Records with signing them to a recording contract. Within a year, they achieved international fame after the release of their debut album Texas Flood, and in 1984 their second album, Couldn't Stand the Weather, along with the supporting tour, brought them to further commercial and critical success; the album quickly outpaced the sales of Texas Flood.

After the addition of keyboardist Reese Wynans in 1985, the band released Soul to Soul and toured in support of the album, which was their first as a quartet. However, Vaughan's drug and alcohol habits continued to escalate. In September 1986, the band traveled to Denmark to begin a European leg of the Soul to Soul Tour. By this time, Vaughan had reached the peak of his substance abuse. He would consume a quart (0.95 L) of whiskey and an ounce (28 g) of cocaine each day. According to biographer Craig Hopkins, his lifestyle of substance abuse was "probably better characterized as the bottom of a deep chasm."

During the late night hours of September 28, Vaughan became ill after a performance in Germany. He was taken by an ambulance to a nearby hospital, where he received medical treatment for near-death dehydration as a result of his long-term drug and alcohol addictions. He then checked into the London Clinic under the care of Dr. Victor Bloom, who warned Vaughan that if his destructive lifestyle continued, he would be dead within a month. Resuming the tour, the band reached Zürich on September 29. Vaughan was ill, but gave a concert with Double Trouble in the town, which took place at Volkshaus, and was well enough to perform at the Hammersmith Palais, in London, on October 2. After staying in London for more than a week, Vaughan returned to the United States and began a substance abuse treatment program at a rehabilitation facility in Atlanta, Georgia; bassist Tommy Shannon followed suit by checking into rehab in Austin, Texas.

== Touring personnel ==
Band:

- Stevie Ray Vaughan (Guitars, Vocals)
- Chris Layton (Drums)
- Tommy Shannon (Bass)
- Reese Wynans (Keyboards)

Management/Tour Staff:

- Paul "Skip" Rickert (Tour Manager)
- Mark Rutledge (Production Manager)
- Bill Mounsey (Stage Manager)
- René Martinez (Guitar Technician)
- Steve Bond (Technician)
- Mark Miller (Lighting Technician)
- John Bernard (Lighting Technician)
- Bob Weibel (Sound Technician)
- Randy Weitzel (Sound Technician)
- Alex Hodges/Strike Force (Talent Management)

== Planning, itinerary, and ticketing ==
Stevie Ray Vaughan and Double Trouble's initial planning for the Live Alive tour emerged after Vaughan and Shannon completed their treatment programs in November 1986. The band hired Skip Rickert, a replacement tour manager who eliminated the wild backstage antics of their past concert tours by revising the stipulations of their hospitality rider. Shannon later commented: "Before we got clean and sober, backstage you'd see all the coke dealers and everybody drunk and high and all these women running around. It went from that to us not having any alcohol backstage and none of those people came backstage anymore...We cleaned up our business." Adamant about improvements in time management and itinerary planning, Vaughan had requested a reduction in touring time, which generally allowed no more than one show per day. As rehearsals began for the tour on November 19, 1986, Vaughan began to grow feelings of self-doubt and nervousness about performing while sober. However, he received encouragement from his bandmates. Wynans later recalled: "Stevie was real worried about playing after he'd gotten sober...he didn't know if he had anything left to offer. Once we got back out on the road, he was very inspired and motivated."

Unlike the group's previous tour, which began three months before the release of Soul to Soul, the Live Alive Tour started five days after Live Alive was released. The tour's beginning, on November 22, 1986, took place at the Towson Center in Towson, Maryland. Shannon later recalled the opening show: "I remember my first gig sober with Stevie and I was terrified, and I looked out there and saw those people...I was thinking God, boy I need a drink – but I went ahead and went out there and went through it." For the opening leg, 22 concerts at auditoriums and indoor arenas were scheduled from November 1986 through January 1987. Tickets for the shows in New York, Atlanta and Sunrise, Florida were sold out.

The second leg of the tour consisted of 25 arena and auditorium shows in the US from January to March 1987. Over a thousand free tickets for an intimate show in Boston were given away through a local radio station, while nearly 20,000 tickets were sold for the concert in Honolulu, Hawaii. Three additional North American legs were planned: the third leg from May–July 1987, the fourth leg from August–December 1987, and the fifth leg from March–May 1988. Following a month-long series of performances as the opening act for Robert Plant in May, which included six sold-out shows in Canada and the northeastern US, the band was booked for a European leg that began in the Netherlands on June 19, 1988. While the band had toured Europe every year between 1983 and 1986, they had been absent from the region's tour circuit for almost two years. These would be Vaughan's last concert appearances in Europe. The final leg in the US took place from August–December 1988.

== Show overview ==
=== Main set ===
Although Vaughan and Double Trouble did not follow a fixed set list, the band played all thirteen songs from Live Alive at least once during the tour, and as many as eleven of them were included in each of their performances. Shannon later recalled, "He wouldn't tell us what the first song was going to be, and we never even thought about it. We'd just get up there and start playing." Lighting technician Trey Hensley commented on Vaughan's spontaneity and instinctual performances: "...It was never the same show...Stevie didn't believe in following a set list. He would follow where he felt the crowd was. They'd give me a set list, and by song three or four, we'd go left. You never knew what he was going to play until he started the song, which is very challenging for a lighting technician." Hensley continued, "A lot of artists take long breaks between songs. Figure in ninety minutes you'd get thirteen songs, and a lot of us did eleven. They'd let the crowd clap, but Stevie wouldn't. He'd do a song and boom – right into the next song. He didn't wait for the applause to die down. He gave them as many songs as he could in that time frame. You've got to respect a guy for that. I mean, it's tempting to just hold your arms up and take the applause."

The concert usually began with a medley arrangement of two instrumentals, "Scuttle Buttin'" and "Say What!". Vaughan and Double Trouble would then perform mostly older material from Soul to Soul, Couldn't Stand the Weather and Texas Flood, before newer songs were played. During the set, the band frequently included their arrangement of Stevie Wonder's "Superstition". According to Vaughan, their idea to cover the song had been inspired when they began jamming the song during a rehearsal for the Live Alive recordings. "Willie the Wimp" was also performed, which was written by Ruth Ellsworth and Bill Carter after reading a newspaper article about a mobster from Chicago who was buried in a Cadillac-style coffin. Carter, who opened for the band during the fifth leg of the tour in April 1988, collaborated with Double Trouble during an extended break in the fourth leg of the tour, and wrote the song "Crossfire" (the song was ultimately included on Vaughan and Double Trouble's next LP In Step, released in 1989, and became their only number-one hit single). Commencing with the latter portion of the fourth leg, early performances of the song were included in the main set.

Vaughan and Double Trouble often finished their set with "Life Without You" while Vaughan routinely paused in the middle of the song to warn the audience about the dangers of substance abuse. Although Vaughan admitted that speaking to the audience in this fashion made him nervous, he realized the difference between encouragement and preaching. Guitar World′s Bill Milkowski wrote, "...He warns his young audiences about getting caught up in bad habits and making the kinds of mistakes with their lives that he made...he uses "Life Without You" as a moving, musical backdrop to his current crusade against the evils of drugs and alcohol. The fervor of his rap gives Stevie Ray the aura of an evangelist preacher working the crowd. And this is no hollow pitch; he means every word he says, from the bottom of his heart." Vaughan's monologues continued to be an inspiration for fans that struggled with drug and alcohol addictions.

=== Encore ===
Hensley recalled that the excitement of concertgoers grew when the encores started: "He was one of those artists where, as an example, after we finished the first of maybe three encores, we'd go black on stage and I'd give 'em a good three or four minutes to wipe down and get a drink or whatever. All I had to do was barely ghost the lights on stage, and people would go nuts! They would start screaming and beating the bleachers or the seating. That's all it took, and they knew he was coming back." Once the encores began, Vaughan and Double Trouble often performed original material such as "Love Struck Baby", "Rude Mood", and "Pride and Joy". They also performed covers including The Isley Brothers' "Testify", Larry Davis' "Texas Flood", Jimmy Reid's "Tin Pan Alley", Lonnie Mack's "Wham!", Albert Collins' "Collins' Shuffle" and "Don't Lose Your Cool"; Guitar Slim's "Letter to My Girlfriend", Jimi Hendrix's "Voodoo Child (Slight Return)" and "Third Stone from the Sun"; and Earl King's "Come On".

=== Guest appearances ===
On November 29, 1986, the horn section from Roomful of Blues appeared on-stage in Providence, Rhode Island to perform the encores with the band, which Vaughan and Double Trouble had frequently done for past tours up to that point. Other guest performers on the tour included Colin James, Otis Rush and Vaughan's brother Jimmie Vaughan.

Throughout the tour during performances, Vaughan re-confirmed his blues influences on him and Double Trouble. At the show on April 20, 1988 at Sunrise Musical Theatre, Rush performed the encores with the band. Milkowski wrote that by the time they started playing "Stormy Monday", the audience gave him a well-received response: "Some will no doubt head to their local record stores the next day and peruse the blues bins looking for Otis Rush albums. And for that, Stevie Ray Vaughan deserves credit." For the "Jazz Fest" show on April 22, 1988 in New Orleans, Vaughan invited B.B. King and Albert Collins on-stage for an impromptu jam session of "Texas Flood". Collins performed "Frosty" with the group; he and Vaughan dueted using their contrasting guitar playing styles.

== Impact and legacy ==
=== Future endeavors ===
As the tour progressed, Vaughan was longing to work on material for his next LP, but in January 1987, he filed for a divorce from his wife Lenny due to the demise of their relationship, which restricted him of starting any projects until the proceedings were finalized. This prevented him from writing and recording new songs for almost two years. Vaughan commented, "It became more and more apparent that even though we'd separated for a couple of years, if I wrote anything, she wanted at least half of it, minimum. So I quit writing. And when I started to try again it was like I'd write part of a line or one line and go blank." After their divorce became final, Vaughan and Double Trouble began performing new songs during the final leg of the tour, and began rehearsing for their next studio project in October 1988.

The tour's two-year length, then Vaughan and Double Trouble's longest, concluded in December 1988. They then recorded the album In Step, from January to March 1989 at Kiva Studios in Memphis, Tennessee. While Vaughan became self-assured with performing while sober, he initially had doubts about his musical and creative abilities in a recording environment. However, Shannon later recalled that he gained confidence as the sessions progressed: "In Step was, for him, a big growing experience. In my opinion, it's our best studio album, and I think he felt that way, too." Wynans asserted that In Step deviated from the band's earlier recordings: "It was more original material and groove oriented. I like the blues that we put on there, but the other songs were actually songs and not 12-bar blues." Released on June 13, 1989, In Step ultimately became the group's most commercially successful release, selling over half a million copies in the US by early 1990, and was their first to win a Grammy Award. It peaked at number 33 on the Billboard 200, where it spent 47 weeks on the chart. The album was the band's fourth and final studio work before Vaughan's death in a helicopter accident in August 1990.

== Tour dates ==
List of concerts, showing date, city, country, venue/event, and opening act(s)
| Date | City | Country | Venue/Event | Opening Act(s) |
Leg 1: United States
| November 22, 1986 | Towson | United States | Towson Center | The Outlaws |
| November 23, 1986 | Boston | United States | Orpheum Theatre | The Outlaws |
| November 24, 1986 | Boston | United States | Orpheum Theatre | The Outlaws |
| November 26, 1986 | New York City | United States | Radio City Music Hall | The Outlaws |
| November 28, 1986 | Passaic | United States | Capitol Theatre | Broken Homes |
| November 29, 1986 | Providence | United States | Providence Performing Arts Center | Broken Homes |
| November 30, 1986 | Troy | United States | Houston Field House | Broken Homes |
| December 2, 1986 | Poughkeepsie | United States | Mid-Hudson Civic Center | The Outlaws |
| December 3, 1986 | Pittsburgh | United States | Syria Mosque | The Outlaws |
| December 5, 1986 | Toledo | United States | Toledo Sports Arena | The Outlaws |
| December 6, 1986 | Grand Rapids | United States | Welsh Auditorium | The Outlaws |
| December 7, 1986 | Columbus | United States | Veterans Memorial Auditorium | The Outlaws |
| December 9, 1986 | Saginaw | United States | Saginaw Civic Center | The Outlaws |
| December 11, 1986 | Ann Arbor | United States | Hill Auditorium | The Outlaws |
| December 12, 1986 | Merrillville | United States | Holiday Star Theatre | The Outlaws |
| December 13, 1986 | Peoria | United States | Peoria Civic Center Exhibit Hall | The Outlaws |
| December 14, 1986 | Muncie | United States | Emens Auditorium | The Outlaws |
| December 29, 1986 | Cincinnati | United States | Taft Theatre | Lonnie Mack |
| December 30, 1986 | Nashville | United States | Grand Ole Opry House | Gregg Allman Band |
| December 31, 1986 | Atlanta | United States | Fox Theatre | Lonnie Mack |
| January 2, 1987 | Tampa | United States | Curtis Hixon Hall | Gregg Allman Band |
| January 3, 1987 | Sunrise | United States | Sunrise Musical Theatre | The Outlaws |
Leg 2: United States
| January 30, 1987 | Dallas | United States | Fair Park Coliseum | Omar & the Howlers |
| January 31, 1987 | Houston | United States | Sam Houston Coliseum | Omar & the Howlers |
| February 1, 1987 | San Antonio | United States | Majestic Theatre | Omar & the Howlers |
| February 3, 1987 | Austin | United States | Austin City Coliseum | Omar & the Howlers |
| February 4, 1987 | McAllen | United States | Villa Real Convention Center | Omar & the Howlers |
| February 6, 1987 | Lafayette | United States | Grant Street Dancehall | Marcia Ball |
| February 7, 1987 | Birmingham | United States | Alabama Theatre | Omar & the Howlers |
| February 8, 1987 | Pensacola | United States | Pensacola Saenger Theatre | Omar & the Howlers |
| February 10, 1987 | Charlotte | United States | Charlotte Park Center | Lonnie Mack |
| February 11, 1987 | Raleigh | United States | Dorton Arena | Lonnie Mack |
| February 13, 1987 | Johnson City | United States | Freedom Hall Civic Center | Lonnie Mack |
| February 14, 1987 | Knoxville | United States | Alumni Memorial Gym | Lonnie Mack |
| February 15, 1987 | Louisville | United States | Louisville Gardens | Lonnie Mack |
| February 17, 1987 | Spartanburg | United States | Spartanburg Memorial Auditorium | Lonnie Mack |
| February 19, 1987 | Charleston | United States | Charleston Municipal Auditorium | Lonnie Mack |
| February 20, 1987 | Fairfax | United States | Patriot Center | Lonnie Mack |
| February 21, 1987 | Brookville | United States | Tilles Center | Lonnie Mack |
| February 22, 1987 | Portland | United States | Portland City Hall Auditorium | Lonnie Mack |
| February 24, 1987 | Boston | United States | The Metro | |
| February 26, 1987 | New Orleans | United States | Riverboat President | The Fabulous Thunderbirds Mason Ruffner |
| February 28, 1987 | Big Spring | United States | Federal Correctional Institution | The Fabulous Thunderbirds |
| February 28, 1987 | Midland | United States | Country Villa Convention Center | The Fabulous Thunderbirds |
| March 19, 1987 | South Padre Island | United States | Isla Blanca Park | The Fabulous Thunderbirds |
| March 21, 1987 | Honolulu | United States | Aloha Stadium | Henry Kapono Band |
| March 25, 1987 | Dayton Beach | United States | Ocean Center | Gregg Allman Band |
Leg 3: United States
| May 5, 1987 | Madison | United States | Oscar Mayer Theater | Jerry Goodman |
| May 7, 1987 | Urbana | United States | Foellinger Auditorium | Otis and the Elevators |
| May 8, 1987 | Des Moines | United States | Des Moines Civic Center | Rick Medlocke and Blackfoot |
| May 9, 1987 | Cedar Rapids | United States | Paramount Theatre | Rick Medlocke and Blackfoot |
| May 10, 1987 | La Porte | United States | La Porte Civic Auditorium | Rick Medlocke and Blackfoot |
| May 12, 1987 | Little Rock | United States | Robinson Center Music Hall | Omar & the Howlers |
| May 14, 1987 | Memphis | United States | Mud Island Amphitheatre | Omar & the Howlers |
| May 15, 1987 | Tulsa | United States | River Parks Amphitheater | Omar & the Howlers |
| May 16, 1987 | Amarillo | United States | Tri-State Fairgrounds Coliseum | Omar & the Howlers |
| May 17, 1987 | El Paso | United States | El Paso County Coliseum | KRAKT |
| May 19, 1987 | Santa Fe | United States | Paolo Soleri Amphitheater | Omar & the Howlers |
| May 21, 1987 | Phoenix | United States | Celebrity Theatre | Gregg Allman Band |
| May 22, 1987 | Phoenix | United States | Celebrity Theatre | Gregg Allman Band |
| May 23, 1987 | Santa Barbara | United States | Santa Barbara Bowl | Tom Ball & Kenny Sultan |
| May 24, 1987 | Concord | United States | Concord Pavilion | Mitch Woods |
| May 27, 1987 | Los Angeles | United States | Wiltern Theatre | Lou Ann Barton |
| May 28, 1987 | Los Angeles | United States | Wiltern Theatre | Lou Ann Barton |
| May 29, 1987 | Los Angeles | United States | Wiltern Theatre | Lou Ann Barton |
| May 30, 1987 | Los Angeles | United States | Wiltern Theatre | Lou Ann Barton |
| May 31, 1987 | Monterey | United States | Laguna Seca Raceway | Bonnie Hayes & the Wild Combo |
Leg 4: North America
| June 5, 1987 | Columbia | United States | Merriweather Post Pavilion | Gregg Allman Band |
| June 6, 1987 | Cuyahoga Falls | United States | Blossom Music Center | Herbie Hancock The Crusaders |
| June 7, 1987 | Grand Rapids | United States | Welsh Auditorium | Gregg Allman Band |
| June 9, 1987 | Bloomington | United States | Met Center | Gregg Allman Band |
| June 10, 1987 | Green Bay | United States | City Center Theatre | Gregg Allman Band |
| June 12, 1987 | Clarkston | United States | Pine Knob Music Theatre | Gregg Allman Band |
| June 13, 1987 | Clarkston | United States | Pine Knob Music Theatre | Gregg Allman Band |
| June 14, 1987 | Fort Wayne | United States | Fort Wayne Memorial Coliseum | Gregg Allman Band |
| June 16, 1987 | Omaha | United States | Omaha Music Hall | Gregg Allman Band |
| June 17, 1987 | Morrison | United States | Red Rocks Amphitheatre | Gregg Allman Band |
| June 19, 1987 | Hoffamn Estates | United States | Poplar Creek Music Theatre | Gregg Allman Band |
| June 20, 1987 | Indianapolis | United States | Indianapolis Sports Center | Gregg Allman Band |
| June 21, 1987 | Urbana | United States | Champaign County Music Park | Gregg Allman Band Henry Lee Summer |
| June 23, 1987 | Cincinnati | United States | Riverbend Music Center | Gregg Allman Band |
| June 25, 1987 | Norwich | United States | Chelsea Parade Historic District | Young Neal and the Vipers |
| June 27, 1987 | Saratoga Springs | United States | Saratoga Performing Arts Center | McCoy Tyner Trio Clifford Jordan and the Vernel Fournier Trio |
| June 28, 1987 | Canandaigua | United States | Finger Lakes Performing Arts Center | Stan Getz Charlie Watts Orchestra |
| June 29, 1987 | New York City | United States | Pier 84 | Gregg Allman Band |
| June 30, 1987 | Philadelphia | United States | Mann Music Center | Gregg Allman Band |
| July 1, 1987 | Mansfield | United States | Great Woods Center for the Performing Arts | Gregg Allman Band |
| July 22, 1987 | Montreal | Canada | La Ronde | |
| July 23, 1987 | Toronto | Canada | Kingswood Music Theatre | Omar & the Howlers |
Leg 5: United States
| August 6, 1987 | Austin | United States | Auditorium Shores | Will and the Kill |
| August 8, 1987 | Dallas | United States | Park Central Amphitheater | Omar & the Howlers |
| August 9, 1987 | New Orleans | United States | Hibernia Bank Pavilion | Gregg Allman Band Dash Rip Rock |
| August 12, 1987 | West Allis | United States | Wisconsin State Fair Park | Gregg Allman Band |
| August 13, 1987 | Columbus | United States | Ohio State Fair | Gregg Allman Band |
| August 15, 1987 | New York City | United States | Pier 84 | Gregg Allman Band |
| August 16, 1987 | Old Orchard Beach | United States | The Ball Park | Gregg Allman Band |
| August 18, 1987 | Allentown | United States | Allentown Fairgrounds | Gregg Allman Band |
| August 20, 1987 | Springfield | United States | Illinois State Fairgrounds Grandstand | Gregg Allman Band John Anderson |
| August 21, 1987 | Louisville | United States | Freedom Hall | The Fabulous Thunderbirds Gregg Allman Band |
| August 23, 1987 | St. Louis | United States | Fox Theatre | Gregg Allman Band |
| August 25, 1987 | Joplin | United States | Joplin Memorial Hall | Gregg Allman Band |
| August 28, 1987 | Pueblo | United States | Colorado State Fair | Gregg Allman Band |
| August 29, 1987 | Kansas City | United States | Starlight Theatre | Gregg Allman Band |
| August 30, 1987 | Des Moines | United States | Iowa State Fairgrounds Grandstand | Gregg Allman Band |
| September 2, 1987 | San Bernardino | United States | Orange Pavilion | Charlie Daniels Band Gregg Allman Band |
| September 3, 1987 | Fresno | United States | Warnors Theatre | Gregg Allman Band |
| September 4, 1987 | Lancaster | United States | Antelope Valley Fairgrounds Grandstand | Gregg Allman Band |
| September 5, 1987 | San Diego | United States | SDSU Open Air Theatre | The Beat Farmers |
| September 6, 1987 | Nashville | United States | Starwood Amphitheatre | Grinderswitch David Lynn Jones |
| September 11, 1987 | Albuquerque | United States | Tingley Coliseum | Marshall Crenshaw |
| September 12, 1987 | Oklahoma City | United States | Zoo Amphitheatre | Blue Tuesday |
| November 5, 1987 | Phoenix | United States | Arizona Veterans Memorial Coliseum | |
| November 7, 1987 | Cocoa | United States | Brevard County Fairgrounds Grandstand | |
| November 8, 1987 | Tampa | United States | USF Sun Dome | Backtrack Blues Band |
| November 20, 1987 | San Antonio | United States | Majestic Theatre | Chris Holzhaus |
| November 21, 1987 | Corpus Christi | United States | Bayfront Plaza Auditorium | Chris Holzhaus |
| December 2, 1987 | Austin | United States | Austin Opera House | Bill Carter and the Blame |
Leg 6: United States
| December 27, 1987 | Sacramento | United States | Community Center Theater | The Paladins |
| December 28, 1987 | Reno | United States | Lawlor Events Center | The Paladins Voodoo Cats |
| December 29, 1987 | Redding | United States | Redding Civic Auditorium | The Paladins |
| December 31, 1987 | Oakland | United States | Kaiser Convention Center | Tower of Power Jr. Walker & the All-Stars |
Leg 7: North America
| March 3, 1988 | St. Louis | United States | Fox Theatre | The Fabulous Thunderbirds |
| March 4, 1988 | Merrillville | United States | Holiday Star Theatre | The Fabulous Thunderbirds |
| March 5, 1988 | Merrillville | United States | Holiday Star Theatre | The Fabulous Thunderbirds |
| March 6, 1988 | Akron | United States | James A. Rhodes Arena | The Fabulous Thunderbirds |
| April 2, 1988 | St. John's | Canada | Memorial Stadium | The Razorbacks |
| April 4, 1988 | Sydney | Canada | Centre 200 | The Razorbacks |
| April 5, 1988 | Halifax | Canada | Halifax Metro Centre | The Razorbacks |
| April 6, 1988 | Fredericton | Canada | Aitken Centre | The Razorbacks |
| April 8, 1988 | Orono | United States | Memorial Gymnasium | The Blue Flames |
| April 9, 1988 | Lowell | United States | Lowell Memorial Auditorium | Bill Carter |
| April 10, 1988 | Springfield | United States | Paramount Theater | Bill Carter |
| April 11, 1988 | Providence | United States | Providence Performing Arts Center | Bill Carter |
| April 13, 1988 | Upper Darby Township | United States | Tower Theater | Bill Carter |
| April 14, 1988 | Bethlehem | United States | Stabler Arena | Bill Carter Henry Lee Summer |
| April 15, 1988 | Richmond | United States | Carpenter Center | Bill Carter |
| April 17, 1988 | Chapel Hill | United States | UNC Memorial Hall | Bill Carter |
| April 19, 1988 | Orlando | United States | Bob Carr Performing Arts Centre | |
| April 20, 1988 | Sunrise | United States | Sunrise Musical Theatre | Otis Rush |
| April 22, 1988 | New Orleans | United States | Riverboat President | John P. Hammond |
| April 28, 1988 | Boston | United States | Matthews Arena | John Cafferty and the Beaver Brown Band |
| April 29, 1988 | Hamilton | United States | Starr Rink | Denny Dent |
| April 30, 1988 | Medford | United States | President's Lawn | Treat Her Right |
| May 1, 1988 | Storrs | United States | Memorial Stadium | Force MDs The Smithereens |
| May 5, 1988 | Quebec City | Canada | Colisée de Québec | Opening act for: Robert Plant |
| May 7, 1988 | Montreal | Canada | Montreal Forum | Opening act for: Robert Plant |
| May 8, 1988 | Ottawa | Canada | Ottawa Civic Centre | Opening act for: Robert Plant |
| May 10, 1988 | Toronto | Canada | Maple Leaf Gardens | Opening act for: Robert Plant |
| May 11, 1988 | Rochester | United States | Rochester War Memorial | Opening act for: Robert Plant |
| May 13, 1988 | Emmitsburg | United States | Knott Arena | Little Junior and the Hit Men |
| May 15, 1988 | Hartford | United States | Hartford Civic Center | Opening act for: Robert Plant |
| May 17, 1988 | East Rutherford | United States | Brendan Byrne Arena | Opening act for: Robert Plant |
| May 18, 1988 | East Rutherford | United States | Brendan Byrne Arena | Opening act for: Robert Plant |
| May 20, 1988 | Mansfield | United States | Great Woods Center for the Performing Arts | Opening act for: Robert Plant |
| May 23, 1988 | Philadelphia | United States | Philadelphia Spectrum | Opening act for: Robert Plant |
| May 25, 1988 | Cuyahoga Falls | United States | Blossom Music Center | Opening act for: Robert Plant |
| May 26, 1988 | Kalamazoo | United States | Wings Stadium | Opening act for: Robert Plant |
| May 27, 1988 | Davenport | United States | LeClaire Park Bandshell | Gregg Allman Band John Kay & Steppenwolf |
Leg 8: Europe
| June 19, 1988 | Rotterdam | Netherlands | Rotterdam Ahoy | Hothouse Flowers |
| June 21, 1988 | Newcastle | England | Newcastle City Hall | Brendan Croker |
| June 22, 1988 | Manchester | England | Manchester Apollo | Brendan Croker |
| June 23, 1988 | London | England | Hammersmith Odeon | Brendan Croker |
| June 24, 1988 | London | England | Hammersmith Odeon | Brendan Croker |
| June 25, 1988 | St. Gallen | Switzerland | Sittertobel | Ladysmith Black Mambazo, Stephan Eicher |
| June 28, 1988 | Stockholm | Sweden | Gröna Lund | |
| June 29, 1988 | Oslo | Norway | Chateau Neuf | |
| July 1, 1988 | Ringe | Denmark | Midtfyns Festival | Ziggy Marley and the Melody Makers Love Construction |
| July 2, 1988 | Hamburg | West Germany | Hamburg Stadtpark | Hothouse Flowers |
| July 3, 1988 | Pistoia | Italy | Piazza del Duomo | Otis Rush Fabio Treves |
| July 4, 1988 | Paris | France | Palais des Sports | |
| July 6, 1988 | Lignano | Italy | Arena Alpe Adria | Fabio Treves, Dave Kelly |
| July 7, 1988 | Milan | Italy | Palatrussardi | The Pogues |
| July 8, 1988 | Salerno | Italy | Stadio Donato Vestuti | |
| July 10, 1988 | Stuttgart | West Germany | Theaterhaus Stuttgart | Hothouse Flowers |
| July 11, 1988 | Fürth | West Germany | Stadthalle Fürth | Hothouse Flowers |
| July 13, 1988 | Mannheim | West Germany | Music Circus | Hothouse Flowers |
| July 14, 1988 | Bonn | West Germany | Biskuithalle | Hothouse Flowers |
| July 15, 1988 | Neunkirchen | West Germany | TUS-Halle | Hothouse Flowers |
| July 16, 1988 | Peer | Belgium | Deusterstraat | Joe Louis Walker and the Bosstalkers Tom Principato Band |
| July 17, 1988 | Oulu | Finland | Kuusisaari | Dave's 12 Bar, Popeda |
Leg 9: United States
| August 16, 1988 | Bristol | United States | Lake Compounce Festival Park | Roomful of Blues |
| August 18, 1988 | Columbia | United States | Merriweather Post Pavilion | The Fabulous Thunderbirds |
| August 19, 1988 | New York City | United States | Pier 84 | Joe Satriani |
| August 20, 1988 | New York City | United States | Pier 84 | Joe Satriani |
| August 24, 1988 | Darien | United States | Darien Lake Amphitheatre | The Fabulous Thunderbirds |
| August 25, 1988 | Cleveland | United States | Nautica Stage | The Fabulous Thunderbirds |
| August 26, 1988 | Clarkston | United States | Pine Knob Music Theatre | The Fabulous Thunderbirds |
| August 27, 1988 | Danville | United States | David S. Palmer Arena | Big Twist and the Mellow Fellows |
| August 28, 1988 | Atlanta | United States | Chastain Park Amphitheatre | The Fabulous Thunderbirds |
| August 30, 1988 | Du Quoin | United States | Du Quoin State Fairgrounds | The Fabulous Thunderbirds |
| September 1, 1988 | Cincinnati | United States | Riverbend Music Center | The Fabulous Thunderbirds |
| September 2, 1988 | Hoffman Estates | United States | Poplar Creek Music Theatre | The Fabulous Thunderbirds |
| September 3, 1988 | Madison | United States | Dane County Expo Center | The Fabulous Thunderbirds |
| September 5, 1988 | Morrison | United States | Red Rocks Amphitheatre | The Fabulous Thunderbirds |
| September 30, 1988 | San Diego | United States | SeaWorld San Diego | The Fabulous Thunderbirds |
| October 2, 1988 | Costa Mesa | United States | Pacific Amphitheatre | The Fabulous Thunderbirds |
| October 4, 1988 | Santa Cruz | United States | Santa Cruz Civic Auditorium | |
| October 5, 1988 | Los Angeles | United States | Greek Theatre | The Fabulous Thunderbirds |
| October 6, 1988 | Los Angeles | United States | Greek Theatre | The Fabulous Thunderbirds |
| October 8, 1988 | Santa Barbara | United States | Santa Barbara Bowl | Omar & the Howlers |
| October 9, 1988 | Concord | United States | Concord Pavilion | Omar & the Howlers |
| December 29, 1988 | Asbury Park | United States | The Stone Pony | |
| December 31, 1988 | New York City | United States | The Ritz | Duke Robillard and the Pleasure Kings |
