= Paul "Skip" Rickert =

Film producer, songwriter, tour manager

- Born: Paul Rickert; Birch Valley, Pennsylvania
- Occupations: Songwriter; music tour manager; film producer
- Known for: Santana, Stevie Ray Vaughan, Backstreet Boys

Paul "Skip" Rickert is an American songwriter, film producer, and a music tour manager and director. He co-wrote, 99 Ways to Die, recorded by Megadeth which charted at #23 on Billboard's Mainstream Rock Airplay chart in 1993. He was nominated for a Latin Grammy Award in 2014 for producing the music documentary, Santana: Corazón - Live from Mexico, Live It to Believe It.

He also is the long-time music tour manager and director for Carlos Santana and Santana and former music tour manager of Stevie Ray Vaughan and the Backstreet Boys, among others. He has worked with the Barbra Streisand, and Guns N'Roses, among others.

== Career ==
Paul "Skip" Rickert grew up in the Birch Valley section of Levittown, Pennsylvania and graduated in 1972 from Pennsbury High School in Fairless Hills. He attended Bucks County Community College and while attending UCSD as a theatre major, he was a theater technician at the Colorado Shakespeare Festival and worked with the Colorado Council on the Arts and Humanities. His first gig in 1977 was as a stage carpenter for the Rolling Stones in Boulder, Colorado. After graduating in 1979, he became the tour manager for the Little River Band and was the production manager on their album, Playing to Win.

Rickert is the music tour manager and director of Santana and has worked with ZZ Top, Korn, Barbra Streisand, Diana Ross, Guns N'Roses, Green Day, Ozzy Osbourne, Ice Cube, Eric Idle, Natalie Cole, Enrique Iglesias, Midnight Oil, Sex Pistols and Paris Hilton. He was also the production manager for "Kenny Loggins on Broadway".

He managed the Backstreet Boys' Black & Blue Tour and Into the Millennium Tour as well as producing their documentary, Around the World, which was certified Platinum in 2001.

Rickert has managed Santana's concerts and music tours since 2005, including 12 overseas tours and a two-year residency at the Joint at the Hard Rock Hotel & Casino in Las Vegas. He was a manager on their Guitar Heaven: The Greatest Guitar Classics of All Time album and in 2012, was named the head of "Touring" for Santana's newly formed company, Cristalino, Inc.

He was nominated for a Latin Grammy Award in 2014 for producing the music documentary, Santana: Corazón - Live from Mexico, Live It to Believe It and was a producer on Santana IV: Live at the House of Blues, Las Vegas' live album in 2016.

Rickert began managing Stevie Ray Vaughan's music tours in 1986 on Vaughan's world, Live Alive Tour as well as managing his The Fire Meets the Fury Tour (1989) featuring Jeff Beck. In 1990, while Rickert was managing his In Step Tour (1989 - 1990), Vaughan died in a helicopter crash after a concert.

Rickert co-wrote, "99 Ways to Die", recorded by Megadeth which charted at #23 on Billboard's Mainstream Rock Airplay chart in 1993. The single was featured on Beavis and Butt-Head as well as on the Soundtrack, The Beavis and Butt-Head Experience, which charted at #5 on the US Billboard 200 and was certified Platinum.

He has given talks on "The Business of the Live Music Business" and "Live Sound" at CSUSM and NAMM.
