= 1991 Vallejo helicopter crash =

1991 aviation incident in California, United States

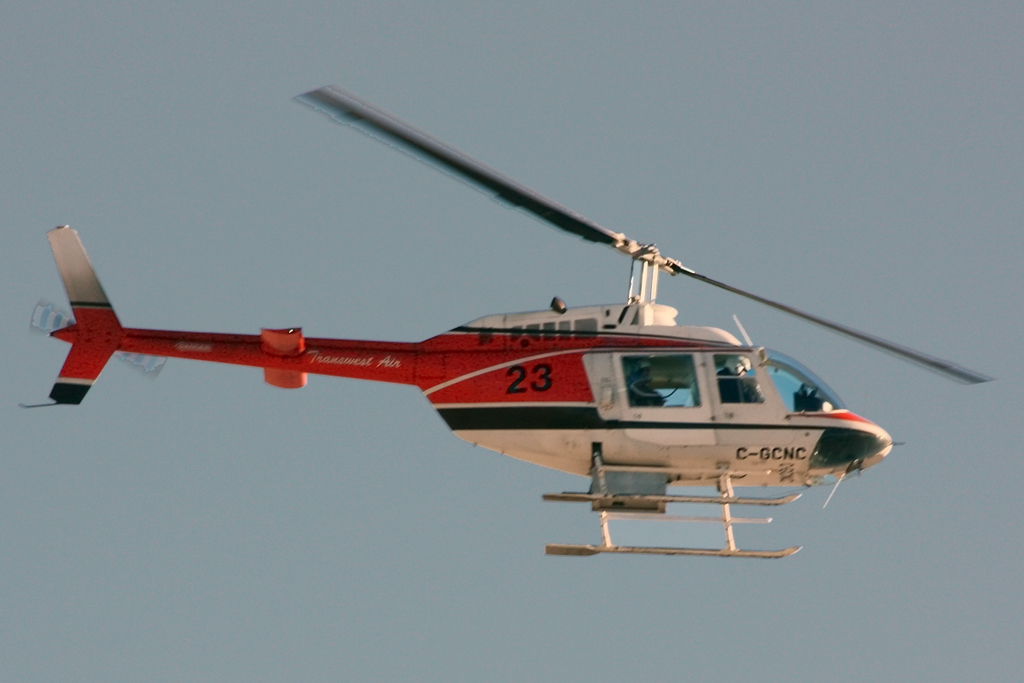
- Bell 206B Jetranger similar to accident aircraft

Accident
- Date: October 25, 1991
- Summary: Continued flight into known adverse weather
- Site: Approximately six miles west of Vallejo, California, United States; 38°09′11″N 122°24′45″W

Aircraft
- Aircraft type: Bell 206B
- Operator: Corporate Mobility Inc.
- Registration: N3456M
- Passengers: 2
- Crew: 1
- Fatalities: 3
- Survivors: 0

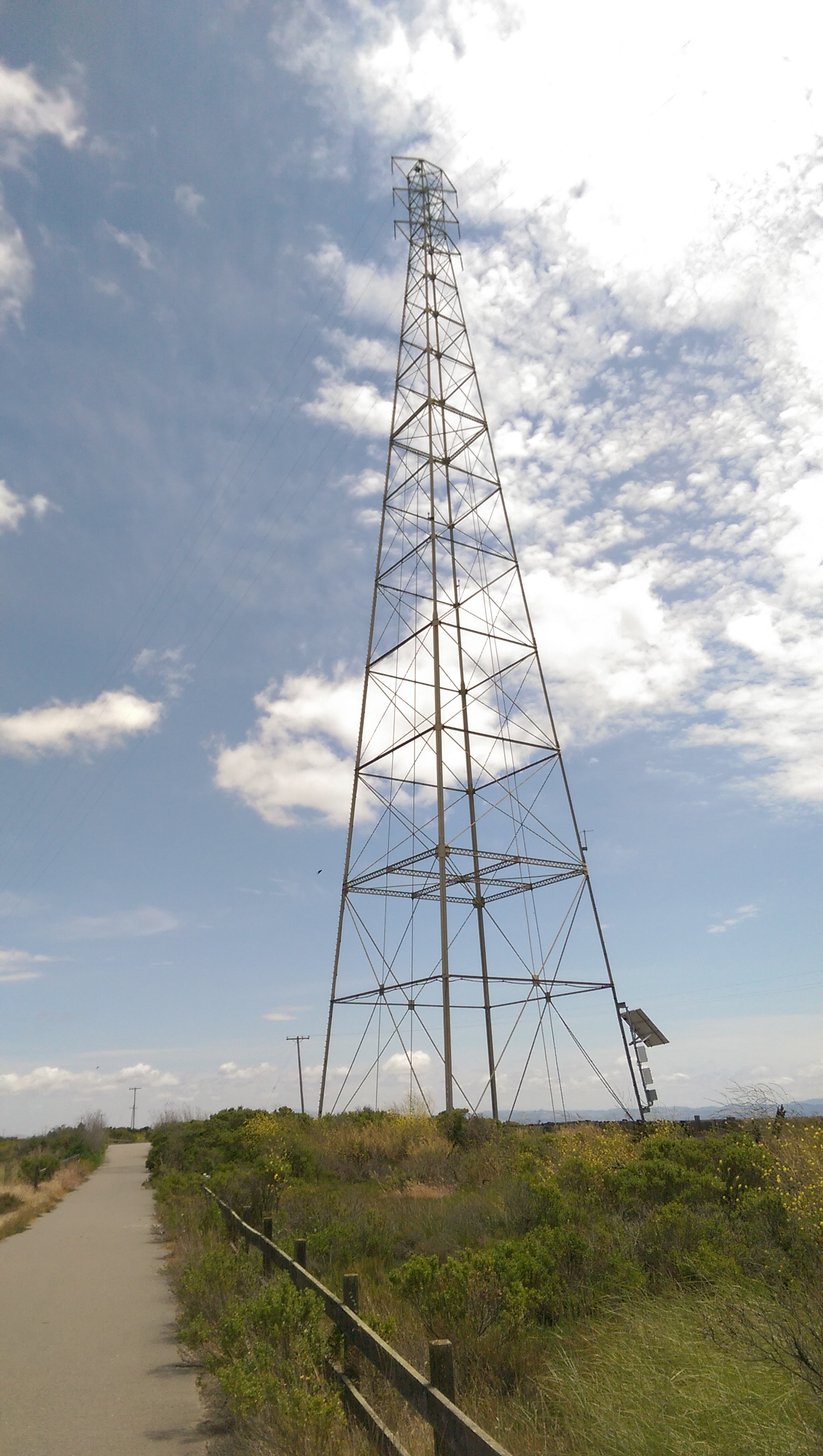
The rebuilt high-tension, high-voltage tower as it appeared in May 2015

On October 25, 1991, a Bell 206 carrying rock music concert promoter Bill Graham, his girlfriend Melissa Gold, and pilot Steve Kahn crashed into a transmission tower west of Vallejo, California, killing everyone on board. The cause of the accident was determined to be the pilot's intentional flight into known adverse weather conditions.

== Accident ==
The Bell 206B JetRanger was operating under Federal Aviation Regulation Part 91, and departed from parking lot "F" of the Concord Pavilion around 9:45 pm, bound for the Commodore Center Heliport (KJMC) in Sausalito, California, about 27 miles (43 km) to the west-southwest. The pilot had received a weather briefing in which visual flight rules (VFR) flight was not recommended due to inclement weather. Before take-off, the pilot requested and received a special VFR clearance to pass through the airspace of Buchanan Field Airport in Concord, California, on a northwest heading. When the helicopter lifted off, the weather was 0.5-mile (0.8 km) visibility, gusty winds, heavy rain, and overcast with a 200-foot (60 m) ceiling. Using pilotage to navigate from one landmark to another at an altitude just below the cloud base, the pilot proceeded through the city of Vallejo and began following California State Route 37. At 9:56 pm near the northernmost point of San Pablo Bay, the Bell 206B struck the top of a 223 ft (68 m) high-voltage transmission tower, located roughly 150 ft (50 m) south of CA 37, and became impaled on it. The aircraft exploded on impact and all three occupants suffered fatal injuries.

== Aircraft and crew ==
The Bell 206B JetRanger registration number N3456M and serial number 1391, had an airframe total time of 6,279 hours and its last inspection was on September 9, 1991, seven logged hours before the accident.

The pilot was 42-year-old Steve Kahn, who held valid airline transport, flight instructor, and commercial certificates, with 4,541 total flight hours logged.

== Aftermath ==
The helicopter became welded to the tower and a large crane was required to remove and lower it to the ground. The JetRanger was written off as damaged beyond repair. A music concert at the Concord Pavilion was interrupted for a time due to a power surge, and 23,000 homes were left without power until morning. A section of Route 37 was closed for days afterward, and the tower was later repaired.

== Investigation ==
The aircraft had to be left hanging from the tower until investigators from the National Transportation Safety Board (NTSB) could examine it. The inquiry found the pilot had considerable geographic knowledge of the area and decided to fly VFR when conditions would indicate use of instrument flight rules (IFR). Witnesses saw the helicopter flying parallel to CA 37 at about 200 ft (60 m) altitude above ground level and then explode as it collided with the tower. The area sectional chart clearly showed the location and height of the high-voltage tower.

The NTSB's final conclusion was: "The pilot's intentional flight into known adverse weather, continued flight into instrument meteorological conditions, and improper altitude. Contributing to the accident were low ceilings, poor visibility, and restricted visual lookout."

== See also ==
- 2006 Mercy Air Bell 412 crash
- Death of Stevie Ray Vaughan
- Vauxhall helicopter crash
