= Alpine Valley Resort (Wisconsin) =

Ski resort in Wisconsin, United States

- Location within the United States Location within Wisconsin
- Location: Town of Lafayette, Walworth County, Wisconsin, U.S.
- Nearest city: Elkhorn, Wisconsin (postal address)
- Coordinates: 42.736°N 88.428°W
- Skiable area: 90 acres (36 ha)
- Trails: 21
- Longest run: 3,000 ft (0.57 mi; 0.91 km)
- Lift system: 3 High speed quads 4 Triple chairs 5 Magic carpets
- Terrain parks: Yes
- Snowmaking: Yes
- Night skiing: Yes
- Website: alpinevalleyresort.com

Alpine Valley Resort is an all-season resort in the north central United States, located in the Town of Lafayette, Walworth County, Wisconsin. Southwest of Milwaukee, it has a golf course and alpine skiing; its longest run is 3,000 feet (0.57 mi; 0.91 km) in length.

== History ==
Once owned by the Boschert family, part of their family farm was sold off to a developer who created the resort. Ownership has changed several times since the resort was constructed. It is currently owned by Wisconsin Resorts, Inc. Eventually, the resort grew to include an amphitheater, which became Alpine Valley Music Theatre.

It was at Alpine Valley in 1990 that guitarist Stevie Ray Vaughan and four others were killed in a helicopter crash on the side of the ski hill. It happened following a Sunday night performance with his band Double Trouble, a concert which included Eric Clapton and Robert Cray. The accident occurred in fog shortly after midnight on Monday, August 27, 1990; it was one of four helicopters bound for Chicago, approximately seventy miles (110 km) to the southeast.

== See also ==
- List of ski areas and resorts in the United States
