= Credit Union 1 Arena =

Arena in Chicago, Illinois, US

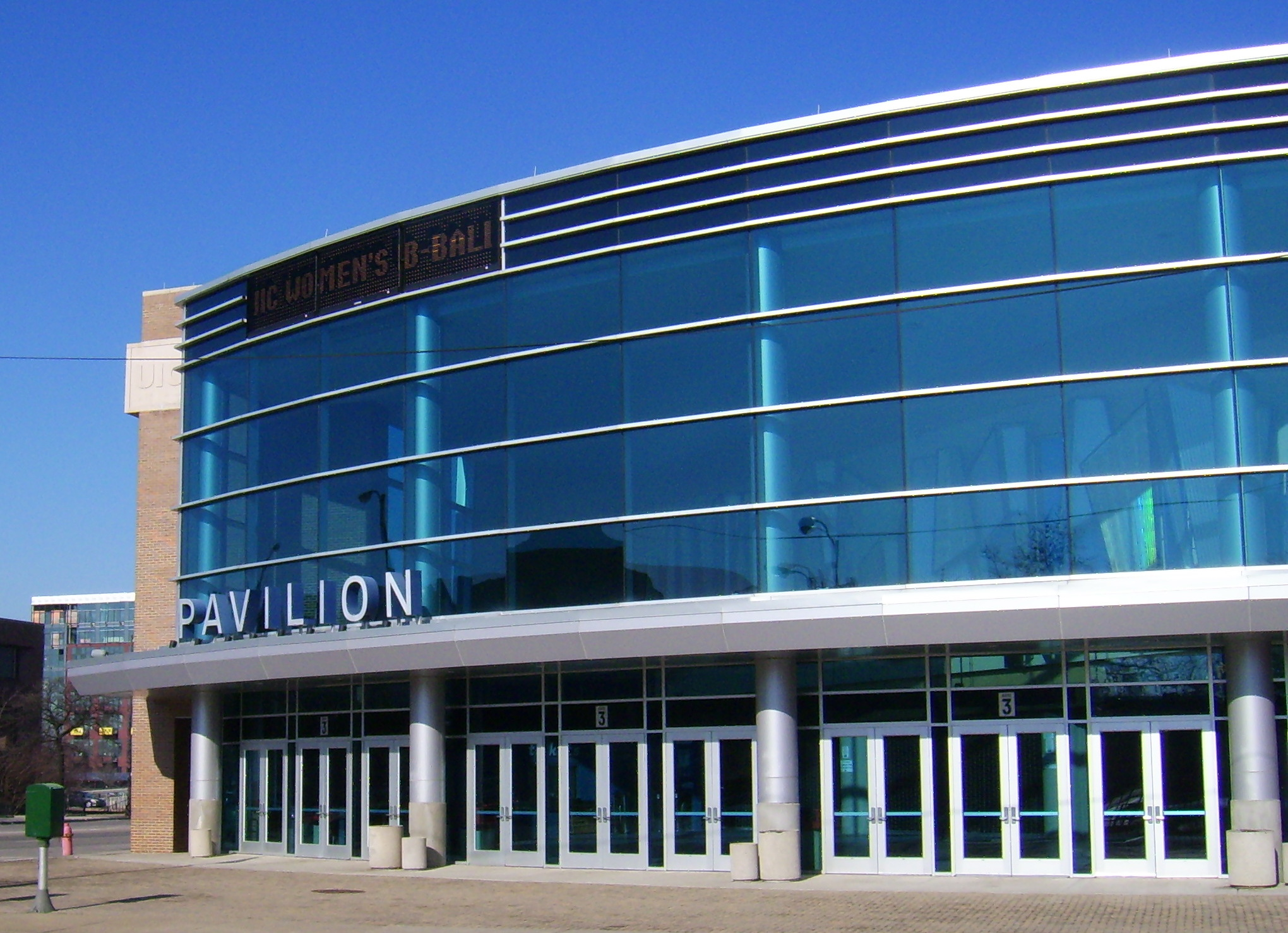
- Interactive map of Credit Union 1 Arena
- Former names: UIC Pavilion (1982–2018)
- Location: 525 South Racine Avenue; Chicago, Illinois 60607
- Coordinates: 41°52′29″N 87°39′22″W
- Owner: University of Illinois Chicago
- Operator: University of Illinois Chicago
- Capacity: 10,300 (concerts), 9,500 (boxing and wrestling), 8,000 (basketball)
- Surface: Concrete

Construction
- Groundbreaking: June 1, 1979
- Opened: May 31, 1982
- Renovated: 2001
- Cost: $10 million
- Architect: Skidmore, Owings and Merrill

Tenants
- UIC Flames basketball (NCAA D-1) (1982–present); UIC Flames men's ice hockey (NCAA D-1) (1982–1996); Chicago Cheetahs (RHI) (1994); Chicago Rockers (CBA) (1994–1996); Windy City Rollers (WFTDA) (2004–present); Chicago Storm (MISL II) (2004–2006); Chicago Sky (WNBA) (2006–2009); Chicago Eagles (CIF) (2016)

Credit Union 1 Arena (previously known as UIC Pavilion) is a multi-purpose arena located at 525 S. Racine Avenue on the Near West Side in Chicago, Illinois. It opened in 1982.

== Description and history ==
Credit Union 1 Arena is located on the campus of the University of Illinois Chicago. Originally named the UIC Pavilion, it opened in 1982, and was renovated in 2001. The arena is rented for many functions and concerts. It is accessible from the CTA Blue Line Racine stop, located one block north of the Pavilion. It is also accessible from the #7 Harrison Bus and the #60 Blue Island/26th Bus. It also hosted UIC's ice hockey team when they competed in the CCHA as well as the 1984, 1999, and 2000 Horizon League men's basketball conference tournament.

Credit Union 1 Arena is home to the UIC Flames men's and women's 's basketball teams and UIC Flames women's volleyball team. It is the former home of the Chicago Sky WNBA team and also serves as the home of the Windy City Rollers of the Women's Flat Track Derby Association. From 2004 to 2006 it also housed the Chicago Storm Major Indoor Soccer League team before they moved into the newly constructed Sears Centre. The UIC Pavilion was the home arena for Jim Crockett Promotions and World Championship Wrestling in the late 1980s and early 1990s. It was the site of three pay-per-view events: Starrcade 87, Chi-Town Rumble and Halloween Havoc 90. When used as a concert venue the arena seats up to 10,075 for end-stage shows, 7,924 for 3/4-house shows, and 5,878 for 1/2-house shows. The venue continues to be a regular host for major rock concerts, including notable sets from Green Day to Phish.

In 2016, it was the home of the Chicago Eagles of Champions Indoor Football. However, the team went on hiatus for the 2017 season.

In 2018, UIC signed a 15-year naming rights agreement with Credit Union 1, a credit union based in Illinois, and renamed the venue from UIC Pavilion to Credit Union 1 Arena.

The arena was officially the home court of the Chicago Smash of World TeamTennis; however, the Smash never played there, as World TeamTennis played its entire 2020 season at The Greenbrier in White Sulphur Springs, West Virginia and its entire 2021 season at Indian Wells Tennis Garden in California, and the team is not returning for WTT's next season in 2026.

== Notable events ==
=== 1980s ===
- April 10, 1983: Prince performed the final show of his 1999 Tour at the arena.
- November 18, 1983: Black Sabbath performed at the arena on their sold-out Born Again Tour, featuring Deep Purple's Ian Gillan on vocals.
- June 8, 1984: David Gilmour performed at the Pavilion on his first solo tour, supporting his 1984 release "About Face".
- February 16–17, 1985: Deep Purple performed at the arena on their sold-out Perfect Strangers tour.
- May 18, 1985: Madonna performed at the arena on her first tour, the Virgin Tour. Beastie Boys were the opening act.
- March 4, 1987: Bon Jovi performed at the arena, with parts of the footage used in the "Wanted Dead or Alive" music video.
- April 9–11, 1987: The Grateful Dead performed at the arena.
- November 26, 1987: Starrcade '87: Chi-Town Heat took place at the arena.
- July 29, 1988: Run-DMC performed at the arena as part of Run's House Tour. Opening acts were Public Enemy and DJ Jazzy Jeff & the Fresh Prince.
- November 17, 1988: Metallica performed at the arena as part of the Damaged Justice tour promoting their fourth album, ...And Justice for All (1988).
- December 13, 1988: The SuperClash III pay-per-view took place at the arena.
- February 20, 1989: The Chi-Town Rumble took place at the arena.
- June 14, 1989: Eazy-E and N.W.A performed at the arena as part of their Eazy Duz It Tour. Opening acts included Kid 'n Play, J.J. Fad, Kwamé, and Too Short.
- October 28, 1989: The Fire Meets the Fury Tour Stevie Ray Vaughan and Jeff Beck took place at the arena.

=== 1990s ===
- October 27, 1990: Halloween Havoc 90 took place at the arena.
- November 4, 1990: MC Hammer performs as part of his Please Hammer Don't Hurt 'Em World Tour.
- November 25, 1990: Ice Cube and Too $hort headlined a concert as part of their Straight from the Underground Tour. Opening acts included Poor Righteous Teachers, D-Nice, Yo-Yo, and Kid Rock.
- 1993 Luis Miguel performed for his Aries tour
- June 18 and November 25, 1994: Phish performed at the arena, with both concerts released in full on the band's 2012 box set Chicago '94.
- February 16, 1996: The World Air Games, a high jump competition, was held at the arena.

=== 2000s ===
- October 31, 2001: Rock band Widespread Panic held their annual Halloween show at the arena, delighting crowds with first time covers of Frank Zappa's "Joes Garage" and The Temptations' "Ball of Confusion".
- October 12, 2003: Members of the US national men's and women's gymnastics teams participated at a show at the arena.
- November 24, 2006: Comedy rock duo Tenacious D performed at the arena in their The Pick of Destiny Tour, with Neil Hamburger opening.
- May 19, 2007: Reggaeton duo Wisin & Yandel performer at their Los Vaqueros Tour
- October 3 – November 3, 2007: The arena hosted the 2007 AIBA World Boxing Championships, the largest championship in the organization's history.
- April 25, 2009: The arena held WEC 40, televised as WEC 40: Torres vs. Mizugaki (2009).

=== 2010s ===
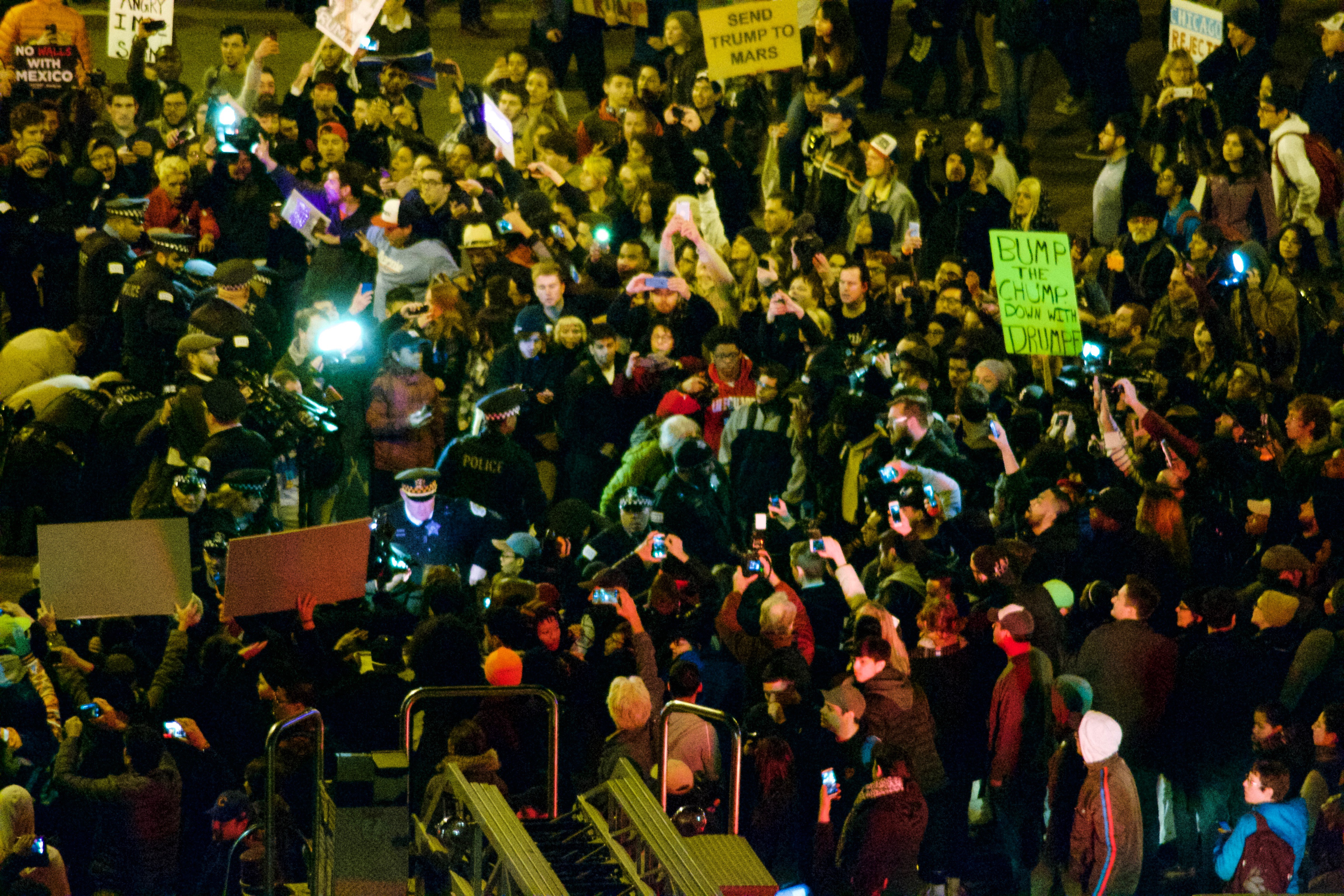
Demonstrators outside the arena protesting a scheduled Trump rally on March 11, 2016.

- November 5–7, 2010: The arena hosted the 2010 WFTDA Championships, also called the "Uproar on the Lakeshore".
- July 24, 2010: The arena hosted the CoverGirl Classic event for USA Gymnastics.
- July 23, 2011: The arena again hosted the CoverGirl Classic event for USA Gymnastics, its second consecutive year as the venue.
- May 23–24, 2012: The arena hosted the first two days of the World Summit of Nobel Peace Laureates. The event was held simultaneous to the meeting of NATO leaders in the 2012 Chicago summit.
- May 26, 2012: The arena hosted the Secret U.S. Classic event for USA Gymnastics.
- November 4, 2013: Macklemore & Ryan Lewis perform as part of The Heist World Tour, Talib Kweli, and Big K.R.I.T. opened the show.
- Sept 17, 2015: The Chicago Sky defeated the Indiana Fever before a crowd of 4,098 people at the arena in Game 1 of an Eastern Conference Semifinal series for the 2015 WNBA Playoffs.
- March 11, 2016: Unrest between protesters and supporters of Republican presidential candidate Donald Trump occurred after a political rally scheduled to occur at the arena was canceled.
- Feb 16, 2018: The Glory 50: Chicago kickboxing event was held at the arena.
- Feb 28, 2018: Rock band A Day to Remember performed to a sold-out crowd on their 15 Years in the Making tour, the largest crowd the band had played for to date.
- April 20–22, 2018: The arena hosted the 2018 NCAA Men's Gymnastics Championships.
- November 15, 2018: The UIC Pavilion is renamed the Credit Union 1 Arena.

=== 2020s ===
- November 24, 2021: Rapper Playboi Carti performed at Credit Union 1 Arena as part of his highly anticipated King Vamp Tour with his members of his record label, Opium. The tour, promoting his critically acclaimed album Whole Lotta Red, drew a large and enthusiastic crowd.
- February 5, 2022: The inaugural game of the Donda Doves, the basketball team of Kanye West's Donda Academy, took place at the arena.
- March 30, 2023: U.S. Senator Bernie Sanders spoke at the arena ahead of the runoff for the 2023 Chicago mayoral election.
- May 15, 2023: The arena served as the venue for the inauguration of Brandon Johnson, the 57th and current mayor of Chicago.
- March 8, 2024: The arena served as the venue for a concert by the American rock band The Strokes to benefit Illinois 7th congressional candidate Kina Collins during her 2024 campaign. Others who performed that concert were American rock band Beach Bunny, who served as The Strokes opener.
- August 23, 2026: The arena will host Total Nonstop Action Wrestling's (TNA) pay-per-view event Lockdown. This marks the return of the event since it was discontinued after the 2016 edition.

== See also ==
- List of NCAA Division I basketball arenas
- Credit Union 1 Amphitheatre

Events and tenants
Preceded by first arena	Home of the Chicago Storm; 2004 – 2006	Succeeded by Sears Centre
Preceded by first arena	Home of the Chicago Sky; 2006 – 2009	Succeeded by Allstate Arena
Preceded by Stade Pierre-Mauroy; Villeneuve-d'Ascq	FIVB Volleyball Men's Nations League; Final Venue; 2019	Succeeded by Rimini Fiera; Rimini
