= Death of Stevie Ray Vaughan =

1990 helicopter crash in Wisconsin, U.S.

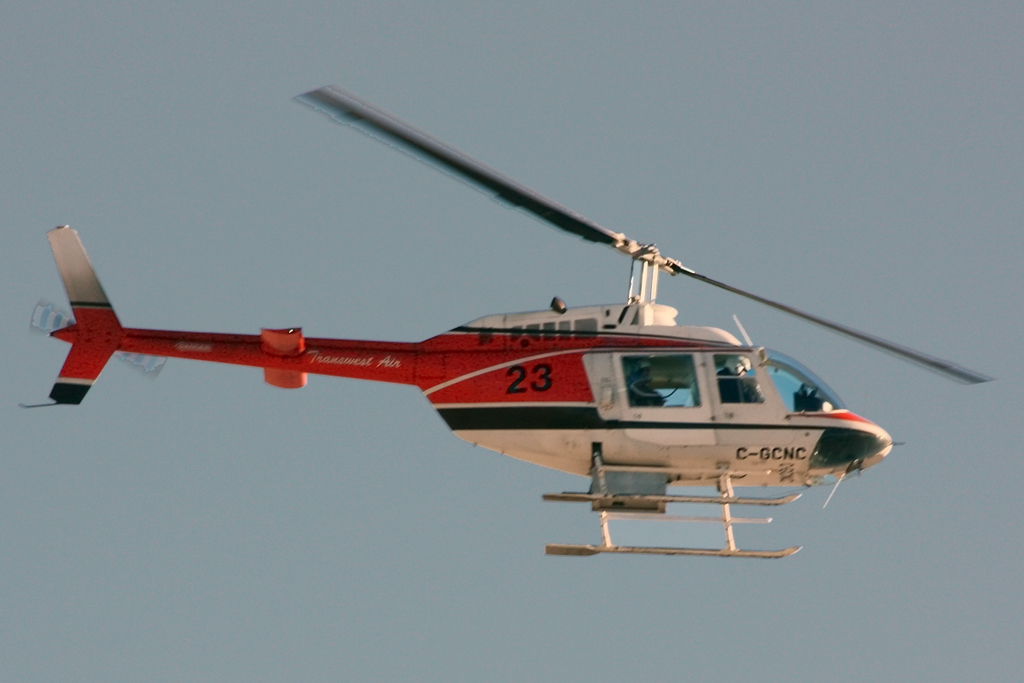
- A Bell 206B similar to the accident aircraft
- Date: August 27, 1990
- Location: Alpine Valley Resort East Troy, Wisconsin, U.S.; 42°43′55″N 88°25′30″W
- Cause: Controlled flight into terrain
- Deaths: 5
- Burial: August 31, 1990, Laurel Land Cemetery; Dallas, Texas, U.S.
- Inquest: October 24, 1990 in Elkhorn, Walworth County, Wisconsin, U.S.
- Coroner: John T. Griebel
- Verdict: Death by misadventure

Alpine
Valley (the United States)
Alpine Valley (Wisconsin)

In the early morning of Monday, August 27, 1990, American musician Stevie Ray Vaughan was killed in a helicopter crash near East Troy, Wisconsin, at age 35. He was one of the most influential blues guitarists of the 1980s, described by the Rock and Roll Hall of Fame as "the second coming of the blues".

Vaughan spent his last days performing with his band Double Trouble as the opening act for Eric Clapton at Alpine Valley Music Theatre, thirty miles (50 km) southwest of Milwaukee. After the concert concluded, Vaughan and three members of Clapton's entourage boarded a helicopter that crashed into the side of a nearby ski hill shortly after takeoff. The Civil Air Patrol was notified of the crash at 4:30 am, and authorities were called to locate the scene of the accident. All five people were pronounced dead on arrival. The autopsy concluded that Vaughan suffered multiple internal injuries and died of exsanguination (bleeding to death) due to blunt trauma of the chest and abdomen.

At the inquest, the coroner found no evidence of drug or alcohol use and recorded death by misadventure. The National Transportation Safety Board (NTSB) concluded that the pilot failed to gain sufficient altitude to avoid rising terrain.

Vaughan was buried at Laurel Land Cemetery in Dallas, Texas, on August 31, 1990. In 1992, his family filed a wrongful death lawsuit against Omniflight Helicopters, which was settled for an undisclosed amount in 1995.

== Accident ==
The day before his death, Stevie Ray Vaughan allegedly told his band and crew members about a nightmare that he had in which he was at his own funeral and saw thousands of mourners. He felt "terrified, yet almost peaceful". Backstage after the show that evening, the musicians talked about playing together again, particularly with Eric Clapton for a series of dates at London's Royal Albert Hall in early 1991 as a tribute to Jimi Hendrix. Moments later, Clapton's tour manager, Peter Jackson, said that the weather was getting worse and they had to leave soon. Vaughan's last words to drummer Chris Layton were, "I love ya."

Four helicopters were waiting on a golf course to transport concert group members to Chicago. Vaughan boarded the third helicopter alongside Clapton's agent Bobby Brooks, bodyguard Nigel Browne, and assistant tour manager Colin Smythe. His brother, Jimmie Vaughan, alongside Jimmie's wife, was also set to board. However, due to a last-minute change, only one seat was available, which Stevie tentatively took. The helicopter, a Bell 206B Jet Ranger, was piloted by Jeff Brown. It departed in dense fog at 1 am. Brown piloted the helicopter off the golf course, at a higher speed and slightly lower altitude than the others. It banked sharply to the left, and crashed into the side of a 300-foot (90 m) ski slope, about 0.6 miles (1 km) from takeoff. All on board were killed instantly; no fire or explosion occurred, and the bodies and debris were scattered over two hundred feet (60 m). No one was aware of the crash until the helicopter failed to arrive at its destination.

A Wisconsin Civil Air Patrol search airplane found the wreckage at 7 am, fifty feet (15 m) below the summit of the hill. Shortly after, Clapton and Jimmie Vaughan were called to the morgue to identify the bodies. According to an autopsy report, Vaughan had suffered many unsurvivable injuries, such as transection and dissection of the aorta and multiple depressed skull fractures, along with a ruptured spleen and liver and fractures of the right thigh bone and ribs. An investigation found that no drugs or alcohol were involved, and that all victims had worn seatbelts. No mechanical failures or malfunctions were found with the helicopter.

Brown had many hours of experience operating the Bell 206B at night, but was only instrument rated on airplanes, not helicopters. In fact, not long before the flight, he had failed an instrument check ride. According to the NTSB, the cause of the accident was deemed controlled flight into terrain, as Brown could not see the hill due to low visibility.

== Aftermath ==
Vaughan's death triggered an outpouring of grief around the world. The album Family Style, the only collaboration recorded with his brother Jimmie, was released in September 1990 and became Vaughan's best-selling non-Double Trouble album. On August 31, Vaughan was buried at Laurel Land Memorial Park in Dallas. Funeral services were held with over 1,500 people attending and 3,000 more outside the chapel. His fiancée, Janna Lapidus, and Jimmie and Martha Vaughan were in attendance. Among the other mourners were Clapton, Stevie Wonder, Buddy Guy, Dr. John, ZZ Top, Bonnie Raitt, Jackson Browne, and Nile Rodgers.

Omniflight, the company that owned and operated the helicopter, was sued for negligence by Martha and Jimmie Vaughan. They claimed that pilot Jeff Brown operated the helicopter recklessly under visual flight rules (VFR) while in instrument meteorological conditions. The lawsuit ended in a settlement. The widows of Clapton's bodyguard, Nigel Browne, and assistant tour manager, Colin Smythe, received more than $2 million in settlements.

== Memorials and tributes ==
Jimmie Vaughan later co-wrote and recorded a song in tribute to his brother and other deceased blues guitarists titled "Six Strings Down". Bonnie Raitt's 1991 album Luck of the Draw was dedicated to him. Many other artists recorded songs in remembrance of Vaughan, including Eric Johnson, Tommy Emmanuel, Buddy Guy, Steve Vai, Ezra Charles, White Lion, and Wayne Perkins. Stevie Wonder, whose "Superstition" Vaughan covered, honored him with "Stevie Ray Blues" on his 1995 live album Natural Wonder. Musicians such as Joe Bonamassa, John Mayer, Robert Randolph, Kenny Wayne Shepherd, Mark Tremonti, Chris Duarte, Colin James, Los Lonely Boys, Mike McCready, Eric Johnson, Orianthi, John Petrucci, and Doyle Bramhall II have cited Vaughan as an influence.

An annual motorcycle ride and concert in Dallas benefits the Stevie Ray Vaughan Memorial Scholarship Fund. The city of Austin, Texas, erected the Stevie Ray Vaughan Memorial Statue at Auditorium Shores on Lady Bird Lake, the site of a number of his concerts. It has become one of the city's most popular tourist attractions. Since 1998, St. Louis, Missouri, has hosted an annual Stevie Ray Vaughan Tribute Concert around Thanksgiving featuring local musicians. In 2000, Vaughan was inducted into the Blues Hall of Fame. He also became eligible for the Rock and Roll Hall of Fame in 2008. In 2008, residents voted to rename Industrial Boulevard in Dallas, with Vaughan's name being one of the finalists, alongside Stanley Marcus, Eddie Bernice Johnson, and César Chávez. In the end, it was renamed to Riverfront Boulevard. Stevie Ray Vaughan was eventually inducted to the Rock and Roll Hall of Fame in 2015 by John Mayer.

== See also ==
- 1991 Bill Graham Helicopter Crash
- The Day the Music Died

== Bibliography ==
- Dickerson, James (September 25, 2004). The fabulous Vaughan Brothers: Jimmie and Stevie Ray. Lanham, Maryland: Taylor Trade Publishing. ISBN 978-1-58979-116-9.
- Everitt, Rich (September 2004). Falling Stars: Air Crashes That Filled Rock and Roll Heaven. Atlanta, GA: Harbor House. ISBN 978-1-891799-04-4.
- Gregory, Hugh (2003). Roadhouse blues: Stevie Ray Vaughan and Texas R&B. San Francisco: Backbeat Books. ISBN 978-0-87930-747-9.
- Kitts, Jeff (1997). Guitar World Presents Stevie Ray Vaughan: ... from the pages of Guitar World magazine. Hal Leonard. ISBN 978-0-7935-8080-4.
- Leigh, Keri (1993). Stevie Ray: Soul to Soul. Lanham, Maryland: Taylor Trade Publishing.
- Patoski, Joe Nick; Bill Crawford (1993). Stevie Ray Vaughan: Caught in the Crossfire. Little, Brown. ISBN 978-0-316-16068-1.
