= Fuel for Life Tour =

1986 concert tour by Judas Priest

- Tour by Judas Priest
- Poster to the concert in Copenhagen, Denmark
- Associated album: Turbo
- Start date: 2 May 1986
- End date: 16 December 1986
- No. of shows: 105

Judas Priest concert chronology
- Metal Conqueror Tour (1984); Fuel for Life Tour (1986); Mercenaries of Metal Tour (1988)

The Fuel for Life Tour was a 1986 concert tour by English heavy metal band Judas Priest, to support their album Turbo.

== Recordings ==
The band's second live album Priest...Live! and their DVD set Electric Eye feature performances recorded at The Omni, Atlanta, Georgia on 15 June 1986 and the Reunion Arena, Dallas, Texas on 27 June 1986. The 30th anniversary edition of Turbo, released in 2017, features a 2-disc live recorded performance from the 22 May 1986 show at Sandstone Amphitheater in Bonner Springs, Kansas. Other official live recordings include "Desert Plains" (Point of Entry bonus track), "Locked In" (Turbo bonus track), "Hell Bent for Leather" (Priest... Live! bonus track), "Private Property" ("Parental Guidance" b-side) and "Love Bites" (Metalogy), all recorded at Kiel Auditorium, St. Louis, Missouri, on 23 May 1986.

The video documentary Heavy Metal Parking Lot was recorded prior to the Judas Priest concert at the Capital Centre, on 31 May 1986.

== Production ==
The stage design featured several platforms resembling futuristic, sleek, mechanical parts. At the back of the stage was a large robot prop with mechanical arms that would lift the band's guitarists and Rob Halford during performances.

During the North American leg of the tour, the band had hired a drum technician, Jonathan Valen, to operate electronic drumming equipment and a sample trigger for backing vocals and some guitar effects. Due to the limitations of technology at the time, these devices required a person to operate them manually.

== Setlist ==
The average setlist was as follows. The setlist predominantly featured songs released in the 1980s, particularly omitting all pre-Killing Machine material, except "Victim of Changes". On early US dates, the Turbo song "Hot for Love" and Point of Entry's "Desert Plains" were performed, while "Parental Guidance" was omitted. The Fuel For Life tour also included some of the few Judas Priest shows where "Victim of Changes" was left off the set list.

1. "Out in the Cold"
2. "Locked In"
3. "Heading Out to the Highway"
4. "Metal Gods"
5. "Breaking the Law"
6. "Love Bites"
7. "Some Heads Are Gonna Roll"
8. "The Sentinel"
9. "Hot For Love" (dropped after May 12, 1986)
10. "Private Property"
11. "Desert Plains" (replaced by "Parental Guidance" after August 12, 1986)
12. "Rock You All Around the World"
13. "The Hellion / Electric Eye"
14. "Turbo Lover"
15. "Freewheel Burning"
16. "Victim of Changes"
17. "The Green Manalishi (With the Two Prong Crown)"
18. "Living After Midnight"
19. "You've Got Another Thing Comin'"
20. "Hell Bent for Leather"

On the last night of the tour "Screaming for Vengeance" and "Diamonds and Rust" were also played.

== Tour dates ==
The venues and events of the tour were located in North America, Europe and, Japan. They were supported by Dokken on the American leg, Bon Jovi on the Canadian tour dates from 14 to 27 July, Krokus on 6 and 8 August, Loudness on 31 August, and Warlock on the European leg.

According to Rob Halford, the opening show of the tour in Albuquerque, was his very first performance after becoming sober and drug-free.

Date	City	Country	Venue
2 May 1986	Albuquerque	United States	Tingley Coliseum
4 May 1986	Denver	United States	Denver Coliseum
6 May 1986	Salt Lake City	United States	Salt Palace
8 May 1986	Chandler	United States	Compton Terrace
9 May 1986	Laguna Hills	United States	Irvine Meadows Amphitheatre
10 May 1986	San Diego	United States	San Diego Sports Arena
11 May 1986	Los Angeles	United States	LA Sports Arena
12 May 1986	Los Angeles	United States	LA Sports Arena
14 May 1986	Fresno	United States	Selland Arena
15 May 1986	Oakland	United States	Oakland Coliseum
16 May 1986	Sacramento	United States	Cal Expo Amphitheater
18 May 1986	Tacoma	United States	Tacoma Dome
19 May 1986	Spokane	United States	Spokane Coliseum
22 May 1986	Kansas City	United States	Sandstone Amphitheater
23 May 1986	St. Louis	United States	Kiel Auditorium
24 May 1986	Chicago	United States	Rosemont Horizon
25 May 1986	Saint Paul	United States	Saint Paul Civic Center
26 May 1986	Des Moines	United States	Des Moines Veterans Memorial Auditorium
27 May 1986	Kalamazoo	United States	Wings Stadium
28 May 1986	Detroit	United States	Cobo Hall
29 May 1986	Dayton	United States	Hara Arena
30 May 1986	Richfield	United States	Richfield Coliseum
31 May 1986	Landover	United States	Capital Centre
1 June 1986	Philadelphia	United States	Spectrum
4 June 1986	Providence	United States	Providence Civic Center
5 June 1986	Worcester	United States	Worcester Centrum
6 June 1986	East Rutherford	United States	Meadowlands Arena
7 June 1986	New Haven	United States	New Haven Veterans Memorial Coliseum
9 June 1986	Uniondale	United States	Nassau Veterans Memorial Coliseum
10 June 1986	Rochester	United States	Rochester Community War Memorial
12 June 1986	Hampton	United States	Hampton Coliseum
13 June 1986	Richmond	United States	Richmond Coliseum
14 June 1986	Charlotte	United States	Charlotte Coliseum
15 June 1986	Atlanta	United States	The Omni
17 June 1986	Lakeland	United States	Lakeland Civic Center
18 June 1986	Hollywood	United States	Hollywood Sportatorium
21 June 1986	Houston	United States	The Summit
22 June 1986	Austin	United States	Frank Erwin Center
23 June 1986	San Antonio	United States	San Antonio Convention Center
25 June 1986	El Paso	United States	El Paso County Coliseum
26 June 1986	Odessa	United States	Ector County Coliseum
27 June 1986	Dallas	United States	Reunion Arena
28 June 1986	Norman	United States	Lloyd Noble Center
13 July 1986	Saint Paul	United States	St. Paul Civic Center
14 July 1986	Vancouver	Canada	Pacific Coliseum
16 July 1986	Calgary	Canada	Saddledome
17 July 1986	Edmonton	Canada	Northlands Coliseum
19 July 1986	Winnipeg	Canada	Winnipeg Arena
23 July 1986	Montreal	Canada	Montreal Forum
24 July 1986	Quebec City	Canada	Colisée de Québec
25 July 1986	Ottawa	Canada	Ottawa Civic Centre
27 July 1986	Buffalo	United States	Buffalo Memorial Auditorium
29 July 1986	Troy	United States	RPI Field House
31 July 1986	Portland	United States	Cumberland County Civic Center
3 August 1986	Toledo	United States	Toledo Sports Arena
5 August 1986	Pittsburgh	United States	Pittsburgh Civic Arena
6 August 1986	Cincinnati	United States	Cincinnati Gardens
8 August 1986	Saginaw	United States	Wendler Arena
9 August 1986	Detroit	United States	Joe Louis Arena
10 August 1986	Hoffman Estates	United States	Poplar Creek Music Theater
11 August 1986	Rosemont	United States	Rosemont Horizon
12 August 1986	Indianapolis	United States	Market Square Arena
14 August 1986	Green Bay	United States	Brown County Arena
15 August 1986	East Troy	United States	Alpine Valley Music Theatre
16 August 1986	Cedar Rapids	United States	Five Seasons Center
17 August 1986	Peoria	United States	Peoria Civic Center
19 August 1986	Wichita	United States	Kansas Coliseum
21 August 1986	Evansville	United States	Roberts Municipal Stadium
22 August 1986	Nashville	United States	Starwood Amphitheatre
23 August 1986	Biloxi	United States	Mississippi Coast Coliseum
27 August 1986	Baltimore	United States	Baltimore Civic Center
28 August 1986	Springfield	United States	Springfield Civic Center
29 August 1986	East Rutherford	United States	Meadowlands Arena
31 August 1986	Toronto	Canada	CNE Stadium
28 September 1986	Zwolle	Netherlands	IJsselhallen
30 September 1986	Offenbach am Main	West Germany	Stadhalle
1 October 1986	Offenbach am Main	West Germany	Stadhalle
2 October 1986	Stuttgart	West Germany	Böblingen Sporthalle
3 October 1986	Würzburg	West Germany	Carl Diem Halle
4 October 1986	Winterthur	Switzerland	Eulachhalle
5 October 1986	Munich	West Germany	Olympiahalle
8 October 1986	Madrid	Spain	Estadio Roman Valero
9 October 1986	Madrid	Spain	Estadio Roman Valero
11 October 1986	San Sebastián	Spain	Velódromo de Anoeta
13 October 1986	Barcelona	Spain	Palau dels Esports de Barcelona
15 October 1986	Ludwigshafen	West Germany	Friedrich-Ebert-Halle
16 October 1986	Saarbrücken	West Germany	Saarlandhalle
17 October 1986	Essen	West Germany	Grugahalle
18 October 1986	Brussels	Belgium	Forest National
20 October 1986	Paris	France	Le Zénith
22 October 1986	Hanover	West Germany	Eilenriedehalle
23 October 1986	Copenhagen	Denmark	Falkoner Center
24 October 1986	Stockholm	Sweden	Johanneshovs Isstadion
25 October 1986	Gothenburg	Sweden	Frölundaborg
27 October 1986	Drammen	Norway	Drammenshallen
29 October 1986	Helsinki	Finland	Helsinki Ice Hall
3 December 1986	Yokohama	Japan	Yokohama Cultural Gymnasium
4 December 1986	Tokyo	Japan	Nippon Budokan
6 December 1986	Nagoya	Japan	Kokaido Hall
8 December 1986	Osaka	Japan	Festival Hall
10 December 1986	Osaka	Japan	Koseinenkin Hall
11 December 1986	Fukuoka	Japan	Fukuoka Sunpalace
13 December 1986	Yokohama	Japan	Yokohama Cultural Gymnasium
16 December 1986	Honolulu	United States	Neil Blaisdell Center

== Boxscore ==
City	Venue	Tickets sold / available	Gross revenue
Albuquerque	Tingley Coliseum	8,256 / 10,656	$118,033
Denver	Coliseum	8,610 / 12,500	$136,814
Phoenix	Compton Terrace	11,263 / 13,289	$160,610
Laguna Hills	Irvine Meadows Amphitheatre	14,954 / 15,000	$180,219
San Diego	Sports Arena	11,377 / 11,377	$157,234
Los Angeles	LA Sports Arena	19,917/ 19,917	$323,224
Oakland	Oakland Coliseum	14,453 / 14,453	$214,710
Sacramento	Cal Expo Amphitheater	7,400 / 12,200	$122,100
Tacoma	Tacoma Dome	19,529 / 20,000	$312,464
Kalamazoo	Wings Stadium	6,623 / 8,113	$92,722
Dayton	Hara Arena	8,000 / 8,000	$104,916
Richfield	Coliseum	11,551 / 18,000	$161,714
Landover	Capitol Centre	17,348 / 17,348	$251,546
Philadelphia	Spectrum	14,009 / 14,009	$195,566
Providence	Civic Center	9,143 / 9,784	$119,137
Worcester	The Centrum	11,110 / 12,150	$145,174
Charlotte	Coliseum	7,716 / 12,900	$108,503
Atlanta	The Omni	7,225 / 17,037	$108,375
Dallas	Reunion Arena	14,121 / 19,000	$221,210
Pittsburgh	Civic Arena	7,002 / 12,500	$96,277
Cincinnati	Gardens	5,987 / 9,500	$83,152
Detroit	Joe Louis Arena	8,850 / 12,000	$132,750
Biloxi	Mississippi Coast Coliseum	7,881 / 10,000	$114,275
Baltimore	Civic Center	8,815 / 13,641	$123,961
Toronto	CNE Grandstand	13,780 / 15,000	$217,724

== Personnel ==
- Rob Halford – lead vocals
- Glenn Tipton – guitar
- K.K. Downing – guitar
- Ian Hill – bass
- Dave Holland – drums
- Jonathan Valen – electric drummer technician (American leg)
- Jim Silvia – tour manager
- Mick Double – production manager
- Patricia La Magna – production assistant (American leg)
- Jayne Andrews – production assistant (European leg)
- Tom McPhillips – stage design
