= Firepower World Tour =

2018–19 concert tour by Judas Priest

- Tour by Judas Priest
- Location: North America; Europe; South America; Asia; Oceania
- Associated album: Firepower
- Start date: 13 March 2018
- End date: 29 June 2019
- No. of shows: 143 (165 scheduled); 90 in North America; 31 in Europe; 9 in South America; 10 in Asia; 3 in Oceania

Judas Priest concert chronology
- Redeemer of Souls Tour (2014–2015); Firepower World Tour (2018–2019); 50 Heavy Metal Years Tour (2021–2022)

The Firepower World Tour was a worldwide concert tour by English heavy metal band Judas Priest, in support of the album Firepower. It ran from 13 March 2018 to 29 June 2019.

== Background ==
This tour marked the first time that guitarist Glenn Tipton would not perform on a full-length tour after revealing the news that he had been diagnosed with Parkinson's disease on 12 February 2018 and would step down from touring as the disease's progression left him unable to perform the more challenging material. He stated that he was still a member of Judas Priest despite his diagnosis and would not rule out future on-stage appearances. Producer and guitarist Andy Sneap stepped in to perform in his place for the tour. Guitarist Richie Faulkner assured fans that Tipton would perform with the band again. At the 20 March 2018 show in Newark, Tipton joined the band on stage to perform "Metal Gods", "Breaking the Law" and "Living After Midnight", then "Victim of Changes" and "No Surrender" on later dates. He would continue to appear on tour, performing only the encore songs, but would not perform on certain dates, depending on his health. Tipton did not make any more appearances on the remaining dates due to his illness, as explained by bassist Ian Hill. After the completion of the world tour, Faulkner thanked fans worldwide for attending their shows, "It's been emotional and amazing to see you all and share in the celebration of heavy metal all around the world. It's been a pleasure and an honour to serve. See ya on the next one RHRF DOTF."

== Rob Halford incident ==
Shortly into the song "Judas Rising" at the 25 May 2019 show in Rosemont, Rob Halford kicked a cell phone out of a fan's hands in frustration as the fan had the phone light on while filming the show, causing difficulty on his performance. Halford explained in a statement soon after that fans are free to capture footage of their shows, "However if you physically interfere with The Metal God's performance you now know what will happen." Uriah Heep vocalist Bernie Shaw stepped in to defend Halford and said that he understood his frustration, but felt that he took it "a little bit too far", and opined that his "space was invaded." He thought that Halford "overreacted — but I can sure understand where it came from."

== Lineup ==
- Rob Halford – vocals
- Richie Faulkner – guitars, backing vocals
- Ian Hill – bass guitar
- Scott Travis – drums, backing vocals
- Andy Sneap – guitars, backing vocals (touring)
- Glenn Tipton – guitars (occasional appearances)

== Support acts ==
- Saxon & Black Star Riders (13 March 2018 – 1 May 2018; except on 30 March, 21 April & 5 May shows)
- Megadeth (5 June 2018, 10 June 2018 – 13 June 2018, 19 June 2018 – 20 June 2018 & 26 June 2018)
- Lords of Black (28 June 2018)
- Ozzy Osbourne (Judas Priest was the opening band for Osbourne at the 2 July 2018 show)
- Rehmorha (22 July 2018)
- Ørdøg (24 July 2018)
- Accept (28 July 2018)
- Black Star Riders (31 July 2018)
- Uriah Heep (8 August 2018)
- Deep Purple & The Temperance Movement (21 August 2018 – 30 September 2018)
- Helloween, Kreator, Arch Enemy, etc. (26 October 2018)
- Alice in Chains & Black Star Riders (2 November 2018 – 11 November 2018)
- Babymetal (4 December 2018)
- Disconnected (27 January 2019)
- Halestorm (16 March 2019)
- Uriah Heep (3 May 2019 – 29 June 2019; except on 4 May 2019)

== Setlists ==
The 2018 to early 2019 setlist featured material from Firepower, fan favourites and material that was not performed in decades such as "Bloodstone", "Some Heads Are Gonna Roll", "Tyrant", "Night Comes Down", "Delivering the Goods" and "Killing Machine". The song "Saints in Hell" was introduced to the audience which was never performed live. The third North American portion of the tour in 2019 featured an updated stage appearance and a brand new setlist featuring other tracks from Firepower, other various fan favourites, and a few more songs that were not played in decades such as "Out in the Cold", "All Guns Blazing" and "Hot Rockin'". The band introduced another song, "(Take These) Chains", which was also never performed live.

North America — Leg 1

13 March 2018 — 18 March 2018
1. "Guardians" (Intro)
2. "Firepower"
3. "Running Wild"
4. "Grinder"
5. "Sinner"
6. "The Ripper"
7. "Lightning Strike"
8. "Bloodstone"
9. "Saints in Hell"
10. "Turbo Lover"
11. "Angel"
12. "Evil Never Dies"
13. "Some Heads Are Gonna Roll"
14. "Breaking the Law"
15. "Hell Bent for Leather"
16. "Painkiller"

Encore

1. "The Hellion" (Intro)
2. "Electric Eye"
3. "Metal Gods"
4. "You've Got Another Thing Comin'"
5. "Living After Midnight"
20 March 2018 — 25 March 2018
1. "Guardians" (Intro)
2. "Firepower"
3. "Running Wild"
4. "Grinder"
5. "Sinner"
6. "The Ripper"
7. "Lightning Strike"
8. "Bloodstone"
9. "Saints in Hell"
10. "Turbo Lover"
11. "The Green Manalishi (With the Two Prong Crown)"
12. "Evil Never Dies"
13. "Some Heads Are Gonna Roll"
14. "You've Got Another Thing Comin'"
15. "Hell Bent for Leather"
16. "The Hellion" (Intro)
17. "Electric Eye"
18. "Painkiller"

Encore

1. "Metal Gods"
2. "Breaking the Law"
3. "Living After Midnight"

27 March 2018 — 13 April 2018
1. "Guardians" (Intro)
2. "Firepower"
3. "Running Wild"
4. "Grinder"
5. "Sinner"
6. "The Ripper"
7. "Lightning Strike"
8. "Bloodstone"
9. "Saints in Hell"
10. "Turbo Lover"
11. "The Green Manalishi (With the Two Prong Crown)"
12. "Evil Never Dies"
13. "Some Heads Are Gonna Roll"
14. "Breaking the Law"
15. "Hell Bent for Leather"
16. "Painkiller"

Encore

1. "The Hellion" (Intro)
2. "Electric Eye"
3. "Metal Gods"

Encore 2

1. "You've Got Another Thing Comin'"
2. "Living After Midnight"
15 April 2018 — 19 April 2018
1. "Guardians" (Intro)
2. "Firepower"
3. "Running Wild"
4. "Grinder"
5. "Sinner"
6. "The Ripper"
7. "Lightning Strike"
8. "Bloodstone"
9. "Saints in Hell"
10. "Turbo Lover"
11. "Freewheel Burning"
12. "Evil Never Dies"
13. "Some Heads Are Gonna Roll"
14. "You've Got Another Thing Comin'"
15. "Breaking the Law"
16. "Hell Bent for Leather"
17. "Painkiller"
18. "The Hellion" (Intro)
19. "Electric Eye"

Encore

1. "Metal Gods"
2. "Breaking the Law"
3. "Living After Midnight"

21 April 2018
1. "Guardians" (Intro)
2. "Firepower"
3. "Running Wild"
4. "Sinner"
5. "Lightning Strike"
6. "Bloodstone"
7. "Turbo Lover"
8. "Freewheel Burning"
9. "You've Got Another Thing Comin'"
10. "Hell Bent for Leather"
11. "Painkiller"

Encore

1. "Metal Gods"
2. "Breaking the Law"
3. "Living After Midnight"
22 April 2018 — 24 April 2018
1. "Guardians" (Intro)
2. "Firepower"
3. "Running Wild"
4. "Grinder"
5. "Sinner"
6. "The Ripper"
7. "Lightning Strike"
8. "Bloodstone"
9. "Saints in Hell"
10. "Turbo Lover"
11. "Freewheel Burning"
12. "Evil Never Dies"
13. "Some Heads Are Gonna Roll"
14. "You've Got Another Thing Comin'"
15. "The Hellion" (Intro)
16. "Electric Eye"
17. "Hell Bent for Leather"
18. "Painkiller"

Encore

1. "Metal Gods"
2. "Breaking the Law"
3. "Living After Midnight"

26 April 2018
1. "Guardians" (Intro)
2. "Firepower"
3. "Grinder"
4. "Sinner"
5. "The Ripper"
6. "Lightning Strike"
7. "Bloodstone"
8. "Saints in Hell"
9. "Turbo Lover"
10. "Freewheel Burning"
11. "Evil Never Dies"
12. "Some Heads Are Gonna Roll"
13. "You've Got Another Thing Comin'"
14. "The Hellion" (Intro)
15. "Electric Eye"
16. "Hell Bent for Leather"
17. "Painkiller"

Encore

1. "Metal Gods"
2. "Breaking the Law"
3. "Living After Midnight"
28 April 2018 — 29 April 2018
1. "Guardians" (Intro)
2. "Firepower"
3. "Running Wild"
4. "Grinder"
5. "Sinner"
6. "The Ripper"
7. "Lightning Strike"
8. "Bloodstone"
9. "Saints in Hell"
10. "Turbo Lover"
11. "Freewheel Burning"
12. "Evil Never Dies"
13. "Some Heads Are Gonna Roll"
14. "You've Got Another Thing Comin'"
15. "The Hellion" (Intro)
16. "Electric Eye"
17. "Hell Bent for Leather"
18. "Painkiller"

Encore

1. "Metal Gods"
2. "Breaking the Law"
3. "Living After Midnight"

1 May 2018
1. "Guardians" (Intro)
2. "Firepower"
3. "Running Wild"
4. "Grinder"
5. "Sinner"
6. "The Ripper"
7. "Lightning Strike"
8. "Bloodstone"
9. "Saints in Hell"
10. "Turbo Lover"
11. "Freewheel Burning"
12. "Evil Never Dies"
13. "Some Heads Are Gonna Roll"
14. "Tyrant"
15. "You've Got Another Thing Comin'"
16. "The Hellion" (Intro)
17. "Electric Eye"
18. "Hell Bent for Leather"
19. "Painkiller"

Encore

1. "Metal Gods"
2. "Breaking the Law"
3. "Living After Midnight"
5 May 2018
1. "Guardians" (Intro)
2. "Firepower"
3. "Grinder"
4. "Sinner"
5. "The Ripper"
6. "Lightning Strike"
7. "Bloodstone"
8. "Freewheel Burning"
9. "Saints in Hell"
10. "Evil Never Dies"
11. "Tyrant"
12. "Some Heads Are Gonna Roll"
13. "Breaking the Law"
14. "Hell Bent for Leather"
15. "Painkiller"

Encore

1. "The Hellion" (Intro)
2. "Electric Eye"
3. "Metal Gods"

Encore 2

1. "You've Got Another Thing Comin'"
2. "Living After Midnight"

Europe — Leg 1

5 June 2018
1. "Firepower Intro"
2. "Firepower"
3. "Grinder"
4. "Sinner"
5. "The Ripper"
6. "Lightning Strike"
7. "Bloodstone"
8. "Saints in Hell"
9. "Turbo Lover"
10. "Prelude (Intro)
11. "Tyrant"
12. "Night Comes Down"
13. "Some Heads Are Gonna Roll"
14. "Freewheel Burning"
15. "You've Got Another Thing Comin'"
16. "Hell Bent for Leather"
17. "Painkiller"

Encore

1. "Guardians" (Intro)
2. "Rising From Ruins"
3. "Metal Gods"
4. "Breaking the Law"
5. "Living After Midnight"
7 June 2018 — 15 June 2018
1. "Firepower Intro"
2. "Firepower"
3. "Grinder"
4. "Sinner"
5. "The Ripper"
6. "Lightning Strike"
7. "Bloodstone"
8. "Saints in Hell"
9. "Turbo Lover"
10. "Prelude" (Intro)
11. "Tyrant"
12. "Night Comes Down"
13. "Freewheel Burning"
14. "Rising from Ruins"
15. "You've Got Another Thing Comin'"
16. "Hell Bent for Leather"
17. "Painkiller"

Encore

1. "Metal Gods"
2. "Breaking the Law"
3. "Living After Midnight"
4. "Victim of Changes"

17 June 2018
1. "Firepower Intro"
2. "Firepower"
3. "Grinder"
4. "Sinner"
5. "Lightning Strike"
6. "Bloodstone"
7. "Turbo Lover"
8. "Prelude" (Intro)
9. "Tyrant"
10. "You've Got Another Thing Comin'"
11. "Hell Bent for Leather"
12. "Painkiller"
19 June 2018
1. "Firepower Intro"
2. "Firepower"
3. "Grinder"
4. "Sinner"
5. "The Ripper"
6. "Lightning Strike"
7. "Bloodstone"
8. "Saints in Hell"
9. "Turbo Lover"
10. "Prelude" (Intro)
11. "Tyrant"
12. "Night Comes Down"
13. "Freewheel Burning"
14. "You've Got Another Thing Comin'"
15. "Hell Bent for Leather"
16. "Painkiller"

Encore

1. "Guardians" (Intro)
2. "Rising From Ruins"
3. "Metal Gods"
4. "Breaking the Law"
5. "Living After Midnight"

20 June 2018
1. "Firepower Intro"
2. "Firepower"
3. "Grinder"
4. "Sinner"
5. "The Ripper"
6. "Lightning Strike"
7. "Bloodstone"
8. "Saints in Hell"
9. "Turbo Lover"
10. "Prelude" (Intro)
11. "Tyrant"
12. "Night Comes Down"
13. "Freewheel Burning"
14. "Guardians" (Intro)
15. "Rising from Ruins"
16. "Breaking the Law"
17. "Hell Bent for Leather"
18. "Painkiller"

Encore

1. "Metal Gods"
2. "You've Got Another Thing Comin'"
3. "Living After Midnight"
22 June 2018
1. "Firepower Intro"
2. "Firepower"
3. "Grinder"
4. "Sinner"
5. "The Ripper"
6. "Lightning Strike"
7. "Bloodstone"
8. "Saints in Hell"
9. "Turbo Lover"
10. "Prelude" (Intro)
11. "Tyrant"
12. "Night Comes Down"
13. "Freewheel Burning"
14. "Guardians" (Intro)
15. "Rising from Ruins"
16. "You've Got Another Thing Comin'"
17. "Hell Bent for Leather"
18. "Painkiller"

Encore

1. "Metal Gods"
2. "Breaking the Law"
3. "Living After Midnight"

24 June 2018
1. "Firepower Intro"
2. "Firepower"
3. "Grinder"
4. "Sinner"
5. "Lightning Strike"
6. "Bloodstone"
7. "Turbo Lover"
8. "Guardians" (Intro)
9. "Rising from Ruins"
10. "You've Got Another Thing Comin'"
11. "Hell Bent for Leather"
12. "Painkiller"

Encore

1. "Metal Gods"
2. "Breaking the Law"
3. "Living After Midnight"
26 June 2018
1. "Firepower Intro"
2. "Firepower"
3. "Grinder"
4. "Sinner"
5. "The Ripper"
6. "Lightning Strike"
7. "Bloodstone"
8. "Saints in Hell"
9. "Turbo Lover"
10. "Prelude" (Intro)
11. "Tyrant"
12. "Night Comes Down"
13. "Freewheel Burning"
14. "Guardians" (Intro)
15. "Rising from Ruins"
16. "You've Got Another Thing Comin'"
17. "Hell Bent for Leather"
18. "Painkiller"

Encore

1. "Metal Gods"
2. "Breaking the Law"
3. "Living After Midnight"

28 June 2018
1. "Firepower Intro"
2. "Firepower"
3. "Grinder"
4. "Sinner"
5. "The Ripper"
6. "Lightning Strike"
7. "Bloodstone"
8. "Saints in Hell"
9. "Turbo Lover"
10. "Prelude" (Intro)
11. "Tyrant"
12. "Night Comes Down"
13. "Freewheel Burning"
14. "Guardians" (Intro)
15. "Rising from Ruins"
16. "You've Got Another Thing Comin'"
17. "Hell Bent for Leather"
18. "Painkiller"

Encore

1. "Metal Gods"
2. "Breaking the Law"
3. "Living After Midnight"
4. "Victim of Changes"
30 June 2018
1. "Firepower Intro"
2. "Firepower"
3. "Grinder"
4. "Sinner"
5. "Lightning Strike"
6. "Bloodstone"
7. "Turbo Lover"
8. "Guardians" (Intro)
9. "Rising from Ruins"
10. "Freewheel Burning"
11. "You've Got Another Thing Comin'"
12. "Hell Bent for Leather"
13. "Painkiller"

Encore

1. "Metal Gods"
2. "Breaking the Law"
3. "Living After Midnight"

2 July 2018
1. "Firepower Intro"
2. "Firepower"
3. "Grinder"
4. "Sinner"
5. "The Ripper"
6. "Lightning Strike"
7. "Bloodstone"
8. "Turbo Lover"
9. "Guardians" (Intro)
10. "Rising from Ruins"
11. "Freewheel Burning"
12. "You've Got Another Thing Comin'"
13. "Hell Bent for Leather"
14. "Painkiller"

Encore

1. "Metal Gods"
2. "Breaking the Law"
5 July 2018
1. "Firepower Intro"
2. "Firepower"
3. "Grinder"
4. "Sinner"
5. "The Ripper"
6. "Lightning Strike"
7. "Bloodstone"
8. "Saints in Hell"
9. "Turbo Lover"
10. "Prelude" (Intro)
11. "Tyrant"
12. "Freewheel Burning"
13. "Guardians" (Intro)
14. "Rising from Ruins"
15. "You've Got Another Thing Comin'"
16. "Hell Bent for Leather"
17. "Painkiller"

Encore

1. "Metal Gods"
2. "Breaking the Law"
3. "Living After Midnight"
4. "Victim of Changes"

19 July 2018 — 2 August 2018
1. "Firepower Intro"
2. "Firepower"
3. "Grinder"
4. "Sinner"
5. "The Ripper"
6. "Lightning Strike"
7. "Bloodstone"
8. "Saints in Hell"
9. "Turbo Lover"
10. "Prelude" (Intro)
11. "Tyrant"
12. "Night Comes Down"
13. "Freewheel Burning"
14. "Guardians" (Intro)
15. "Rising from Ruins"
16. "You've Got Another Thing Comin'"
17. "Hell Bent for Leather"
18. "Painkiller"

Encore

1. "Metal Gods"
2. "Breaking the Law"
3. "Living After Midnight"
3 August 2018
1. "Firepower Intro"
2. "Firepower"
3. "Grinder"
4. "Sinner"
5. "The Ripper"
6. "Lightning Strike"
7. "Bloodstone"
8. "Turbo Lover"
9. "Freewheel Burning"
10. "Guardians" (Intro)
11. "Rising from Ruins"
12. "You've Got Another Thing Comin'"
13. "Hell Bent for Leather"
14. "Painkiller"

Encore

1. "Metal Gods"
2. "Breaking the Law"
3. "Living After Midnight"

5 August 2018
1. "Firepower Intro"
2. "Firepower"
3. "Grinder"
4. "Sinner"
5. "Lightning Strike"
6. "Bloodstone"
7. "Turbo Lover"
8. "Guardians" (Intro)
9. "Rising from Ruins"
10. "Freewheel Burning"
11. "You've Got Another Thing Comin'"
12. "Hell Bent for Leather"
13. "Painkiller"

Encore

1. "Metal Gods"
2. "Breaking the Law"
3. "Living After Midnight"
6 August 2018
1. "Firepower Intro"
2. "Firepower"
3. "Grinder"
4. "Sinner"
5. "The Ripper"
6. "Lightning Strike"
7. "Bloodstone"
8. "Saints in Hell"
9. "Turbo Lover"
10. "Prelude" (Intro)
11. "Tyrant"
12. "Night Comes Down"
13. "Freewheel Burning"
14. "Guardians" (Intro)
15. "Rising from Ruins"
16. "You've Got Another Thing Comin'"
17. "Hell Bent for Leather"
18. "Painkiller"

Encore

1. "Metal Gods"
2. "Breaking the Law"
3. "No Surrender"
4. "Victim of Changes"
5. "Living After Midnight"

8 August 2018 — 10 August 2018
1. "Firepower Intro"
2. "Firepower"
3. "Grinder"
4. "Sinner"
5. "The Ripper"
6. "Lightning Strike"
7. "Bloodstone"
8. "Saints in Hell"
9. "Turbo Lover"
10. "Prelude" (Intro)
11. "Tyrant"
12. "Night Comes Down"
13. "Freewheel Burning"
14. "Guardians" (Intro)
15. "Rising from Ruins"
16. "You've Got Another Thing Comin'"
17. "Hell Bent for Leather"
18. "Painkiller"

Encore

1. "Metal Gods"
2. "Breaking the Law"
3. "No Surrender"
4. "Living After Midnight"

North America — Leg 2

21 August 2018 — 25 August 2018
1. "Firepower Intro"
2. "Firepower"
3. "Grinder"
4. "Sinner"
5. "Lightning Strike"
6. "Bloodstone"
7. "Turbo Lover"
8. "Guardians" (Intro)
9. "Rising from Ruins"
10. "Freewheel Burning"
11. "You've Got Another Thing Comin'"
12. "Hell Bent for Leather"
13. "Painkiller"

Encore

1. "Metal Gods"
2. "Breaking the Law"
3. "Living After Midnight"
27 August 2018
1. "Firepower Intro"
2. "Firepower"
3. "Grinder"
4. "Sinner"
5. "The Ripper"
6. "Lightning Strike"
7. "Bloodstone"
8. "Saints in Hell"
9. "Turbo Lover"
10. "Prelude" (Intro)
11. "Tyrant"
12. "Night Comes Down"
13. "Freewheel Burning"
14. "Guardians" (Intro)
15. "Rising from Ruins"
16. "You've Got Another Thing Comin'"
17. "Hell Bent for Leather"
18. "Painkiller"

Encore

1. "Metal Gods"
2. "Breaking the Law"
3. "No Surrender"
4. "Living After Midnight"

29 August 2018 — 2 September 2018
1. "Firepower Intro"
2. "Firepower"
3. "Delivering the Goods"
4. "Sinner"
5. "Lightning Strike"
6. "Desert Plains"
7. "Turbo Lover"
8. "Guardians" (Intro)
9. "Rising from Ruins"
10. "Freewheel Burning"
11. "You've Got Another Thing Comin'"
12. "Hell Bent for Leather"
13. "Painkiller"

Encore

1. "Metal Gods"
2. "Breaking the Law"
3. "No Surrender"
4. "Living After Midnight"
5 September 2018
1. "Firepower Intro"
2. "Firepower"
3. "Delivering the Goods"
4. "Sinner"
5. "Lightning Strike"
6. "Desert Plains"
7. "Turbo Lover"
8. "Guardians (Intro)
9. "Rising from Ruins"
10. "Freewheel Burning"
11. "You've Got Another Thing Comin'"
12. "Hell Bent for Leather"
13. "Painkiller"

Encore

1. "Metal Gods"
2. "Breaking the Law"
3. "Living After Midnight"

6 September 2018
1. "Firepower Intro"
2. "Firepower"
3. "Delivering the Goods"
4. "Sinner"
5. "Lightning Strike"
6. "Desert Plains"
7. "Turbo Lover"
8. "Guardians" (Intro)
9. "Rising from Ruins"
10. "Freewheel Burning"
11. "You've Got Another Thing Comin'"
12. "Hell Bent for Leather"
13. "Painkiller"

Encore

1. "Metal Gods"
2. "Breaking the Law"
3. "No Surrender"
4. "Living After Midnight"
8 September 2018
1. "Firepower Intro"
2. "Firepower"
3. "Delivering the Goods"
4. "Sinner"
5. "Lightning Strike"
6. "Desert Plains"
7. "Turbo Lover"
8. "Guardians" (Intro)
9. "Rising from Ruins"
10. "Freewheel Burning"
11. "You've Got Another Thing Comin'"
12. "Hell Bent for Leather"
13. "Painkiller"

Encore

1. "Metal Gods"
2. "Breaking the Law"
3. "Living After Midnight"

9 September 2018
1. "Firepower Intro"
2. "Firepower"
3. "Delivering the Goods"
4. "Sinner"
5. "Lightning Strike"
6. "Desert Plains"
7. "Turbo Lover"
8. "Guardians" (Intro)
9. "Rising from Ruins"
10. "No Surrender"
11. "Freewheel Burning"
12. "You've Got Another Thing Comin'"
13. "Hell Bent for Leather"
14. "Painkiller"

Encore

1. "Metal Gods"
2. "Breaking the Law"
3. "Living After Midnight"
11 September 2018
1. "Firepower Intro"
2. "Firepower"
3. "Delivering the Goods"
4. "Sinner"
5. "Lightning Strike"
6. "Desert Plains"
7. "Turbo Lover"
8. "Tyrant"
9. "Guardians" (Intro)
10. "Rising from Ruins"
11. "Freewheel Burning"
12. "You've Got Another Thing Comin'"
13. "Hell Bent for Leather"
14. "Painkiller"

Encore

1. "No Surrender"
2. "Breaking the Law"
3. "Living After Midnight"

12 September 2018 — 30 September 2018
1. "Firepower Intro"
2. "Firepower"
3. "Delivering the Goods"
4. "Sinner"
5. "Lightning Strike"
6. "Desert Plains"
7. "No Surrender"
8. "Turbo Lover"
9. "Guardians" (Intro)
10. "Rising from Ruins"
11. "Freewheel Burning"
12. "You've Got Another Thing Comin'"
13. "Hell Bent for Leather"
14. "Painkiller"

Encore

1. "The Hellion" (Intro)
2. "Electric Eye"
3. "Breaking the Law"
4. "Living After Midnight"

South America

26 October 2018 — 28 October 2018
1. "Firepower Intro"
2. "Firepower"
3. "Running Wild"
4. "Grinder"
5. "Sinner"
6. "The Ripper"
7. "Lightning Strike"
8. "Desert Plains"
9. "No Surrender"
10. "Turbo Lover"
11. "Prelude (Intro)
12. "Tyrant"
13. "Night Comes Down"
14. "Guardians (Intro)
15. "Rising from Ruins"
16. "Freewheel Burning"
17. "You've Got Another Thing Comin'"
18. "Hell Bent for Leather"
19. "Painkiller"

Encore

1. "The Hellion" (Intro)
2. "Electric Eye"
3. "Breaking the Law"
4. "Living After Midnight"
30 October 2018 — 14 November 2018
1. "Firepower Intro"
2. "Firepower"
3. "Running Wild"
4. "Grinder"
5. "Sinner"
6. "The Ripper"
7. "Lightning Strike"
8. "Desert Plains"
9. "No Surrender"
10. "Turbo Lover"
11. "The Green Manalishi (With the Two Prong Crown)"
12. "Night Comes Down"
13. "Guardians" (Intro)
14. "Rising from Ruins"
15. "Freewheel Burning"
16. "You've Got Another Thing Comin'"
17. "Hell Bent for Leather"
18. "Painkiller"

Encore

1. "The Hellion" (Intro)
2. "Electric Eye"
3. "Breaking the Law"
4. "Living After Midnight"

Asia — Leg 1

21 November 2018 — 7 December 2018
1. "Firepower Intro"
2. "Firepower"
3. "Running Wild"
4. "Grinder"
5. "Sinner"
6. "The Ripper"
7. "Lightning Strike"
8. "Desert Plains"
9. "No Surrender"
10. "Turbo Lover"
11. "The Green Manalishi (With the Two Prong Crown)"
12. "Night Comes Down"
13. "Guardians" (Intro)
14. "Rising from Ruins"
15. "Freewheel Burning"
16. "You've Got Another Thing Comin'"
17. "Hell Bent for Leather"
18. "Painkiller"

Encore

1. "The Hellion" (Intro)
2. "Electric Eye"
3. "Breaking the Law"
4. "Living After Midnight"

Europe — Leg 2

27 January 2019
1. "Firepower Intro"
2. "Firepower"
3. "Running Wild"
4. "Grinder"
5. "Sinner"
6. "The Ripper"
7. "Lightning Strike"
8. "Desert Plains"
9. "No Surrender"
10. "Turbo Lover"
11. "Killing Machine"
12. "The Green Manalishi (With the Two Prong Crown)"
13. "Night Comes Down"
14. "Guardians" (Intro)
15. "Rising from Ruins"
16. "Freewheel Burning"
17. "You've Got Another Thing Comin'"
18. "Hell Bent for Leather"
19. "Painkiller"

Encore

1. "The Hellion" (Intro)
2. "Electric Eye"
3. "Metal Gods"
4. "Breaking the Law"
5. "Living After Midnight"

Oceania

9 March 2019
1. "Firepower Intro"
2. "Firepower"
3. "Delivering the Goods"
4. "Grinder"
5. "Sinner"
6. "Lightning Strike"
7. "Desert Plains"
8. "No Surrender"
9. "Turbo Lover"
10. "Guardians" (Intro)
11. "Rising from Ruins"
12. "Freewheel Burning"
13. "You've Got Another Thing Comin'"
14. "Hell Bent for Leather"
15. "Painkiller"

Encore

1. "The Hellion" (Intro)
2. "Electric Eye"
3. "Breaking the Law"
11 March 2019
1. "Firepower Intro"
2. "Firepower"
3. "Running Wild"
4. "Sinner"
5. "Lightning Strike"
6. "Desert Plains"
7. "No Surrender"
8. "Turbo Lover"
9. "Guardians" (Intro)
10. "Rising from Ruins"
11. "Freewheel Burning"
12. "You've Got Another Thing Comin'"
13. "Hell Bent for Leather"
14. "Painkiller"

Encore

1. "The Hellion" (Intro)
2. "Electric Eye"
3. "Breaking the Law"

16 March 2019
1. "Firepower Intro"
2. "Firepower"
3. "Running Wild"
4. "Sinner"
5. "The Ripper"
6. "Lightning Strike"
7. "Desert Plains"
8. "No Surrender"
9. "Turbo Lover"
10. "The Green Manalishi (With the Two Prong Crown)"
11. "Night Comes Down"
12. "Guardians" (Intro)
13. "Rising from Ruins"
14. "Freewheel Burning"
15. "You've Got Another Thing Comin'"
16. "Hell Bent for Leather"
17. "Painkiller"

Encore

1. "The Hellion" (Intro)
2. "Electric Eye"
3. "Metal Gods"
4. "Breaking the Law"
5. "Living After Midnight"

Asia — Leg 2

21 March 2019
1. "Firepower Intro"
2. "Firepower"
3. "Delivering the Goods"
4. "Grinder"
5. "Sinner"
6. "The Ripper"
7. "Evil Never Dies"
8. "Bloodstone"
9. "Saints in Hell"
10. "No Surrender"
11. "Turbo Lover"
12. "Devil's Child"
13. "Killing Machine"
14. "Some Heads Are Gonna Roll"
15. "Guardians" (Intro)
16. "Rising from Ruins"
17. "Freewheel Burning"
18. "Rapid Fire"
19. "Hell Bent for Leather"
20. "Painkiller"

Encore

1. "The Hellion" (Intro)
2. "Electric Eye"
3. "Breaking the Law"
4. "Living After Midnight"

North America — Leg 3

3 May 2019
1. "Necromancer Intro"
2. "Necromancer"
3. "The Sentinel"
4. "Heading Out to the Highway"
5. "Spectre"
6. "(Take These) Chains"
7. "Judas Rising"
8. "Out in the Cold"
9. "Traitors Gate"
10. "Starbreaker"
11. "Steeler"
12. "Halls of Valhalla"
13. "Killing Machine"
14. "No Surrender"
15. "Victim of Changes"
16. "All Guns Blazing"

Encore

1. "Hell Bent for Leather"
2. "Breaking the Law"
3. "Living After Midnight"
4 May 2019
1. "Necromancer Intro"
2. "Necromancer"
3. "Heading Out to the Highway"
4. "The Sentinel"
5. "Judas Rising"
6. "Starbreaker"
7. "Out in the Cold"
8. "Steeler"
9. "Traitors Gate"
10. "All Guns Blazing"

Encore

1. "Hell Bent for Leather"
2. "Breaking the Law"
3. "Living After Midnight"

6 May 2019 — 14 May 2019
1. "Necromancer Intro"
2. "Necromancer"
3. "Heading Out to the Highway"
4. "The Sentinel"
5. "Spectre"
6. "(Take These) Chains"
7. "Judas Rising"
8. "Out in the Cold"
9. "Traitors Gate"
10. "Starbreaker"
11. "Steeler"
12. "Halls of Valhalla"
13. "Killing Machine"
14. "No Surrender"
15. "Victim of Changes"
16. "All Guns Blazing"

Encore

1. "Hell Bent for Leather"
2. "Breaking the Law"
3. "Living After Midnight"
15 May 2019
1. "Necromancer Intro"
2. "Necromancer"
3. "Heading Out to the Highway"
4. "The Sentinel"
5. "Spectre"
6. "(Take These) Chains"
7. "Prelude" (Intro)
8. "Tyrant"
9. "Judas Rising"
10. "Out in the Cold"
11. "Traitors Gate"
12. "Starbreaker"
13. "Devil's Child"
14. "Steeler"
15. "Halls of Valhalla"
16. "Killing Machine"
17. "No Surrender"
18. "Victim of Changes"
19. "All Guns Blazing"

Encore

1. "Hell Bent for Leather"
2. "Breaking the Law"
3. "Living After Midnight"

16 May 2019 — 18 May 2019
1. "Necromancer Intro"
2. "Necromancer"
3. "Heading Out to the Highway"
4. "The Sentinel"
5. "Spectre"
6. "(Take These) Chains"
7. "Judas Rising"
8. "Out in the Cold"
9. "Traitors Gate"
10. "Starbreaker"
11. "Steeler"
12. "Halls of Valhalla"
13. "Prelude" (Intro)
14. "Tyrant"
15. "No Surrender"
16. "Victim of Changes"
17. "All Guns Blazing"

Encore

1. "Hell Bent for Leather"
2. "Breaking the Law"
3. "Living After Midnight"
19 May 2019
1. "Necromancer Intro"
2. "Necromancer"
3. "Heading Out to the Highway"
4. "The Sentinel"
5. "Spectre"
6. "(Take These) Chains"
7. "Judas Rising"
8. "Out in the Cold"
9. "Traitors Gate"
10. "Starbreaker"
11. "Steeler"
12. "Halls of Valhalla"
13. "Prelude" (Intro)
14. "Tyrant"
15. "No Surrender"
16. "Hot Rockin'"
17. "Victim of Changes"
18. "All Guns Blazing"

Encore

1. "Hell Bent for Leather"
2. "Breaking the Law"
3. "Living After Midnight"

22 May 2019
1. "Necromancer Intro"
2. "Necromancer"
3. "Heading Out to the Highway"
4. "The Sentinel"
5. "Spectre"
6. "(Take These) Chains"
7. "Judas Rising"
8. "Out in the Cold"
9. "Traitors Gate"
10. "Starbreaker"
11. "Steeler"
12. "Halls of Valhalla"
13. "Prelude" (Intro)
14. "Tyrant"
15. "No Surrender"
16. "Victim of Changes"
17. "All Guns Blazing"

Encore

1. "Hell Bent for Leather"
2. "Breaking the Law"
3. "Living After Midnight"
23 May 2019
1. "Necromancer Intro"
2. "Necromancer"
3. "Heading Out to the Highway"
4. "The Sentinel"
5. "Spectre"
6. "(Take These) Chains"
7. "Judas Rising"
8. "Out in the Cold"
9. "Traitors Gate"
10. "Starbreaker"
11. "Steeler"
12. "Halls of Valhalla"
13. "Prelude" (Intro)
14. "Tyrant"
15. "No Surrender"
16. "The Green Manalishi (With the Two Prong Crown)"
17. "Victim of Changes"
18. "All Guns Blazing"

Encore

1. "Hell Bent for Leather"
2. "Breaking the Law"
3. "Living After Midnight"

25 May 2019 — 24 June 2019
1. "Necromancer Intro"
2. "Necromancer"
3. "Heading Out to the Highway"
4. "The Sentinel"
5. "Spectre"
6. "(Take These) Chains"
7. "Judas Rising"
8. "Out in the Cold"
9. "Traitors Gate"
10. "Starbreaker"
11. "Steeler"
12. "Halls of Valhalla"
13. "Prelude" (Intro)
14. "Tyrant"
15. "No Surrender"
16. "Victim of Changes"
17. "All Guns Blazing"

Encore

1. "Hell Bent for Leather"
2. "Breaking the Law"
3. "Living After Midnight"
25 June 2019 — 29 June 2019
1. "Necromancer Intro"
2. "Necromancer"
3. "Heading Out to the Highway"
4. "The Sentinel"
5. "Spectre"
6. "(Take These) Chains"
7. "Judas Rising"
8. "Out in the Cold"
9. "Traitors Gate"
10. "Starbreaker"
11. "Steeler"
12. "Halls of Valhalla"
13. "Prelude" (Intro)
14. "Tyrant"
15. "No Surrender"
16. "Hot Rockin'"
17. "Victim of Changes"
18. "All Guns Blazing"

Encore

1. "Hell Bent for Leather"
2. "Breaking the Law"
3. "Living After Midnight"

== Tour dates ==
Date	City	Country	Venue
North America #1
13 March 2018	Wilkes-Barre	United States	Mohegan Sun Arena at Casey Plaza
15 March 2018	Youngstown	United States	Covelli Centre
17 March 2018	Uniondale	United States	Nassau Veterans Memorial Coliseum
18 March 2018	Washington, D.C.	United States	The Anthem
20 March 2018	Newark	United States	Prudential Center
22 March 2018	Uncasville	United States	Mohegan Sun Arena
23 March 2018	Worcester	United States	Worcester Palladium
25 March 2018	Ottawa	Canada	TD Place Arena
27 March 2018	London	Canada	Budweiser Gardens
28 March 2018	Oshawa	Canada	Tribute Communities Centre
30 March 2018	Orillia	Canada	Casino Rama
31 March 2018	Detroit	United States	Masonic Temple
2 April 2018	Minneapolis	United States	Minneapolis Armory
3 April 2018	Milwaukee	United States	Riverside Theater
5 April 2018	Green Bay	United States	Resch Center
6 April 2018	Hammond	United States	Horseshoe Hammond
8 April 2018	Bloomington	United States	Grossinger Motors Arena
10 April 2018	Casper	United States	Casper Events Center
11 April 2018	Loveland	United States	Budweiser Events Center
13 April 2018	Salt Lake City	United States	Vivint Smart Home Arena
15 April 2018	Kent	United States	ShoWare Center
17 April 2018	Portland	United States	Veterans Memorial Coliseum
19 April 2018	San Francisco	United States	The Warfield Theatre
21 April 2018	Las Vegas	United States	Las Rageous Festival
22 April 2018	Los Angeles	United States	Microsoft Theater
24 April 2018	Phoenix	United States	Comerica Theatre
26 April 2018	Tulsa	United States	BOK Center
28 April 2018	Dallas	United States	The Bomb Factory
29 April 2018	Sugar Land	United States	Smart Financial Centre at Sugar Land
1 May 2018	San Antonio	United States	Freeman Coliseum
5 May 2018	Mexico City	Mexico	Hell & Heaven Metal Fest
Europe #1
5 June 2018	Oslo	Norway	Oslo Spektrum
7 June 2018	Hyvinkää	Finland	Rockfest
9 June 2018	Sölvesborg	Sweden	Sweden Rock Festival
10 June 2018	Copenhagen	Denmark	Royal Arena
12 June 2018	Plzeň	Czech Republic	Home Monitoring Aréna
13 June 2018	Katowice	Poland	Spodek
15 June 2018	Gräfenhainichen	Germany	With Full Force
17 June 2018	Florence	Italy	Firenze Rocks
19 June 2018	Freiburg im Breisgau	Germany	Messe Freiburg
20 June 2018	Mannheim	Germany	Zeltfestival im Maimarktgelände
22 June 2018	Clisson	France	Hellfest
24 June 2018	Dessel	Belgium	Graspop Metal Meeting
26 June 2018	Zürich	Switzerland	Samsung Hall
28 June 2018	Bilbao	Spain	Sala Cubec
30 June 2018	Madrid	Spain	Download Festival
2 July 2018	Lisbon	Portugal	Altice Arena
5 July 2018	Barcelona	Spain	Barcelona Rock Fest
19 July 2018	Athens	Greece	Rockwave Festival
21 July 2018	Plovdiv	Bulgaria	Hills of Rock Festival
22 July 2018	Bucharest	Romania	Romexpo
24 July 2018	Budapest	Hungary	Budapest Sports Arena
26 July 2018	Tolmin	Slovenia	Metaldays
28 July 2018	Vienna	Austria	Wiener Stadthalle
31 July 2018	Munich	Germany	Zenith
2 August 2018	Wacken	Germany	Wacken Open Air
3 August 2018	Kostrzyn nad Odrą	Poland	Pol'and'Rock Festival
5 August 2018	Lokeren	Belgium	Lokerse Feesten
6 August 2018	Tilburg	Netherlands	013
8 August 2018	Dortmund	Germany	Westfalenhalle
10 August 2018	Walton-on-Trent	England	Bloodstock Open Air
North America #2
21 August 2018	Cincinnati	United States	Riverbend Music Center
22 August 2018	Chicago	United States	Hollywood Casino Amphitheatre
24 August 2018	Sterling Heights	United States	Michigan Lottery Amphitheatre at Freedom Hill
25 August 2018	Mount Pleasant	United States	Soaring Eagle Casino & Resort
27 August 2018	Hamilton	Canada	FirstOntario Centre
29 August 2018	Montréal	Canada	Bell Centre
30 August 2018	Québec City	Canada	Videotron Centre
1 September 2018	Wantagh	United States	Northwell Health at Jones Beach Theater
2 September 2018	Bethel	United States	Bethel Woods Center for the Arts
5 September 2018	Darien	United States	Darien Lake Performing Arts Center
6 September 2018	Holmdel	United States	PNC Bank Arts Center
8 September 2018	Virginia Beach	United States	Veterans United Home Loans Amphitheater at Virginia Beach
9 September 2018	Camden	United States	BB&T Pavilion
11 September 2018	Charlotte	United States	PNC Music Pavilion
12 September 2018	Jacksonville	United States	Daily's Place
14 September 2018	Atlanta	United States	Verizon Wireless Amphitheatre at Encore Park
16 September 2018	Biloxi	United States	Mississippi Coast Coliseum
18 September 2018	Kansas City	United States	Starlight Theatre
20 September 2018	Welch	United States	Treasure Island Hotel and Casino
21 September 2018	Council Bluffs	United States	Harrah's Council Bluffs
23 September 2018	Denver	United States	Pepsi Center
26 September 2018	Chula Vista	United States	North Island Credit Union Amphitheatre
27 September 2018	Irvine	United States	FivePoint Amphitheatre
29 September 2018	Mountain View	United States	Shoreline Amphitheatre
30 September 2018	Wheatland	United States	Toyota Amphitheatre
South America
26 October 2018	Bogotá	Colombia	Hipódromo de Los Andes
28 October 2018	Quito	Ecuador	Coliseo General Rumiñahui
30 October 2018	Lima	Peru	Jockey Club del Perú
2 November 2018	Santiago	Chile	Movistar Arena
4 November 2018	Buenos Aires	Argentina	Tecnópolis
8 November 2018	Curitiba	Brazil	Pedreira Paulo Leminski
10 November 2018	São Paulo	Brazil	Allianz Parque
11 November 2018	Rio de Janeiro	Brazil	KM de Vantagens Hall
14 November 2018	Belo Horizonte	Brazil	KM de Vantagens Hall
Asia #1
21 November 2018	Sapporo	Japan	Zepp Sapporo
23 November 2018	Tajimi	Japan	Valor Culture Hall
25 November 2018	Okayama	Japan	Okayama Civic Hall
26 November 2018	Osaka	Japan	Grand Cube Osaka
28 November 2018	Tokyo	Japan	Tokyo Dome City Hall
29 November 2018	Tokyo	Japan	Musashino Forest Sport Plaza
1 December 2018	Seoul	South Korea	Bluesquare Hall
4 December 2018	Singapore	Singapore	Zepp@Bigbox
7 December 2018	Jakarta	Indonesia	Ecopark Ancol
Europe #2
27 January 2019	Paris	France	Zénith Paris
Oceania
9 March 2019	Sydney	Australia	Download Festival Australia
11 March 2019	Melbourne	Australia	Download Festival Australia
16 March 2019	Auckland	New Zealand	Spark Arena
Asia #2
21 March 2019	Tokyo	Japan	Download Festival Japan
North America #3
3 May 2019	Hollywood	United States	Seminole Hard Rock Hotel & Casino Hollywood
4 May 2019	Jacksonville	United States	Rockville Festival
6 May 2019	Nashville	United States	Nashville Municipal Auditorium
8 May 2019	Atlanta	United States	Fox Theatre
9 May 2019	Biloxi	United States	Beau Rivage
12 May 2019	Washington, D.C.	United States	The Anthem
14 May 2019	Huntington	United States	The Paramount
15 May 2019	Huntington	United States	The Paramount
16 May 2019	Uncasville	United States	Mohegan Sun Arena
18 May 2019	Albany	United States	Palace Theatre
19 May 2019	Albany	United States	Palace Theatre
22 May 2019	Milwaukee	United States	Riverside Theater
23 May 2019	Milwaukee	United States	Riverside Theater
25 May 2019	Rosemont	United States	Rosemont Theatre
28 May 2019	Austin	United States	ACL Live at The Moody Theater
29 May 2019	Austin	United States	ACL Live at The Moody Theater
31 May 2019	Dallas	United States	The Bomb Factory
1 June 2019	Little Rock	United States	First Security Amphitheater
3 June 2019	St. Louis	United States	Stifel Theatre
8 June 2019	Saskatoon	Canada	SaskTel Centre
10 June 2019	Lethbridge	Canada	ENMAX Centre
11 June 2019	Edmonton	Canada	Rogers Place
13 June 2019	Dawson Creek	Canada	EnCana Events Centre
14 June 2019	Prince George	Canada	CN Centre
16 June 2019	Kelowna	Canada	Prospera Place
17 June 2019	Abbottsford	Canada	Abbotsford Centre
19 June 2019	Airway Heights	United States	Northern Quest Resort & Casino
21 June 2019	Kent	United States	ShoWare Center
22 June 2019	Portland	United States	Moda Center
24 June 2019	San Francisco	United States	The Warfield Theatre
25 June 2019	San Francisco	United States	The Warfield Theatre
27 June 2019	Los Angeles	United States	Microsoft Theater
28 June 2019	Ontario	United States	Toyota Arena
29 June 2019	Las Vegas	United States	Hard Rock Hotel and Casino

Cancelled dates

24 January 2019	Reykjavík	Iceland
30 January 2020 — 3 March 2020
13 March 2019	Christchurch	New Zealand
20 March 2019	Cape Town	South Africa
22 March 2019	Johannesburg	South Africa
11 May 2019	Rockingham	Epicenter
5 June 2019	Colorado Springs	Broadmoor World Arena

== Box office score data ==
As of 16 May 2019

Venue	City	Tickets sold / available	Gross revenue
Nassau Coliseum	Uniondale	5,331 / 5,549	$448,814
The Anthem	Washington	6,000 / 6,000	$331,220
Prudential Center	Newark	5,433 / 6,669	$401,780
Mohegan Sun Arena (2018)	Uncasville	6,198 / 6,267	$360,923
Budweiser Gardens	London, Canada	3,780 / 3,780	$243,277
Tribute Communities Centre	Oshawa	3,161 / 3,906	$194,078
Resch Center	Green Bay	3,352 / 6,339	$225,248
Casper Events Center	Casper	1,923 / 4,277	$110,004
Microsoft Theater	Los Angeles	6,954 / 6,954	$555,668
BOK Center	Tulsa	4,473 / 5,643	$290,422
KM de Vantagens Hall	Rio de Janeiro	3,839 / 8,432	$196,802
Mohegan Sun Arena (2019)	Uncasville	5,672 / 6,299	$362,823
TOTAL		56,071 / 70,115 (79.97%)	$3,721,059
