= Turbo (Judas Priest album) =

- Cover art by Doug Johnson

Studio album by Judas Priest
- Released: 7 April 1986
- Studios: Compass Point, Nassau, Bahamas Record Plant, Los Angeles
- Genres: Glam metal; heavy metal
- Length: 40:58
- Label: Columbia
- Producer: Tom Allom

Judas Priest chronology
Defenders of the Faith (1984)	Turbo (1986)	Priest...Live! (1987)

Singles from Turbo
- 1. "Turbo Lover" Released: 7 April 1986; 2. "Locked In" Released: 19 May 1986; 3. "Parental Guidance" Released: 7 August 1986

Turbo is the tenth studio album by English heavy metal band Judas Priest, released in the UK on 7 April 1986 by Columbia Records. The album is notable for the band's change to a commercial glam metal sound, that had them using synthesisers for the first time.

A remastered CD was released in 2001, including two bonus tracks. On 3 February 2017, the album was reissued as Turbo 30 for its 30th anniversary, including two CDs of a live performance at Kemper Arena in Kansas City, Missouri, on 22 May 1986.

== Overview ==
Following the success of their previous album, Defenders of the Faith, Judas Priest initially recorded a double album which was intended to be released under the title Twin Turbos, half of which would be more commercial and the other half would be aggressive heavy metal. This idea was scrapped. Instead, the material was split up, with the more commercial songs appearing as the album Turbo. The lyrical content on Turbo was markedly different from previous Judas Priest albums, with more emphasis on grounded subjects such as love and romance rather than the band's usual sci-fi and fantasy themes. On the whole, it was a response to the changed music scene of the mid-1980s which was becoming focused more on light, synth-driven pop rather than the driving hard rock of the 1970s to early 1980s.

After concluding the Metal Conqueror World Tour at the end of 1984, the band took their first-ever extended hiatus and did not perform at all during 1985 except for an appearance at the Live Aid Concert where only three songs were played. Work began on Turbo that summer and finished late in the year. During this time, singer Rob Halford struggled with increasing substance abuse and violent feuds with his romantic partner. After his partner died by suicide, Halford resolved to get clean and entered rehab, where he spent a month from December 1985 to January 1986.

Upon its release in April 1986, Turbo was a commercial success. The album was certified Gold by the RIAA on 10 June 1986 and Platinum on 24 July 1989. The album reached No. 33 on the UK Albums Chart and No. 17 on the Billboard 200, marking the apex of Priest's commercial success and being the band's highest chart position until 2005's Angel of Retribution. The music videos supporting "Turbo Lover" and "Locked In" enjoyed heavy rotation on MTV, furthering the success of the album commercially.

The cover was once again done by graphic artist Doug Johnson, who designed the Screaming for Vengeance and Defenders of the Faith covers.

"Reckless" was asked to be on the soundtrack of the movie Top Gun, but Judas Priest declined, both because they thought the film would flop and because it would have meant leaving the song off Turbo. However, their next album, Ram It Down, contained a cover of "Johnny B. Goode" that was featured in the soundtrack for the movie of the same title. "Reckless" and "Wild Nights, Hot & Crazy Days" were also Judas Priest's first songs to be played lower than E tuning, instead being tuned a half-step down to E♭ standard tuning.

"Parental Guidance" was allegedly written as a response to Tipper Gore's attack on the band, and heavy metal in general, in the mid-1980s. Her organization, the Parents Music Resource Center (PMRC), had placed the band's song "Eat Me Alive" (from Defenders of the Faith) at No. 3 on their list of offensive songs, referred to as the "Filthy 15". The PMRC alleged that the song was obscene because it encouraged the performance of oral sex at gunpoint.

== Reception ==
Professional ratings
Review scores
Source	Rating
AllMusic	2.5/5 stars
Metal Hammer (GER)	6/7
PopMatters	(mixed)
Martin Popoff	6/10

Turbo sold well initially, and was certified Gold by the RIAA on 10 June 1986 and Platinum on 24 July 1987. It reached No. 33 in the UK and No. 17 on Billboard 200, the band's highest chart position until 2005's Angel of Retribution. The album would be Priest's final platinum-selling album. Sales tapered off and the subsequent live album from the otherwise successful Fuel for Life tour did not sell as well, only going Gold after a string of Platinum certified albums.

Seven of the album's nine songs were performed during the Fuel for Life tour with "Hot for Love" being the least played of those. The title track has remained in the band's set lists since then and "Out in the Cold" reappeared in 2019. During the tour, the band also dispensed with the black leather and studs look they'd sported since 1978 and went for a slightly more colourful "glam" leather wardrobe. A number of older songs such as "Sinner" and "The Ripper" were also dropped from the live setlist, leading K. K. Downing to remark "People ask why we don't play Sinner anymore. I tell them it's because we've all repented."

Rob Halford referred to Turbo as the "love/hate Judas Priest album". In 2008 he told Kerrang!:

The only agenda we've ever had in Priest was to really give every album its own life and I think we've achieved that on everything from Rocka Rolla up to the new one, Nostradamus. That said, if ever there was a controversial record in terms of what people might have expected from us, it's Turbo. It was the fact that we moved into a different atmosphere, but that's where we were at that particular time. Some of the technological advances like the pedal boards that Glenn and KK used were giving us options for different sounds and experimentation. Personally I think there are still some great tracks on that album ... It's one of the recordings that divide opinion.

Despite Turbo's achievement and reception, Downing said that "it wasn't the big-selling album that we hoped for. I think quite a lot of that went on with the acceptability and success of a lot of other bands that you would look at on MTV. Even Ozzy went to the hairdressers." In his 2020 memoir Confess, Halford admitted that he now sees his lyrics on Turbo as subpar, stating that his alcohol and substance abuse at the time had started to take their toll on his writing process.

== Track listing ==
All tracks are written by K. K. Downing, Glenn Tipton and Rob Halford.

Side one
No.	Title	Length
1.	"Turbo Lover"	5:33
2.	"Locked In"	4:19
3.	"Private Property"	4:29
4.	"Parental Guidance"	3:25
5.	"Rock You All Around the World"	3:37

Side two
No.	Title	Length
6.	"Out in the Cold"	6:27
7.	"Wild Nights, Hot & Crazy Days"	4:39
8.	"Hot for Love"	4:12
9.	"Reckless"	4:17
Total length:		40:58

2001 CD edition bonus tracks
No.	Title	Length
10.	"All Fired Up" (Recorded during the 1985 Turbo sessions)	4:45
11.	"Locked In" (Live at Kiel Auditorium, St. Louis, Missouri; 23 May 1986)	4:24
Total length:		50:07

Songs left over from Twin Turbos
No.	Title	Album on which they later appeared	Length
1.	"All Fired Up"	Turbo reissue	4:45
2.	"Red, White & Blue"	British Steel reissue	3:42
3.	"Prisoner of Your Eyes"	Screaming for Vengeance reissue	7:12
4.	"Turn on Your Light"	Defenders of the Faith reissue	5:23
5.	"Ram It Down"	Ram It Down	4:48
6.	"Hard as Iron"	Ram It Down	4:09
7.	"Love You to Death"	Ram It Down	4:36
8.	"Monsters of Rock"	Ram It Down	5:30
9.	"Heart of a Lion"	Metalogy	3:53
10.	"Under the Gun"	Unreleased
11.	"Fighting for Your Love"	Unreleased

30th Anniversary Edition – bonus live CDs

Disc one
No.	Title	Length
1.	"Out in the Cold"	6:35
2.	"Locked In"	4:21
3.	"Heading Out to the Highway"	4:53
4.	"Metal Gods"	4:03
5.	"Breaking the Law"	2:43
6.	"Love Bites"	5:19
7.	"Some Heads Are Gonna Roll"	4:25
8.	"The Sentinel"	5:02
9.	"Private Property"	5:11
10.	"Desert Plains"	4:55
11.	"Rock You All Around the World"	5:02

Disc two
No.	Title	Length
1.	"The Hellion"	0:40
2.	"Electric Eye"	3:37
3.	"Turbo Lover"	6:03
4.	"Freewheel Burning"	5:03
5.	"Victim of Changes"	8:55
6.	"The Green Manalishi (With the Two Prong Crown)" (Fleetwood Mac cover)	5:19
7.	"Living After Midnight"	4:35
8.	"You've Got Another Thing Comin'"	9:01
9.	"Hell Bent for Leather"	5:53

== Personnel ==
Judas Priest

- Rob Halford – vocals
- K. K. Downing – guitars, guitar synthesiser
- Glenn Tipton – guitars, guitar synthesiser
- Ian Hill – bass
- Dave Holland – drums

Additional Musician

- Jeff Martin – backing vocals on "Wild Nights, Hot & Crazy Days"

Lead Guitar Credits

- Turbo Lover – Glenn Tipton
- Locked In – KK Downing, Tipton, Downing, Tipton, underlying melody – Downing, arpeggios and run – Tipton
- Private Property – Tipton
- Parental Guidance – first half – Tipton, second half – Downing
- Rock You All Around The World – Tipton
- Out in the Cold – intro – Tipton, solo first half – Downing, solo second half – Tipton
- Wild Nights, Hot and Crazy Days – Downing
- Hot For Love – Downing, harmony section – both
- Reckless – intro – both, solo – Tipton, licks – Downing

Production (Original)

- Produced by Tom Allom
- Recorded at Compass Point Studios, Nassau, IN
- Engineered by Bill Dooley, assisted by Paul Wertheimer and Sean Burrows
- Mixed by Glenn Tipton, K. K. Downing, Tom Allom, and Bill Dooley at The Record Plant
- Equipment surveillance by Tom Calcaterra
- Mastered by Bernie Grundman
- Cover design by Doug Johnson

Production (2001 Remaster)

- Remastered by Jon Astley
- Remastering co-ordinator by Jayne Andrews

Production (30th Anniversary Remaster)

- Remastered by Mandy Parnell at Black Saloon Studios
- Revised artwork by Mark Wilkinson
- Photography by Ross Halfin, Mark Weiss, and Neil Zlozower

Production (30th Anniversary Remaster Bonus Live CDs)

- Recorded at Sandstone Amphitheatre, Bonner Springs, KS on 22 May 1986
- Mixed by Tom Allom and Jack Rushton
- Mastered by Mandy Parnell at Black Saloon Studios

== Charts ==
Chart (1986)	Peak position
Australian Albums (Kent Music Report)	56
Canada Top Albums/CDs (RPM)	37
Dutch Albums (Album Top 100)	57
Finnish Albums (The Official Finnish Charts)	11
German Albums (Offizielle Top 100)	28
Japanese Albums (Oricon)	22
Norwegian Albums (VG-lista)	13
Swedish Albums (Sverigetopplistan)	10
Swiss Albums (Schweizer Hitparade)	26
UK Albums (Official Charts)	33
US Billboard 200	17

Chart (2017)	Peak position
Austrian Albums (Ö3 Austria)	51
Belgian Albums (Ultratop Wallonia)	76
Belgian Albums (Ultratop Flanders)	108
French Albums (SNEP)	162
Scottish Albums (Official Charts)	78
Spanish Albums (Promusicae)	73
UK Rock & Metal Albums (Official Charts)	7

== Certifications ==
Region	Certification	Certified units/sales
Canada (Music Canada)	Platinum	100,000^{^}
United States (RIAA)	Platinum	1,000,000^{^}
^{^} Shipments figures based on certification alone.
