= World Vengeance Tour =

1982–83 concert tour by Judas Priest

- Tour by Judas Priest
- Tour concert poster
- Location: North America
- Associated album: Screaming for Vengeance
- Start date: 26 August 1982
- End date: 21 February 1983
- Legs: 1
- No. of shows: 111

Judas Priest concert chronology
- World Wide Blitz Tour (1981); World Vengeance Tour (1982–1983); Metal Conqueror Tour (1984)

The World Vengeance Tour was a 1982 concert tour by English heavy metal band Judas Priest where they toured throughout North America from 26 August 1982 until 21 February 1983 in support of the 1982 album Screaming for Vengeance.

== Overview ==
The 12 December 1982 show was filmed and released on multiple video formats; first released on VHS, Beta, VHD and LaserDisc as Judas Priest Live in 1983; as Disc 5 as a DVD on the Metalogy compilation box-set in 2004; and as a separate DVD package entitled Live Vengeance '82 in 2006.

Despite the last US leg of the tour ended in Honolulu on 21 February 1983, the band would perform their last show of the tour at the 1983 US Festival in San Bernardino, California on 29 May 1983 alongside Quiet Riot, Mötley Crüe, Ozzy Osbourne, Triumph, the Scorpions, and Van Halen. The band's performance is featured as a DVD on the 30th anniversary edition of Screaming for Vengeance.

== Personnel ==
- Rob Halford – lead vocals
- Glenn Tipton – lead/rhythm guitar and background vocals
- K.K. Downing – rhythm/lead guitar and background vocals
- Ian Hill – bass
- Dave Holland – drums and background vocals

== Setlist ==
1. "Electric Eye"
2. "Riding On The Wind"
3. "Heading Out to the Highway"
4. "Metal Gods"
5. "Bloodstone"
6. "Breaking the Law"
7. "Sinner"
8. "Fever" (dropped after 28 August 1982)
9. "Desert Plains"
10. "The Ripper"
11. "Diamonds & Rust" (Joan Baez cover)
12. "Devil's Child"
13. "Screaming for Vengeance"
14. "You've Got Another Thing Comin'"
15. "Victim of Changes"
16. "Living After Midnight"
17. "The Green Manalishi (With the Two Prong Crown)" (Fleetwood Mac cover)
18. "Hell Bent for Leather"

Also occasionally played were:

- "Tyrant" (played on 29 August 1982 and 9 January 1983)
- "Hot Rockin'" (played on 28 October 1982)
- "Genocide" (played on 28 October 1982)

== Tour dates ==
Date	City	Country	Venue
North American leg
26 August 1982 ^{[A]}	Bethlehem	United States	Stabler Arena
28 August 1982 ^{[A]}	East Troy	United States	Alpine Valley Music Theater
29 August 1982 ^{[A]}	Springfield	United States	Prairie Capital Convention Center
31 August 1982 ^{[B]}	Amarillo	United States	Amarillo Civic Center
2 September 1982 ^{[B]}	Lubbock	United States	Lubbock Municipal Coliseum
3 September 1982 ^{[B]}	El Paso	United States	El Paso County Coliseum
4 September 1982 ^{[B]}	Odessa	United States	Ector County Coliseum
6 September 1982 ^{[B]}	Lake Charles	United States	Sudduth Coliseum
7 September 1982 ^{[B]}	Houston	United States	Sam Houston Coliseum
9 September 1982 ^{[B]}	Corpus Christi	United States	Memorial Coliseum
10 September 1982 ^{[B]}	San Antonio	United States	San Antonio Convention Center
11 September 1982 ^{[B]}	Dallas	United States	Reunion Arena
12 September 1982 ^{[B]}	Norman	United States	Lloyd Noble Center
14 September 1982 ^{[C]}	St. Louis	United States	The Checkerdome
15 September 1982 ^{[C]}	Kansas City	United States	Kansas City Municipal Auditorium
16 September 1982 ^{[C]}	Lincoln	United States	Pershing Center
17 September 1982 ^{[C]}	Bloomington	United States	Met Center
19 September 1982 ^{[C]}	Rockford	United States	Rockford Metro Center
21 September 1982 ^{[C]}	Chicago	United States	International Amphitheatre
22 September 1982 ^{[C]}	Richfield	United States	Richfield Coliseum
23 September 1982 ^{[C]}	Trotwood	United States	Hara Arena
24 September 1982 ^{[C]}	Toledo	United States	Toledo Sports Arena
25 September 1982 ^{[C]}	Detroit	United States	Cobo Arena
26 September 1982 ^{[C]}	Kalamazoo	United States	Wings Stadium
28 September 1982 ^{[C]}	Huntington	United States	Huntington Civic Center
29 September 1982 ^{[C]}	Columbus	United States	Ohio Center
1 October 1982 ^{[C]}	Worcester	United States	The Centrum
2 October 1982 ^{[C]}	New York City	United States	Madison Square Garden
3 October 1982 ^{[C]}	Harrisburg	United States	City Island
6 October 1982 ^{[C]}	Portland	United States	Cumberland County Civic Center
7 October 1982 ^{[C]}	Providence	United States	Providence Civic Center
8 October 1982 ^{[C]}	Glens Falls	United States	Glens Falls Civic Center
9 October 1982 ^{[C]}	New Haven	United States	New Haven Coliseum
11 October 1982 ^{[C]}	Binghamton	United States	Broome County Veterans Memorial Arena
12 October 1982 ^{[C]}	Philadelphia	United States	Spectrum
13 October 1982 ^{[C]}	Pittsburgh	United States	Pittsburgh Civic Arena
15 October 1982 ^{[C]}	Buffalo	United States	Buffalo Memorial Auditorium
16 October 1982 ^{[C]}	Syracuse	United States	Onondaga County War Memorial Arena
18 October 1982 ^{[C]}	Landover	United States	Capital Centre
19 October 1982 ^{[C]}	Baltimore	United States	Baltimore Civic Center
20 October 1982 ^{[C]}	Salisbury	United States	Wicomico Youth and Civic Center
21 October 1982 ^{[C]}	Norfolk	United States	Norfolk Scope
22 October 1982 ^{[C]}	East Rutherford	United States	Meadowlands Arena
23 October 1982 ^{[C]}	Rochester	United States	Rochester Community War Memorial
25 October 1982	Quebec City	Canada	Colisée de Québec
26 October 1982	Montreal	Canada	Verdun Auditorium
28 October 1982	Toronto	Canada	Maple Leaf Gardens
31 October 1982	Arlington Heights	United States	Arlington Park
4 November 1982	Winnipeg	Canada	Winnipeg Arena
6 November 1982	Edmonton	Canada	Northlands Coliseum
7 November 1982	Calgary	Canada	Max Bell Centre
9 November 1982	Vancouver	Canada	Pacific Coliseum
10 November 1982	Portland	United States	Veterans Memorial Coliseum
11 November 1982	Portland	United States	Veterans Memorial Coliseum
12 November 1982	Spokane	United States	Spokane Coliseum
13 November 1982	Eugene	United States	Lane County Exhibition Hall
15 November 1982	Seattle	United States	Seattle Center Coliseum
16 November 1982	Seattle	United States	Seattle Center Coliseum
17 November 1982	Reno	United States	Reno Centennial Coliseum
18 November 1982	Fresno	United States	Selland Arena
19 November 1982 ^{[F]}	Daly City	United States	Cow Palace
21 November 1982	Long Beach	United States	Long Beach Arena
22 November 1982	Long Beach	United States	Long Beach Arena
23 November 1982	Phoenix	United States	Arizona Veterans Memorial Coliseum
24 November 1982	Tucson	United States	Tucson Community Center
26 November 1982	Las Vegas	United States	Aladdin Theater
27 November 1982	San Diego	United States	San Diego Sports Arena
29 November 1982	Salt Lake City	United States	Salt Palace
1 December 1982	Albuquerque	United States	Tingley Coliseum
2 December 1982	Denver	United States	McNichols Sports Arena
5 December 1982	Cincinnati	United States	Cincinnati Gardens
6 December 1982	Nashville	United States	Nashville Municipal Auditorium
8 December 1982	Jacksonville	United States	Jacksonville Coliseum
9 December 1982	Sunrise	United States	Sunrise Musical Theater
11 December 1982	Atlanta	United States	Omni Coliseum
12 December 1982	Memphis	United States	Mid-South Coliseum
14 December 1982	Indianapolis	United States	Market Square Arena
15 December 1982	Evansville	United States	Roberts Municipal Stadium
4 January 1983	Fort Wayne	United States	Allen County War Memorial Coliseum
5 January 1983	Louisville	United States	Louisville Gardens
7 January 1983	Hampton	United States	Hampton Coliseum
8 January 1983	Fayetteville	United States	Cumberland County Memorial Arena
9 January 1983	Greenville	United States	Greenville Memorial Auditorium
11 January 1983	Augusta	United States	Augusta Civic Center
12 January 1983	Charlotte	United States	Charlotte Coliseum
14 January 1983	Knoxville	United States	Knoxville Civic Coliseum
15 January 1983	Johnson City	United States	Freedom Hall Civic Center
16 January 1983	Greensboro	United States	Greensboro Coliseum
18 January 1983	Erie	United States	Erie County Field House
20 January 1983	Toledo	United States	Toledo Sports Arena
21 January 1983	Milwaukee	United States	Mecca Arena
22 January 1983	Madison	United States	Dane County Coliseum
24 January 1983	Lansing	United States	Lansing Civic Center
25 January 1983	Saginaw	United States	Wendler Arena
26 January 1983	Muskegon	United States	L.C. Walker Arena
27 January 1983	Terre Haute	United States	Hulman Center
29 January 1983	La Crosse	United States	La Crosse Center
30 January 1983	Duluth	United States	Duluth Entertainment Convention Center
2 February 1983	Des Moines	United States	Veterans Memorial Auditorium
3 February 1983	Lincoln	United States	Pershing Center
4 February 1983	Salina	United States	Bicentennial Center
5 February 1983	Springfield	United States	Hammons Center
6 February 1983	Little Rock	United States	Barton Coliseum
8 February 1983(F)	Shreveport	United States	Hirsch Memorial Coliseum
9 February 1983	Birmingham	United States	Boutwell Memorial Auditorium
11 February 1983	Biloxi	United States	Mississippi Coast Coliseum
12 February 1983	Baton Rouge	United States	Riverside Centroplex
14 February 1983	Austin	United States	Frank Erwin Center
15 February 1983	Beaumont	United States	Beaumont Civic Center
17 February 1983	Tulsa	United States	Tulsa Assembly Center
20 February 1983	Honolulu	United States	Honolulu International Center
21 February 1983	Honolulu	United States	Honolulu International Center
US Festival '83 (Heavy Metal Day) (29 May 1983)
29 May 1983	San Bernardino	United States	Glen Helen Pavilion

^{A} This show was supported by The Rods
^{B} This show was supported by Krokus
^{C} This show was supported by Iron Maiden
^{D} This show was supported by Coney Hatch
^{E} This concert was supported by Uriah Heep
^{F} This concert was supported by Heaven

== Boxscore ==
City	Venue	Tickets sold/Available	Gross revenue (adjusted for inflation)
San Antonio	Convention Center	13,669/13,669 (100%)	$352,356
Dallas	Reunion Arena	11,185/19,000 (59%)	$286,898
Bloomington	Met Center	7,005/7,500 (93%)	$172,391
Rockford	Metro Center	5,244/5,720 (92%)	$121,514
Chicago	International Amphitheater	10,994/10,994 (100%)	$309,024
Detroit	Cobo Arena	9,366/12,191 (77%)	$259,557
Kalamazoo	Wings Stadium	6,536/8,000 (82%)	$163,088
Columbus	Ohio Center	7,179/7,179 (100%)	$166,571
Worcester	The Centrum	8,291/8,547 (97%)	$212,441
New York City	Madison Square Garden	16,606/16,606 (100%)	$544,678
New Haven	Coliseum	9,914/9,914 (100%)	$254,371
Philadelphia	Spectrum	13,151/13,151 (100%)	$341,088
Landover	Capital Center	16,841/17,431 (97%)	$456,752
East Rutherford	Brendan Byrne Arena	17,823/17,823 (100%)	$531,799
Rochester	War Memorial Auditorium	10,200/10,200 (100%)	$246,250
Toronto	Maple Leaf Gardens	11,960/11,960 (100%)	$364,796
Edmonton	Northlands Coliseum	8,927/8,927 (100%)	$290,769
Calgary	Max Bell Arena	3,965/3,965 (100%)	$132,287
Daly City	Cow Palace	14,600/14,600 (100%)	$427,552
San Diego	Sports Arena	10,109/11,200 (90%)	$299,513
Phoenix	Memorial Coliseum	10,510/10,510 (100%)	$292,222
Denver	McNichols Sports Arena	11,922/11,922 (100%)	$259,109
Cincinnati	Gardens	6,344/6,922 (92%)	$132,187
Madison	Dane County Coliseum	8,357/10,000 (84%)	$196,198
Lansing	Civic Center	4,919/4,919 (100%)	$138,069
Saginaw	Wendler Arena	5,959/7,169 (83%)	$152,054
Muskegon	L.C Walker Arena	5,094/7,112 (72%)	$129,982
Salina	Bicentennial Center	3,459/5,000 (69%)	$90,745
Little Rock	Barton Coliseum	4,434/7,500 (59%)	$116,263
Austin	Frank Erwin Center	7,341/7,341 (100%)	$174,206
