= Metal Conqueror Tour =

1984 concert tour by Judas Priest

- Tour by Judas Priest
- Poster to the concert in Syracuse, New York
- Associated album: Defenders of the Faith
- Start date: 20 January 1984
- End date: 13 September 1984
- No. of shows: 125

Judas Priest concert chronology
- World Vengeance Tour (1982–1983); Metal Conqueror Tour (1984); Fuel for Life Tour (1986)

The Metal Conqueror Tour was a concert tour by English heavy metal band Judas Priest in support of the album Defenders of the Faith. It ran from 20 January until 13 September 1984.

Following the tour, the band took a one-year hiatus from touring, apart from a brief performance at the 1985 Live Aid concert in Philadelphia.

== Recordings ==
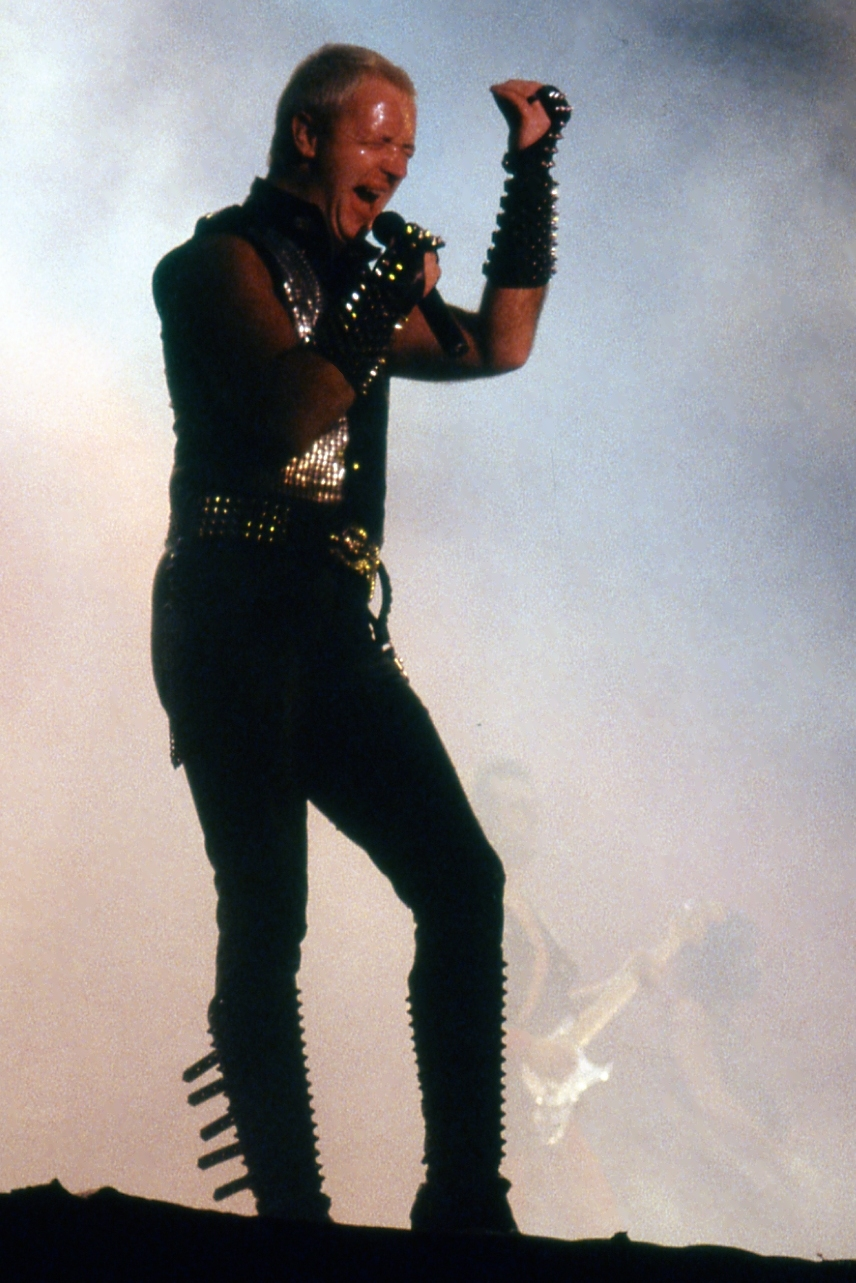
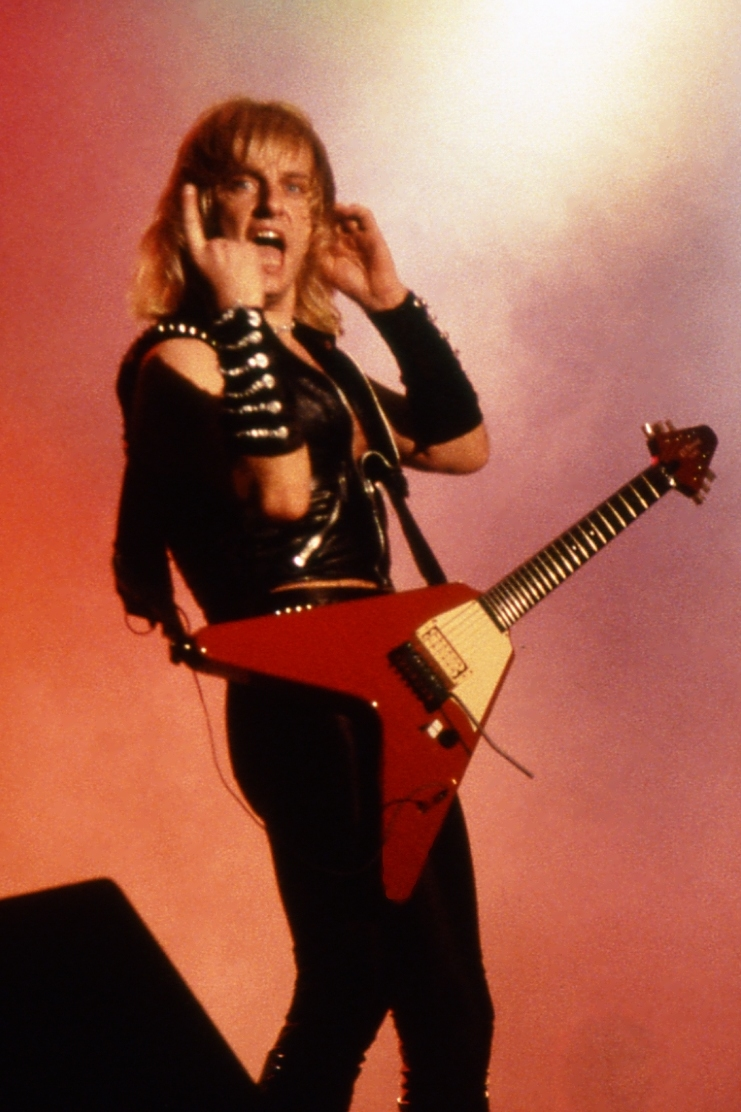
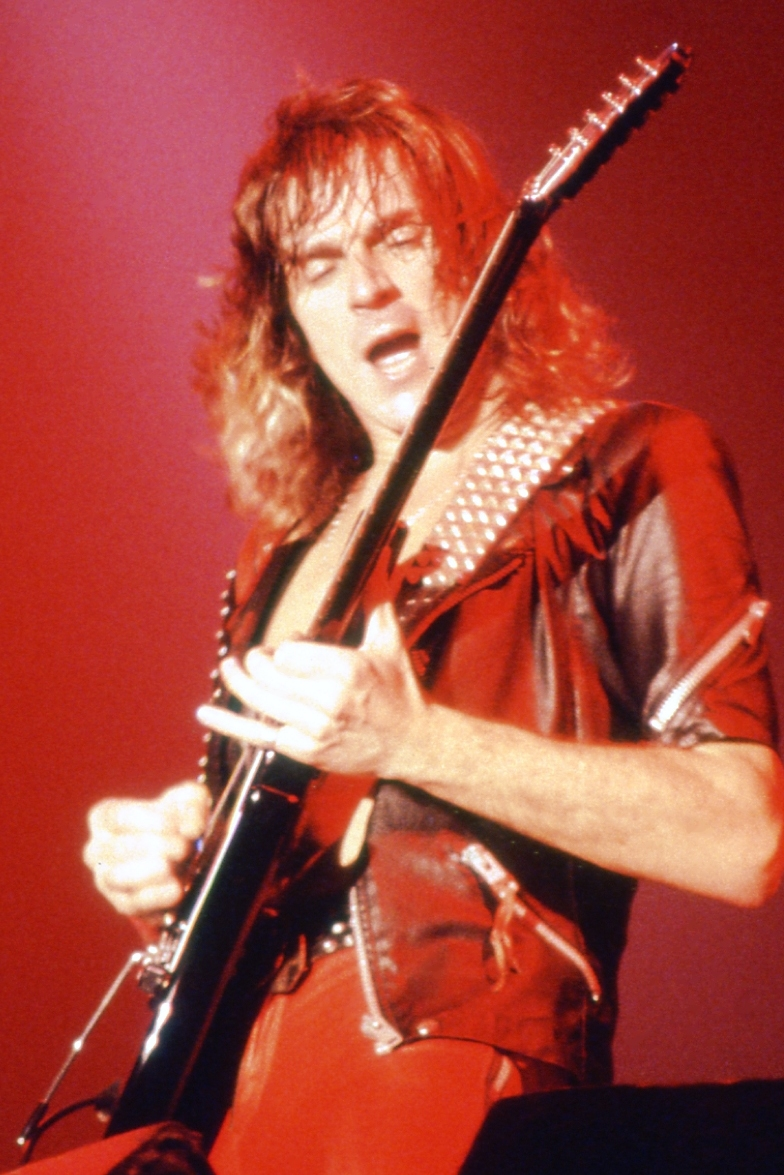
Rob Halford, K.K. Downing and Glenn Tipton, 3 February 1984, in San Sebastián, Spain

The 2015 release of Defenders of the Faith's 30th anniversary edition features the concert from 5 May 1984 in Long Beach Arena, Long Beach, California in its entirety. Prior to this release, select tracks from the same concert were featured as bonus tracks on the 2001 remasters of Sin After Sin, British Steel, Defenders of the Faith, Priest...Live! and Ram It Down.

== Production ==
The stage production featured a large drum riser prop in the shape of the Metallian that adorns the Defenders of the Faith album cover. During the concert, the band members would enter the stage through the prop's mouth, or under either of its raisable legs. Halford's staple live stunt of riding a motorcycle on stage also had him emerge from under one of the legs.

== Europe warm-up leg ==
A special pre-Defenders of the Faith mini tour took place in the United Kingdom and Germany, which went from 12 to 22 December 1983 with support act Quiet Riot. They would also perform at the Rock Pop Festival at Westfalenhallen in Dortmund on 18 December with Iron Maiden, Scorpions, Ozzy Osbourne, Def Leppard and Quiet Riot.

=== Setlist ===
"The Hellion" [Audio Intro]

1. "Electric Eye"
2. "Riding on the Wind"
3. "Heading Out to the Highway"
4. "Grinder"
5. "Metal Gods"
6. "Bloodstone"
7. "Breaking the Law"
8. "Sinner"
9. "Desert Plains"
10. "The Ripper"
11. "Freewheel Burning"
12. "Devil's Child"
13. "Screaming for Vengeance"
14. "You've Got Another Thing Comin'"
15. "Victim of Changes"
16. "Living After Midnight" [1st Encore]
17. "The Green Manalishi" (Fleetwood Mac cover) [Second encore]
18. "Hell Bent for Leather" [Final encore]

"The Hellion" [Audio intro]

1. "Electric Eye"
2. "Riding on the Wind"
3. "Grinder"
4. "Metal Gods"
5. "Bloodstone"
6. "Breaking the Law"
7. "Sinner"
8. "Desert Plains"
9. "The Ripper"
10. "Freewheel Burning"
11. "Screaming for Vengeance"
12. "You've Got Another Thing Comin'"
13. "Victim of Changes"
14. "Living After Midnight" [First encore]
15. "The Green Manalishi" (Fleetwood Mac cover) [Second encore]
16. "Hell Bent for Leather" [Final encore]

=== Tour dates ===
Date	City	Country	Venue
12 December 1983	Newcastle	England	Newcastle City Hall
13 December 1983	Glasgow	Scotland	The Apollo
15 December 1983	Manchester	England	Manchester Apollo
16 December 1983	London	England	Hammersmith Odeon
17 December 1983	London	England	Hammersmith Odeon
18 December 1983	Dortmund	West Germany	Westfalenhallen
20 December 1983	Leicester	England	De Montfort Hall
21 December 1983	Birmingham	England	Birmingham Odeon
22 December 1983	Birmingham	England	Birmingham Odeon

== Setlist ==
The setlist varied throughout the tour. The European setlist consisted of:

"The Hellion" (Taped intro)

1. "Electric Eye"
2. "Riding on the Wind"
3. "Grinder"
4. "Metal Gods"
5. "Bloodstone"
6. "Breaking the Law"
7. "Sinner"
8. "Desert Plains"
9. "The Ripper"
10. "Heavy Duty" (Added on 2 February 1984)
11. "Defenders Of The Faith" (Added on 2 February 1984)
12. "Freewheel Burning"
13. "Screaming For Vengeance" (Replaced by "Some Heads Are Gonna Roll" after 28 January 1984)
14. "You've Got Another Thing Comin'"
15. "Victim of Changes"
16. "Living After Midnight"
17. "The Green Manalishi (With the Two Prong Crown)" (Fleetwood Mac cover)
18. "Hell Bent for Leather"

The U.S. setlist consisted of:

1. "Love Bites"
2. "Jawbreaker"
3. "Grinder"
4. "Metal Gods"
5. "Breaking the Law"
6. "Sinner"
7. "Desert Plains"
8. "Some Heads Are Gonna Roll"
9. "The Sentinel"
10. "Rock Hard, Ride Free"
11. "Night Comes Down"
12. "Electric Eye"
13. "Heavy Duty"
14. "Defenders of the Faith"
15. "Freewheel Burning"
16. "Victim of Changes"
17. "The Green Manalishi (With the Two Prong Crown)" (Fleetwood Mac cover)
18. "Living After Midnight"
19. "Hell Bent for Leather"
20. "You've Got Another Thing Comin'"

"Heading Out to the Highway" was also played on 9 June.

== Tour dates ==
The band toured with Ted Nugent and Raven on the European leg and Great White and Kick Axe on the North American leg.

On 18 June 1984, at Madison Square Garden in New York City, several riots broke out, and the crowd also brawled with venue security and arriving NYPD officers - some in full riot gear - which prompted the venue to ban Priest.

"Madison Square Garden banned us for life", recalled Glenn Tipton. "The audience went berserk and ripped all the seats out. They cost more than a quarter of a million dollars to replace. Me and Ken [KK Downing] went back there to see a tennis match which John McEnroe was playing in. We went incognito, wearing hoodies so no one would recognize us, but the ushers came up to us and said, 'Thanks for the new seats, guys.'"

Date	City	Country	Venue
Europe
20 January 1984	Copenhagen	Denmark	Falkoner Center
21 January 1984	Stockholm	Sweden	Hovet
23 January 1984	Gothenburg	Sweden	Scandinavium
25 January 1984	Nancy	France	Parc des Expositions
26 January 1984	Le Grand-Quevilly	France	Parc des Expositions de Rouen
27 January 1984	Amsterdam	Netherlands	Jaap Edenhal
28 January 1984	Brussels	Belgium	Forest National
30 January 1984	Clermont-Ferrand	France	Maison des Sports
31 January 1984	Clermont-Ferrand	France	Maison des Sports
1 February 1984	Barcelona	Spain	Palau dels Esports de Barcelona
2 February 1984	Madrid	Spain	Raimundo Saporta Pavilion
3 February 1984	San Sebastián	Spain	Velódromo de Anoeta
4 February 1984	Toulouse	France	Palais des Sports
5 February 1984	Marseille	France	Unknown
7 February 1984	Nice	France	Théâtre de Verdure de Nice
8 February 1984	Grenoble	France	Alpexpo
9 February 1984	Lyon	France	Palais d'Hiver
10 February 1984	Strasbourg	France	Hall Tivoli
11 February 1984	Paris	France	Éspace Ballard
13 February 1984	Offenbach	West Germany	Stadthalle
14 February 1984	Neunkirchen am Brand	West Germany	Hemmerleinhalle
15 February 1984	Kaunitz	West Germany	Ostwestfalenhalle
17 February 1984	Böblingen	West Germany	Sporthalle
18 February 1984	Winterthur	Switzerland	Eulachalle
19 February 1984	Munich	West Germany	Rudi-Sedlmayer-Halle
20 February 1984	Eppelheim	West Germany	Rhein-Neckar-Halle
21 February 1984	Düsseldorf	West Germany	Mitsubishi Electric Halle
22 February 1984	Hanover	West Germany	Eilenriedehalle
North America
16 March 1984	Niagara Falls	United States	Niagara Falls Convention Center
18 March 1984	Springfield	United States	Springfield Civic Center
19 March 1984	Portland	United States	Cumberland County Civic Center
21 March 1984	Uniondale	United States	Nassau Coliseum
22 March 1984	New Haven	United States	New Haven Coliseum
23 March 1984	East Rutherford	United States	Brendan Byrne Arena
25 March 1984	Providence	United States	Providence Civic Center
26 March 1984	Worcester	United States	The Centrum
27 March 1984	Glens Falls	United States	Glens Falls Civic Center
28 March 1984	Montreal	Canada	Montreal Forum
30 March 1984	Quebec City	Canada	Colisée de Québec
31 March 1984	Ottawa	Canada	Ottawa Civic Centre
2 April 1984	Toronto	Canada	Maple Leaf Gardens
3 April 1984	Rochester	United States	War Memorial Auditorium
4 April 1984	Syracuse	United States	Onondaga War Memorial Auditorium
6 April 1984	Richfield	United States	Richfield Coliseum
7 April 1984	Kalamazoo	United States	Wings Event Center
9 April 1984	Pittsburgh	United States	Pittsburgh Civic Arena
11 April 1984	Baltimore	United States	Baltimore Civic Center
12 April 1984	Hampton	United States	Hampton Coliseum
13 April 1984	Roanoke	United States	Roanoke Civic Center
14 April 1984	Louisville	United States	Louisville Gardens
16 April 1984	Knoxville	United States	Knoxville Civic Coliseum
17 April 1984	Huntsville	United States	Von Braun Civic Center
18 April 1984	Memphis	United States	Mid-South Coliseum
20 April 1984	Jackson	United States	Mississippi Coliseum
21 April 1984	BIloxi	United States	Mississippi Coast Coliseum
22 April 1984	Baton Rouge	United States	Riverside Centroplex
24 April 1984	Shreveport	United States	Hirsch Memorial Coliseum
25 April 1984	Little Rock	United States	Barton Coliseum
27 April 1984	Houston	United States	The Summit
28 April 1984	San Antonio	United States	HemisFair Arena
29 April 1984	Austin	United States	Frank Erwin Center
30 April 1984	Dallas	United States	Reunion Arena
2 May 1984	Albuquerque	United States	Tingley Coliseum
3 May 1984	Phoenix	United States	Arizona Veterans Memorial Coliseum
5 May 1984	Long Beach	United States	Long Beach Arena
6 May 1984	Long Beach	United States	Long Beach Arena
7 May 1984	Long Beach	United States	Long Beach Arena
9 May 1984	San Diego	United States	San Diego Sports Arena
10 May 1984	Fresno	United States	Selland Arena
12 May 1984	Sacramento	United States	Cal Expo Amphitheatre
24 May 1984	Portland	United States	Portland Memorial Coliseum
25 May 1984	Spokane	United States	Spokane Coliseum
26 May 1984	Tacoma	United States	Tacoma Dome
28 May 1984	Vancouver	Canada	Pacific Coliseum
30 May 1984	Edmonton	Canada	Northlands Coliseum
31 May 1984	Calgary	Canada	Stampede Corral
2 June 1984	Regina	Canada	Regina Agridome
4 June 1984	Winnipeg	Canada	Winnipeg Arena
6 June 1984	La Crosse	United States	La Crosse Center
7 June 1984	Ashwaubenon	United States	Brown County Veterans Memorial Arena
9 June 1984	Madison	United States	Dane County Coliseum
11 June 1984	Saint Paul	United States	Saint Paul Civic Center
13 June 1984	Detroit	United States	Joe Louis Arena
14 June 1984	Rosemont	United States	Rosemont Horizon
16 June 1984	Landover	United States	Capital Centre
17 June 1984	Landover	United States	Capital Centre
18 June 1984	New York City	United States	Madison Square Garden
20 June 1984	Binghamton	United States	Broome County Veterans Memorial Arena
22 June 1984	Bethlehem	United States	Stabler Arena
23 June 1984	Philadelphia	United States	Spectrum
26 June 1984	Greensboro	United States	Greensboro Coliseum
27 June 1984	Charlotte	United States	Charlotte Coliseum
28 June 1984	Atlanta	United States	Omni Coliseum
30 June 1984	Jacksonville	United States	Jacksonville Coliseum
1 July 1984	Pembroke Pines	United States	Hollywood Sportatorium
3 July 1984	Lakeland	United States	Lakeland Civic Center
6 July 1984	Johnson City	United States	Freedom Hall Civic Center
7 July 1984	Nashville	United States	Nashville Municipal Auditorium
9 July 1984	Trotwood	United States	Hara Arena
10 July 1984	Indianapolis	United States	Market Square Arena
13 July 1984	Cedar Rapids	United States	Five Seasons Center
14 July 1984	St. Louis	United States	Kiel Auditorium
15 July 1984	Bonner Springs	United States	Sandstone Amphitheater
17 July 1984	Valley Center	United States	Kansas Coliseum
18 July 1984	Norman	United States	Lloyd Noble Center
20 July 1984	Denver	United States	McNichols Sports Arena
21 July 1984	Casper	United States	Casper Events Center
22 July 1984	Pueblo	United States	State Fairgrounds
24 July 1984	Las Vegas	United States	Thomas & Mack Center
25 July 1984	Reno	United States	Lawlor Events Center
27 July 1984	Daly City	United States	Cow Palace
28 July 1984	Daly City	United States	Cow Palace
29 July 1984	Irvine	United States	Irvine Meadows Amphitheatre
31 July 1984	Salt Lake City	United States	Salt Palace
2 August 1984	Sioux Falls	United States	Sioux Falls Arena
3 August 1984	Bismarck	United States	Bismarck Civic Center
5 August 1984	East Troy	United States	Alpine Valley Music Theatre
7 August 1984	Harrisburg	United States	City Island
8 August 1984	Columbus	United States	Battelle Hall
9 August 1984	Saginaw	United States	Wendler Arena
Japan
6 September 1984	Sendai	Japan	Miyagi-ken Sports Center
7 September 1984	Tokyo	Japan	Shibuya Public Hall
8 September 1984	Nagoya	Japan	Nagoya Civic Assembly Hall
10 September 1984	Osaka	Japan	Osaka Festival Hall
11 September 1984	Osaka	Japan	Osaka Festival Hall
13 September 1984	Tokyo	Japan	Nippon Budokan

== Boxscore ==
City	Venue	Tickets sold/available	Gross revenue (Adjusted for inflation)
Springfield	Civic Center	5,300/6,000 (88%)	$136,069
New Haven	Coliseum	8,340/10,000 (83%)	$250,534
East Rutherford	Brendan Byrne Arena	17,446/17,446 (100%)	$520,540
Providence	Civic Center	8,687/9,826 (88%)	$244,417
Worcester	The Centrum	9,494/11,200 (85%)	$281,747
Toronto	Maple Leaf Gardens	13,081/13,081 (100%)	$343,170
Rochester	War Memorial Auditorium	10,200/10,200 (100%)	$285,965
Pittsburgh	Civic Arena	8,330/12,000 (69%)	$258,337
Baltimore	Civic Center	12,969/12,969 (100%)	$389,002
Houston	The Summit	11,898/12,600 (94%)	$340,524
San Antonio	HemisFair Arena	11,893/11,893 (100%)	$333,338
Austin	Frank Erwin Center	7,085/12,096 (59%)	$193,263
Dallas	Reunion Arena	13,443/13,443 (100%)	$388,665
Albuquerque	Tingley Coliseum	7,257/12,636 (57%)	$223,817
Phoenix	Veterans Memorial Coliseum	12,884/13,000 (99%)	$388,644
Sacramento	Cal Expo Amphitheater	10,000/10,000 (100%)	$363,461
Regina	Agridome	6,310/6,500 (97%)	$161,750
Winnipeg	Arena	12,328/12,500 (99%)	$327,855
Madison	Dane County Coliseum	5,425/10,000 (54%)	$156,000
Detroit	Joe Louis Arena	12,514/13,714 (91%)	$410,774
Rosemont	Horizon	12,379/12,379 (100%)	$307,146
Landover	Capital Center (2 shows)	16,189/31,200 (52%)	$531,406
New York City	Madison Square Garden	16,757/16,757 (100%)	$559,956
Lakeland	Civic Center	9,846/9,846 (100%)	$298,106
Nashville	Municipal Auditorium	6,039/9,900 (61%)	$174,896
Indianapolis	Market Square Arena	5,513/15,000 (37%)	$144,949
St. Louis	Kiel Auditorium	6,748/10,532 (64%)	$193,380
Bonner Springs	Sandstone Amphitheater	7,464/16,000 (47%)	$186,523
Denver	McNichols Sports Arena	10,011/18,553 (54%)	$332,712
Daly City	Cow Palace (27th)	14,500/14,500 (100%)	$489,481
Irvine	Meadows Amphitheater	15,000/15,000 (100%)	$482,674
