= Metalogy =

Box set by Judas Priest
- Released: 11 May 2004
- Recorded: 1974–2001
- Genre: Heavy metal
- Length: 5:03:03
- Label: Columbia / Legacy

Professional ratings
Review scores
Source	Rating
AllMusic link	4.5/5 stars
Rolling Stone link	(favorable)

Metalogy is a four CD + single DVD boxed set released by heavy metal band Judas Priest in 2004. The CDs come in card sleeves and are housed in a faux-leather box, which has studs around the center. The box was re-released in 2008 in a cardboard long-box containing the same 4 CDs as the original release, but not the DVD, which is sold separately. It was re-released for a second time in September 2013 as a hardback mediabook, again without the DVD.

== Metalogy ==
Disc one
No.	Title	Writer(s)	Original	Length
1.	"Never Satisfied"	Al Atkins, K. K. Downing	Rocka Rolla (1974)	4:52
2.	"Deceiver"	Rob Halford, Downing, Glenn Tipton	Sad Wings of Destiny (1976)	2:40
3.	"Tyrant"	Halford, Tipton	Sad Wings of Destiny (1976)	4:39
4.	"Victim of Changes" (live)	Atkins, Halford, Downing, Tipton	Unleashed in the East (1979)	7:11
5.	"Diamonds & Rust" (live Joan Baez cover)	Joan Baez	You've Got Another Thing Coming 7" (1982)	3:28
6.	"Starbreaker" (live)	Halford, Tipton, Downing	Take on the World 7" (1979)	7:19
7.	"Sinner"	Halford, Tipton	Sin After Sin (1977)	6:43
8.	"Let Us Prey / Call for the Priest"	Halford, Tipton, Downing	Sin After Sin (1977)	6:12
9.	"Dissident Aggressor"	Halford, Tipton, Downing	Sin After Sin (1977)	3:02
10.	"Exciter"	Halford, Tipton	Stained Class (1978)	5:33
11.	"Beyond the Realms of Death"	Halford, Les Binks	Stained Class (1978)	6:51
12.	"Better by You, Better than Me" (Spooky Tooth cover)	Gary Wright	Stained Class (1978)	3:22
13.	"Invader"	Halford, Tipton, Ian Hill	Stained Class (1978)	4:10
14.	"Stained Class"	Halford, Tipton	Stained Class (1978)	5:12
15.	"The Green Manalishi (With the Two Pronged Crown)" (live Fleetwood Mac cover)	Peter Green	Previously unreleased, recorded at New York Palladium in 1981 for a radio broadcast	4:42

Disc two
No.	Title	Writer(s)	Original album	Length
1.	"Killing Machine"	Tipton	Killing Machine (1978)	3:02
2.	"Evening Star"	Halford, Tipton	Killing Machine (1978)	4:06
3.	"Take On the World"	Halford, Tipton	Killing Machine (1978)	3:03
4.	"Delivering the Goods"	Halford, Tipton, Downing	Killing Machine (1978)	4:16
5.	"Evil Fantasies"	Halford, Tipton, Downing	Killing Machine (1978)	4:13
6.	"Hell Bent for Leather"	Tipton	Killing Machine (1978)	2:40
7.	"Breaking the Law" (live)	Halford, Tipton, Downing	The Green Manalishi 12" (1983), Freewheel Burning 7" (1984)	2:45
8.	"Living After Midnight"	Halford, Tipton, Downing	British Steel (1980)	3:30
9.	"Rapid Fire"	Halford, Tipton, Downing	British Steel (1980)	4:00
10.	"Metal Gods"	Halford, Tipton, Downing	British Steel (1980)	4:04
11.	"Grinder" (live)	Halford, Tipton, Downing	Previously released as a bonus track to the British Steel remaster, recorded in Long Beach in 1984 for a radio broadcast	4:21
12.	"The Rage"	Halford, Tipton, Downing	British Steel (1980)	4:44
13.	"Heading Out to the Highway"	Halford, Tipton, Downing	Point of Entry (1981)	3:45
14.	"Hot Rockin'" (live)	Halford, Tipton, Downing	Hot Rockin Promo 12" (1981)	3:28
15.	"Troubleshooter"	Halford, Tipton, Downing	Point of Entry (1981)	3:47
16.	"Solar Angels"	Halford, Tipton, Downing	Point of Entry (1981)	4:04
17.	"Desert Plains"	Halford, Tipton, Downing	Point of Entry (1981)	4:36
18.	"The Hellion / Electric Eye" (live)	Halford, Tipton, Downing	The Hellion / Electric Eye Promo 12" (1983)	4:20
19.	"Screaming for Vengeance"	Halford, Tipton, Downing	Screaming for Vengeance (1982)	4:43

Disc three
No.	Title	Writer(s)	Original album	Length
1.	"Riding on the Wind"	Halford, Tipton, Downing	Screaming for Vengeance (1982)	3:07
2.	"Bloodstone"	Halford, Tipton, Downing	Screaming for Vengeance (1982)	3:52
3.	"You've Got Another Thing Comin'"	Halford, Tipton, Downing	Screaming for Vengeance (1982)	5:09
4.	"Devil's Child"	Halford, Tipton, Downing	Screaming for Vengeance (1982)	4:48
5.	"Freewheel Burning"	Halford, Tipton, Downing	Defenders of the Faith (1984)	4:42
6.	"Jawbreaker"	Halford, Tipton, Downing	Defenders of the Faith (1984)	3:25
7.	"The Sentinel"	Halford, Tipton, Downing	Defenders of the Faith (1984)	5:24
8.	"Love Bites" (live)	Halford, Tipton, Downing	Previously unreleased, recorded in St. Louis, Missouri in 1986 for a radio broadcast	5:37
9.	"Eat Me Alive"	Halford, Tipton, Downing	Defenders of the Faith (1984)	3:31
10.	"Some Heads Are Gonna Roll"	Bob Halligan Jr.	Defenders of the Faith (1984)	4:05
11.	"Rock Hard Ride Free"	Halford, Tipton, Downing	Defenders of the Faith (1984)	5:00
12.	"Night Comes Down"	Halford, Tipton, Downing	Defenders of the Faith (1984)	4:00
13.	"Turbo Lover"	Halford, Tipton, Downing	Turbo (1986)	5:33
14.	"Private Property"	Halford, Tipton, Downing	Turbo (1986)	4:29
15.	"Parental Guidance"	Halford, Tipton, Downing	Turbo (1986)	3:35
16.	"Out in the Cold"	Halford, Tipton, Downing	Turbo (1986)	6:27
17.	"Heart of a Lion" (studio version)	Halford, Tipton, Downing	previously unreleased, from the Turbo sessions (1986)	3:53

Disc four
No.	Title	Writer(s)	Original album	Length
1.	"Ram It Down"	Halford, Tipton, Downing	Ram It Down (1988)	4:48
2.	"Heavy Metal"	Halford, Tipton, Downing	Ram It Down (1988)	5:58
3.	"Come and Get it"	Halford, Tipton, Downing	Ram It Down (1988)	4:05
4.	"Blood Red Skies"	Halford, Tipton, Downing	Ram It Down (1988)	7:05
5.	"Painkiller"	Halford, Tipton, Downing	Painkiller (1990)	6:06
6.	"Between the Hammer & the Anvil"	Halford, Tipton, Downing	Painkiller (1990)	4:48
7.	"A Touch of Evil"	Halford, Downing, Tipton, Chris Tsangarides	Painkiller (1990)	5:44
8.	"Metal Meltdown"	Halford, Tipton, Downing	Painkiller (1990)	4:47
9.	"Night Crawler"	Halford, Tipton, Downing	Painkiller (1990)	5:44
10.	"All Guns Blazing"	Halford, Tipton, Downing	Painkiller (1990)	3:57
11.	"Jugulator"	Downing, Tipton	Jugulator (1997)	5:50
12.	"Blood Stained"	Downing, Tipton	Jugulator (1997)	5:26
13.	"Machine Man"	Tipton	Demolition (2001)	5:15
14.	"Feed on Me"	Tipton	Demolition (2001)	5:28

=== Disc 5 (Live Vengeance '82 DVD) ===
1. "The Hellion/Electric Eye"
2. "Riding on the Wind"
3. "Heading Out to the Highway"
4. "Metal Gods"
5. "Bloodstone"
6. "Breaking the Law"
7. "Sinner"
8. "Desert Plains"
9. "The Ripper"
10. "Diamonds & Rust"
11. "Devil's Child"
12. "Screaming for Vengeance"
13. "You've Got Another Thing Comin'"
14. "Victim of Changes"
15. "Living After Midnight"
16. "The Green Manalishi (With the Two Pronged Crown)"
17. "Hell Bent for Leather"

== Personnel ==
- Rob Halford – Vocals on Discs 1–3, tracks 1–10 on Disc 4, and Disc 5
- Tim "Ripper" Owens – Vocals on tracks 11–14 on Disc 4
- K.K. Downing – Guitar
- Glenn Tipton – Guitar
- Ian Hill – Bass
- John Hinch – Drums on "Never Satisfied" on Disc 1
- Alan Moore – Drums on "Deceiver" and "Tyrant" on Disc 1
- Simon Phillips – Drums on tracks 7–9 on Disc 1
- Les Binks – Drums on tracks 4–6 and 10–15 on Disc 1, and tracks 1–6 on Disc 2
- Dave Holland – Drums on tracks 7–19 on Disc 2, all of Disc 3, tracks 1–4 on Disc 4, and all of Disc 5
- Scott Travis – Drums on tracks 5–14 on Disc 4

== Charts ==
Chart (2004)	Peak position
Japanese Albums (Oricon)	147
