= Live Vengeance '82 =

Video by Judas Priest
- Released: 4 April 2006
- Recorded: 12 December 1982
- Venue: Mid-South Coliseum (Memphis, Tennessee)
- Genre: Heavy metal
- Label: Columbia / Sony
- Producer: Mick Anger

Judas Priest chronology
Rising in the East (2005)	Live Vengeance '82 (2006)	Epitaph (2013)

Live Vengeance '82 is a live DVD and UMD of a Judas Priest concert recorded on 12 December 1982, at the Mid-South Coliseum in Memphis, Tennessee. It was released on 4 April 2006 in both an Amaray case and a limited edition digipak. The first release on DVD had been in 2004 as Disc 5 of the Metalogy compilation box-set, which came in a simple card-sleeve.

The footage was originally released on VHS, and later on laserdisc, as Judas Priest Live. The Japanese laserdisc omitted "Diamonds And Rust" and "The Green Manalishi (With the Two Pronged Crown)", giving it a running-time of 84 minutes. This version comes in a CX encoded analogue soundtrack and doesn't have a digital soundtrack. The track listing misprints "Devil's Child" as "Davil's Child".

"Screaming for Vengeance" appears as a bonus track on the 2001 re-issue of Priest...Live! and "Devil's Child" appears on the 2012 re-issue of Screaming for Vengeance.

The DVD was re-released in 2009 as part of the label's "Visual Milestones" series.

== Track listing ==
No.	Title	Length
1.	"The Hellion/Electric Eye"	4:30
2.	"Riding on the Wind"	3:08
3.	"Heading Out to the Highway"	3:03
4.	"Metal Gods"	4:30
5.	"Bloodstone"	4:10
6.	"Breaking the Law"	4:20
7.	"Sinner"	8:26
8.	"Desert Plains"	6:02
9.	"The Ripper"	2:46
10.	"Diamonds & Rust" (Joan Baez cover)	4:01
11.	"Devil's Child"	4:03
12.	"Screaming for Vengeance"	3:45
13.	"You've Got Another Thing Comin'"	4:29
14.	"Victim of Changes"	11:48

Encore 1

No.	Title	Length
15.	"Living After Midnight"	8:03
16.	"The Green Manalishi (With the Two Prong Crown)" (Fleetwood Mac cover)	9:07

Encore 2

No.	Title	Length
17.	"Hell Bent for Leather"	9:18
Total length:		1:35:29

== Personnel ==
Judas Priest

- Rob Halford - Vocals
- K. K. Downing - Guitars
- Glenn Tipton - Guitars
- Ian Hill - Bass
- Dave Holland - Drums

Production

- Paul Natkin - Photography
- Neal Preston - Photography
- Geoffrey Thomas - Photography
- David Axtell - Artwork, Design
- Mick Anger - Director
- Jayne Andrews - Coordinator
