= HemisFair Arena =

Arena in Texas, United States

- San Antonio Convention Center Arena
- Location: 601 HemisFair Way; San Antonio, Texas 78203
- Coordinates: 29.420134°N 98.483299°W
- Owner: City of San Antonio
- Capacity: Basketball: 16,057
- Surface: Multi-surface

Construction
- Groundbreaking: 1966
- Opened: April 6, 1968
- Renovated: 1977-78
- Expanded: 1977-78
- Closed: May 31, 1995
- Demolished: June 1995
- Architects: Noonan, Krocker & Dockery
- General contractor: Lyda/H. A. Lott

Tenants
- San Antonio Spurs (ABA/NBA) (1973–93); San Antonio Force (AFL) (1992)

HemisFair Arena (also known as the San Antonio Convention Center Arena) was an indoor arena located in San Antonio, Texas. It was home to the ABA/NBA's San Antonio Spurs from 1973 to 1993 and the San Antonio Force of the AFL during the 1992 season, their only year of existence.

== History ==
=== Construction ===
The arena was originally built as part of (and named for) the 1968 HemisFair. The facility was located in Downtown San Antonio near the Tower of the Americas, one of the most recognizable landmarks in the city. HemisFair Arena and the Tower of the Americas were constructed by a joint venture of two contractors—Lyda Inc. of San Antonio and H. A. Lott, Inc. of Houston.

=== As home of the San Antonio Spurs ===
The arena initially held 10,146 fans for basketball. The San Antonio Spurs of the American Basketball Association moved to the arena after the Dallas Chaparrals relocated following the 1972–73 ABA season. The February 1974 arrival of Hall of Famer George Gervin helped transform the franchise. The Spurs were such a success as an ABA franchise that they became one of four ABA franchises absorbed into the NBA following the ABA-NBA merger in 1976.

The Spurs played their first game at the arena on October 10, 1973, losing to the San Diego Conquistadors 121-106 in front of 5,879. Throughout its lifespan, it was considered one of the loudest arenas in the NBA. As Spurs games began regularly selling out, new seating was added in 1978 by raising the roof of the arena, allowing the construction of an upper deck, increasing the capacity to more than 16,000. While the renovation boosted capacity, it did result in a large number of obstructed view seats in the lower levels due to the support beams required for the upper deck. In 1986, the White Way Sign/Sony JumboTron center-hung video scoreboard was introduced, remaining at the arena for the rest of its life. It was the first center-mounted arena JumboTron in existence.

=== Final events ===
HemisFair Arena was torn down in 1995, two years after the Spurs moved to the Alamodome in 1993. The last Spurs game at HemisFair Arena took place May 20, 1993, when the Spurs lost to the Phoenix Suns in Game 6 the Western Conference semifinals in the 1993 NBA Playoffs on a last-second jump shot by league MVP Charles Barkley. The last ticketed event to be held at the facility was a Van Halen concert March 25, 1995. The last event at HemisFair Arena was a graduation for a local high school, Thomas Jefferson High School, on May 30, 1995. The site is now the location of an expansion to the adjacent Henry B. Gonzalez Convention Center.

=== Seating capacity ===
The seating capacity for basketball was:

Years	Capacity
1968–1976	10,146
1976–1978	10,446
1978–1979	16,055
1980–1981	16,114
1981–1987	15,800
1987–1988	15,770
1988–1990	15,861
1990–1991	15,908
1991–1995	16,057

== Notable concerts ==
- Johnny Cash performed at HemisFair Arena on September 14, 1969.
- The Grateful Dead performed at HemisFair Arena on February 21, 1970. Also on the bill were Quicksilver Messenger Service and John Mayall.
- Elvis Presley performed at HemisFair Arena on April 18, 1972. The concert was one of several filmed for the 1972 documentary Elvis on Tour.
- The Jacksons performed at HemisFair Arena on July 15, 1981, during their Triumph tour.
- Judas Priest performed at HemisFair Arena in September 1982 on their World Vengeance Tour. This was recorded for a radio broadcast and some performances were included on the 30th Anniversary Edition of their 1982 album Screaming for Vengeance released in 2012.
- Whitney Houston performed at the venue in June 1991 during the I'm Your Baby Tonight World Tour, her third concert tour.
- Selena held her third and final fashion show at HemisFair Arena in December 1994 followed by a concert.

Preceded by State Fair Coliseum & Moody Coliseum	Home of the San Antonio Spurs; 1973 – 1993	Succeeded by Alamodome
