= Screaming for Vengeance =

- Cover art by Doug Johnson

Studio album by Judas Priest
- Released: 1 July 1982
- Recorded: 1982
- Studios: Ibiza Sound Studios, Ibiza, Spain; Beejay Studios, Orlando, Florida, US
- Genre: Heavy metal
- Length: 38:43
- Label: Columbia
- Producer: Tom Allom

Judas Priest chronology
Point of Entry (1981)	Screaming for Vengeance (1982)	Defenders of the Faith (1984)

Singles from Screaming for Vengeance
- 1. "You've Got Another Thing Comin'" Released: 6 August 1982; 2. "(Take These) Chains" Released: 15 October 1982

Screaming for Vengeance is the eighth studio album by English heavy metal band Judas Priest, released on 1 July 1982 in the United States and on 9 July 1982 in the United Kingdom by Columbia Records. The album continues the more commercial, streamlined direction that their previous two albums, Point of Entry and British Steel had taken, albeit returning to a heavier, harder sound.

Considered the band's commercial breakthrough in North America, it has been certified double platinum in the United States and platinum in Canada. Screaming for Vengeance spawned the hit "You've Got Another Thing Comin'", which became one of the band's signature songs and a perennial radio favourite.

== Recording ==
Screaming for Vengeance was recorded at Ibiza Sound Studios, Ibiza, Spain. During this period, it was common for UK-based musicians to record in continental Europe for tax purposes.

Mixing and overdubs were done at Beejay Recording Studios in Orlando, Florida and Bayshore Recording Studios in Coconut Grove, Florida.

== Musical style ==
It showcased a harder, heavier sound than British Steel and saw the band revert into straight heavy rock after the melodically styled Point of Entry. The album also marks the first time a drummer played on more than two Judas Priest albums, with Dave Holland having also played on British Steel and Point of Entry.

The album's most commercially successful track, "You've Got Another Thing Comin'", was a last-minute addition. According to guitarist K. K. Downing, "We were quite happy with the album, but decided late on that we could add one more song. I know we had some of the parts, but we set about completing "Another Thing Comin'" during the mixing sessions at Bee Jay studios. It came together quite quickly, and I seem to remember that we all had a good feeling about it, as it did sound like a good driving song and possibly a good radio track." Rob Halford expressed surprise at the song's success, saying "that track was buried. Normally the tracks you think are going to do stuff are at the front end of the release. But our friends at Sony said, 'We're going to go for this song.' And we didn't really know what was going on. But then the feedback was coming over: 'Hey, the record's buzzing in this town and that town', and it just took off."

== Release ==
Screaming for Vengeance was released in July 1982, with a remastered CD released in May 2001. "Fight for Your Life", recorded during the Screaming for Vengeance sessions, was left off but subsequently reworked as the song "Rock Hard Ride Free" on the next album, Defenders of the Faith. The original version saw the light of day as a bonus track on the 2001 remastered version of 1978's Killing Machine. To celebrate the album's 30th anniversary, a remastered CD with bonus 1982 live tracks and a bonus DVD of the band's performance from the 1983 US Festival were released. The most recent remaster was released in late 2017 as part of the Sony We Are Vinyl series, on vinyl and digital download only.

=== Commercial performance ===
Screaming for Vengeance was Judas Priest's breakthrough in North America. Although the band had achieved a cult following among American audiences by 1979 and could headline their own tours, they sold "relatively few" records there before Screaming for Vengeance. The album reached No. 11 on the UK Albums Chart and No. 17 on the US Billboard 200 Pop Albums. It was certified gold by the RIAA on 29 October 1982, platinum on 18 April 1983, and 2× platinum on 16 October 2001, being the band's first album to achieve the two latter awards. It was also extremely successful worldwide. As of the album's 30th anniversary in 2012, it remains the top-selling release of Judas Priest's career.. As 2008, sales of Screaming for Vengeance were nearly 3 million units worldwide, with 2 million in the US alone

== Tour ==
The World Vengeance Tour began shortly after the album's release in July 1982 and focused on North America during the summer and fall, Priest not performing in Europe until December 1983. This emphasis on US audiences was in order to establish a solid commercial foothold there, and in particular because "You've Got Another Thing Comin'" became a major hit. That and "Electric Eye" became live setlist staples and some of the band's most performed songs. "Devil's Child" was also performed on various tours between 1982 and 2008, and "Riding on the Wind", "Bloodstone" and the title track have also been in the setlist on various tours. For comparison, "Fever" was only played at the first two 1982 shows, "(Take These) Chains" only appeared in the setlist in 2019, while "Pain and Pleasure" and the instrumental "The Hellion" have never been performed live (though a recording of the song is frequently played before performances of "Electric Eye"). The 30th-anniversary release of the album in 2012 came with a DVD of a live show recorded in May 1983 at the US Festival in California on the last date of the Screaming For Vengeance Tour. During the US tour to support the album in 1982, Judas Priest were supported by bands such as Iron Maiden, Krokus, and Uriah Heep.

== Reception ==
Professional ratings
Review scores
Source	Rating
AllMusic	4/5 stars
Blogcritics	(favourable) (30th Ann.)
Decibel	(mixed)
Metal Storm	10/10
PopMatters	7/10 (30th Ann.)
Martin Popoff	9/10
Sounds	4/5 stars
Sputnikmusic	3.5/5
Terrorizer	5/5 (30th Ann.)

The album has received acclaim since its release, and is regarded as one of the band's best albums. Writing for Allmusic, Steve Huey would rate the album 4 stars out of 5, explaining, "Having moved a bit too far into simplistic hard rock, Vengeance found the band refocusing on heavy metal, and achieving a greater balance between commercialism and creativity. The results were catchy and accessible, yet harder-hitting, and without the awkwardly apparent calculation that informed the weakest moments of the album's two predecessors."

Metal Storm's Pierre Tombale gave the album a 10/10, declaring, "It is a masterpiece indeed, filled with classics, filled with rocking NWOBHM."

== Legacy ==
=== Accolades ===
The album ranked 15th on IGN's 25 most influential metal albums. Screaming for Vengeance also came 10th on Metal-Rules.com's 100 greatest metal albums. Kerrang! listed the album at No. 46 among the "100 Greatest Heavy Metal Albums of All Time". In 2017, it was ranked 12th on Rolling Stone's list of "100 Greatest Metal Albums of All Time". In 2022, Screaming for Vengeance was named #2 of 'The 25 greatest rock guitar albums of 1982' list in Guitar World.

=== In popular culture ===
"You've Got Another Thing Comin'" is featured as a playable track in the video game Guitar Hero. "Electric Eye" (with the accompanying intro track "The Hellion") was playable in Guitar Hero Encore: Rocks the 80s and Guitar Hero Smash Hits. The entire album was the first album released as downloadable content for the video games Rock Band and Rock Band 2.

The title song "Screaming for Vengeance" was played on the main site for the video game Brütal Legend. In the game, Rob Halford voices a villain named General Lionwhyte, as well as a heroic character called the Fire Baron, modeled after his likeness. The track "You've Got Another Thing Comin'" was featured in the 2002 video game Grand Theft Auto: Vice City as part of the V-Rock radio station, whilst "Electric Eye" was featured on the same radio station in the 2006 prequel Grand Theft Auto: Vice City Stories. The song "Riding on the Wind" was featured in the 2012 video game Twisted Metal.

As well as "You've Got Another Thing Comin'" featuring in the eleventh season's first episode, Archer continues the running gag of Dr. Krieger's vans with "Screaming for Van-geance" featuring in the episode "Helping Hands".

The bonus track "Prisoner of Your Eyes" was featured in the 2024 slasher movie MaXXXine.

== Track listing ==
=== Original release ===
All tracks are written by Glenn Tipton, Rob Halford and K. K. Downing, except "(Take These) Chains" written by Bob Halligan, Jr.

Side one
No.	Title	Length
1.	"The Hellion"	0:41
2.	"Electric Eye"	3:39
3.	"Riding on the Wind"	3:07
4.	"Bloodstone"	3:51
5.	"(Take These) Chains"	3:07
6.	"Pain and Pleasure"	4:17

Side two
No.	Title	Length
1.	"Screaming for Vengeance"	4:43
2.	"You've Got Another Thing Comin'"	5:09
3.	"Fever"	5:20
4.	"Devil's Child"	4:48
Total length:		38:43

2001 CD edition bonus tracks
No.	Title	Length
11.	"Prisoner of Your Eyes" (recorded during the 1985 Turbo sessions)	7:12
12.	"Devil's Child" (live at Mid-South Coliseum, Memphis, Tennessee; 12 December 1982)	5:02
Total length:		50:57

30th Anniversary Edition bonus tracks
No.	Title	Length
11.	"Electric Eye" (live at San Antonio Civic Center, San Antonio, 10 September 1982)	4:25
12.	"Riding on the Wind" (live at San Antonio Civic Center, San Antonio, 10 September 1982)	3:10
13.	"You've Got Another Thing Comin'" (live at San Antonio Civic Center, San Antonio, 10 September 1982)	7:18
14.	"Screaming for Vengeance" (live at San Antonio Civic Center, San Antonio, 10 September 1982)	4:45
15.	"Devil's Child" (live at Mid-South Coliseum, Memphis, Tennessee; 12 December 1982)	5:02
16.	"Prisoner of Your Eyes" (recorded during the 1985 Turbo sessions)	7:12
Total length:		70:35

=== 30th Anniversary Edition Live DVD ===
All tracks are written by Glenn Tipton, Rob Halford and K. K. Downing, except where noted. All tracks were filmed and recorded at the second US Festival, Devore, San Bernardino, California, 29 May 1983. One track from the set was cut because of audio problems with the source material.

No.	Title	Writer(s)	Length
1.	"Electric Eye"
2.	"Riding on the Wind"
3.	"Heading Out to the Highway"
4.	"Metal Gods"
5.	"Breaking the Law"
6.	"Diamonds and Rust" (Joan Baez cover)	Joan Baez
7.	"Victim of Changes"	Al Atkins; Tipton; Halford; Downing
8.	"Living After Midnight"
9.	"The Green Manalishi (With the Two Prong Crown)" (Fleetwood Mac cover)	Peter Green
10.	"Screaming for Vengeance"
11.	"You've Got Another Thing Comin'"
12.	"Hell Bent for Leather"

== Personnel ==
Judas Priest

- Rob Halford – vocals
- K. K. Downing – guitars
- Glenn Tipton – guitars
- Ian Hill – bass guitar
- Dave Holland – drums

Production

- Produced by Tom Allom
- Engineered by Louis Austin
- Cover design by John Berg, based on a concept by Judas Priest
- Artwork by Doug Johnson
- Photography by Steve Joester

== Charts ==
Chart (1982–83)	Peak position
Australian Albums (Kent Music Report)	81
Canada Top Albums/CDs (RPM)	17
Finnish Albums (The Official Finnish Charts)	17
German Albums (Offizielle Top 100)	23
Japanese Albums (Oricon)	72
Norwegian Albums (VG-lista)	26
Swedish Albums (Sverigetopplistan)	14
UK Albums (Official Charts)	11
US Billboard 200	17

Chart (2012)	Peak position
Belgian Albums (Ultratop Flanders)	173
Belgian Albums (Ultratop Wallonia)	139
Scottish Albums (Official Charts)	99
Spanish Albums (Promusicae)	84
UK Rock & Metal Albums (Official Charts)	6

== Certifications ==
Region	Certification	Certified units/sales
Canada (Music Canada)	Platinum	100,000^{^}
United States (RIAA)	2× Platinum	2,000,000^{^}
^{^} Shipments figures based on certification alone.

== Notable cover versions ==
- Sepultura performed a cover of the title track, "Screaming for Vengeance", on their Dante XXI album.
- Iced Earth performed a cover of the title track, "Screaming for Vengeance", on the tribute album Tribute to the Gods.
- Stratovarius performed a cover of "Bloodstone" on the album Intermission.
- Helloween performed a cover of "The Hellion" / "Electric Eye" on the single "The Time of the Oath". The cover also appears on the album Treasure Chest.
- As I Lay Dying performed a cover of "The Hellion" / "Electric-Eye" on the compilation album Decas.
- Fozzy covered "Riding on the Wind" on their debut album Fozzy.
- Abbath covered "Riding on the Wind" on their 2015 single Count the Dead.
