= Turbo Lover =

1986 single by Judas Priest

- Cover for the 7" single

Single by Judas Priest

from the album Turbo
- B-side: "Hot for Love"
- Released: 7 April 1986
- Recorded: 1985
- Genre: Glam metal; synth-metal
- Length: 5:33
- Label: Columbia
- Songwriters: Rob Halford; K. K. Downing; Glenn Tipton
- Producer: Tom Allom

Judas Priest singles chronology
"Some Heads Are Gonna Roll" (1984)	"Turbo Lover" (1986)	"Locked In" (1986)

Music video
- "Turbo Lover" on YouTube

"Turbo Lover" is a song by the British heavy metal group Judas Priest that the band released as a single from their album Turbo. Both came out in 1986. Unlike the album, which reviewed mixed and often critical responses, most of the reception for this song has been positive, and it has been praised as a Judas Priest classic by music journalists.

The song's lyrics allude to motorcycle riding, and it broadly features an aggressive, sexual tone, with frontman Rob Halford having described the single as embodying "escapism". Musically, it incorporates a synthesizer-based sound into the band's traditional type of heavy metal music. One music magazine has compared the particular style of "Turbo Lover" to that of Kraftwerk.

== Lyrics ==
The song's lyrics have been described as being about "auto"-eroticism. An article by the musical publication Loudwire remarked that the track succeeded by "[c]elebrating the band's connection with motorcycle culture and everything leather".

Frontman Rob Halford has said: "I just liked the analogy of the motorcycle as a euphemism for love. And 'I'm your turbo lover, Tell me there's no other.' It's got kind of a sexual undertone to it – which is fine. It's been done many times in rock n' roll: to use a machine, car, or motorcycle. It's just a fun bit of escapism more than anything else."

== Reception ==
The music journalist Steve Huey, writing for the service AllMusic, praised the track as "a successful reimagining of the Priest formula" and otherwise stated in his review of the song's parent album, Turbo, that he viewed it "easily the best song on the record". Mike DeGagne for AllMusic wrote: "[...] although it still has ample amounts of Priests' heavy metal gusto, it doesn't wander into the chasms of the ferociously boisterous like most of their '70s material." A piece published by Decibel Magazine described the single as "one of the classiest songs in [Judas Priest's discography]". As well, the musical publication Loudwire ranked the song at number ten on its list of the "10 Best Judas Priest Songs".

== Track listing ==
7" single

Side A
No.	Title	Length
1.	"Turbo Lover"	4:39

Side B
No.	Title	Length
1.	"Hot for Love"	4:12

European 12" single

Side A
No.	Title	Length
1.	"Turbo Lover" (Extended Version)	5:33

Side B
No.	Title	Length
1.	"Hot for Love"	4:12

US 12" single

Side A
No.	Title	Length
1.	"Turbo Lover" (Hi-Octane Mix; Long Version)	7:24

Side B
No.	Title	Length
1.	"Turbo Lover" (Hi-Octane Mix; Short Version)	3:59

== Personnel ==
Personnel taken from Turbo liner notes.

- Rob Halford – vocals
- Glenn Tipton – lead guitar, guitar synthesiser
- K. K. Downing – rhythm guitar, guitar synthesiser
- Ian Hill – bass
- Dave Holland – drums

== Charts ==
Chart (1986)	Peak position
US Mainstream Rock (Billboard)	44

== See also ==
- 1986 in British music
- Heavy metal music
- Judas Priest discography
