= You've Got Another Thing Comin' =

Single by Judas Priest

from the album Screaming for Vengeance
- B-side: "Exciter (live)"
- Released: 6 August 1982 (UK)
- Recorded: 1982
- Genre: Heavy metal
- Length: 5:05 (album version); 4:10 (single version)
- Label: Columbia
- Songwriters: Rob Halford; K. K. Downing; Glenn Tipton
- Producer: Tom Allom

Judas Priest singles chronology
"Hot Rockin'" (1981)	"You've Got Another Thing Comin'" (1982)	"(Take These) Chains" (1982)

Music video
- "You've Got Another Thing Comin'" on YouTube

"You've Got Another Thing Comin'" is a song by English heavy metal band Judas Priest. It was originally released on their 1982 album Screaming for Vengeance and released as a single later that year. In May 2006, VH1 ranked it fifth on their list of the 40 Greatest Metal Songs. It became one of Judas Priest's signature songs along with "Electric Eye" and "Breaking the Law", and a staple of the band's live performances. "You've Got Another Thing Comin'" was first performed on the opening concert of the Vengeance World Tour at the Stabler Center in Bethlehem, Pennsylvania, on 26 August 1982 and had been played a total of 673 times through the 2012 Epitaph Tour.

The song reached No. 67 on the Billboard Hot 100 chart, making it Judas Priest's only song to make that chart.

== Background ==
Singer Rob Halford said the lyrics were about "Just this attitude that we've always had in Priest. And I dare say, we've always had in our personal way of dealing with issues that are sent to challenge us. ... It's also wrapped up in the heavy metal community culture of the way we support each other with our metal. It's very much a song of hope and rising above the issues or difficulties that come your way. It's a song of resilience, as well."

== Charting ==
"You've Got Another Thing Comin'" has charted in two countries in the United Kingdom and in the United States. In the United Kingdom it peaked at No. 66 in the UK Singles Chart and in the US, it reached No. 4 on the Billboard rock chart and No. 67 on the Billboard Hot 100.

== Music video ==
The music video was directed by Julien Temple, and filmed at the Kempton Park Water Works. It features the band performing outside the pumping station among a background of lasers and smoke. Meanwhile, a higher authority figure arrives to shut the group down due to the noise level only to have his head blown off and his pants fall off at the end of the video as a result of the exceeding force of Halford's voice.

== Reception ==
Wayne Parry of the Associated Press called it, along with "Hell Bent for Leather" and "Living After Midnight", one of the "standards against which other metal tracks are measured". Greg Prato of AllMusic wrote that the song was what finally broke Judas Priest into the mainstream in the United States.

According to Steve Huey, also of AllMusic, "You've Got Another Thing Comin'" is the band's signature tune.

In 2012, Loudwire ranked the song number nine on its list of the 10 greatest Judas Priest songs, and in 2019, Louder Sound ranked the song number four on its list of the 50 greatest Judas Priest songs.

== In other media ==
The song shows up on several video games, for example, it is featured on the jukebox of the first level of Prey; in Grand Theft Auto: Vice City's radio station V-Rock; as downloadable content for Rock Band series (alongside the rest of the 1982 album Screaming for Vengeance), Rock Band Track Pack Volume 2; and a cover version is featured in Guitar Hero. It is also featured in 2K Sports' Major League Baseball 2K9 and EA Sports' NHL 12.

The original song is also featured in the 2011 comedy film, Bad Teacher.

The song was featured in a 2013 episode "Hell Bent for Leather" of Californication and in the 2020 season eleven episode "The Orpheus Gambit" of Archer.

The song is playing in Wayne Potts (Jeb Kreager)'s house in episode 5 "Illusions" of Mare of Easttown (2021). The song also plays in episode 7 of Pluribus.

== Personnel ==
- Rob Halford – vocals
- Glenn Tipton – lead guitar
- K. K. Downing – rhythm guitar
- Ian Hill – bass
- Dave Holland – drums

== Charts ==
Chart (1982)	Peak position
UK Singles (Official Charts)	66
US Billboard Hot 100	67
US Mainstream Rock Airplay (Billboard)	4
