= Freewheel Burning =

Single by Judas Priest

from the album Defenders of the Faith
- B-side: "Breaking the Law" (live)
- Released: 13 January 1984
- Recorded: 1983
- Studio: Ibiza Sound (Ibiza, Spain)
- Genre: Heavy metal, speed metal
- Length: 4:57
- Label: Columbia
- Songwriters: Rob Halford; K. K. Downing; Glenn Tipton
- Producer: Tom Allom

Judas Priest singles chronology
"Electric Eye" (1982)	"Freewheel Burning" (1984)	"Love Bites" (1984)

Music video
- "Freewheel Burning" on YouTube

"Freewheel Burning" is a song by the English heavy metal band Judas Priest, appearing on their 1984 album Defenders of the Faith, and released as the first single off that album. The 12" version of the single contained an extended guitar intro that was omitted on the full-length release.

The B-sides of this single are live versions of "Breaking the Law" and "You've Got Another Thing Comin'" recorded at the US Festival from Glen Helen Park, near Devore, San Bernardino in California on 29 May 1983 in front of an audience of approximately 375,000 people. The version of "Breaking the Law" is also the first official version released to feature K.K. Downing's added live guitar solo.

The music video contains footage of the band playing while a boy is playing the arcade game Pole Position over which Rob Halford's face is superimposed.

== Reception ==
PopMatters said, "Tom Allom's production is incredibly dense, lending an already heavy song an added layer of darkness. The guitar tone is tar thick, yet sleek, Holland's robotic drumming — a far cry from the unhinged speed of Metallica and Slayer that same year — cold and impersonal, while Halford's vocals are over the top, screaming, screeching, spitting out lines like bullets."

Loudwire noted the, "savage twin guitar riff, thunderous drum beat and falsetto-emblazoned vocals". Blabbermouth said, "There's still magic listening to Rob Halford blitz his way through those tongue twisters".

== Cover versions ==
A cover version of this song was released by band Fozzy on their 2002 album, Happenstance.

== Personnel ==
- Rob Halford – vocals
- Glenn Tipton – lead guitar
- K. K. Downing – rhythm guitar
- Ian Hill – bass
- Dave Holland – drums

== Charts ==
Chart (1984)	Peak position
French Singles (SNEP)	65
UK Singles (Official Charts)	42
