= Electric Eye (song) =

Promotional single by Judas Priest

from the album Screaming for Vengeance
- Released: 1982
- Recorded: 1982
- Genre: Heavy metal
- Length: 3:39
- Label: Columbia
- Songwriter(s): Rob Halford; K. K. Downing; Glenn Tipton
- Producer(s): Tom Allom

Judas Priest singles chronology
"(Take These) Chains" (1982)	"Electric Eye" (1982)	"Freewheel Burning" (1983)

"Electric Eye" is the second song on English heavy metal band Judas Priest’s 1982 album Screaming for Vengeance. It has become a staple at concerts, usually played as the first song. AllMusic critic Steve Huey called the song a classic.

== Background ==
Musically, the song is in the key of E minor, and its guitar solo is played by Glenn Tipton.

"Electric Eye" is an allusion to the book Nineteen Eighty-Four by George Orwell, in the use of the name of the pseudo-omniscient camera that watches over the community at all times. In this dystopia, the form of government, Ingsoc (Newspeak for English Socialism), is utterly totalitarian, and if citizens are caught rebelling in any manner, they "disappear". In the song by Judas Priest, however, the cameras are updated to take the form of a powerful satellite, that is "elected," to take "pictures that can prove," and "keep the country clean". Thus, the song has been called "prescient" for its depiction of a modern surveillance state, operating within the context of an ostensibly democratic nation.

== Personnel ==
- Rob Halford – vocals
- Glenn Tipton – lead guitar
- K. K. Downing – rhythm guitar
- Ian Hill – bass
- Dave Holland – drums

== Charts ==
Chart (1983)	Peak position
US Mainstream Rock (Billboard)	38

== See also ==
- Mass surveillance
- New World Order (conspiracy theory)
