= Breaking the Law =

1980 single by Judas Priest

Single by Judas Priest

from the album British Steel
- B-side: "Metal Gods"
- Released: 30 May 1980
- Recorded: January–February 1980
- Studio: Startling, Ascot, England
- Genre: Heavy metal
- Length: 2:35
- Label: Columbia
- Songwriters: Rob Halford; K. K. Downing; Glenn Tipton
- Producer: Tom Allom

Judas Priest singles chronology
"Living After Midnight" (1980)	"Breaking the Law" (1980)	"United" (1980)

Music video
- "Breaking the Law" on YouTube

"Breaking the Law" is a song by the English heavy metal band Judas Priest, originally released on their 1980 album British Steel. The song is one of the band's better known singles, and is readily recognised by its opening guitar riff.

== Composition ==
Prior to releasing 1980's British Steel, Judas Priest had been making moves toward streamlining their music into a simpler, less processed sound. That approach came to full fruition on British Steel. "Breaking the Law" combines a recognisable minor-key opening riff and a rhythmic chorus as its main hooks. There is a change-up on the mostly instrumental bridge, a new chord progression with Rob Halford shouting "You don't know what it's like!" before the sound effect of a police car's siren leads back into the main riff. More recent live performances of the song have featured a short solo by K. K. Downing over the bridge. The outro of the song is the main riff played repeatedly with Halford singing the chorus and Downing playing power chords.

Example of a typical heavy metal harmonic progression i–VI–VII Aeolian (Am–F–G): the main riff of Judas Priest's "Breaking the Law". MIDI sample

The song features some sound effects, including the sound of breaking glass and a police siren. The band were recording British Steel at Tittenhurst Park, which was the home of the Beatles's drummer Ringo Starr. For the breaking glass effect, the band used milk bottles that a milkman brought them in the morning, and the police siren was actually guitarist K. K. Downing using the tremolo arm on his Stratocaster.

Halford later said, "It was a time in the U.K. when there was a lot of strife-a lot of government strife, the miners were on strike, the car unions were on strike, there were street riots. It was a terrible time. That was the incentive for me to write a lyric to try to connect with that feeling that was out there."

== Music video ==
Directed by Julien Temple, the video starts with vocalist Rob Halford singing from the back of a 1974 Cadillac Fleetwood Eldorado convertible. Halford meets with two men dressed as priests carrying guitar cases and they enter the bank together. For the breaking the law chorus the two men remove their disguises and are revealed to be guitarists K. K. Downing and Glenn Tipton. They are then joined by bassist Ian Hill and drummer Dave Holland. The people in the bank are apparently incapacitated by the loudness of the guitars. Meanwhile, the security guard (who has only just awoken) watches on in amazement on the CCTV screens. The band breaks into the safe (with Halford showing "extraordinary" strength in pulling apart the iron bars). Halford takes from the safe a golden record award for the British Steel album (the music video was shot before the album went platinum). They quickly exit the bank with the record and drive away. Judas Priest concert footage now appears on the CCTV screens, and the security guard is seen miming along with a fake guitar (it was supposed to be a copy of Downing's Gibson Flying V, but the body was mistakenly placed on backwards), completely immersed in the music. The video concludes with the full band driving back along the A40, repeating the chorus until the song ends.

Downing later said, "I have to chuckle to myself really about how they got us to do whatever it was we were doing. But we were young and it was exciting and we were making probably the first ever heavy metal conceptual video. It reminds us that however big and powerful we were, we still did everything that people wanted us to do..."

== Performances ==
The song was covered with modified lyrics by American queercore band Pansy Division, with Pansy Division even performing the song live with Rob Halford on one occasion.

== Critical reception ==
The song made VH1's 40 Greatest Metal Songs at No. 40. In 2009 it was named the 12th greatest hard rock song of all time by VH1.

PopMatters said the song "opens with one of the most famous riffs in metal history, wasting no time getting into listeners' heads.'"

Rolling Stone ranked the song number four on their list of the 100 Greatest Heavy Metal Songs.

AllMusic wrote: "Its dramatically dark explanation of one person's decision to commit crime [...] and Rob Halford's deep, passionate growl made "Breaking the Law" a favorite in the early Priest catalog."

== Personnel ==
- Rob Halford – vocals
- K. K. Downing – guitars
- Glenn Tipton – guitars
- Ian Hill – bass
- Dave Holland – drums

== Charts ==
Chart (1980)	Peak position
Ireland (IRMA)	19
UK Singles (Official Charts)	12

== Certifications ==
Region	Certification	Certified units/sales
United Kingdom (BPI)	Silver	200,000^{‡}
^{‡} Sales+streaming figures based on certification alone.
