= Blizzard of Ozz Tour =

1980–1981 concert tour by Ozzy Osbourne

- Promotional tour by Ozzy Osbourne
- Poster to the concert in Toronto, Canada
- Location: Europe; North America
- Associated album: Blizzard of Ozz
- Start date: 12 September 1980
- End date: 13 September 1981
- Legs: 4
- No. of shows: 131

Ozzy Osbourne concert chronology
- Blizzard of Ozz Tour (1980–1981); Diary of a Madman Tour (1981–1982)

The Blizzard of Ozz Tour was the debut concert tour as a solo artist by English heavy metal singer Ozzy Osbourne, who had been fired from the English group Black Sabbath a year prior. The tour started on 12 September 1980 and concluded on 13 September 1981.

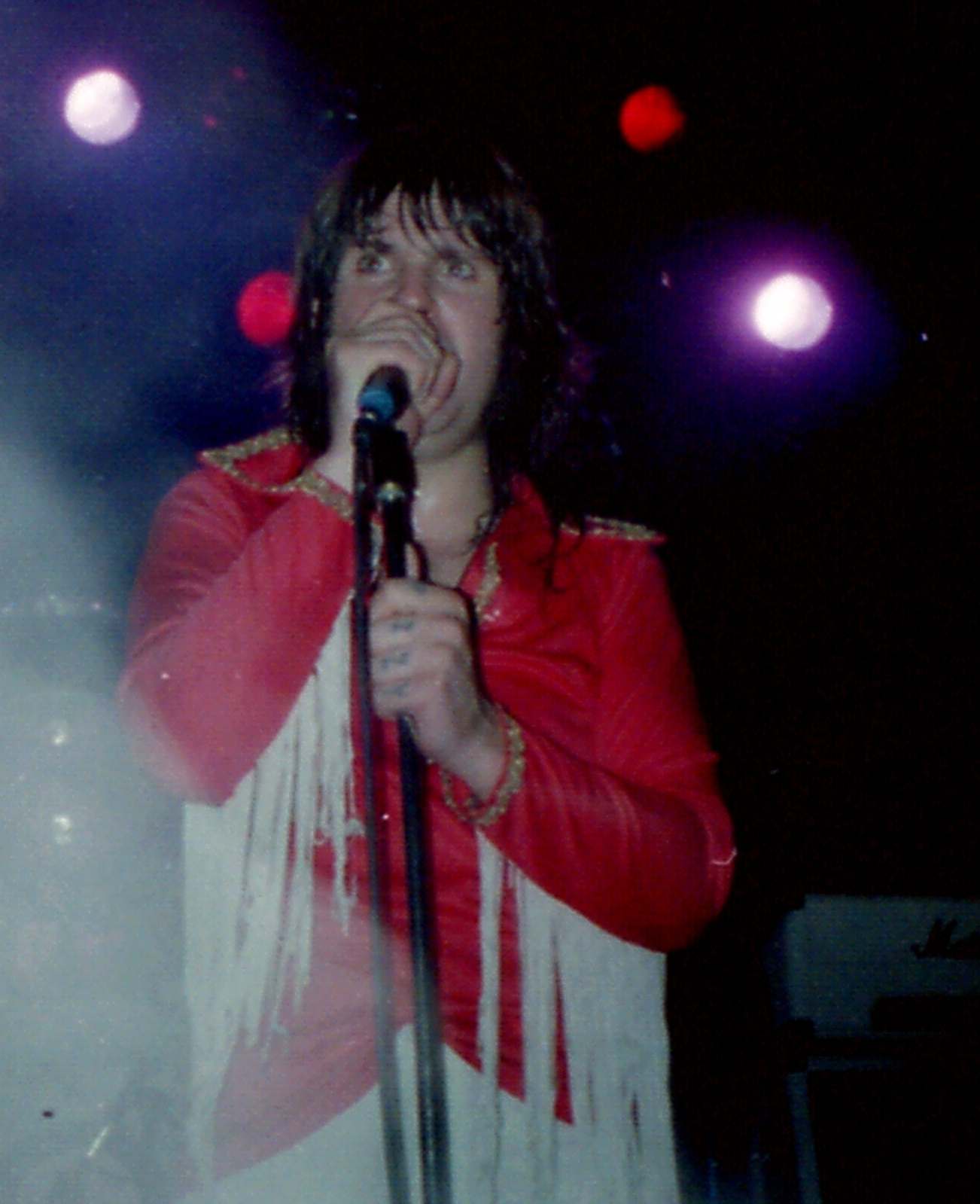
Ozzy Osbourne performing in Cardiff during the Blizzard of Ozz Tour in October 1980

== Overview ==
=== Background ===
Ozzy Osbourne was fired from Black Sabbath on 27 April 1979. Former Rainbow bassist Bob Daisley was hired on 14 November, with guitarist Randy Rhoads from Quiet Riot following shortly after. The first song that Ozzy, Rhoads, and Daisley wrote together was "Goodbye to Romance." Former-Uriah Heep drummer Lee Kerslake was hired in March 1980. The band then went to Ridge Farm Studios in Rusper to record the debut album, Blizzard of Ozz, from 22 March to 19 April 1980.

=== Europe leg ===
In August 1980, the band began rehearsing at Shepperton Studios in Shepperton, England for the "Blizzard of Ozz Tour." Don Airey, who had been hired to perform keyboards and synthesizers on "Mr. Crowley", "Goodbye to Romance" and "Revelation Mother Earth", could not tour with Ozzy since he had already signed a contract to tour with Rainbow, so the band hired Lindsay Bridgwater. The band performed two secret warm-up gigs billed as "The Law" in September at Norbreck Castle Nightclub in Blackpool on 3 September and at West Runton Pavilion on 5 September. The band kicked off its opening night of the tour in front of a sold-out crowd at the Glasgow Apollo on 12 September.

The 70s Welsh heavy metal band Budgie would open for Ozzy throughout the 1980 European leg. On 20 September, Blizzard of Ozz was released in the United Kingdom and was a success. "Crazy Train" and "Mr Crowley" were released as singles. "Goodbye to Romance", "I Don't Know" and "Suicide Solution" also received radio airplay. On 2 October, the band played at The Gamount Theatre in Southampton where the recordings of "Goodbye to Romance" and "No Bone Movies" would appear on the live Tribute album, released on 19 March 1987. The live recordings of "Mr. Crowley" and "Suicide Solution" would be released on the Mr. Crowley Live EP.

The band regrouped back at Ridge Farm to record Diary of a Madman between February and March 1981. Tensions between Ozzy/Sharon and Daisley/Kerslake over contract issues regarding their names, money, credit, and royalties got worse, which led to Sharon firing Daisley and Kerslake in March 1981. Ozzy, Sharon and Rhoads went back to the United States to look for a new drummer and bassist.

=== North America leg ===
In March 1981, former-Black Oak Arkansas, Pat Travers and Gary Moore drummer, Tommy Aldridge, and former-Quiet Riot bassist, Rudy Sarzo, were hired. Blizzard of Ozz was released in the United States and Canada on 27 March 1981 and it became a success. "Crazy Train" and "Mr. Crowley" were released as singles and "Goodbye to Romance", "I Don't Know" and "Suicide Solution" received radio airplay. The album eventually went platinum.

In April, the band began rehearsals for the North America leg at Swing Auditorium in San Bernardino, California. On 22 April, the band kicked off the North America leg of the tour at Towson Arena in Towson, Maryland in front of a sold-out crowd. Throughout the first half of the North American leg of the tour, the band was supported by English heavy metal band Motörhead. Other bands would be added, such as The Joe Perry Project, The Outlaws and Mountain. On 28 April, the band went to Channel 31(WUHF) TV Studios in Rochester, New York to film a live performance of "I Don't Know", "Suicide Solution", "Mr. Crowley" and "Crazy Train", which were broadcast on the After Hours TV show as live promo-videos.

On 11 May, the live recording of the Cleveland Music Hall performance was broadcast live over the local rock radio station, later released as the first 13 tracks on the live Tribute album. On 4 July, the band performed as the special guests in front of their biggest crowd at Bill Graham's Day on the Green Festival where they were supported by "415" (the opener) and Loverboy while Pat Travers, Blue Öyster Cult and Heart performed afterwards.

On 28 July the Montreal performance was recorded live and broadcast on the "King Biscuit Flower Hour" radio show. The guitar solo from the song "Suicide Solution" from this performance was dubbed into the Cleveland recording of "Suicide Solution" for the Tribute album. "Flying High Again" and "I Don't Know" from the Montreal performance were included on the bonus album Ozzy Live for the 2011 Diary Of A Madman Deluxe 30th Anniversary Legacy Edition album release. The band went back to England to perform at Vale Park in Burslem, Stoke for the "Heavy Metal Holocaust Festival." The band went back to finish the Blizzard of Ozz Tour in the United States with English hard rock band Def Leppard. The band ended the tour at Peabody Auditorium in Daytona Beach, Florida on 13 September 1981.

== Personnel ==
Europe

- Ozzy Osbourne – vocals
- Randy Rhoads – guitar
- Bob Daisley – bass
- Lee Kerslake – drums
- Lindsay Bridgwater – keyboards

North America

- Ozzy Osbourne – vocals
- Randy Rhoads – guitar
- Rudy Sarzo – bass
- Tommy Aldridge – drums
- Lindsay Bridgwater – keyboards

== Setlists ==
Europe

"O Fortuna" (Carl Orff song) [Audio introduction]

1. "I Don't Know"
2. "You Lookin' at Me Lookin' at You"
3. "Crazy Train"
4. "Goodbye to Romance"
5. "No Bone Movies"
6. "Mr Crowley"
7. "Revelation Mother Earth"
8. "Suicide Solution"
9. Randy Rhoads guitar solo
10. Lee Kerslake drum solo
11. "Iron Man" (Black Sabbath cover)
12. "Children of the Grave" (Black Sabbath cover)
13. "Steal Away the Night"
14. "Paranoid" (Black Sabbath cover) [encore]

North America

"O Fortuna" ("Carl Orff" Song) [Audio Intro]

1. "I Don't Know"
2. "Crazy Train"
3. "Believer"
4. "Mr Crowley"
5. "Flying High Again"
6. "Revelation Mother Earth"
7. "Steal Away the Night"
8. Tommy Aldridge drum solo
9. "No Bone Movies"
10. "Suicide Solution" [and "Randy Rhoads guitar solo]
11. "Iron Man" (Black Sabbath cover)
12. "Children of the Grave" (Black Sabbath cover)
13. "Paranoid" (Black Sabbath cover) [encore]

== Tour dates ==
Date	City	Country	Venue
Europe
~~14 August 1980~~	~~Edinburgh 8Michelle~~	~~Scotland~~	~~Edinburgh Nite Club~~
~~15 August 1980~~	~~Newcastle~~	~~England~~	~~Mayfair Ballroom~~
~~19 August 1980~~	~~Manchester~~	~~England~~	~~Rotter's Nightclub~~
~~24 August 1980~~	~~Reading~~	~~England~~	~~Little John's Farm (Reading Rock Festival)~~
Secret warm-up gigs (Billed as "The Law")
3 September 1980	Blackpool	England	Norbreck Castle Nightclub
5 September 1980	West Runton	England	West Runton Pavilion
Europe
12 September 1980	Glasgow	Scotland	Glasgow Apollo (live premiere)
13 September 1980	Dundee	Scotland	Caird Hall
15 September 1980	Edinburgh	Scotland	Edinburgh Odeon
17 September 1980	Newcastle	England	Newcastle City Hall
18 September 1980	Bradford	England	St George's Hall
20 September 1980	London	England	Hammersmith Odeon
21 September 1980	London	England	Hammersmith Odeon
23 September 1980	Manchester	England	Manchester Apollo
24 September 1980	Coventry	England	Coventry Theatre
26 September 1980	Liverpool	England	Royal Court Theatre
28 September 1980	Birmingham	England	Birmingham Odeon
29 September 1980	Leicester	England	De Montfort Hall
1 October 1980	Oxford	England	New Theatre Oxford
2 October 1980	Southampton	England	Southampton Gaumont Theatre ("Mr Crowley Live EP") ("Goodbye to Romance" and "No Bone Movies" – Tribute)
3 October 1980	Stoke	England	King's Hall
5 October 1980	Derby	England	Assembly Rooms
6 October 1980	Blackburn	England	King George's Hall
7 October 1980	Sheffield	England	Sheffield City Hall
9 October 1980	Cardiff	Wales	Sophia Gardens Pavilion
10 October 1980	Taunton	England	Taunton Odeon Theatre
11 October 1980	Poole	England	Poole Arts Centre
13 October 1980	Malvern	England	Malvern Winter Gardens
~~14 October 1980~~	~~Brighton~~	England	~~Brighton Dome~~
16 October 1980	Wolverhampton	England	Wolverhampton Civic Hall
17 October 1980	Newcastle	England	Mayfair Ballroom
18 October 1980	Hull	England	Hull City Hall
20 October 1980	Bristol	England	Colston Hall
~~21 October 1980~~	~~Canterbury~~	England	~~Canterbury Odeon~~
22 October 1980	Chelmsford	England	Chelmsford Odeon
23 October 1980	Ipswich	England	Ipswich Gaumont Theatre
24 October 1980	St. Albans	England	St. Albans City Hall
26 October 1980	London	England	Hammersmith Odeon
28 October 1980	Sunderland	England	Mayfair Theatre
29 October 1980	Middlesbrough	England	Middlesbrough Town Hall
31 October 1980	Brighton	England	Brighton Dome
1 November 1980	Canterbury	England	Canterbury Odeon Theatre (Bob Daisley and Lee Kerslake's last show)
~~8 November 1980~~	~~Nottingham~~	England	~~The Boat Club~~
North America
22 April 1981	Towson	United States	Towson Center (First show billed as "Ozzy Osbourne") (Rudy Sarzo and Tommy Aldridge's first show)
23 April 1981	Harrisburg	United States	Harrisburg Forum
24 April 1981	Passaic	United States	Capitol Theatre
25 April 1981	Upper Darby Township	United States	Tower Theater
26 April 1981	Bethlehem	United States	Stabler Arena
28 April 1981	Rochester	United States	WUHF-TV
29 April 1981	Rochester	United States	Rochester Auditorium
30 April 1981	Syracuse	United States	Landmark Theatre
1 May 1981	Boston	United States	Orpheum Theatre
2 May 1981	New York City	United States	Palladium (Two shows)
3 May 1981	Poughkeepsie	United States	Mid-Hudson Civic Center
4 May 1981	Springfield	United States	Springfield Civic Center
6 May 1981	Buffalo	United States	Shea's Buffalo Theater
8 May 1981	Johnstown	United States	Cambria County War Memorial Arena
9 May 1981	Trotwood	United States	Hara Arena
10 May 1981	Toledo	United States	Toledo Sports Arena
11 May 1981	Cleveland	United States	Cleveland Music Hall (First 13 tracks of Tribute)
~~12 May 1981~~	~~Erie~~	United States	~~Erie County Field House~~
13 May 1981	Columbus	United States	Columbus Veterans Memorial Auditorium
15 May 1981	Louisville	United States	Louisville Gardens
~~16 May 1981~~	~~Saginaw~~	United States	~~Wendler Arena~~
~~18 May 1981~~	~~Indianapolis~~	United States	~~Indianapolis Convention Center~~
19 May 1981	Detroit	United States	Detroit Masonic Temple
20 May 1981	Milwaukee	United States	Riverside Theater
22 May 1981	St. Louis	United States	Checkerdome
23 May 1981	Rockford	United States	Rockford Metro Center
24 May 1981	Chicago	United States	Aragon Ballroom
25 May 1981	Minneapolis	United States	East River Flats Park (River Flats Jam)
28 May 1981	Omaha	United States	Omaha Music Hall
30 May 1981	Tulsa	United States	Brady Theater
31 May 1981	Austin	United States	Austin Municipal Auditorium
2 June 1981	Kansas City	United States	Memorial Hall
4 June 1981	San Antonio	United States	San Antonio Convention Center
5 June 1981	Fort Worth	United States	Will Rogers Memorial Coliseum
6 June 1981	Beaumont	United States	Fair Park Coliseum
7 June 1981	Houston	United States	Sam Houston Coliseum
North America
18 June 1981	Denver	United States	Rainbow Music Hall
19 June 1981	Colorado Springs	United States	Colorado Springs City Auditorium
21 June 1981	El Paso	United States	El Paso County Coliseum
23 June 1981	Tucson	United States	Tucson Community Center
~~24 June 1981~~	~~Phoenix~~	United States	~~Arizona Veterans Memorial Coliseum~~
25 June 1981	Las Vegas	United States	Aladdin Theatre
26 June 1981	San Diego	United States	Fox Theater
27 June 1981	Long Beach	United States	Long Beach Arena
28 June 1981	Tempe	United States	ASU Activity Center
~~30 June 1981~~	~~Fresno~~	United States	~~Selland Arena~~
2 July 1981	San Bernardino	United States	Swing Auditorium
3 July 1981	Bakersfield	United States	Kern County Fairgrounds
4 July 1981	Oakland	United States	Oakland Coliseum (Day on the Green)
5 July 1981	Santa Cruz	United States	Santa Cruz Civic Auditorium
~~6 July 1981~~	~~Reno~~	United States	~~Washoe County Fairgrounds Pavilion~~
~~7 July 1981~~	~~Redding~~	United States	~~Redding Civic Auditorium~~
~~9 July 1981~~	~~Eugene~~	United States	~~McArthur Court~~
~~10 July 1981~~	~~Yakima~~	United States	~~Yakima Speedway~~
11 July 1981	Portland	United States	Paramount Theatre
12 July 1981	Seattle	United States	Paramount Theatre
14 July 1981	Victoria	Canada	Victoria Memorial Arena
15 July 1981	Vancouver	Canada	Kerrisdale Arena
17 July 1981	Edmonton	Canada	Kinsmen Field House
18 July 1981	Calgary	Canada	Max Bell Centre
20 July 1981	Winnipeg	Canada	Winnipeg Arena
23 July 1981	Kitchener	Canada	Raffi Armenian Theatre
24 July 1981	London	Canada	London Gardens
25 July 1981	Hamilton	Canada	Hamilton Place Theatre
26 July 1981	Kingston	Canada	Jock Hardy Arena
27 July 1981	Toronto	Canada	Maple Leaf Gardens
28 July 1981	Montreal	Canada	Théâtre Saint-Denis
~~29 July 1981~~	~~Ottawa~~	Canada	~~Ottawa Civic Center~~
Heavy Metal Holocaust
1 August 1981	Burslem	England	Vale Park
North America
2 August 1981	New Haven	United States	New Haven Coliseum
4 August 1981	Glens Falls	United States	Glens Falls Civic Center
5 August 1981	Portland	United States	Cumberland County Civic Center
6 August 1981	Bangor	United States	Bangor Auditorium
7 August 1981	Providence	United States	Ocean State Theater
8 August 1981	South Fallsburg	United States	Music Mountain Theater
9 August 1981	South Yarmouth	United States	Cape Cod Coliseum
11 August 1981	Pittsburgh	United States	Stanley Theatre
12 August 1981	Utica	United States	Utica Memorial Auditorium
~~13 August 1981~~	~~Binghamton~~	United States	~~Broome County Veterans Memorial Arena~~
14 August 1981	Hempstead	United States	Nassau Coliseum
15 August 1981	Asbury Park	United States	Asbury Park Convention Hall
16 August 1981	Columbia	United States	Merriweather Post Pavilion
18 August 1981	Norfolk	United States	Premier Theater
~~19 August 1981~~	~~Roanoke~~	United States	~~Roanoke Civic Center~~
21 August 1981	Evansville	United States	Mesker Music Theater
22 August 1981	Hoffman Estates	United States	Poplar Creek Music Theater
23 August 1981	East Troy	United States	Alpine Valley Music Theatre
24 August 1981	Ashwaubenon	United States	Brown County Veterans Memorial Arena
25 August 1981	Davenport	United States	Palmer Alumni Auditorium
27 August 1981	Fort Wayne	United States	Foellinger Theater
28 August 1981	Indianapolis	United States	Hilbert Circle Theatre
29 August 1981	South Bend	United States	Morris Civic Auditorium
30 August 1981	Grand Rapids	United States	Welsh Auditorium
31 August 1981	Clarkston	United States	Pine Knob Music Theatre
2 September 1981	Springfield	United States	Prairie Capital Convention Center
3 September 1981	Memphis	United States	Orpheum Theatre
4 September 1981	Atlanta	United States	Fox Theatre
5 September 1981	Fayetteville	United States	Cumberland County Memorial Arena
~~6 September 1981~~	~~Charlotte~~	United States	~~Charlotte Park Center~~
8 September 1981	Columbus	United States	Municipal Auditorium
9 September 1981	Tampa	United States	Curtis Hixon Hall
10 September 1981	Fort Pierce	United States	St. Lucie County Civic Center
11 September 1981	Sunrise	United States	Sunrise Musical Theater
12 September 1981	Sunrise	United States	Sunrise Musical Theater
13 September 1981	Daytona Beach	United States	Peabody Auditorium
