= Best of Ozz =

Compilation album by Ozzy Osbourne
- Released: 1 March 1989
- Recorded: 1980–1985
- Studios: Ridge Farm Studio (Rusper, West Sussex); Townhouse Studios (London); AIR Studios (London, UK); Studio Davout (Paris, France)
- Genres: Heavy metal; hard rock; glam metal
- Length: 48:15
- Label: CBS/Sony
- Producers: Ozzy Osbourne; Randy Rhoads; Bob Daisley; Lee Kerslake; Max Norman; Ron Nevison

Ozzy Osbourne chronology
No Rest for the Wicked (1988)	Best of Ozz (1989)	Ten Commandments (1990)

Best of Ozz is a compilation album by English heavy metal singer Ozzy Osbourne. Released on 1 March 1989 by CBS/Sony in Japan only, it features songs from Osbourne's first four studio albums, ranging from 1980's Blizzard of Ozz to 1986's The Ultimate Sin.

== Background ==
Best of Ozz is a ten-track compilation featuring three tracks from Blizzard of Ozz, two tracks from Diary of a Madman, two tracks from Bark at the Moon and three tracks from The Ultimate Sin. Amongst the tracks included are six singles, including "Crazy Train", "Over the Mountain" and "Bark at the Moon".

== Reception ==
Music website AllMusic awarded Best of Ozz three out of five stars; reviewer James Christopher Monger praised the album as "one of the better collections out there" due to the high quality of the original albums from which the songs are taken. Noting that the release only features ten tracks, Monger concluded by describing Best of Ozz as "a nice little sampler of Osbourne's early post-Sabbath career".

== Track listing ==
No.	Title	Writer(s)	Length
1.	"Over the Mountain"	Ozzy Osbourne; Randy Rhoads; Bob Daisley; Lee Kerslake	4:32
2.	"Secret Loser"	Osbourne; Jake E. Lee	4:11
3.	"Goodbye to Romance"	Osbourne; Rhoads; Daisley	5:35
4.	"Shot in the Dark"	Osbourne; Phil Soussan	4:28
5.	"Mr. Crowley"	Osbourne; Rhoads; Daisley	4:59
6.	"Bark at the Moon"	Osbourne	4:16
7.	"Crazy Train"	Osbourne; Rhoads; Daisley	4:51
8.	"Centre of Eternity"	Osbourne	5:23
9.	"Diary of a Madman"	Osbourne; Rhoads; Daisley; Kerslake	6:15
10.	"The Ultimate Sin"	Osbourne; Lee	3:45
Total length:			48:15

Notes

- Tracks 1 and 9 were originally featured on Diary of a Madman.
- Tracks 2, 4 and 10 were originally featured on The Ultimate Sin.
- Tracks 3, 5 and 7 were originally featured on Blizzard of Ozz.
- Tracks 6 and 8 were originally featured on Bark at the Moon.

== Personnel ==
- Ozzy Osbourne – vocals (all tracks), production (tracks 1, 3 and 5–9)
- Randy Rhoads – guitars and production (tracks 1, 3, 5, 7 and 9)
- Bob Daisley – bass and backing vocals (tracks 1, 3 and 5–9), production (tracks 3 and 5–8)
- Lee Kerslake – drums and percussion (tracks 1, 3, 5, 7 and 9), production (tracks 3, 5 and 7)
- Jake E. Lee – guitars and backing vocals (tracks 2, 4, 6, 8 and 10)
- Phil Soussan – bass (tracks 2, 4 and 10)
- Randy Castillo – drums (tracks 2, 4 and 10)
- Don Airey – keyboards (tracks 3 and 5–8)
- Mike Moran – keyboards (tracks 2, 4 and 10)
- Max Norman – engineering (tracks 1, 3 and 5–9), production (tracks 1, 6, 8 and 9)
- Ron Nevison – production and engineering (tracks 2, 4 and 10)
- Tony Bongiovi – mixing (tracks 6 and 8)
- Tim Young – mastering (tracks 1, 3, 5, 7 and 9)
- Howie Weinberg – mastering (tracks 6 and 8)
