= Ten Commandments (Ozzy Osbourne album) =

Compilation album by Ozzy Osbourne
- Released: 1990
- Recorded: 1980–1985
- Studio: Ridge Farm Studio (Rusper, West Sussex); Townhouse Studios (London); AIR Studios (London); Studio Davout (Paris)
- Genre: Heavy metal; glam metal; hard rock
- Length: 47:29
- Label: Priority; CBS
- Producer: Ozzy Osbourne; Randy Rhoads; Bob Daisley; Lee Kerslake; Max Norman; Ron Nevison

Ozzy Osbourne chronology
Best of Ozz (1989)	Ten Commandments (1990)	Just Say Ozzy (1990)

Ten Commandments is a compilation album by English heavy metal singer Ozzy Osbourne. Released in 1990 by Priority Records and CBS Records, it contains songs from Osbourne's first four studio albums, ranging from Blizzard of Ozz (1980) to The Ultimate Sin (1986).

== Background ==
Ten Commandments is a ten-track compilation from Osbourne's first couple of albums after leaving Black Sabbath – two tracks from his debut album Blizzard of Ozz, four from his second album Diary of a Madman, two from his third album Bark at the Moon, and two from The Ultimate Sin. Among the tracks included are five singles, including "Crazy Train", "Flying High Again" and "Bark at the Moon".

This release is out of print. A purported reason is that this release was pulled from the shelves at music stores due to the religious right protesting the title of "Ten Commandments". Another theory is that this CD was compiled without Osbourne's consent and was ordered off shelves and returned to the record company.

== Reception ==
Music website AllMusic awarded Ten Commandments four out of five stars. Stephen Thomas Erlewine praised the album as "an excellent summation of Osbourne's career", describing it as "almost everything a casual fan would need from Ozzy's prime" due to the inclusion of many of the singer's "staples".

== Track listing ==
No.	Title	Writer(s)	Length
1.	"Flying High Again"	Ozzy Osbourne; Randy Rhoads; Bob Daisley; Lee Kerslake	4:50
2.	"Crazy Train"	Osbourne; Rhoads; Daisley	4:50
3.	"Diary of a Madman"	Osbourne; Rhoads; Daisley; Kerslake	6:12
4.	"Shot in the Dark"	Osbourne; Phil Soussan	4:16
5.	"Thank God for the Bomb"	Osbourne; Jake E. Lee	3:53
6.	"Bark at the Moon"	Osbourne	4:15
7.	"Tonight"	Osbourne; Rhoads; Daisley; Kerslake	5:50
8.	"Little Dolls"	Osbourne; Rhoads; Daisley; Kerslake	5:38
9.	"Steal Away (The Night)"	Osbourne; Rhoads; Daisley; Kerslake	3:28
10.	"So Tired"	Osbourne	3:56
Total length:			47:29

Notes

- Tracks 1, 3, 7 and 8 originally appeared on Diary of a Madman.
- Tracks 2 and 9 originally appeared on Blizzard of Ozz.
- Tracks 4 and 5 originally appeared on The Ultimate Sin.
- Tracks 6 and 10 originally appeared on Bark at the Moon.

== Personnel ==
- Ozzy Osbourne – vocals (all tracks), production (tracks 1–3 and 6–10)
- Randy Rhoads – guitars and production (tracks 1–3 and 7–9)
- Bob Daisley – bass guitar and backing vocals (tracks 1–3 and 6–10), production (tracks 2, 6, 9 and 10)
- Lee Kerslake – drums and percussion (tracks 1–3 and 7–9), production (tracks 2 and 9)
- Jake E. Lee – guitars and backing vocals (tracks 4–6 and 10)
- Phil Soussan – bass guitar (tracks 4 and 5)
- Randy Castillo – drums (tracks 4 and 5)
- Don Airey – keyboards (2, 6, 9 and 10)
- Mike Moran – keyboards (tracks 4 and 5)
- Max Norman – engineering (tracks 1–3 and 6–10), production (1, 3, 6–8 and 10)
- Ron Nevison – production and engineering (tracks 4 and 5)
- Tony Bongiovi – mixing (tracks 6 and 10)
- Tim Young – mastering (tracks 1–3 and 7–9)
- Howie Weinberg – mastering (tracks 6 and 10)
