= Tribute (Ozzy Osbourne album) =

Live album by Ozzy Osbourne
- Released: 16 April 1987
- Recorded: 1980–1981
- Genre: Heavy metal
- Length: 70:28
- Labels: Epic; CBS
- Producers: Max Norman; Ozzy Osbourne

Ozzy Osbourne chronology
The Ultimate Sin (1986)	Tribute (1987)	No Rest for the Wicked (1988)

Singles from Tribute
- 1. "Crazy Train" Released: 22 June 1987

Professional ratings
Review scores
Source	Rating
AllMusic	4.5/5 stars
Martin Popoff	7/10 stars
Rolling Stone	(favorable)

Tribute is a live album by British heavy metal singer Ozzy Osbourne, featuring guitarist Randy Rhoads, in whose honour the album was released. The album was released on 16 April 1987 in the US and 5 May 1987 in the UK, five years after the death of Rhoads, then it was reissued on 22 August 1995, and again remastered and reissued in 2002. It peaked at number 6 on the US Billboard 200 chart.

== Background ==
The album was released in memory of Randy Rhoads, guitarist for Osbourne's band between 1979 and 1982 who died in a plane crash while on tour in Florida in 1982. The album also includes studio outtakes of Rhoads recording the classical-influenced acoustic guitar piece "Dee", which Rhoads wrote for his mother Delores and was originally included on Osbourne's debut solo album Blizzard of Ozz.

A live album consisting entirely of renditions of Black Sabbath songs was originally planned to be recorded at Toronto's Maple Leaf Gardens in mid-1982 with Rhoads. Rhoads and drummer Tommy Aldridge felt that they had established themselves as recording artists and an album of cover songs would be a step backwards artistically, and they refused to participate. Bassist Rudy Sarzo was uncomfortable with refusing to perform, not having the same recording pedigree of his bandmates, but he stood with them and the trio informed management of their decision. Plans for this proposed live album crumbled upon Rhoads' sudden death weeks later, though the plan was resurrected with the release of Speak of the Devil later that year with Sarzo and Aldridge joined by Night Ranger guitarist Brad Gillis.

== Overview ==
The majority of Tribute, from "I Don't Know" through to "Paranoid", was recorded live in Cleveland, Ohio on 11 May 1981. "Goodbye to Romance" and "No Bone Movies" are taken from an earlier English gig in support of the Blizzard of Ozz album, possibly from Southampton on 2 October 1980. These two tracks feature bassist Bob Daisley and drummer Lee Kerslake.

The versions of "Iron Man", "Children of the Grave", and "Paranoid" featured on Tribute were originally intended to be included on the 1982 live album Speak of the Devil. In the months following Rhoads' death, these three songs were intended to be released in tribute to the guitarist, but a record company decision was made to save them for a full album to be released at a later date.

The live recording of "Crazy Train" was released as the album's only single on 10 February 1987, along with an accompanying music video. The album's cover photo was taken at a performance in Rosemont, Illinois on 24 January 1982, by photographer Paul Natkin.

The operatic music which opens Tribute, as well as all of Osbourne's live shows of that era, is "O Fortuna" from the Carmina Burana scenic cantata by Carl Orff. When the album was remastered in 1995, the introduction was removed, shortening the opening track "I Don't Know" to 4:43. It was restored for the 2002 remaster.

== Track listing ==
All tracks are written by Ozzy Osbourne, Randy Rhoads and Bob Daisley, except where indicated.

Side one
No.	Title	Originally from	Length
1.	"I Don't Know"	Blizzard of Ozz (1980)	5:40
2.	"Crazy Train"	Blizzard of Ozz	5:19
3.	"Believer"	Diary of a Madman (1981)	5:08
4.	"Mr. Crowley"	Blizzard of Ozz	5:37

Side two
No.	Title	Writer(s)	Originally from	Length
1.	"Flying High Again"	Osbourne, Rhoads, Daisley, Lee Kerslake	Diary of a Madman	4:17
2.	"Revelation (Mother Earth)"		Blizzard of Ozz	5:58
3.	"Steal Away (The Night)"		Blizzard of Ozz	8:04

Side three
No.	Title	Writer(s)	Originally from	Length
1.	"Suicide Solution"		Blizzard of Ozz	7:46
2.	"Iron Man"	Osbourne, Tony Iommi, Geezer Butler, Bill Ward	Paranoid (1970)	2:50
3.	"Children of the Grave"	Osbourne, Iommi, Butler, Ward	Master of Reality (1971)	5:57
4.	"Paranoid"	Osbourne, Iommi, Butler, Ward	Paranoid	2:59

Side four
No.	Title	Writer(s)	Originally from	Length
1.	"Goodbye to Romance"		Blizzard of Ozz	5:33
2.	"No Bone Movies"	Osbourne, Rhoads, Daisley, Kerslake	Blizzard of Ozz	4:02
3.	"Dee" (Randy Rhoads studio outtakes)	Rhoads	Blizzard of Ozz	4:22

== Personnel ==
- Ozzy Osbourne - vocals, executive producer
- Randy Rhoads - guitar
- Rudy Sarzo - bass
- Tommy Aldridge - drums
- Lindsay Bridgwater - keyboards
- Bob Daisley - bass on "Goodbye to Romance" and "No Bone Movies"
- Lee Kerslake - drums on "Goodbye to Romance" and "No Bone Movies"

=== Production ===
- Max Norman - producer, engineer
- Brian Lee and Bob Ludwig - 1995 remastering
- Bruce Dickinson - 2002 edition executive producer
- Chris Athens - 2002 remastering

== Charts ==
=== Album ===
Chart (1987)	Peak position
Australian Albums (Kent Music Report)	46
Canada Top Albums/CDs (RPM)	17
European Albums Chart	22
Finnish Albums (The Official Finnish Charts)	13
German Albums (Offizielle Top 100)	41
New Zealand Albums (RMNZ)	36
Swedish Albums (Sverigetopplistan)	17
UK Albums (Official Charts)	13
US Billboard 200	6

=== Singles ===
Single	Chart (1987)	Peak position
"Crazy Train"	UK Singles Chart	99

== Certifications ==
Region	Certification	Certified units/sales
Australia (ARIA)	Gold	35,000^{‡}
Canada (Music Canada)	Gold	50,000^{^}
United States (RIAA)	2× Platinum	2,000,000^{^}
^{^} Shipments figures based on certification alone.^{‡} Sales+streaming figures based on certification alone.
