= Suicide in music subcultures =

Suicide in music subcultures refers to the relationship between members of a subculture of music fans and the act of suicide. Researchers have examined the relationship between heavy metal subculture, goth subculture, emo subculture, and opera characters and suicide.

== Goth subculture ==
A study published on the British Medical Journal concluded that "identification as belonging to the Goth subculture [at some point in their lives] was the best predictor of self harm and attempted suicide [among young teens]", and that it was most possibly due to a selection mechanism (persons that wanted to harm themselves later identified as goths, thus raising the percentage of those persons who identify as goths). According to The Guardian, some goth teens are at more likely to harm themselves or attempt suicide. A 2006 medical journal study of 1,300 Scottish schoolchildren in their teen years found that 53% of the goth teens had attempted to harm themselves and 47% had attempted suicide. The study found that the "correlation was stronger than any other predictor." The study was based on a sample of 15 teenagers who identified as goths, of which 8 had self-harmed by any method, 7 had self-harmed by cutting, scratching or scoring, and 7 had attempted suicide.

The authors held that most self-harm by teens was done before joining the subculture, and that joining the subculture would actually protect them and help them deal with distress in their lives. The authors insisted on the study being based on small numbers and on the need for replication to confirm the results. The study was criticized for using only a small sample of goth teens and not taking into account other influences and differences between types of goths; for taking a study from a larger number of people.

== See also ==
- "Suicide Solution" – 1980 heavy metal song by Ozzy Osbourne implicated in the death of a fan
