= Quiet Riot (1978 album) =

Studio album by Quiet Riot
- Released: March 2, 1978
- Recorded: 1977
- Studios: Wally Heider Studios, Hollywood, Los Angeles
- Genres: Hard rock; glam rock
- Length: 38:23
- Label: CBS Sony
- Producer: Derek Lawrence

Quiet Riot chronology
Quiet Riot (1978)	Quiet Riot II (1978)

Singles from Quiet Riot
- 1. "It's Not So Funny" Released: 1978

Professional ratings
Review scores
Source	Rating
Allmusic	1.5/5 stars

Quiet Riot is the debut studio album by American heavy metal band Quiet Riot. It was released exclusively in Japan on March 2, 1978. The album features guitarist Randy Rhoads, who later gained recognition for playing on Ozzy Osbourne's first two solo albums.

== Overview ==
Analyzing it decades later, music critic Martin Popoff said the album is more "glam pop" than heavy metal or hard rock, like in the band's 80s output.

The song "Back to the Coast" was originally written by Rhoads and his brother Kelle when they were teenagers. It was originally called "West Coast Tryouts".

"Back to the Coast" was re-recorded by Kelle Rhoads for his 1985 Cheap Talkin' Romance EP, which features Kelly Garni on bass and Steve Sunnarborg, a student of Randy Rhoads and winner of the Randy Rhoads Memorial Scholarship at CSUN, on guitar.

== Track listing ==
No.	Title	Writer(s)	Length
1.	"It's Not So Funny"	Kevin DuBrow; Randy Rhoads	3:22
2.	"Mama's Little Angels"	DuBrow; Drew Forsyth; Kelly Garni; R. Rhoads	3:04
3.	"Tin Soldier" (Small Faces cover)	Ronnie Lane; Steve Marriott	3:33
4.	"Ravers"	DuBrow; R. Rhoads	3:08
5.	"Back to the Coast"	Kelle Rhoads; R. Rhoads	2:49
6.	"Glad All Over" (Dave Clark Five cover)	Dave Clark; Mike Smith	3:09
7.	"Get Your Kicks"	DuBrow; R. Rhoads	2:49
8.	"Look in Any Window"	R. Rhoads	3:41
9.	"Just How You Want It"	DuBrow	2:45
10.	"Riot Reunion"	DuBrow; R. Rhoads	2:08
11.	"Fit to Be Tied"	DuBrow; R. Rhoads; Ron Sobol	3:27
12.	"Demolition Derby"	DuBrow; R. Rhoads	4:23

== Personnel ==
Quiet Riot

- Kevin DuBrow – lead vocals
- Randy Rhoads – guitars, backing vocals
- Kelly Garni – bass, backing vocals
- Drew Forsyth – drums, backing vocals

Production

- Derek Lawrence – production
- Warren Entner – production
- Peter Grant – engineering
