= Rusper Priory =

Priory of Benedictine nuns in England

Monastery information
- Full name: Priory of St Mary Magdalene of Rusper
- Established: before 1200
- Disestablished: 1537
- Dedication: St Mary Magdalene

People
- Founder: House of Braose

Site
- Location: Rusper, West Sussex, England
- Visible remains: None
- Public access: None

Rusper Priory was a priory of Benedictine nuns in West Sussex, England.

== History ==
William de Braose was the patron when the foundation was confirmed c.1200 by Seffrid II, Bishop of Chichester. The priory was probably for twelve nuns under a prioress. The priory received income from the churches of Warnham, Ifield, and Selham, to which John de Braose added that of Horsham in or before 1231.

The total income in 1291 was over £44. After the Black Death the priory declined. There were eight nuns in 1442, but only five in 1478. There were four nuns in 1521 and three in 1527. In 1535, the annual value of the priory was estimated by the Valor Ecclesiasticus at £39.

It was dissolved in 1537. At that time there were only one nun and the prioress, both very aged. They had two women servants.

The last prioress, Elizabeth Sydney, received a pension of 100s, and the one remaining sister a gift of 60s. (They were two of the three nuns who had professed on 8 August 1484.) The reversion of the priory's demesne estate was granted to Sir Robert Southwell and his wife Margaret. The medieval priory buildings were replaced by a building called The Nunnery, which was much altered in later centuries.

The present house occupying the site, although still called The Nunnery, was built in the nineteenth century.
