= Rock Super Bowl =

Rock festival in Orlando, Florida

The Rock Super Bowl, often written as Rock Superbowl, was a recurring rock festival held from 1977 to 1983 at the Tangerine Bowl in Orlando, Florida.

== Lineups ==
Artists are listed in billing order on posters and ticketing, with the headline act shown in bold.

Event	Date	Artists	Attendance	Notes
Rock Superbowl 1977	May 29, 1977	**Fleetwood Mac,** Bob Seger & the Silver Bullet Band, Chick Corea, Stanley Clarke & Return to Forever, Kenny Loggins	—	—
Rock Superbowl II	July 3, 1977	**The Eagles**, Hall & Oates, Jimmy Buffett	46,000	—
Rock Superbowl III	September 4, 1977	**Peter Frampton**, Kansas,The J. Geils Band, Rick Derringer	—	—
Rock Superbowl 1978	July 2, 1978	**Bob Seger & the Silver Bullet Band**, Foreigner, Bob Welch, Toby Beau	—	—
Rock Superbowl V	August 5, 1978	**Steve Miller Band**, Jimmy Buffett, Little River Band	—	—
Rock Superbowl 1979	May 27, 1979	**AC/DC,** The Doobie Brothers, Boston, Poco	—	—
Rock Superbowl VIII	April 5, 1980	**Bob Seger & the Silver Bullet Band**, Molly Hatchet, Nantucket	—	—
Rock Superbowl 1980	July 5, 1980	**ZZ Top**, Pat Travers, Rossington Collins Band, Triumph, The Johnny Van Zant Band, Point Blank	—	—
Rock Superbowl X	April 18, 1981	**Heart**, Cheap Trick, Blue Öyster Cult, UFO, Firefall	—	—
Rock Superbowl XI	July 16, 1981	**REO Speedwagon**, Foghat, Billy Squier, Rossington Collins Band	—	—
Rock Superbowl 1981	October 24-25, 1981	**The Rolling Stones**, Van Halen, Henry Paul Band	—	—
Rock Superbowl XIV	March 20, 1982	**Foreigner**, Pat Travers, UFO, Bryan Adams	—	Ozzy Osbourne was scheduled to perform but cancelled due to the death of Randy Rhoads the previous day.
Rock Superbowl 1982	September 4, 1982	**Fleetwood Mac,** John Mellencamp,Loverboy, LeRoux, John Waite	50,000	—
Rock Superbowl XVI	November 27, 1982	**The Who**, Joan Jett and the Blackhearts, The B-52s	—	—
Rock Superbowl XVII	April 23, 1983	**Journey**, Aerosmith, Bryan Adams, Sammy Hagar	—	—
Rock Superbowl 1983	May 28, 1983	**ZZ Top**, Sammy Hagar, Triumph, Foghat	—	—
Rock Superbowl 19	October 29, 1983	**The Police**, The Fixx, Eric Burdon and The Animals	—	—
