= Ozzy Osbourne Live E.P. =

1980 live EP by Ozzy Osbourne

EP (Live) by Ozzy Osbourne
- Released: 7 November 1980 (UK)
- Recorded: 2 October 1980
- Venue: Gaumont Theatre, Southampton, UK
- Genre: Heavy metal
- Length: 13:12
- Label: Jet
- Producer: Max Norman

Ozzy Osbourne chronology
Blizzard of Ozz (1980)	Ozzy Osbourne Live E.P. (1980)	Diary of a Madman (1981)

Ozzy Osbourne Live E.P. is a live EP released by Ozzy Osbourne in 1980. The EP contains live versions of the songs "Mr. Crowley" and "Suicide Solution", originally released on the 1980 studio album Blizzard of Ozz, as well as the previously unreleased track "You Said It All", all performed at a 1980 live performance in Southampton, England.

== Overview ==
After performing a show in Birmingham, the band hastily returned to Ridge Farm Studio to remix the song "Goodbye to Romance" for an anticipated single release. The next morning they were informed that the plan had changed and Jet Records instead wanted a brand new song to release as a single. Rhoads, Daisley, and Kerslake quickly put together the song "You Said It All", with drummer Kerslake performing the guide vocal at soundcheck while a drunken Osbourne slept under the drum riser. The plans to record a studio version of "You Said It All" were soon scrapped for unknown reasons, and this live version is the only known recording.

== Track listing ==
All tracks by Ozzy Osbourne, Randy Rhoads and Bob Daisley unless noted.

No.	Title	Writer(s)	Length
1.	"Mr. Crowley"		4:51
2.	"You Said It All"	Osbourne, Rhoads, Daisley, Lee Kerslake	3:53
3.	"Suicide Solution"		4:28

UK 7" version
No.	Title	Length
1.	"Mr. Crowley"	4:51
2.	"You Said It All"	3:53

== Personnel ==
- Ozzy Osbourne – vocals
- Randy Rhoads – guitar
- Bob Daisley – bass
- Lee Kerslake – drums
- Lindsay Bridgwater – keyboards

== Charts ==
Chart (1982)	Peak position
US Billboard 200	120
