= Peabody Auditorium =

- Interactive map of Peabody Auditorium
- Address: 600 Auditorium Blvd; Daytona Beach, Florida; United States
- Coordinates: 29.22735°N 81.01057°W
- Capacity: 2,521

Construction
- Opened: October 6, 1949

Website
- www.peabodyauditorium.org

The Peabody Auditorium in Daytona Beach, Florida has been home to performances of the Daytona Beach Symphony Society for more than sixty years and was the summer home of the London Symphony Orchestra from 1966 until 2009. The 2,521-seat venue hosts touring Broadway shows, headline performers, opera, drama, and comedy performances. In addition to in-house programming, presenters include civic ballet, schools, cheerleading, bodybuilding and dance competitions, non-profit and for-profit promoters.

== History ==
A former auditorium in Daytona Beach (on the mainland on south Beach Street, not at its present location), built in 1919, enjoyed appearances by many of the world's most famous performers and orators including Rudolph Nureyev and Sergei Rachmaninoff, but was destroyed by fire in 1946. After considerable planning by the Daytona Beach City Commission and civic donors, the current Peabody Auditorium was constructed at a cost of $750,000 (equivalent to $10.1 million in 2025) and opened to the public on 6 October 1949. It was named Peabody Auditorium in honor of Simon J. Peabody who donated the land and was instrumental in building the former auditorium. Artist Frederick Dana Marsh completed the exterior sculptures of four muses. Until 1952, however, only white persons were permitted to attend events at Peabody Auditorium.

== Entertainment ==
The theatre has a long history of presenting international stars of arts and entertainment including Elvis Presley, Tony Bennett, James Taylor, Liza Minnelli, Frank Sinatra, Jerry Seinfeld and David Copperfield. The Peabody has also hosted many Broadway productions including CATS, 42nd Street, Chicago, STOMP, Joseph and the Amazing Technicolor Dreamcoat and Riverdance.
