= Crazy Train =

1980 single by Ozzy Osbourne

Single by Ozzy Osbourne

from the album Blizzard of Ozz
- B-side: "You Lookin' at Me Lookin' at You"
- Released: 29 August 1980 (UK): February 1981 (US)
- Studio: Ridge Farm Studio, Rusper, West Sussex
- Genre: Heavy metal
- Length: 4:52
- Label: Jet; Epic
- Composers: Bob Daisley; Ozzy Osbourne; Randy Rhoads
- Lyricist: Bob Daisley
- Producers: Bob Daisley; Lee Kerslake; Randy Rhoads

Ozzy Osbourne singles chronology
"Crazy Train" (1980)	"Mr. Crowley" (1980)

Music video
- "Crazy Train" on YouTube

Animated music video
- "Crazy Train" on YouTube

"Crazy Train (Live)"

Single by Ozzy Osbourne

from the album Tribute
- B-side: "Crazy Train"; "I Don't Know"
- Released: 22 June 1987
- Recorded: 1981
- Genre: Heavy metal; glam metal
- Length: 5:19
- Label: Epic
- Composers: Bob Daisley; Ozzy Osbourne; Randy Rhoads
- Lyricist: Bob Daisley
- Producer: Max Norman

Ozzy Osbourne singles chronology
"The Ultimate Sin" (1986)	"Crazy Train (Live)" (1987)	"Miracle Man" (1988)

Audio
- "Crazy Train" (live, 1981) on YouTube

"Crazy Train" is the debut solo single by English heavy metal singer Ozzy Osbourne, released in 1980 from his debut album as a solo artist, Blizzard of Ozz (1980). The song was written by Osbourne, Randy Rhoads, and Bob Daisley. The lyrics deal with the subject of the Cold War and the fear of annihilation that existed during that period. On its original release, "Crazy Train" reached the top 50 in the UK. Following Osbourne's death in 2025, the song entered the Hot 100 for the first time at number 46 and later peaked at number 39, becoming Osbourne's second US top 40 hit as a solo artist after "Mama, I'm Coming Home".

== Production ==
Guitarist Greg Leon, who initially took Randy Rhoads's place in Quiet Riot, has claimed that he helped Rhoads write what would become the "Crazy Train" riff. "We were hanging out, and I showed him the riff to Steve Miller's 'Swingtown'. I said: 'Look what happens when you speed this riff up.' We messed around, and the next thing I know he took it to a whole other level and end up writing the 'Crazy Train' riff." Bassist Bob Daisley has dismissed rumours that the riff was not created solely by Rhoads.

The track contains what is described as "evil laughter" by Loudwire.

== Reception and legacy ==
AllMusic reviewer Steve Huey described the main guitar riff as "a classic, making use of the full minor scale in a way not seen since Ritchie Blackmore's heyday with Deep Purple."

The song is one of Osbourne's best known and recognizable as a solo performer. It was rated as having the 9th-greatest guitar solo ever by readers of Guitar World magazine. The song was also ranked ninth by VH1 on the list of the 40 Greatest Metal Songs and in 2009 it was named the 23rd-greatest hard rock song of all time also by VH1, the highest placement by a solo artist on the list. In 2015, "Sleazegrinder" of Louder included the song in his list of "The 20 Greatest Hair Metal Anthems Of All Time", placing it at number 8. He wrote: "Crazy Train's signature riff is so iconic that literally everyone you know knows it, could identify it in three seconds or less, and will tell you it's a damn good tune. And it is. The fact that Rhoads died before he could see what a lasting impact it had on heavy metal is a shame, but holy smokes, what a fucking song."

In 2021, it topped Metal Hammer's readers' poll of the Top 50 Ozzy Osbourne songs, with the magazine informing that it is Osbourne's most played song, with over 1150 live performances, over 18 million plays on YouTube, and more than 800 million on Spotify (as of July 2025). In 2023, Rolling Stone ranked the song number six on their list of the 100 greatest heavy metal songs.

The track was prominently sampled by rapper Trick Daddy in his 2004 song "Let's Go", which peaked at No. 7 on the Billboard charts.

"Crazy Train" has been used as the walk-out song for Premier League football club Aston Villa F.C.. Osbourne was a fan of the team, which is based in his hometown of Birmingham. Similarly, the National Football League (NFL)'s New England Patriots currently use "Crazy Train" as their entrance song.

== Chart performance ==
The single reached No. 49 on the United Kingdom singles chart in 1980. In the United States, the song reached No. 9 on the Billboard Top Tracks chart and the single peaked at No. 6 on the Billboard Bubbling Under the Hot 100 chart in 1981. The master ringtone was certified double platinum and had by September 2010 sold 1,750,000 downloads. The Tribute re-release was accompanied by a music video.

After Osbourne's death in 2025, the song debuted on the US Billboard Hot 100 at number 46 with 9.2 million official U.S. streams, 2.4 million radio audience impressions, and 11,000 paid downloads.

In August 2026 Osbourne's "Crazy Train" joined Spotify's Billions Club by surpassing 1 Billion streams.

== Personnel ==
1980 Studio Version

- Randy Rhoads – guitar
- Bob Daisley – bass guitar
- Lee Kerslake – drums, vibraslap
- Ozzy Osbourne – lead vocals

1981 Live Version (Music Video Version)

- Randy Rhoads – guitar
- Rudy Sarzo – bass guitar
- Tommy Aldridge – drums
- Ozzy Osbourne – lead vocals

2002 re-issue

- Ozzy Osbourne – vocals
- Randy Rhoads – guitar
- Robert Trujillo – bass
- Mike Bordin – drums
- Don Airey – keyboards

== Charts ==
=== Weekly charts ===
1980–1981 weekly chart performance for "Crazy Train"
Chart (1980–81)	Peak position
UK Singles (Official Charts)	49
US Bubbling Under Hot 100 Singles (Billboard)	6
US Mainstream Rock (Billboard)	9

Chart performance for "Crazy Train (Live)"
Chart (1987)	Peak position
UK Singles (Official Charts)	99

2009–2022 weekly chart performance for "Crazy Train"
Chart (2009–2022)	Peak position
Canada Digital Song Sales (Billboard)	88
UK Rock & Metal (Official Charts)	18
US Hard Rock Digital Song Sales (Billboard)	1
US Hard Rock Streaming Songs (Billboard)	17

2025 weekly chart performance for "Crazy Train"
Chart (2025)	Peak position
Austria (Ö3 Austria Top 40)	68
Canada Hot 100 (Billboard)	27
Czech Republic Singles Digital (ČNS IFPI)	48
Finland (Suomen virallinen lista)	45
Global 200 (Billboard)	28
Greece International (IFPI)	69
Japan Hot Overseas (Billboard Japan)	8
Netherlands (Single Tip)	16
New Zealand (Recorded Music NZ)	27
Norway (IFPI Norge)	46
Sweden (Sverigetopplistan)	18
UK Singles (Official Charts)	25
UK Rock & Metal (Official Charts)	3
US Billboard Hot 100	39
US Hot Rock & Alternative Songs (Billboard)	6

=== Year-end charts ===
Year-end chart performance for "Crazy Train"
Chart (2011)	Position
US Hard Rock Digital Song Sales (Billboard)	19
Chart (2012)	Position
US Hard Rock Digital Song Sales (Billboard)	6
Chart (2021)	Position
US Hard Rock Digital Song Sales (Billboard)	24
Chart (2022)	Position
US Hard Rock Streaming Songs (Billboard)	21
Chart (2025)	Position
US Hot Rock & Alternative Songs (Billboard)	65

== Certifications ==
Region	Certification	Certified units/sales
Denmark (IFPI Danmark)	Gold	45,000^{‡}
Italy (FIMI)	Gold	50,000^{‡}
New Zealand (RMNZ)	2× Platinum	60,000^{‡}
Spain (Promusicae)	Gold	30,000^{‡}
United Kingdom (BPI)	Platinum	600,000^{‡}
United States (RIAA)	4× Platinum	4,000,000^{‡}
Ringtone/Mastertone
United States (RIAA) Mastertone	2× Platinum	2,000,000^{*}
Streaming
Greece (IFPI Greece)	Gold	1,000,000^{†}
^{*} Sales figures based on certification alone.^{‡} Sales+streaming figures based on certification alone.^{†} Streaming-only figures based on certification alone.

== See also ==
- List of train songs
- List of songs about the Cold War
