= Goodbye to Romance (song) =

Song by Ozzy Osbourne

Song by Ozzy Osbourne

from the album Blizzard of Ozz
- Released: 12 September 1980
- Studio: Ridge Farm Studio, Rusper, England
- Genre: Soft rock
- Length: 5:35
- Label: Jet
- Composer(s): Ozzy Osbourne; Randy Rhoads
- Lyricist(s): Bob Daisley
- Producer(s): Ozzy Osbourne; Bob Daisley; Lee Kerslake; Randy Rhoads

"Goodbye to Romance" is a song written by Ozzy Osbourne, Bob Daisley and Randy Rhoads from Osbourne's 1980 album Blizzard of Ozz. A ballad, the song has been characterized as influenced by the chord progressions of Pachelbel's Canon (or the Canon in D) by composer Johann Pachelbel.

== Background and lyrics ==
"Goodbye to Romance" was the first track written for Blizzard of Ozz, and the first song that Osbourne and guitarist Randy Rhoads completed together. Osbourne has said that the song was written as his farewell to his former band Black Sabbath.

The lyrics of "Goodbye to Romance" express mourning over a love being lost. Though the song's initial verses communicate the sorrow of the protagonist, the third verse onward sees the protagonist speaking of leaving their past behind, and looking optimistically towards their future.

== Composition and arrangement ==
Rhoads's chord progressions in "Goodbye to Romance" have been classified as an adaptation of the progressions found in Pachelbel's Canon (also known as the Canon in D) by Baroque composer Johann Pachelbel. Author Gareth Heritage identifies the introductory guitar motif in "Goodbye to Romance" as "closely [resembling] the first motivic development" of Pachelbel's Canon, and points to the similarities between "the stepwise melodic contour and accompanying bass countermelody" in both compositions. The countermelody in "Goodbye of Romance" contains the same notes as the countermelody in Pachelbel's Canon, in the form of four descending bass guitar minims rather than four descending violin crotchets.

Heritage also writes that both Pachelbel's Canon and "Goodbye to Romance" use a progression of eight chords in D major, though the former "has a stronger sense of being in major key [...] whereas the tonality for 'Goodbye to Romance' is stylistically nuanced to reflect the melancholic qualities of a rock ballad." The harmony of "Goodbye to Romance" features slight deviations from that of Pachelbel's Canon, including "modifying the I-V (D-A) chord change in bars 1 and 2 with an I-iii (D F#m) chord change in bars 1 and 2 of the verse", with the resulting effect, Heritage argues, better suits "the melancholic subtext of the accompanying lyrics." The outro melody of "Goodbye to Romance" features a fanfare-style motif played using a synthesized trumpet.

== Live performances ==
During the Diary of a Madman tour that began in late 1981 and continued into 1982, Osbourne and his band performed "Goodbye to Romance" live; around halfway through the song, a staged execution by hanging would take place, with John Allen, a dwarf, being suspended in the air with a fake noose around his neck.

== Personnel ==
- Ozzy Osbourne – vocals
- Randy Rhoads – guitars
- Bob Daisley – bass guitar
- Lee Kerslake – drums
