= Mr. Crowley =

- 1980 live single artwork

Single by Ozzy Osbourne

from the album Blizzard of Ozz
- B-side: "No Bone Movies"
- Released: 1981
- Recorded: 22 March – 19 April 1980
- Genre: Heavy metal
- Length: 4:55
- Label: Jet
- Composers: Ozzy Osbourne, Randy Rhoads, Bob Daisley
- Lyricist: Bob Daisley
- Producers: Ozzy Osbourne, Randy Rhoads, Bob Daisley, Lee Kerslake

Ozzy Osbourne singles chronology
"Crazy Train" (1980)	"Mr. Crowley" (1981)	"Flying High Again" (1981)

"Mr. Crowley" is a song by English heavy metal singer Ozzy Osbourne, about English occultist Aleister Crowley. Written by Osbourne, guitarist Randy Rhoads and bass guitarist/lyricist Bob Daisley, it was released on Osbourne's debut solo album Blizzard of Ozz in September 1980 in the United Kingdom. A live version was released as a UK single in November 1980. In North America, the studio version was released as a single in 1981.

The song begins with a keyboard solo by Don Airey. "I just cleared [the band] out of the studio and said, 'Come back in half an hour,'" he recalled. "Ozzy came back, heard it, and said, 'You just plugged into my head, man.'"

The first guitar solo by Randy Rhoads became one of the best known in heavy metal. It was ranked 28th best guitar solo by the readers of Guitar World in 2011. The song was ranked the 23rd greatest heavy metal song of all time, according to a 2011 reader poll by Gibson.

== Overview ==
"Mr. Crowley" was the second of two singles from Blizzard of Ozz, after "Crazy Train". It was inspired by Aleister Crowley's book The Diary of a Drug Fiend that Osbourne had read, and a deck of tarot cards found in the studio as recording of the album was commencing. Crowley was an English occultist and ceremonial magician who had founded the Thelemite religion in the early 20th century. Contrary to the song, he pronounced his name to rhyme with "holy".

== In popular culture ==
The song was included in Guitar Hero World Tour, along with "Crazy Train" and an in-game avatar of Ozzy himself, who becomes unlocked as a playable character upon completing both songs in the vocalist career, and was made available to download on 31 May 2011 for Rock Band 3. The song was also featured in Brütal Legend.

== Personnel ==
1980 studio version

- Randy Rhoads – guitar
- Bob Daisley – bass guitar
- Lee Kerslake – drums
- Don Airey – keyboard/piano
- Ozzy Osbourne – lead vocals

1981 live version (music video version)

- Randy Rhoads – guitar
- Rudy Sarzo – bass guitar
- Tommy Aldridge – drums
- Don Airey – keyboard/piano
- Ozzy Osbourne – lead vocals

== Charts ==
2025 weekly chart performance for "Mr. Crowley"
Chart (2025)	Peak position
Sweden Heatseeker (Sverigetopplistan)	17
US Hot Rock & Alternative Songs (Billboard)	22
UK Rock & Metal (Official Charts)	27

== Certifications ==
Region	Certification	Certified units/sales
United States (RIAA)	Gold	500,000^{‡}
^{‡} Sales+streaming figures based on certification alone.

== See also ==
- Mr. Crowley Live EP
