= Suicide Solution =

1980 song by Ozzy Osbourne

Song by Ozzy Osbourne

from the album Blizzard of Ozz
- Released: 20 September 1980; 22 August 1995 (re-issue)
- Recorded: 22 March – 19 April 1980
- Genre: Heavy metal
- Length: 4:16
- Label: Jet; Epic
- Songwriters: Ozzy Osbourne; Randy Rhoads; Bob Daisley
- Lyricist: Bob Daisley
- Producers: Ozzy Osbourne; Randy Rhoads; Bob Daisley; Lee Kerslake

"Suicide Solution" is a song by the English heavy metal singer Ozzy Osbourne, from his 1980 debut album Blizzard of Ozz.

== Overview ==
Osbourne said in 1991 that the song was about the alcohol-related death of AC/DC's Bon Scott in 1980, but Bob Daisley revealed in 2002 that he had Osbourne himself in mind when he wrote the lyrics. Daisley affirmed the lyrics are "a warning to anybody that's drinking themselves into an early grave". The riff was based on another riff that guitarist Randy Rhoads had used on a song with his previous group Quiet Riot, "Force of Habit".

=== Controversy ===
On 1 November 1985, a lawsuit against Osbourne and CBS Records was filed by the parents of John Daniel McCollum, a 19-year-old who took his own life in Indio, California on 27 October 1984 allegedly after listening to the song. The plaintiffs, however, failed to prove that Osbourne had any responsibility for the teenager's death. The plaintiffs' attorneys alleged that a line in the song stated, "Why try? Get the gun and shoot!" Lyricist Daisley and Osbourne himself both claimed that the line actually says, "Get the flaps out". "Flaps", they insisted, was an English vulgar slang term for "vagina". Don Arden, Black Sabbath's former manager and the father of Sharon Osbourne, is on record as having said of the song's controversial lyrics: "To be perfectly honest, I would be doubtful as to whether Mr. Osbourne knew the meaning of the lyrics, if there was any meaning, because his command of the English language is minimal."

The 1990 horror film Dead Girls was loosely inspired by McCollum's suicide and the subsequent lawsuit over his death.

Following McCollum's demise, two other American teenagers Michael Jeffery Waller and Harold Matthew Hamilton shot themselves in 1986 and 1988 respectively, while reportedly listening to the song. Osbourne was similarly sued by their parents in 1990 but again the suit was dismissed. Osbourne replied: "It'd be a pretty bad career move for me to write a song saying ‘Grab a gun and kill yourself’. I wouldn’t have many fans left".

== Personnel ==
1980 Studio Version

- Randy Rhoads – guitar
- Bob Daisley – bass guitar
- Lee Kerslake – drums
- Ozzy Osbourne – lead vocals

1981 Live Version (Music Video Version)

- Randy Rhoads – guitar
- Rudy Sarzo – bass guitar
- Tommy Aldridge – drums
- Ozzy Osbourne – lead vocals

== See also ==
- "Adam's Song", by Blink-182
- "Better by You, Better than Me", by Spooky Tooth
- Murder of Elyse Pahler
