= Blizzard of Ozz =

Studio album by Ozzy Osbourne
- Released: 12 September 1980
- Recorded: 22 March − 19 April 1980
- Studios: Ridge Farm Studio, Rusper, England
- Genre: Heavy metal
- Length: 39:31
- Label: Jet
- Producers: Ozzy Osbourne; Randy Rhoads; Bob Daisley; Lee Kerslake

Ozzy Osbourne chronology
Blizzard of Ozz (1980)	Ozzy Osbourne Live E.P. (1980)

Singles from Blizzard of Ozz
- 1. "Crazy Train" Released: 29 August 1980; 2. "Mr. Crowley" Released: 1981 (US)

Blizzard of Ozz is the debut solo studio album by the English heavy metal singer Ozzy Osbourne. Released on 12 September 1980 in the UK and on 27 March 1981 in the US, the album was Osbourne's first release following his firing from Black Sabbath in 1979. Blizzard of Ozz is the first of two studio albums Osbourne recorded with guitarist Randy Rhoads prior to Rhoads' death in 1982.

Two singles were taken from the album, "Crazy Train" and "Mr. Crowley"; the former peaked at No. 49 on the UK singles chart. The album was subject to controversy over the song "Suicide Solution" and its alleged role in a teenager's suicide in 1984. Despite this, it has received critical acclaim and in 2017 was ranked 9th on Rolling Stone's list of "100 Greatest Metal Albums of All Time".

== Background ==
Ozzy Osbourne had been the frontman of Black Sabbath from 1968 to 1979, during which time the group had released popular and acclaimed albums such as Paranoid and Master of Reality. However, Osbourne's drug problems caused tension in the group and ultimately resulted in him being fired in 1979. After being fired, he signed to Jet Records and put together a solo band.

In his autobiography, Osbourne readily admitted that at the time the album was being recorded, he felt he was in direct competition with his former band, Black Sabbath.

== Composition and recording ==
Much of the album was written by guitarist Randy Rhoads, bassist Bob Daisley, and Ozzy Osbourne while staying at the Monnow Valley Studio near Monmouth, Wales, with Osbourne's friend Barry Scrannage temporarily filling in on drums. As Scrannage was never considered a candidate to be the group's permanent drummer, he was not involved in the songwriting process at all. The band recorded demos of the songs "I Don't Know" (which became Osbourne's second most-performed song), "Crazy Train" (the most performed one), "Goodbye to Romance", and "You Looking at Me Looking at You" in Birmingham in early 1980 with ex-Lone Star drummer Dixie Lee. They had hoped Lee would be a permanent member, but "he wasn't the final piece of the puzzle", bassist Daisley recalls. After auditioning several drummers, ex-Uriah Heep member Lee Kerslake was hired as the permanent drummer. The completed lineup retreated to Clearwell Castle in Gloucestershire for six days to rehearse and give Kerslake an opportunity to learn the new songs. A week later, they travelled to Ridge Farm Studio to commence recording.

According to Daisley, after reading an attempt at lyrics made by Osbourne and Rhoads, he disapproved them as "cheesy and corny and cliché" and offered to do them instead, leading to him being the lyricist for all the songs. His lyrical approach deemed that given Osbourne's history with Black Sabbath, "they had to be different from your average cliché rock lyrics, or love songs", thus he took a more philosophical outlook, "have some kind of message that would touch somebody, or at least make them think." The first track written for the album was "Goodbye to Romance". Osbourne has stated that the song was his way of saying goodbye to his former band Black Sabbath, as he had thought his career was over after leaving the band. After performing a show in Birmingham, the band hastily returned to Ridge Farm to remix "Goodbye to Romance" for a single. The next morning, they were informed that their label, Jet Records, instead wanted a brand-new song to release as a single. Rhoads, Daisley, and Kerslake quickly put together the song "You Said It All", with drummer Kerslake performing the guide vocal at soundcheck while a drunken Osbourne slept under the drum riser. The song was ultimately never recorded, though a live version was released on Ozzy Osbourne Live EP in 1980.

The final track written was "No Bone Movies", originally intended as a B-side, but it was added to the album to give Kerslake a writing credit, since all the other material had been written before he joined the band. Its lyrics were written by Daisley to express his dislike for porn films. Keyboardist Don Airey claims that parts of "Revelation (Mother Earth)" as well as the intro to "Mr. Crowley" were written by him in the studio, though he chose to forgo writing credit for these contributions as a favor to Osbourne, who was in dire financial straits at the time. "Revelation" discusses climate change, using biblical imagery to criticize humankind's damage towards the planet. The instrumental "Dee" was written by Rhoads as a tribute to his mother, Delores. "Steal Away (The Night)" was left as the closing track because, according to Osbourne, "I've always liked the idea of ending the album with an uptempo song, like ending the live set with 'Paranoid'."

Chris Tsangarides was originally hired to produce the album, with Max Norman to serve as studio engineer. Osbourne and the band were very unhappy with Tsangarides' production, and he was fired and replaced with Norman, who stepped in to complete production and engineering. Norman's production work on Blizzard of Ozz is uncredited, though he did go on to produce all of Osbourne's albums prior to 1986's The Ultimate Sin.

At the time of the album's recording, the band itself was billed as "The Blizzard of Ozz". The band members were expecting the album to be credited to the band with Osbourne's name in smaller print, just as it appeared on the "Crazy Train" single released several days prior. The back cover of the first pressing of the "Crazy Train" single stated that the track came from a forthcoming Jet Records album entitled Ozzy Osbourne/ Blizzard of Ozz Vol. 1. In fact, when the band appeared at the Reading Festival in 1980 they were billed simply as "Ossie Osborne's [sic] New Band". According to Daisley, "When the album was released the words 'Ozzy Osbourne' were in bigger print than 'The Blizzard of Ozz' which made it look like an Ozzy Osbourne album called The Blizzard of Ozz. Randy [Rhoads] was never one to rock the boat. He knew he was in a situation which was a good opportunity for him being relatively unknown, so when Lee [Kerslake] and I were ousted, Randy had no allies and the act became 'Ozzy Osbourne' and no longer a band." Rhoads felt that he and Daisley were contributing the vast majority of the songwriting and arranging, and he had little interest in performing in a backing band for someone he felt wasn't contributing as much. Drummer Kerslake has maintained that Rhoads almost left the band in late 1981, due to this displeasure. "He didn't want to go [on tour with Osbourne]. We told him we were thrown out. He said he was going to leave the band as he did not want to leave us behind. I told him not to be stupid but thanks for the sentiment", the drummer later recalled. Entertainment attorney Steven Machat, who was involved in the deal Osbourne signed with Jet Records, said in his 2011 book Gods, Gangsters and Honour: A Rock 'n' Roll Odyssey that Osbourne's soon-to-be manager and wife Sharon Levy was not happy with the level of creative input that Rhoads, Daisley, and Kerslake had in the Blizzard of Ozz album and did not want them to share the credit. Album producer Max Norman concurs that Daisley and Kerslake made considerable songwriting contributions during their time in the band, while also noting that the Osbourne camp "might want to dispute that now."

Although Sharon has said that the recording of Blizzard of Ozz was one of the best experiences of her life, she was in L.A. during the recording and not yet involved with the band. Osbourne's then-wife, Thelma, was present at Ridge Farm Studios for much of the recording.

== Release ==
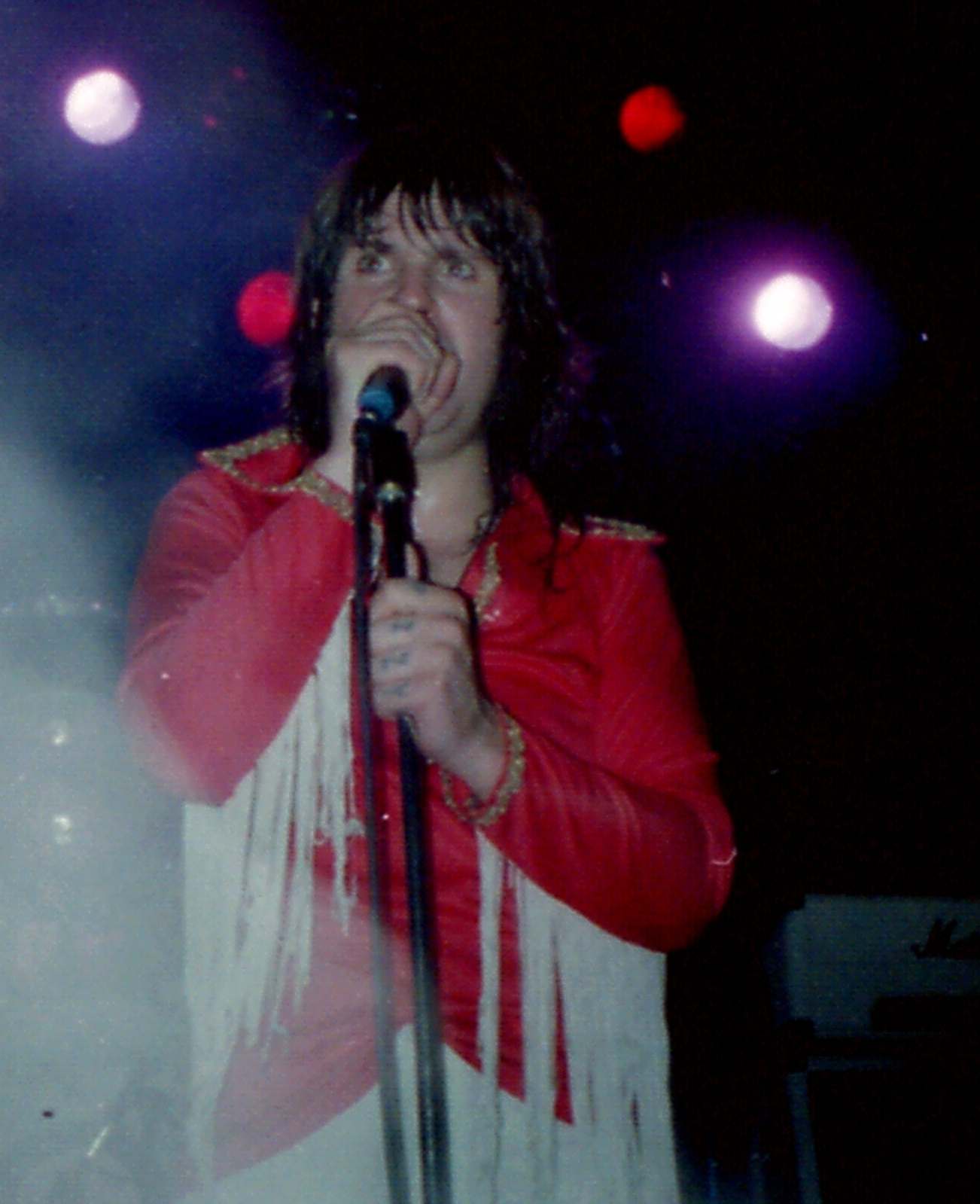
Osbourne performing in support of Blizzard of Ozz in Cardiff, Wales, 9 October 1980

The album tracks "Crazy Train" and "Mr. Crowley" were released as singles in 1980. "Crazy Train" made number 49 on the UK Singles Chart and was moderately successful in the United States, reaching number 9 on the Billboard Top Tracks chart and the single peaked at number 6 on the Billboard Bubbling Under the Hot 100 chart in 1981. Though it received little radio airplay upon its initial release, "Crazy Train" has become one of Osbourne's signature songs and a staple of classic rock radio playlists over the ensuing years. In January 2009, the song achieved a 2× Platinum certification status.

The album was a commercial success, being certified 4× Platinum in the US in 1997, a feat Osbourne would not achieve again until No More Tears was certified in 2000. In 2019 it was certified 5× Platinum. In the UK, it was the first of four Osbourne albums to attain Silver certification (60,000 units shipped) by the British Phonographic Industry, achieving this in August 1981.

== Reception ==
Professional ratings
Review scores
Source	Rating
AllMusic	4.5/5 stars
Martin Popoff	8/10 stars
Rolling Stone	4/5 stars
Uncut	3.5/5 stars
Virgin Encyclopedia of Popular Music	3/5 stars

The album has received critical acclaim since its release, and is today regarded as a classic of the heavy metal genre. Writing for AllMusic, Steve Huey would write, "Ozzy Osbourne's 1981 solo debut Blizzard of Ozz was a masterpiece of neo-classical metal that, along with Van Halen's first album, became a cornerstone of '80s metal guitar," concluding his review by declaring the album, "Nothing short of revelatory, Blizzard of Ozz deservedly made Ozzy a star, and it set new standards for musical virtuosity in the realm of heavy metal."

Blizzard of Ozz was ranked 9th on Rolling Stone's list of "100 Greatest Metal Albums of All Time". and 13th on a Guitar World readers poll of the "100 Greatest Guitar Albums of All Time".

== Reissues ==
Blizzard of Ozz was controversially re-released in 2002 with the original bass and drum tracks replaced by newly recorded parts from bassist Robert Trujillo and drummer Mike Bordin; however, the original bass and drum tracks were reinstated for the 2011 release due to public outcry. The 2011 release was certified Silver by BPI in 2013. A box set featuring both re-issued albums, the Blizzard of Ozz/Diary of a Madman 30th Anniversary Deluxe Box Set, was released, featuring both CD re-issues, 180-gram LP Vinyl versions of both albums (original album only), the "Thirty Years After the Blizzard" DVD Documentary, over 70 minutes of additional rare live performances and interviews, a replica of Ozzy's cross, and a 2 sided poster.

On 18 September 2020, Osbourne released an expanded edition of Blizzard of Ozz including the bonus tracks and outtakes included on previous reissues (i.e. the 2002 reissue and the 2011 expanded edition) as well as seven live recordings from the Blizzard of Ozz tour and one additional live track.

== Controversies ==
=== "Suicide Solution" ===
The song "Suicide Solution" has met with its share of controversy, most notably the October 1984 suicide of 19-year-old John McCollum who shot himself in the head. McCollum's parents alleged that their son had listened to the song immediately prior to killing himself, and they sued Osbourne along with CBS Records for "encouraging self-destructive behavior" in young people who were "especially susceptible" to dangerous influences (McCollum et al. v. CBS, Inc., et al.). In his defence, Osbourne stated in court that when the song was being written the words "Wine is fine but whiskey's quicker" came to him suddenly and were a reflection not on the merits of suicide but rather on the death of AC/DC vocalist Bon Scott, a friend of Osbourne's who had recently died of alcohol-related misadventure. Bob Daisley, who claims to have written the majority of the song's lyrics, has stated that he had Osbourne's own substance abuse issues in mind when he composed the song. The McCollums' complaint was dismissed on the grounds that the First Amendment protected Osbourne's right to free artistic expression.

=== Songwriting credits ===
In 1986, Daisley and Kerslake sued Osbourne for unpaid royalties, eventually winning songwriting credits on Blizzard of Ozz and Diary of a Madman. Subsequently, a 2002 reissue was made of these albums which replaced Daisley and Kerslake's original bass and drum parts with new parts recorded by Osbourne's then-current drummer Mike Bordin and bassist Robert Trujillo. The 2002 reissue also included new backing vocals from singers Mark Lennon and John Shanks.

Osbourne's wife and manager, Sharon, claimed at the time that it was Ozzy, not she, who was responsible for the decision to re-record the parts, stating "because of Daisley and Kerslake's abusive and unjust behaviour, Ozzy wanted to remove them from these recordings. We turned a negative into a positive by adding a fresh sound to the original albums." However, Osbourne contradicted this claim in his 2009 autobiography I Am Ozzy, stating that the decision to re-record the original bass and drum parts was Sharon's decision, and that he "didn't have anything to do with" it. He said his wife "just snapped" and had it done without his knowledge. He also stated that "a sticker was put on the covers telling everyone about it", although the sticker was not initially placed on the re-issue and was only placed on the covers at a later date due to fan outcry over the altered recordings.

In 2003, Daisley and Kerslake's lawsuit was dismissed by the United States District Court in Los Angeles. This dismissal was upheld by the US Court of Appeals for the Ninth Circuit. With regard to the reissue, Ozzy stated to The Pulse of Radio, reiterating a conversation with Sharon, "You know what, whatever the circumstances were, I want the original thing back." The 30th Anniversary release of Blizzard of Ozz and Diary of a Madman contains the original recordings, not the 2002 remixes.

== Track listing ==
All songs written by Ozzy Osbourne, Randy Rhoads and Bob Daisley, except where noted.

Side one
No.	Title	Writer(s)	Length
1.	"I Don't Know"		5:16
2.	"Crazy Train"		4:52
3.	"Goodbye to Romance"		5:36
4.	"Dee" (Instrumental)	Rhoads	0:50
5.	"Suicide Solution"		4:20

Side two
No.	Title	Writer(s)	Length
6.	"Mr. Crowley"		4:57
7.	"No Bone Movies"	Osbourne, Rhoads, Daisley, Lee Kerslake	3:58
8.	"Revelation (Mother Earth)"		6:09
9.	"Steal Away (The Night)"		3:28
Total length:			39:31

2002 reissue bonus track
No.	Title	Length
10.	"You Lookin' at Me Lookin' at You"	4:20
Total length:		43:33

2011 expanded edition bonus tracks
No.	Title	Writer(s)	Length
10.	"You Looking at Me, Looking at You" (Non-LP B-side)		4:15
11.	"Goodbye to Romance" (2010 guitar & vocal mix)		5:42
12.	"RR" (Outtake from "Blizzard of Ozz" sessions)	Rhoads	1:13
Total length:			50:23

== Personnel ==
- Randy Rhoads – guitar
- Bob Daisley – bass guitar
- Lee Kerslake – drums, tubular bells, timpani, vibraslap
- Ozzy Osbourne – lead vocals
- Don Airey – keyboards

2002 reissue

- Ozzy Osbourne – lead vocals, harmony vocals
- Randy Rhoads – guitars, classical guitar
- Robert Trujillo – bass
- Mike Bordin – drums, percussion, timpani, gong
- Danny Saber – tubular bells
- Mark Lennon – backing vocals
- John Shanks – backing vocals on "Steal Away (The Night)"

Production

- Produced by Ozzy Osbourne, Randy Rhoads, Bob Daisley, and Lee Kerslake
- Max Norman – engineer
- Chris Athens – mastering at Sterling Sound, New York
- Thom Panunzio, Germán Villacorta – reissue engineers
- Stephen Marcussen – reissue remastering

== Charts ==
Chart (1980–1981)	Peak position
Canada Top Albums/CDs (RPM)	8
UK Albums (Official Charts)	7
US Billboard 200	21

Chart (1986–1987)	Peak position
New Zealand Albums (RMNZ)	47
Spanish Albums (AFYVE)	34

Chart (2021)	Peak position
Scottish Albums (Official Charts)	76
UK Rock & Metal Albums (Official Charts)	18

Chart (2025)	Peak position
Belgian Albums (Ultratop Flanders)	170
Finnish Albums (Suomen virallinen lista)	50
Hungarian Physical Albums (MAHASZ)	36
Norwegian Albums (IFPI Norge)	30
Polish Albums (ZPAV)	19
Swedish Albums (Sverigetopplistan)	34
Swiss Albums (Schweizer Hitparade)	94

== Certifications ==
Region	Certification	Certified units/sales
Australia (ARIA)	Gold	35,000^{‡}
Canada (Music Canada)	Platinum	100,000^{^}
United Kingdom (BPI)	Silver	60,000^{^}
United Kingdom (BPI) 2011 Release	Gold	100,000^{‡}
United States (RIAA)	5× Platinum	5,000,000^{‡}
^{^} Shipments figures based on certification alone.^{‡} Sales+streaming figures based on certification alone.
