= Randy Rhoads =

American guitarist (1956–1982)

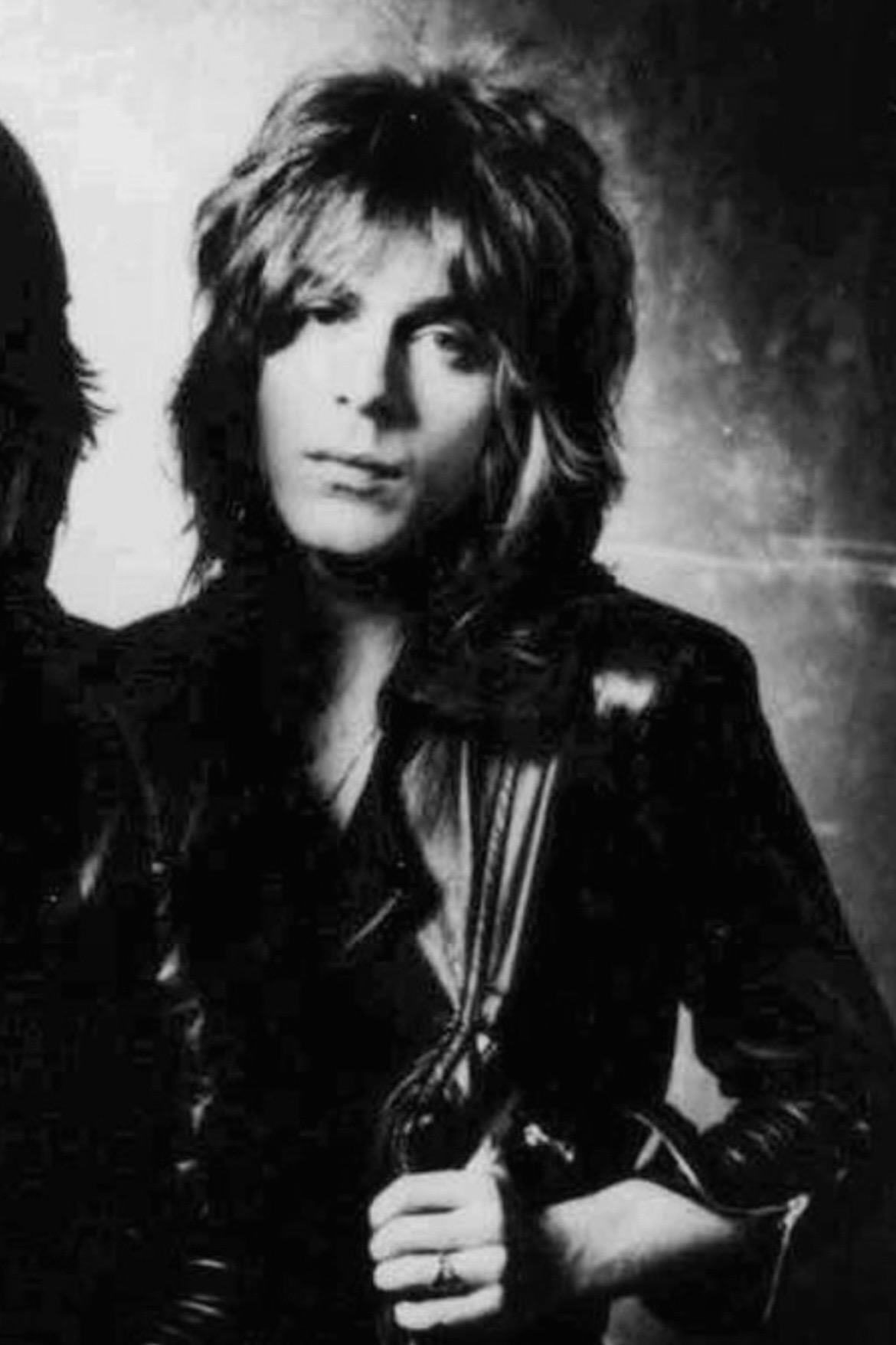
- Rhoads in 1980 with Blizzard of Ozz

Background information
- Born: Randall William Rhoads; December 6, 1956; Santa Monica, California, U.S.
- Died: March 19, 1982 (aged 25) Leesburg, Florida, U.S.
- Genres: Heavy metal; hard rock; neoclassical metal
- Occupation: Guitarist
- Years active: 1973–1982
- Formerly of: Ozzy Osbourne Band; Quiet Riot

Randall William Rhoads (December 6, 1956 – March 19, 1982) was an American guitarist. He was the co-founder and original guitarist of the heavy metal band Quiet Riot, and the guitarist and co-songwriter for Ozzy Osbourne's first two solo albums Blizzard of Ozz (1980) and Diary of a Madman (1981). Rhoads was posthumously inducted into the Rock and Roll Hall of Fame in 2021.

Pursuing an interest in classical guitar, Rhoads combined these influences with heavy metal, helping form a sub-genre later known as neoclassical metal. With Quiet Riot, he adopted a black-and-white polka-dot theme which became an emblem for the group. He reached his peak as the guitarist for Ozzy Osbourne's solo career, performing on tracks including "Crazy Train" and "Mr. Crowley" on the Blizzard of Ozz album. "Crazy Train" features one of the most well-known heavy metal guitar riffs.

He died in a plane crash while on tour with Osbourne in Florida in 1982. Despite his short career, Rhoads is regarded as a pivotal figure in metal music, credited with pioneering a fast and technical style of guitar soloing that largely defined the metal scene of the 1980s. He helped popularize various guitar techniques now common in heavy metal music, including two-handed tapping, vibrato bar dive bombs, and intricate scale patterns, drawing comparisons to his contemporary Eddie Van Halen. The Jackson Rhoads guitar was originally commissioned by him. He has been included in several published "Greatest Guitarist" lists, and has been cited by other prominent guitarists as a major influence.

== Early life and education ==
Rhoads was born on December 6, 1956, in Santa Monica, California, to Bill and Delores Rhoads. He was the youngest of three children. His parents were both music teachers. His brother Douglas was also a musician, who performed under the name "Kelle". In 1958, when Rhoads was 17 months old, his father left the family and remarried. All three children were subsequently raised by their mother, Delores. She had received a bachelor's degree in music from UCLA and had played piano professionally. She opened a music school in North Hollywood called Musonia to support the family and taught Randy to read sheet music. According to Kelle, she was responsible for changing a policy at UCLA according to which a woman could not be first chair in the brass section. The short instrumental "Dee", which Randy wrote and performed on Ozzy Osbourne's debut solo album Blizzard of Ozz, is a tribute to her.

The Rhoads family did not own a stereo, and the children created their own music at home to entertain themselves. Rhoads listened to the Beatles and the Rolling Stones as a child and would imitate their performances with his brother Kelle in the family garage. Rhoads began folk and classical guitar lessons at approximately age seven at his mother's music school. He became interested in rock guitar and began lessons at Musonia from Scott Shelly. Shelly soon approached Rhoads' mother to inform her that he could no longer teach her son, as Rhoads' knowledge of the electric guitar had exceeded his own. Rhoads also received piano lessons from his mother to help build his understanding of music theory.

Rhoads met future bandmate Kelly Garni while attending John Muir Middle School in Burbank, California, and the two became best friends. According to Garni, the pair were unpopular due to "the way we looked. Every time we showed up for school it was usually problematic, so we pretty much avoided it. We weren't nerds, we weren't jocks, we weren't dopers, we were just on our own." Rhoads' sister Kathy recalled, "People really gave him a hard time. They used to want to beat him up." Rhoads taught Garni how to play bass guitar, and together they formed a band called The Whore, rehearsing during the day at Rodney Bingenheimer's English Disco, a 1970s Hollywood nightspot. It was during this period that Rhoads learned to play lead guitar. "When I met him he didn't know how to play lead guitar yet at all. He was just starting to take lessons for it and really just riffing around," said Garni. Rhoads spent several months playing at backyard parties around the Los Angeles area in the mid-1970s.

The pair performed for a short time in a backing band for a vocalist remembered only as Smokey before forming a cover band, Violet Fox, (Note: Named after his mother's middle name, Violet) with Rhoads' older brother Kelle on drums. Violet Fox, which was together for approximately five months, staged several performances in the Grand Salon at Musonia. Among their setlist was "Mississippi Queen" by Mountain and songs from the Rolling Stones, Alice Cooper and David Bowie. After Violet Fox dissolved, Rhoads formed various other short-lived bands such as The Katzenjammer Kids (Note: Named for the comic strip The Katzenjammer Kids) and Mildred Pierce. (Note: Named for the book and film Mildred Pierce) The Katzenjammer Kids' lead vocalist would often wear dresses on stage, which sometimes led to violent reactions from the audience.

According to Garni, he and Rhoads frequently listened to Long Beach, California radio station KNAC because it was "the only radio station that would play anything of interest to us," and it was through KNAC that Rhoads discovered much of the music that influenced his playing. The home of a neighborhood friend with a high-quality stereo and large record collection became a regular hangout for the pair, and there they smoked pot and listened to more obscure hard rock music such as early Scorpions records.

Live bootleg recordings were very popular at that time, and Rhoads began to take note of the differences between studio recordings and the live versions, particularly the different licks guitarists incorporated when playing live. He began to memorize these licks and taught himself to play them. Rhoads' brother states that a July 11, 1971, Alice Cooper concert at the Long Beach Auditorium that the pair attended was a defining point in the guitarist's life. After the concert was over he noted:

Randy was mesmerized. He was catatonic, just staring at the stage. Later that night Randy said 'I can do this. I can look like this. I can be this.' Something clicked that night and I think that kind of showed him what he could do with his talent.

Garni concurs, calling Rhoads' discovery of Alice Cooper "a game changer." Guitarists Glen Buxton, Mick Ronson, and Leslie West were early influences on his playing. Rhoads was also an admirer of the Uriah Heep album, Demons and Wizards.

== Quiet Riot ==
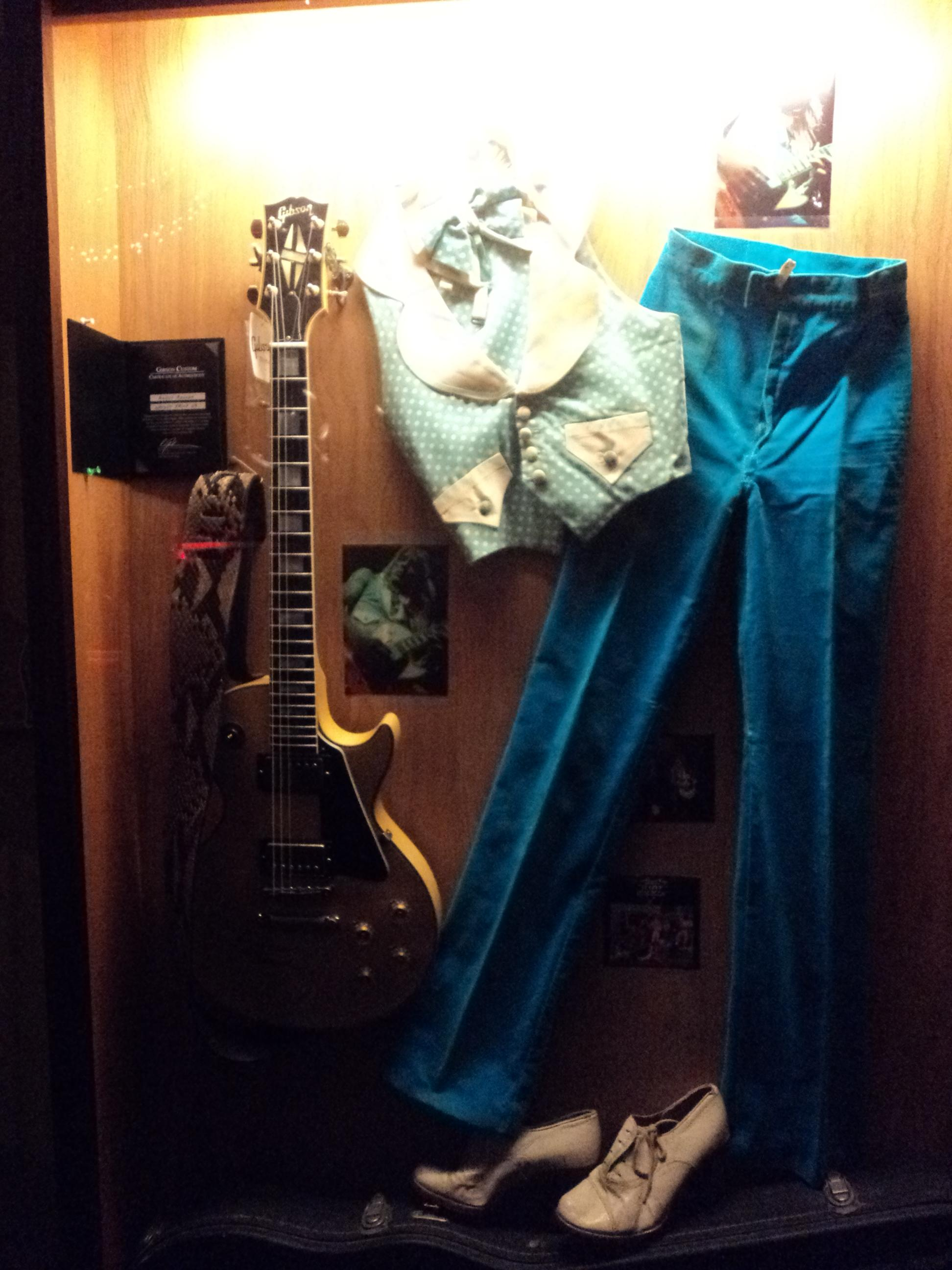
Rhoads' Quiet Riot gear on display

At age 16, Rhoads and Kelly Garni formed the band Little Women. At approximately the same time, Rhoads began teaching guitar in his mother's school during the day and playing live gigs at night. He graduated from Burbank High School, participating in a special program that allowed him to condense his studies and graduate early so he could teach guitar and pursue music full-time. Recruiting lead vocalist Kevin DuBrow and drummer Drew Forsyth, the band soon changed its name to Quiet Riot.

Forsyth had periodically played with Rhoads and Garni in the past, most notably in Mildred Pierce. DuBrow was an L.A. photographer who was not at all what Rhoads had in mind for his new band, and he was not well liked by his Quiet Riot bandmates, a situation that caused a great deal of tension within the band. Rhoads had envisioned a frontman in the vein of Alice Cooper or David Bowie, but DuBrow was persistent and would not take no for an answer. In the end, Rhoads and Garni decided that if nothing else, DuBrow shared their enthusiasm and he was hired.

Quiet Riot quickly became one of the most popular acts on the Los Angeles club circuit, and by late 1976 had secured a record deal with CBS/Sony Records. Fans began showing up at Quiet Riot shows wearing polka-dots, emulating the polka-dot vests and bow-ties that Rhoads wore onstage. He also had a polka-dot Flying V-style guitar custom made by a local luthier.

While the band had a strong following in Los Angeles, Quiet Riot and Quiet Riot II were released only in Japan. The relationship between DuBrow and Garni had also deteriorated completely during the recording of the band's second album, with potentially catastrophic results. After drunkenly firing a handgun through the ceiling and engaging in a fistfight with Rhoads, Garni hatched a plan to shoot and kill DuBrow at The Record Plant studio while recording the album. Rhoads was left with no choice but to fire his longtime friend and band co-founder.

== Ozzy Osbourne ==
In 1979, former Black Sabbath vocalist Ozzy Osbourne was in Los Angeles, attempting to form a new band. An acquaintance of Rhoads' from the LA club circuit, future Slaughter bassist Dana Strum, phoned Rhoads relentlessly to coax him into auditioning. Rhoads initially told Quiet Riot bandmate Rudy Sarzo that he was not really interested in auditioning, but finally agreed to go simply to get Strum off his back. Rhoads got the call for the audition just before his final show with Quiet Riot in September 1979. The day before Osbourne was scheduled to return to England, Rhoads agreed to audition for Osbourne at a Los Angeles studio.

=== Audition ===
Rhoads brought his Gibson Les Paul and a practice amp and started warming up. Osbourne, who was very drunk, said of the audition, "He played this fucking solo and I'm like, am I that fucking stoned or am I hallucinating or what the fuck is this?!" Osbourne has maintained that he immediately gave him the job. Rhoads recalled later, "I just turned up and did some riffs, and he said, 'You've got the gig'; I had the weirdest feeling, because I thought, 'You didn't even hear me yet'". After the audition, Rhoads returned to Musonia and told Sarzo that he had never actually met Osbourne, who was drunk and remained in the studio's control room the entire time. According to Rhoads' own account, it was Strum who emerged from the control room to inform him that he had the job. Rhoads was, however, scheduled to meet Osbourne the following night in his hotel room. In the years following, Osbourne maintained that his first encounter with Rhoads and the subsequent audition took place the following day at the hotel, and it seems that, in his inebriated state, he combined the two events in his mind. That Osbourne immediately began rehearsals with another guitarist upon returning to England, and did not mention Rhoads until after that guitarist had been fired, seems to confirm that his account of events is inaccurate.

Over the next couple of days following the audition, Rhoads, Osbourne, Strum, and drummer Frankie Banali jammed together in Los Angeles before Osbourne returned to England. Disillusioned with Quiet Riot's inability to land an American recording deal, Rhoads discussed with his mother the possibility of joining an already established band. When she asked him if he would accept "an offer like this one", he replied, "Of course!"

Upon returning to England, Osbourne was introduced in a pub to former Rainbow bassist Bob Daisley by a Jet Records employee named Arthur Sharpe, and the pair hit it off and decided to work together. Unhappy with the guitarist they were initially working with, Osbourne mentioned to Daisley that he had recently met a talented young guitarist in Los Angeles by the name of Randy Rhoads. The new group's management intended to keep the lineup all British and was reluctant to hire an unknown American guitarist, but manager Don Arden eventually relented. Rhoads flew to England only to return home a couple of days later, being turned away by English customs at Heathrow Airport when he did not have the necessary work permit. A representative from Jet Records was dispatched to clear the matter up but he never arrived, and Rhoads spent the night in a holding cell before being handcuffed and put on a plane back to the United States the next day. Osbourne subsequently called him to apologize, and arrangements were made for Rhoads to return to England with the proper paperwork. Rhoads flew to England on November 27, 1979, and met with Osbourne and Daisley at the Jet Records offices in London. The trio traveled by train to Osbourne's home, Bullrush Cottage in Staffordshire, which also housed a rehearsal space. It was here that Rhoads lived with Osbourne, his then-wife Thelma, and their two children, during his first weeks in England. Years later, Osbourne said in his autobiography that he could not understand why a musician as talented as Rhoads would want to get involved with a "bloated alcoholic wreck" like himself.

=== Blizzard of Ozz ===
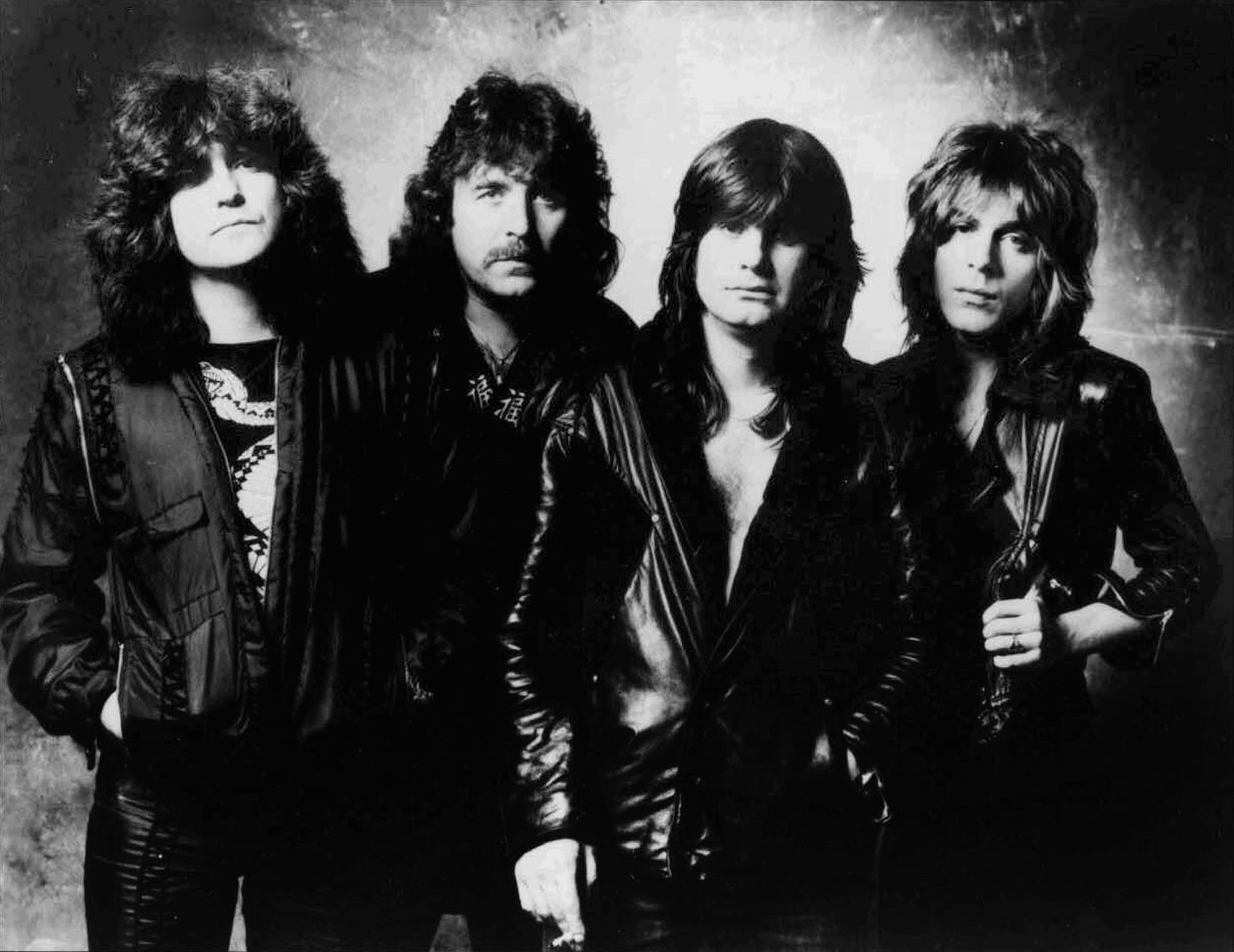
Rhoads with Ozzy Osbourne's band in 1980

After a short search, former Uriah Heep drummer Lee Kerslake was selected to complete the new band, then known as The Blizzard of Ozz. The group headed into the studio to record their debut album, titled Blizzard of Ozz. Rhoads' guitar playing had changed due to the level of freedom allowed by Osbourne and Daisley. His work with Quiet Riot had been criticized as being "dull" and did not rely on classical scales or arrangements. Propelled by Rhoads' neo-classical guitar work, Blizzard of Ozz proved an instant hit with rock fans, particularly in the US.

They released two singles from the album: "Mr. Crowley" and "Crazy Train". "Mr. Crowley" is in the key of D-minor, and "Crazy Train" is in F-sharp minor. Osbourne said years later, "One day Randy came to me and said that most heavy metal songs are written in an A to E chord structure. He said, 'Let's try to change that' ... so we made a rule that almost every number that we recorded on an album was never played in the same key." AllMusic reviewer Steve Huey described Crazy Train's main guitar riff as "a classic, making use of the full minor scale in a way not seen since Ritchie Blackmore's heyday with Deep Purple."

"Crazy Train" and "Mr. Crowley" placed 9th and 28th, respectively, on Guitar World's 100 Greatest Guitar Solos readers poll. "Crazy Train" placed 51 in Rolling Stone's 100 Greatest Guitar Songs of All Time list.

=== Diary of a Madman ===
Following a UK tour the band recorded another album, Diary of a Madman. In December 1981, Rhoads was voted "Best New Talent" by the readers of Guitar Player magazine and voted "Best Heavy Metal Guitarist" by the readers of UK-based Sounds magazine. At about this time, Rhoads reunited with Dubrow for a one-off Quiet Riot show at the Whisky a Go Go in West Hollywood during a brief trip home. Rhoads was subsequently warned by manager Sharon Arden not to do such a thing again.

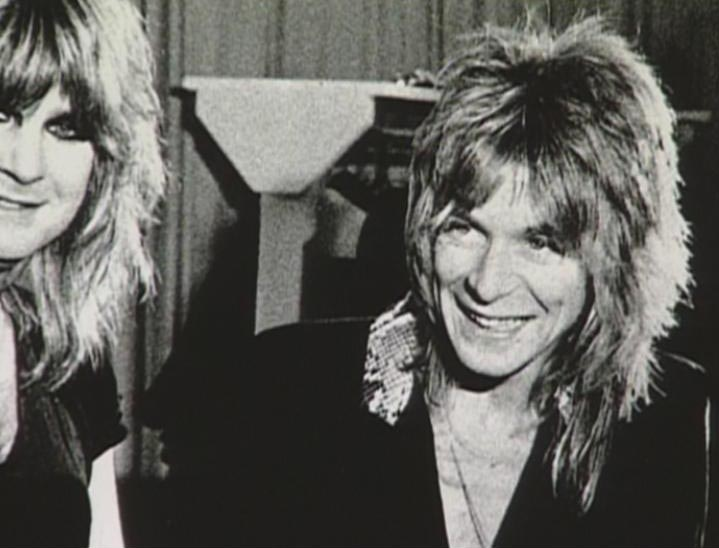
Rhoads with Osbourne, receiving the Best New Talent Award on December 30, 1981

During a break before leaving for their first US tour, both Kerslake and Daisley were suddenly fired by Sharon, the band's manager and Osbourne's future wife. For the US tour, ex-Black Oak Arkansas drummer Tommy Aldridge and bassist Rudy Sarzo – who had been Rhoads' bandmate in Quiet Riot – were hired. Diary of a Madman was released soon after in October 1981, and since Kerslake and Daisley were already out of the band, Aldridge and Sarzo's names and photos appeared on the album sleeve. Disputes over royalties performance and other intellectual property rights became a source of future court battles. Kerslake has maintained that Rhoads almost left Osbourne's band in late 1981 due to his displeasure with the firing of Kerslake and Daisley. "He didn't want to go [on tour with Osbourne]. We told him we were thrown out. He said he was going to leave the band as he did not want to leave us behind. I told him not to be stupid but thanks for the sentiment", the drummer later recalled.

On April 28, the band, then consisting of Osbourne, Rhoads, Sarzo, Aldridge, and touring keyboardist Lindsay Bridgwater, went to Channel 31 TV Studios in Rochester, New York, to film live performances of "I Don't Know", "Suicide Solution", "Mr. Crowley" and "Crazy Train.” These performances were broadcast on the After Hours TV show as live promo-videos. These recordings feature the only clear, professionally shot footage of Rhoads during his tenure with Osbourne. All four songs from this performance can be found on the Memoirs of a Madman DVD box set. "I Don't Know" and "Mr. Crowley" were uploaded to Osbourne's YouTube channel in 2015, with the latter being uploaded on March 19, the 33rd anniversary of Rhoads' death.

Around this time, Rhoads remarked to Osbourne, bandmates Aldridge and Sarzo, and friend Kelly Garni that he was considering leaving rock for a few years to earn a degree in classical guitar at UCLA. In the 1991 documentary film Don't Blame Me, Osbourne confirmed Rhoads' desire to earn the degree and stated that had he lived, he did not believe Rhoads would have stayed in his band. Friend and ex-Quiet Riot bassist Garni has speculated in interviews that if Rhoads had continued to play rock, he might have gone the route of more keyboard-driven rock, which had become popular through the 1980s. While on tour with Osbourne, Rhoads would seek out classical guitar tutors for lessons whenever possible.

According to Sarzo, at the time of his death Rhoads had already made the decision to part ways with Osbourne once his contractual obligations had been fulfilled. Though he had a good relationship with Osbourne, the vocalist's constant drug and alcohol abuse made day-to-day life on tour difficult for the members of his band. As the Diary of a Madman US tour progressed, Osbourne would often refuse to perform due to the lingering after-effects of the previous night's excesses, and only Sharon could talk him into taking the stage. Many shows were simply canceled, and Rhoads grew tired of the unpredictability.

Sarzo affirmed the final straw came when a plan was announced in February 1982 by Osbourne's management and record label to record a live album of Black Sabbath songs at Toronto's Maple Leaf Gardens later that year. Rhoads and bandmate Tommy Aldridge felt that they had established themselves as recording artists, and they regarded an album of cover songs to be a step backwards artistically and professionally. Thus, they refused to participate in the planned live recording. Osbourne viewed this decision as a betrayal, and the relationship between him and Rhoads became strained. Already drinking heavily, Osbourne escalated his drinking and began to tear the band apart. At one point he drunkenly fired the entire band, including Rhoads, though he later had no memory of doing so. He began taunting Rhoads with claims that the likes of Frank Zappa and Gary Moore were willing to replace him on the proposed live album. Osbourne's behavior soon convinced Rhoads to leave the band. He grudgingly agreed to perform on the live album with the stipulation that he would depart after fulfilling his contractual obligations to Jet Records, which consisted of one more studio album and subsequent tour. The proposed live album was scrapped upon the guitarist's sudden death weeks later, though the plan was quickly resurrected with the release of Speak of the Devil in November of that year.

On the other hand, his brother Kelle branded the story that Rhoads was going to leave Osbourne's band as "very untrue". He stated that his brother would have continued to work with Osbourne but did not plan to go on tour for awhile in order to get his degree in classical guitar studies.

== Death ==
Rhoads played his last show on Thursday, March 18, 1982, at the Knoxville Civic Coliseum. The next day, the band was traveling by bus to Rock Super Bowl XIV, a festival in Orlando, Florida. Osbourne recalled his final conversation with Rhoads involved the guitarist admonishing him over his heavy drinking. On the bus, Rhoads said to Osbourne: "You'll kill yourself, you know, one of these days."

"I've got a lot of work to do, and it makes you realize there's a lot of responsibility. This tour, I want to really get myself together and work harder. I'm really proud and honored. I don't want to stop there, you know."

— Rhoads, after receiving the Best New Talent Award from Guitar Player magazine on December 30, 1981

=== Plane crash ===
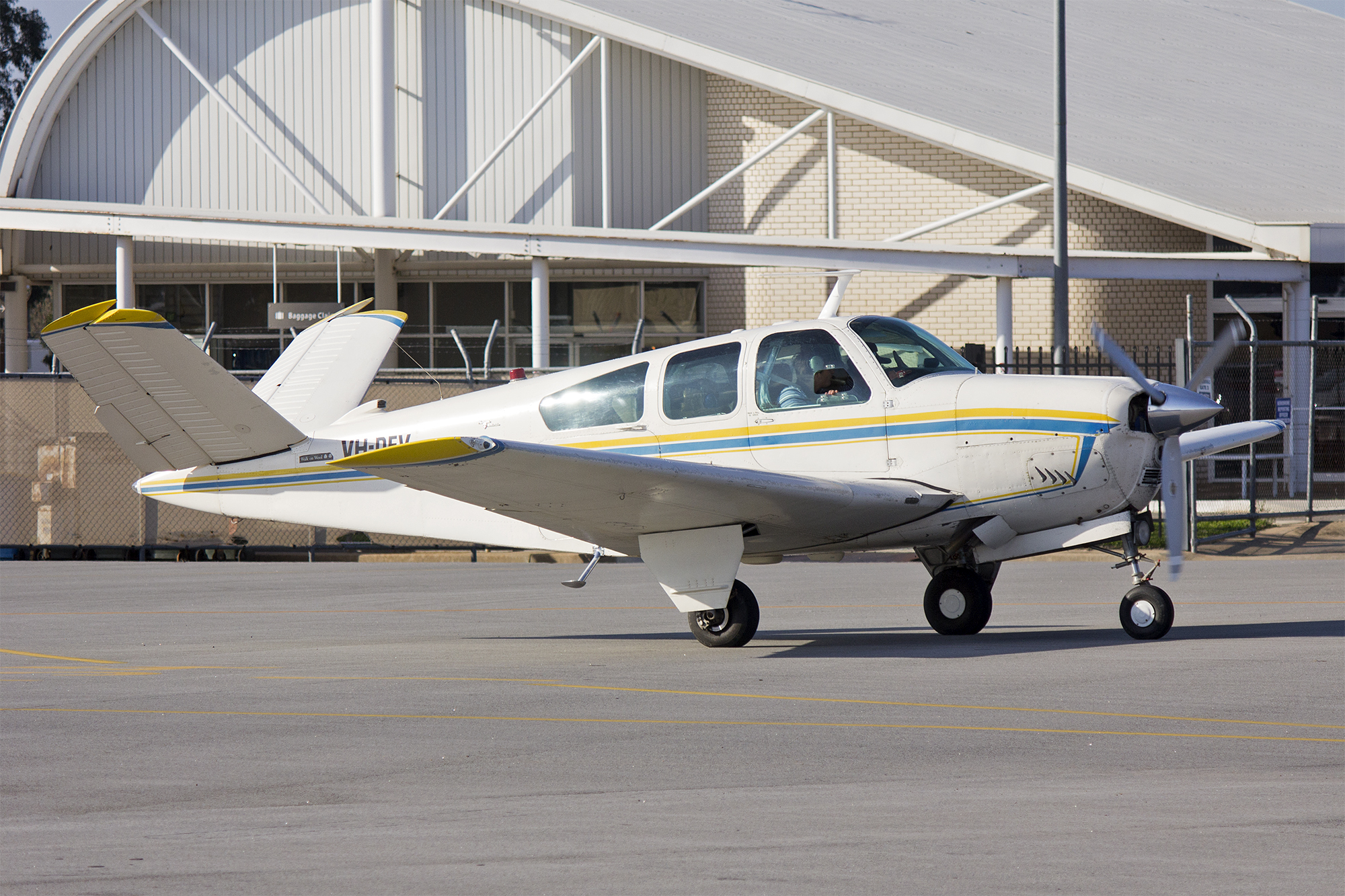
A 1955 Beechcraft Bonanza Model F35, similar to the aircraft in which Rhoads died

After driving much of the night, the bus stopped at Flying Baron Estates in Leesburg, Florida, to fix a malfunctioning air conditioning unit while Osbourne remained asleep. On the property, owned by the Calhoun Brothers tour bus company, there was an airstrip with helicopters and small planes. Without permission, tour bus driver and private pilot Andrew Aycock took a single-engine Beechcraft F35 plane registered to a Mike Partin. On the first flight, Aycock took keyboardist Don Airey and tour manager Jake Duncan with him as passengers. Duncan later revealed that Aycock "buzzed" the bus in an attempt to wake drummer Tommy Aldridge. The group then landed. The second flight had Rhoads and makeup artist Rachel Youngblood aboard. Rhoads had tried unsuccessfully to coax bassist Rudy Sarzo to join him on the flight; Sarzo chose to get some extra sleep instead.

During the second flight, more attempts were made to "buzz" the tour bus. Aycock succeeded in making two close passes, but botched the third attempt. At about 10 a.m., after being in the air for approximately five minutes, one of the plane's wings clipped the top of the tour bus, breaking the wing into two parts and sending the plane spiraling. The initial impact with the bus caused Rhoads' and Youngblood's heads to crash through the plane's windshield. The plane then severed the top of a pine tree and crashed into the garage of the mansion owned by Aycock's friend Jerry Calhoun, bursting into flames. Rhoads (25) was killed instantly, as were Aycock (36) and Youngblood (58). All three bodies were burned beyond recognition, and Rhoads was identified by dental records and personal jewelry. According to Sharon Osbourne, who was asleep in the bus and awoken by the crash, "They were all in bits, it was just body parts everywhere."

Airey was the only member of the band to witness the crash, as the rest were still asleep in the bus. In his account, he reported a struggle between Rhoads and Aycock in the cockpit, seconds before the crash:

I had my camera and was taking photos of the plane to give to Randy afterwards. I had my telephoto lens on and could tell that there was some sort of struggle going on aboard the plane. The wings were rapidly tipping from side to side. At one point the plane almost became perpendicular, no more than six feet off the ground. That's when I put down my camera and saw the plane right in front of me. I quickly crouched to avoid getting hit and looked over my shoulder and watched it clip the bus, crash into the tree and explode on impact into the garage.

As the band members on board the bus tried to figure out what had happened, Sarzo recalls side-stepping broken glass in his bare feet and looking through the gaping hole in the bus to see Duncan outside, rocking back and forth on the ground screaming "They're gone! They're gone!" Drummer Tommy Aldridge took a fire extinguisher from the bus and ran towards the crash site in a vain attempt to put out the fire. Duncan, who had been on board the first flight, explained that although he had been concerned about the pilot's behavior, there was no sense of foreboding:

It all seemed so innocent. When we arrived this morning, Andy offered Don and me to take us up. I must admit it got a bit scary when he started buzzing the bus trying to wake Tommy up. But after a few attempts we just landed. That was it.

Rhoads was afraid of flying and Youngblood had a bad heart. Rhoads originally had no intention of getting in the plane. Duncan explained how the guitarist ended up on the doomed flight:

Well, right after we landed Andy came up to me and told me that he was going to take Rachel up for a ride. And that being aware of her heart condition he assured me that he was just going to take it easy, circle the property a couple of times and not pull any crazy stunts. So when Randy heard that, he decided to join them so he could take some aerial shots with his camera.

=== Reaction ===
The remaining band and crew members were required to remain in Leesburg for an additional two days, until preliminary investigations were completed. Rhoads' brother-in-law flew from California to Leesburg to identify the guitarist's remains. Ozzy Osbourne's official statement to crash investigators was:

At approximately 9:00 a.m. on Friday, March 19, 1982, I was awoken from my sleep by a loud explosion. I immediately thought that we'd hit a vehicle on the road. I got out of the bed, screaming to my fiancée, Sharon, 'Get off the bus.' Meanwhile, she was screaming to everyone else to get off the bus. After getting out of the bus, I saw that a plane had crashed. I didn't know who was on the plane at the time. When we realized that our people were on the plane, I found it very difficult to get assistance from anyone to help. In fact, it took almost a half-hour before anyone arrived. One small fire engine arrived, that appeared to squirt three gallons of water over the inferno. We asked for further assistance, such as telephones, and didn't receive any further help. In the end, we finally found a telephone and Sharon phoned her father.

Bob Daisley and Lee Kerslake, who had recorded Blizzard of Ozz and Diary of a Madman with Rhoads and had been recently fired from Osbourne's band, were together in Houston, Texas, with Uriah Heep later that day when they got word of the accident. Kerslake recalled the moment he heard the news:

I was already sitting at the bar when Bob Daisley came into the bar. I turned and looked at Bob and said, 'Fuck, you have gone all white. What is wrong?' Bob said, 'Lee, there was a plane crash this morning and Randy was in it ... and he is dead.' That was it. Oh God, to hear that – I just turned and cried my eyes out. Bob and me were crying our eyes out over him, cause we loved him. He was such a lovely guy."

Rhoads' longtime girlfriend Jodi Raskin was in her car when she recalls hearing a block of songs from Blizzard of Ozz on the radio before the DJ announced the accident and the news that Rhoads had been killed. She was too distraught to continue driving. When close friend and future Quiet Riot drummer Frankie Banali heard the news, he quickly got in touch with Rudy Sarzo to make sure he was all right. He reported sensing that Sarzo was having a hard time continuing without Rhoads.

Black Sabbath was also touring the US at the time and heard the news on the radio. According to bassist Geezer Butler, they panicked, as they did not know if Osbourne had been one of the casualties or not. They quickly contacted Osbourne's management to find out what had happened.

In the hours following the crash, band members and crew called loved ones to assure them that they were safe, as news reports had not yet named the victims. Sarzo found a church near the hotel they had been taken to and went inside to pray. The church was empty aside from one man at the front, crying uncontrollably near the altar. Sarzo was moved by the display of overwhelming grief. Eventually the man cried out "Why? Why?" and Sarzo realized it was Osbourne.

When fellow guitarist Eddie Van Halen learned about the crash he sensed immediately that the pilot "had to have been fucked up when it happened," saying in an early 1982 radio interview, "You don't fly that low and smash into a crew bus and then hit the house. (The pilot) was jerking off. That's just plain stupidity. I feel so sorry for (Rhoads)."

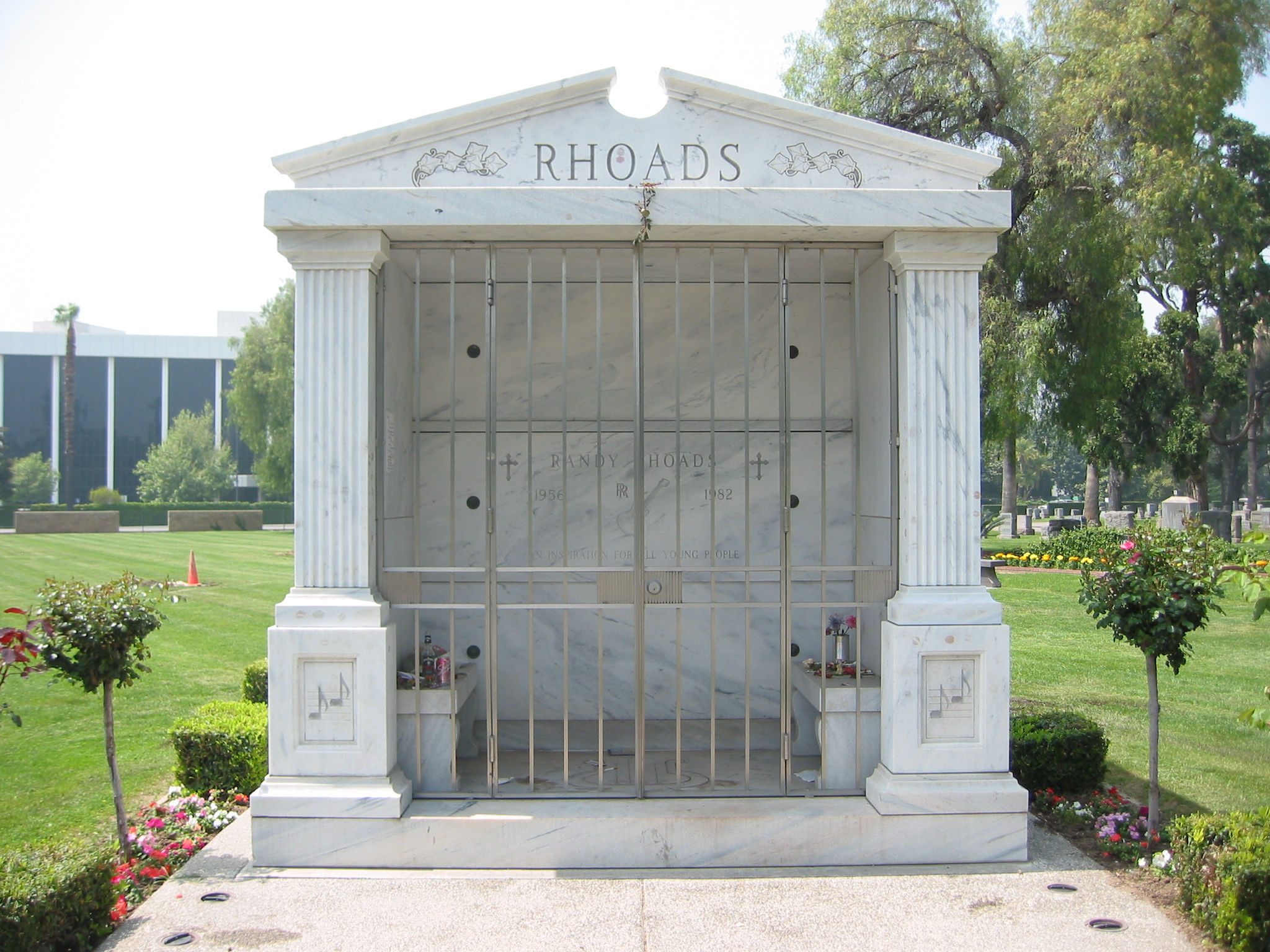
Rhoads' tomb in San Bernardino, California

Aycock's estranged wife Wanda had spent that last night on the bus. Band members reported that Aycock was attempting to reconcile with her. According to witnesses, Wanda emerged from inside the bus shortly after the second flight took off and was standing in the doorway watching the plane as Aycock made his final approach. Sarzo also mentions Aycock's troubled emotional state that day, worsened by the effects of the cocaine and sleep deprivation. Given the struggle in the cockpit, Sarzo theorized that Rhoads' actions in the last seconds of his life prevented a direct hit with the bus, which potentially could have killed the pilot's ex-wife and everyone else on board.

Ozzy Osbourne recalled that he and the band did not know Aycock was taking cocaine until the coroner's report. It was confirmed after autopsy that Aycock had tested positive for cocaine; Rhoads' toxicology test revealed only nicotine. The NTSB investigation determined that Aycock's aviation medical certificate had expired and it was reported that Aycock had been the pilot in another fatal crash in the United Arab Emirates six years earlier. Sharon had been aware of the prior crash, but had not informed anyone else on the tour. In the moments after the crash, she reportedly admonished tour manager Duncan for allowing their people into a plane with a pilot who had been using drugs all night, telling him "Don't you know that man had already killed one of the Calhouns' kids in a helicopter crash?"

Rhoads' funeral was held at the First Lutheran Church in Burbank, California. Serving as pallbearers at the funeral were Osbourne, Aldridge, Sarzo, and Rhoads' former Quiet Riot bandmate Kevin DuBrow. On his coffin were flowers and two photos of the guitarist, one showing Rhoads and Osbourne on stage in San Francisco. Rhoads is entombed at Mountain View Cemetery in San Bernardino, California. On his tomb is the inscription "An inspiration for all young people."

== Personal life ==
Rhoads was 5 feet 7 inches (170 cm) tall and weighed 105 pounds (48 kg). He was an avid collector of toy trains, and he traveled around England in search of them when he first arrived from the United States to record Blizzard of Ozz in 1980. He told Osbourne bandmate and close friend Rudy Sarzo that he and Sharon Arden were having a few celebratory drinks together in a hotel one night and ended up sleeping together. At the time, Ozzy Osbourne was trying to save his marriage to first wife Thelma, and Sharon was just his manager.

Osbourne has said that Rhoads did not use drugs and drank very little, preferring Anisette when he did drink. Osbourne says that while Rhoads did not like to party, he made up for it by smoking cigarettes heavily, saying "He could have won a gold medal in the Lung Cancer Olympics, could Randy Rhoads." Kelly Garni said that in the early days of Quiet Riot he and Rhoads experimented with marijuana and cocaine but "it really wasn't for us". He said Rhoads viewed cocaine as harmless at that time, and used cocaine only occasionally as a means of staying up all night and having fun, but developed a much more negative view of the drug after teaming up with Osbourne. Garni said that Osbourne's all-night drug binges taught the guitarist to avoid drugs and substance abuse, and he would typically go off alone to practice guitar or write letters home to his mother and girlfriend while Osbourne was getting high.

According to his brother Kelle, Rhoads was a "devout" Lutheran. (Note: Rhoads' mother died on November 11, 2015, at the age of 95.)

== Equipment ==
=== Guitars ===
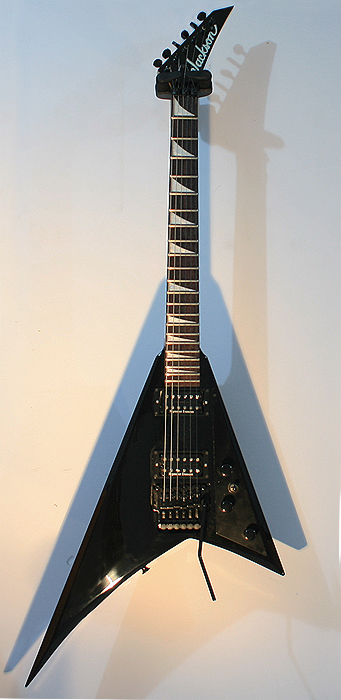
A black Jackson Rhoads

Shortly before leaving Quiet Riot in 1979, Rhoads presented hand-drawn pictures of a polka-dot Flying V-style guitar to Karl Sandoval, a California luthier. The guitar Sandoval built for Rhoads became one of the guitarist's trademark instruments. Rhoads' other guitars included:

- Ovation Tornado
- 1974 Gibson Les Paul Custom Alpine White (Rhoads' main and most recognizable guitar.)
- 1957 Gibson Les Paul Black Beauty (While mainly used for photoshoots, Rhoads possibly recorded some rhythm tracks on Diary of a Madman with this guitar.)
- Karl Sandoval "Polka Dot" V
- Jackson Rhoads White "Prototype" Concorde
- Jackson Rhoads Black with fixed bridge
- Fender Stratocaster

==== Strings ====
He preferred .009 gauge strings on Blizzard of Ozz and either .010 or .011 on Diary of a Madman.

- GHS Boomers, .009–.042 (Blizzard)
- GHS Boomers, .010–.046 (Diary)
- GHS Boomers, .011-.050 (Diary)

==== Pickups ====
Rhoads' pickups included:

- Stock pickups on 1974 Gibson Les Paul Custom.
- DiMarzio Super Distortion/PAF humbuckers on Karl Sandoval's Flying V.
- Seymour Duncan Distortion/Jazz models on Jacksons.

=== Effects ===
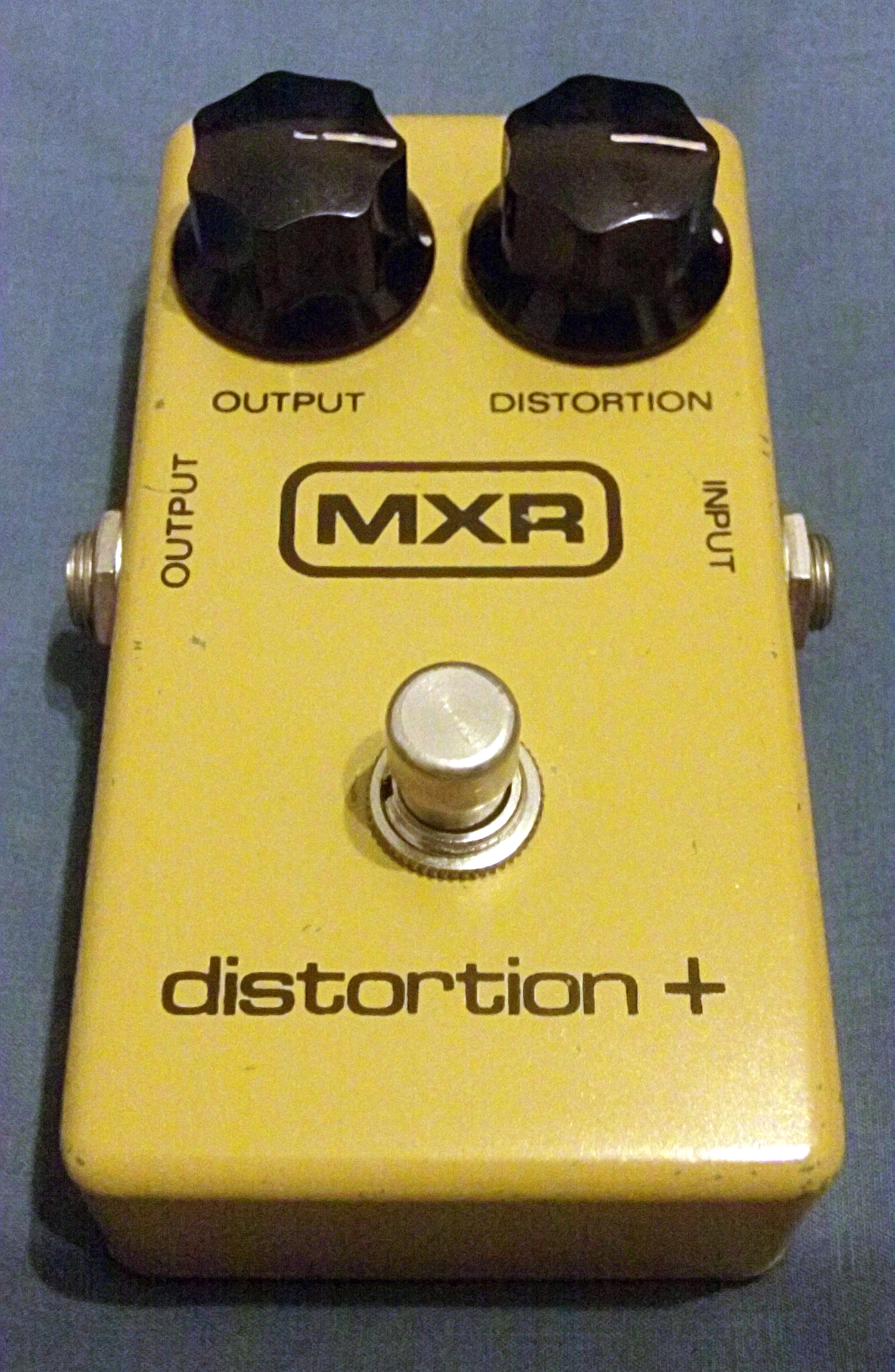
MXR Distortion +

Randy’s pedalboard was specially designed to have his main pedals all in one case like board that Ozzy called the “The Chip Pan” due to a lack of noise gate with a volume pedal added. Rhoads claimed "The MXR Distortion Plus is the only gadget I use a lot." His effects pedals included:

- Dunlop Cry Baby Wah-wah
- Roland:
  - RE-201 Space Echo
  - Volume Foot Pedal
- Korg echo
- MXR:
  - Distortion +
  - 10 Band EQ
  - Flanger
  - Stereo Chorus

=== Amplifiers ===
- 100 Watt Marshall model 1959 with Sylvania 6CA7 Power Tubes (photo document from Guitar Legends magazine)
- Marshall 4×12 Cabinets with Altec 417-8H speakers

=== 2019 equipment theft ===
In December 2019, Ozzy Osbourne offered a $25,000 reward for information leading to the recovery of several pieces of equipment, most of it once belonging to Rhoads, stolen from the premises of Musonia music school on the night of November 28, 2019.

Among the items stolen were a 1963 Harmony Rocket (Rhoads' first electric guitar), a Peavey Amp Head which was part of Quiet Riot's original stage gear, a very rare Randy Rhoads Series Marshall Head (Prototype No. 1 or 2 donated to the Rhoads family by the Marshall Company), and a Great Depression-era Silver French Besson trumpet originally owned by his mother, as well as numerous gifts from fans, memorabilia, all photos of Rhoads, and other "miscellaneous instruments". The items were recovered just a few days later from a dumpster.

== Legacy and influence ==
Rhoads placed 21st

on Rolling Stone Magazine's 100 Greatest Guitarists. He placed fourth on Guitar World Magazine's 100 Greatest Heavy Metal Guitarists, and 26th in Guitar World's 50 Fastest Guitarists list.

"In a way, Randy Rhoads is the Robert Johnson of metal. It's such a small catalog of stuff that has been so incredibly influential."

— Tom Morello

Rhoads' biggest influences as a guitarist were Leslie West, Ritchie Blackmore, Michael Schenker, Gary Moore, Charlie Christian, and John Williams.

In the years since his death Rhoads' work has been very influential within genres such as neoclassical metal, highly regarded by such players as Dimebag Darrell of Pantera, John Petrucci of Dream Theater, Zakk Wylde, Michael Romeo, Alexi Laiho of Children of Bodom, Mick Thomson of Slipknot, Paul Gilbert of Mr. Big, Buckethead, Michael Angelo Batio, Tom Morello of Rage Against the Machine, Mike McCready of Pearl Jam and Ray Toro of My Chemical Romance.

Aldridge, who Rhoads had regarded as his favorite drummer since seeing him perform on television with Black Oak Arkansas in the 1970s, has said that working with a musician as talented as Rhoads "was inspirational. It was life-changing". From a musical standpoint, he has said that playing with Rhoads was the high point of his career, stating "It was very exciting. From a musical perspective, it was probably the high-water mark of my career. Working with people like Randy Rhoads, guys like that, they kind of grab you by the scruff of your neck and lift you up to their level."

In 1987, Osbourne released a live album of their material together, in honor of Rhoads.

Rhoads' talent was not always met with such praise during his lifetime. Fellow guitarist Eddie Van Halen was somewhat dismissive of Rhoads' playing, saying in 1982 "Everything he did he learned from me" and "I don't really think he did anything that I haven't done", but said that "He was good". J. D. Considine of Rolling Stone Magazine was critical of his playing, referring to Rhoads in his review of Diary Of A Madman as "a junior-league Eddie Van Halen – bustling with chops but somewhat short on imagination". Years later, however, the magazine listed Rhoads as one of the greatest guitarists of all time.

=== Posthumous recognition ===
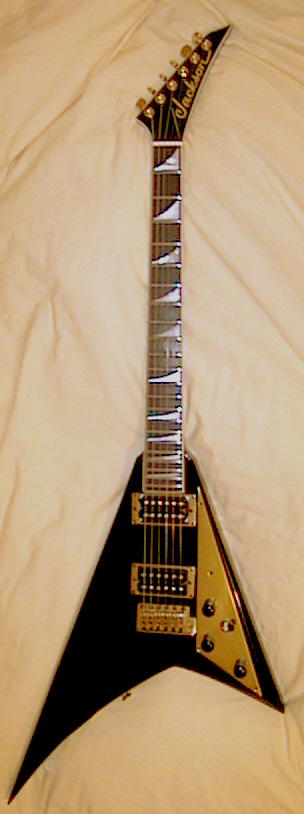
A Jackson Rhoads shortwing V

Just before his death Jackson Guitars created a signature model, the Jackson Randy Rhoads (though Rhoads had originally called his white pinstriped V "the Concorde"). Rhoads received one prototype – a black offset V hardtail that is the basis of today's RR line of Jackson guitars – but died before the guitar went into production.

Jackson Guitars released an exact replica of Rhoads' original white "shortwing" V. His original guitar was handled, photographed, and measured extensively by Jackson's luthiers to produce the most precise replica possible. The guitar comes with black gaffer's tape covering the top wing and the back of the guitar, just like Rhoads'. Only 60 of the guitars were manufactured, each with the symbolic price tag of $12,619.56, which is Rhoads' birthday. In 2010, Gibson Guitars announced a new custom shop signature guitar modeled after Rhoads' 1974 Les Paul Custom.

As a tribute to Rhoads, Marshall Amplification released the 1959RR at the NAMM Show in 2008. The amp is a limited-edition all-white Marshall Super Lead 100-watt head modeled after Rhoads' own Super Lead amp. Marshall engineers looked extensively at Rhoads' actual amplifier and made the 1959RR to those exact specifications, down to the special high-gain modification Rhoads requested when he visited the Marshall factory in 1980.

In April 2011, author Joel McIver announced the publication of the first fully comprehensive Rhoads biography, Crazy Train: The High Life and Tragic Death of Randy Rhoads, with a foreword written by Zakk Wylde and an afterword by Yngwie Malmsteen. In June 2012, Velocity Publishing Group announced a comprehensive Rhoads biography, written by Steven Rosen and Andrew Klein, and containing over 400 pages of material.

May 31, 2011, marked the 30th anniversary and remaster-release of Blizzard of Ozz and Diary of a Madman. Both albums were remastered and restored to their original state with Bob Daisley's bass and Lee Kerslake's drums intact. Blizzard has three bonus tracks: "You, Looking at Me, Looking at You", "Goodbye to Romance" (2010 Vocal & Guitar Mix), and "RR" (Randy Rhoads in-studio guitar solo). Originally, Diary was to include long fade-out versions of "You Can't Kill Rock and Roll", "Tonight", and "Diary of a Madman" (2010 Re-mix version), but they were not included in the re-issue. The Legacy version of Diary of a Madman includes a second CD called Ozzy Live, a live album pulled together from multiple performances on the 1981 Blizzard of Ozz tour. This performance features the same line-up as the Tribute album. Also included exclusively in the special box set are the 180-gram vinyl versions of the original albums, a 100-page coffee table book and the DVD Thirty Years After the Blizzard, that includes unreleased Rhoads video footage.

Producer Kevin Churko, who mixed the 2010 Ozzy Live CD, has stated that Epic Records has "a lot more in the vault" for future releases of Rhoads' material with Osbourne, as many of the band's live performances from that era were recorded.

Rhoads' mother, Delores Rhoads, created the Randy Rhoads Scholarship Endowment at California State University, Northridge that gives annual scholarships to guitar students in memory of her son.

On January 18, 2017, Rhoads was inducted into the Hall of Heavy Metal History for defining heavy metal lead guitar.

Rhoads was formally inducted into the Rock and Roll Hall of Fame on October 30, 2021, as a recipient of the Musical Excellence Award. Speaking (via video message) at the induction were Ozzy Osbourne, and guitarists Tom Morello of Rage Against the Machine, Zakk Wylde (formerly of Osbourne's band, and greatly influenced by Rhoads in his youth) and Kirk Hammett of Metallica.

Rhoads was named the 21st greatest guitarist of all time by Rolling Stone in 2023.

There is currently a petition to erect a statue of Randy in his hometown of Burbank, Ca. His family is involved in the project. The official website is www.RandyRhoadsMemorialProject.com

== Discography ==
=== With Quiet Riot ===
- Quiet Riot (1978)
- Quiet Riot II (1978)
- The Randy Rhoads Years (1993)

=== With Ozzy Osbourne ===
- Blizzard of Ozz (1980)
- Mr Crowley Live EP (1980)
- Diary of a Madman (1981)
- Tribute (1987)
- Ozzy Live (2011)

== Books ==
- Marshall, Wolf (1987). Ozzy Osbourne/Randy Rhoads Tribute. New York: Cherry Lane Music Company. ISBN 0-89524-347-4.
- Benoit, Tod (2009). Where Are They Buried? How Did They Die?. New York: Black Dog & Leventhal. ISBN 978-1-57912-822-7.
- Fischer, Peter (2006). Masters of Rock Guitar 2: The New Generation. Mel Bay. ISBN 978-3-89922-078-0.
- McIver, Joel (2011). Crazy Train: The High Life and Tragic Death of Randy Rhoads. Jawbone Press. ISBN 978-1906002374.
- Hurwitz, Tobias (1999). Guitar Shop – Getting Your Sound: Handy Guide. Alfred Publishing. ISBN 978-0-88284-956-0.
- Osbourne, Ozzy (2010). I Am Ozzy. Grand Central Publishing. ISBN 978-0446569903.
- Prato, Greg (2025). Bang Your Head, Feel the Noize: The Quiet Riot Story. Kindle Direct. ISBN 979-8308354222.
- Prown, Pete; Sharken, Lisa (2003). Gear Secrets of the Guitar Legends: How to Sound Like Your Favorite Players. Hal Leonard Corporation. ISBN 978-0-87930-751-6.
- Sarzo, Rudy (2016). Off the Rails: Aboard the Crazy Train in the Blizzard of Ozz. Createspace. ISBN 978-1537437460.
- Schroedl, Jeff (2014). Hal Leonard Guitar Tab Method. Hal Leonard Corporation. ISBN 9781495009068.

Randy Rhoads Biography - Velocity Books. Authors Andrew Klein and Steven Rosen (2012) ISBN 1450727212
