= Rusper =

Village and parish in West Sussex, England

Coordinates: 51.12186°N 0.27869°W

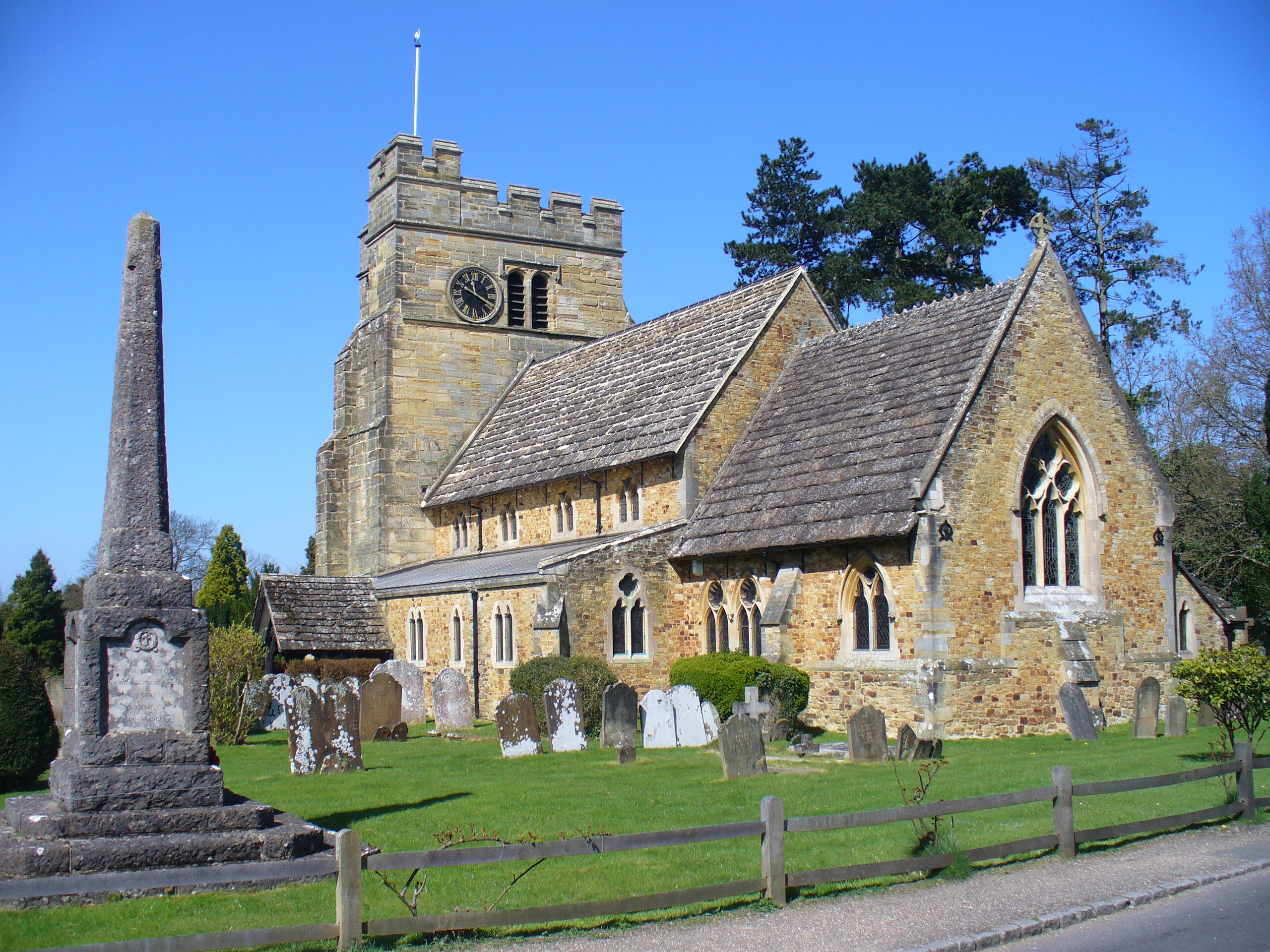
- St Mary Magdalene's Church

- Location within West Sussex
- Area: 25.89 km^{2} (10.00 sq mi)
- Population: 1,389 2001 Census
  - Density: 54/km^{2} (140/sq mi)
- OS grid reference: TQ205372
  - London: 27 miles (43 km) NNE
- Civil parish: Rusper
- District: Horsham
- Shire county: West Sussex
- Region: South East
- Country: England
- Sovereign state: United Kingdom
- Post town: HORSHAM
- Postcode district: RH12
- Dialling code: 01293
- Police: Sussex
- Fire: West Sussex
- Ambulance: South East Coast
- UK Parliament: Horsham

Rusper is a village and civil parish in the Horsham District of West Sussex, England.

== Overview ==
It lies 4.1 miles (6.6 km) north of the town of Horsham and 4.2 miles (6.8 km) west of Crawley. Rusper is the centre of Rusper Parish which covers most of the northern area between Horsham and Crawley. Rusper is governed by the Horsham District Council based in Horsham. The parish population at the 2001 census was 1,389 people.

It has a range of local services (mainly located on the High Street) such as a village shop and post office, a residential care home, a park, a church, a recreational sports area consisting of a Football pitch and two Tennis courts (one with basketball hoops), a hotel, two pubs The Plough and The Star, a village hall, and Rusper Primary School, built in 1872.

Rusper is close to London Gatwick Airport, which is only five miles away and lies under the flight path. It is on the watershed between the River Arun to the west and the River Mole to the east, with predominantly weald clay soils.

Rusper Priory, a priory of Benedictine nuns, was established in the parish c.1200.

The Parish Church of St Mary Magdalene is a Grade I listed building with a good medieval tower. Rusper is the eponymous village in Five Years Hell in a Country Parish by Reverend Edward Fitzgerald Synnott, Rector of the place, published in 1920. Plagued by endless gossip-mongering, anonymous and begging letters and outrage from the wealthier of his flock at his assertion that all men are equal in the sight of God, he was subject to a serious spiteful campaign and eventually sent for trial for misconduct. He was found not guilty on a charge of immorality by the Chichester Consistory Court in January 1920. He stayed there another thirteen years.

Ridge Farm Studio was a residential recording studio, from 1975 to 2003.
