= Bark at the Moon Tour =

1983–1985 concert tour by Ozzy Osbourne

- Tour by Ozzy Osbourne
- Poster to the concert in New York City
- Location: Europe; North America; Asia; South America
- Associated album: Bark at the Moon
- Start date: November 10, 1983
- End date: January 19, 1985
- Legs: 5
- No. of shows: 132

Ozzy Osbourne concert chronology
- Speak of the Devil Tour (1982–1983); Bark at the Moon Tour (1983–1985); The Ultimate Sin Tour (1986)

The Bark at the Moon Tour was a tour by Ozzy Osbourne from 1983 to 1985, supporting his album Bark at the Moon.

== Background ==
Mötley Crüe and Waysted were support acts for the tour. Osbourne witnessed Mötley Crüe perform at the US Festival in May 1983 and chose them as his opening act for his upcoming world tour. Osbourne has been credited for the fame and success Mötley Crüe received going forward in their careers, and also the popularity of their hedonistic lifestyle.

== Personnel ==
Europe and USA (to Feb 1984)

- Ozzy Osbourne – vocals
- Jake E. Lee – guitar
- Bob Daisley – bass
- Carmine Appice – drums
- Don Airey – keyboards

USA and Asia (Feb 1984 onwards)

- Ozzy Osbourne – vocals
- Jake E. Lee – guitar
- Bob Daisley – bass
- Tommy Aldridge – drums
- Don Airey – keyboards

== Tour schedule and personnel changes ==
In late 1983 Carmine Appice toured with Ozzy Osbourne in support of his Gold-selling Bark at the Moon album, but shortly afterward was fired from the backing group. Though Osbourne had a good relationship with him, the singer's wife and manager Sharon detested Appice, and the decision to fire him was strictly hers.

== Set lists ==
Songs played overall

"O Fortuna" (Carl Orff song) [Introduction]

1. "I Don't Know"
2. "Mr Crowley"
3. "Over the Mountain"
4. "Rock 'N' Roll Rebel"
5. "Bark at the Moon"
6. "Revelation Mother Earth"
7. "Steal Away the Night"
8. "So Tired"
9. "Suicide Solution" [and Jake E. Lee guitar solo]
10. "Centre of Eternity"
11. Carmine Appice/Tommy Aldridge drum solo
12. "Flying High Again"
13. "Iron Man" (Black Sabbath cover) and "Crazy Train"

Encore

14. "Paranoid" (Black Sabbath cover)
15. "Goodbye to Romance"

Typical setlist

"O Fortuna" (Carl Orff song) [Introduction]

1. "I Don't Know"
2. "Mr Crowley"
3. "Rock 'N' Roll Rebel"
4. "Bark at the Moon"
5. "Revelation Mother Earth"
6. "Steal Away the Night"
7. "Suicide Solution" [and Jake E. Lee guitar solo]
8. "Centre of Eternity"
9. Carmine Appice/Tommy Aldridge drum solo
10. "Flying High Again"
11. "Iron Man" (Black Sabbath cover) and "Crazy Train"

Encore

12. "Paranoid" (Black Sabbath cover)

== Tour dates ==
Date	City	Country	Venue
Europe
November 10, 1983	Leicester	England	De Montfort Hall
November 11, 1983	Ipswich	England	Gaumont Theatre
November 12, 1983	Leeds	England	University of Leeds Refectory
November 14, 1983	Bristol	England	Colston Hall
November 15, 1983	Derby	England	Derby Assembly Rooms
November 16, 1983	Sheffield	England	Sheffield City Hall
November 18, 1983	Newcastle	England	Mayfair Ballroom
November 19, 1983	Glasgow	Scotland	The Apollo
November 20, 1983	Edinburgh	Scotland	Edinburgh Playhouse
November 22, 1983	Birmingham	England	Birmingham Odeon
November 23, 1983	Birmingham	England	Birmingham Odeon
~~November 24, 1983~~	~~Liverpool~~	England	~~Royal Court Theatre~~
November 26, 1983	Manchester	England	Manchester Apollo
November 27, 1983	Stoke	England	Victoria Hall
November 29, 1983	London	England	Hammersmith Odeon
November 30, 1983	London	England	Hammersmith Odeon
December 1, 1983	Birmingham	England	Birmingham Odeon
~~December 3, 1983~~	~~Copenhagen~~	~~Denmark~~	~~The Salt Warehouse~~
December 4, 1983	Lund	Sweden	Olympen
December 5, 1983	Stockholm	Sweden	Draken
December 6, 1983	Stockholm	Sweden	Draken
December 8, 1983	Bremen	West Germany	Bremen City Hall
December 10, 1983	Zwolle	Netherlands	IJsselhallen
December 12, 1983	Munich	West Germany	Löwenbräukeller
December 13, 1983	Sindelfingen	West Germany	Sindelfingen Exhibition Hall
December 14, 1983	Offenbach	West Germany	Stadthalle Offenbach
December 15, 1983	Brussels	Belgium	Forest National
December 17, 1983	Dortmund	West Germany	Westfalenhallen (Rock Pop)
December 18, 1983	Dortmund	West Germany	Westfalenhallen (Rock Pop)
December 19, 1983	Ludwigshafen	West Germany	Friedrich-Ebert-Halle
December 20, 1983	Neunkirchen	West Germany	Hemmerleinhalle
December 22, 1983	Paris	France	Espace Balard
North America (1st leg) Supported by Mötley Crüe (January 10–March 24; May 15–28, 1984) Supported by Ratt (March 31-April 30, 1984)
January 10, 1984	Portland	United States	Cumberland County Civic Center
January 12, 1984	Glens Falls	United States	Glens Falls Civic Center
January 13, 1984	Binghamton	United States	Broome County Veterans Memorial Arena
January 15, 1984	Philadelphia	United States	Spectrum
January 16, 1984	Philadelphia	United States	Spectrum
January 17, 1984	Worcester	United States	The Centrum
January 18, 1984	Bethlehem	United States	Stabler Arena
January 20, 1984	Providence	United States	Providence Civic Center
January 21, 1984	Boston	United States	Boston Garden
January 22, 1984	East Rutherford	United States	Brendan Byrne Arena
January 24, 1984	New Haven	United States	New Haven Coliseum
January 25, 1984	Hempstead	United States	Nassau Coliseum
January 27, 1984	Rochester	United States	Rochester Community War Memorial Arena
January 28, 1984	Buffalo	United States	Buffalo Memorial Auditorium
January 30, 1984	New York City	United States	Madison Square Garden
February 1, 1984	Landover	United States	Capital Centre
February 2, 1984	Pittsburgh	United States	Pittsburgh Civic Arena
February 4, 1984	Indianapolis	United States	Market Square Arena
February 5, 1984	Cincinnati	United States	Riverfront Coliseum
February 7, 1984	Richfield	United States	Richfield Coliseum
February 8, 1984	Lexington	United States	Rupp Arena
February 9, 1984	St. Louis	United States	St. Louis Arena
February 11, 1984	Kansas City	United States	Kansas City Municipal Auditorium
February 12, 1984	Tulsa	United States	Tulsa Convention Center
February 13, 1984	Norman	United States	Lloyd Noble Center
February 14, 1984	Amarillo	United States	Amarillo Civic Center
February 15, 1984	San Antonio	United States	HemisFair Arena
February 16, 1984	Dallas	United States	Reunion Arena
February 17, 1984	Houston	United States	The Summit
February 19, 1984	New Orleans	United States	Lakefront Arena
February 20, 1984	Mobile	United States	Mobile Municipal Auditorium (Carmine's last show)
~~February 22, 1984~~	~~Jacksonville~~	United States	~~Jacksonville Coliseum~~
~~February 23, 1984~~	~~Lakeland~~	United States	~~Lakeland Civic Center~~
~~February 24, 1984~~	~~Pembroke Pines~~	United States	~~Hollywood Sportatorium~~
~~February 26, 1984~~	~~Birmingham~~	United States	~~Boutwell Memorial Auditorium~~
~~February 27, 1984~~	~~Atlanta~~	United States	~~Omni Coliseum~~
~~March 1, 1984~~	~~Memphis~~	United States	~~Mid-South Coliseum~~
March 3, 1984	Rosemont	United States	Rosemont Horizon (Tommy Aldridge's first show)
March 4, 1984	Rosemont	United States	Rosemont Horizon (Tommy Aldridge's first show)
March 5, 1984	Milwaukee	United States	MECCA Arena
March 6, 1984	Detroit	United States	Joe Louis Arena
March 8, 1984	Madison	United States	Dane County Veterans Memorial Coliseum
March 9, 1984	Bloomington	United States	Met Center
March 10, 1984	Omaha	United States	Omaha Civic Arena
March 12, 1984	Denver	United States	McNichols Sports Arena
March 13, 1984	Albuquerque	United States	Tingley Coliseum
March 14, 1984	Tucson	United States	Tucson Community Center Arena
March 16, 1984	Las Vegas	United States	Thomas and Mack Center
March 18, 1984	Salt Lake City	United States	Salt Palace (Bark at the Moon Live)
March 19, 1984	Boise	United States	BSU Pavilion
March 20, 1984	Spokane	United States	Spokane Coliseum
March 22, 1984	Seattle	United States	Seattle Center Coliseum
March 23, 1984	Vancouver	Canada	Pacific Coliseum
March 24, 1984	Portland	United States	Veterans Memorial Coliseum
March 27, 1984	Reno	United States	Lawlor Events Center
March 28, 1984	Daly City	United States	Cow Palace
March 29, 1984	Fresno	United States	Selland Arena
March 31, 1984	San Diego	United States	San Diego Sports Arena
April 1, 1984	Phoenix	United States	Arizona Veterans Memorial Coliseum
April 2, 1984	Irvine	United States	Irvine Meadows Amphitheatre
April 4, 1984	Long Beach	United States	Long Beach Arena
April 5, 1984	Long Beach	United States	Long Beach Arena
North America (2nd leg)
April 21, 1984	Grand Forks	United States	Ralph Engelstad Arena
April 22, 1984	Duluth	United States	Duluth Arena
April 24, 1984	Toledo	United States	Toledo Sports Arena
April 25, 1984	Toronto	Canada	Maple Leaf Gardens
April 26, 1984	Montreal	Canada	The Mustache Club
April 27, 1984	Montreal	Canada	Montreal Forum
April 28, 1984	Quebec City	Canada	Quebec Coliseum
April 30, 1984	Ottawa	Canada	Ottawa Civic Center
May 1, 1984	Syracuse	United States	Onondaga County War Memorial Arena
May 2, 1984	Worcester	United States	The Centrum
May 3, 1984	St. Louis	United States	Kiel Auditorium
May 4, 1984	Kansas City	United States	Kemper Arena
May 5, 1984	Charleston	United States	Charleston Civic Center
May 6, 1984	Hampton	United States	Hampton Coliseum
May 8, 1984	Greensboro	United States	Greensboro Coliseum
May 9, 1984	Greenville	United States	Greenville Memorial Auditorium
May 11, 1984	Charlotte	United States	Charlotte Coliseum
May 12, 1984	Fayetteville, North Carolina	United States	Cumberland County Memorial Auditorium
May 13, 1984	Knoxville	United States	Knoxville Civic Coliseum
May 15, 1984	Memphis	United States	Mid-South Coliseum
May 16, 1984	Nashville	United States	Nashville Municipal Auditorium
May 18, 1984	Jacksonville	United States	Jacksonville Coliseum
May 19, 1984	Pembroke Pines	United States	Hollywood Sportatorium
May 20, 1984	Tampa	United States	The Sun Dome
May 22, 1984	Atlanta	United States	Omni Coliseum
May 23, 1984	Birmingham	United States	Boutwell Memorial Auditorium
May 25, 1984	Louisville	United States	Cardinal Stadium
May 26, 1984	Peoria	United States	Peoria Civic Center
May 27, 1984	Pine Grove	United States	Timber Ridge Ski Area (American Rock Festival 1984)
May 28, 1984	Des Moines	United States	Iowa State Fairgrounds Grandstand (Iowa Jam 1984)
May 30, 1984	Rockford	United States	Rockford MetroCenter
May 31, 1984	Dayton	United States	Hara Arena
June 1, 1984	Fort Wayne	United States	Allen County War Memorial Coliseum
June 3, 1984	Jackson	United States	Mississippi Coliseum
June 6, 1984	Biloxi	United States	Mississippi Coast Coliseum
June 8, 1984	Houston	United States	Astrodome (Texxas Jam)
June 10, 1984	Dallas	United States	Cotton Bowl (Texxas Jam)
Asia
June 28, 1984	Tokyo	Japan	Tokyo Kōsei Nenkin Kaikan
June 29, 1984	Tokyo	Japan	Tokyo Kōsei Nenkin Kaikan
June 30, 1984	Nagoya	Japan	Nagoya Civic Assembly Hall
July 2, 1984	Osaka	Japan	Festival Hall
July 3, 1984	Fukuoka	Japan	Fukuoka Sunpalace
July 5, 1984	Tokyo	Japan	Nakano Sunplaza
July 6, 1984	Tokyo	Japan	Nakano Sunplaza
July 7, 1984	Tokyo	Japan	Shibuya Public Hall
North America
August 4, 1984	San Juan	Puerto Rico	Hiram Bithorn Stadium
Europe
Monsters of Rock
August 18, 1984	Castle Donington	England	Donington Park
Breaking Sound Festival
August 29, 1984	Paris	France	Bourget Rotunda
August 30, 1984	Paris	France	Bourget Rotunda
Monsters of Rock
September 1, 1984	Karlsruhe	West Germany	Wildparkstadion
September 2, 1984	Nuremberg	West Germany	Zeppelin Field
Rock in Rio
January 16, 1985	Rio de Janeiro	Brazil	Rio Rock City (Bob, Tommy and Don's last shows)
January 19, 1985	Rio de Janeiro	Brazil	Rio Rock City (Bob, Tommy and Don's last shows)
