= World Slavery Tour =

1984–1985 concert tour by Iron Maiden

- Tour by Iron Maiden
- Official tour advertisement for the band's performance at Gothenburg, 3 November 1984
- Associated album: Powerslave
- Start date: 9 August 1984
- End date: 5 July 1985
- No. of shows: 189 in total (197 scheduled)

Iron Maiden concert chronology
- World Piece Tour (1983); World Slavery Tour (1984–1985); Somewhere on Tour (1986–1987)

The World Slavery Tour was a concert tour by the English heavy metal band Iron Maiden in support of their fifth album, Powerslave, beginning in Warsaw, Poland on 9 August 1984 and ending in Irvine, California on 5 July 1985.

== Background ==
The tour was notorious for being the band's most arduous to date- although it was very successful, the band were left exhausted by its end in 1985 and demanded a break for the rest of the year before starting work on Somewhere In Time in 1986. The band's lead vocalist, Bruce Dickinson, has since explained that "I never thought it was going to end ... I began to feel like I was a piece of machinery, like I was part of the lighting rig." Overall, the tour lasted 331 days, during which the band performed 189 gigs, the longest tour dates of their career.

The tour also saw the band play to one of the largest crowds of their career, approximately 350,000 people at the first edition of the Brazilian rock festival Rock in Rio in 1985.

The tour was notable for its use of props, such as the sarcophagi, 30-foot mummified Eddie and extensive pyrotechnics. Steve Harris referred to it as "probably the best stage show we ever did," and Dickinson commented that, "You could set it up in small theatres or big arenas and it would always look fantastic." The band's 2008–2009 tour, Somewhere Back in Time World Tour, featured a stage set which largely emulated the World Slavery Tour.

Iron Maiden's first full-length live album Live After Death was recorded during the band's four shows at London's Hammersmith Odeon in October 1984 and four shows at Long Beach Arena in Long Beach, California in March 1985. A video entitled Behind the Iron Curtain documented the band's first shows in Poland, Hungary, and Yugoslavia in August 1984, as they were regarded as the first rock act to take a full stage show into the Eastern Bloc.

An 18-year-old Iron Maiden fan, Daniel Pitre, fell 100 ft to his death from a catwalk in the press area of the Colisée de Québec during the Quebec City show. The band learned about the death only after the show.

== Tour dates ==
List of 1984 concerts
| Date | City | Country | Venue | Opening Act |
|---|---|---|---|---|
| 9 August 1984 | Warsaw | Poland | Hala Torwar | —N/a |
| 10 August 1984 | Łódź | Poland | Hala MOSiR | —N/a |
| 11 August 1984 | Poznań | Poland | Hala Arena | —N/a |
| 12 August 1984 | Wrocław | Poland | Hala Ludowa | —N/a |
| 14 August 1984 | Zabrze | Poland | Sporthall Makoszowy | —N/a |
| 16 August 1984 | Zeltweg | Austria | Aichfeldhalle Sportzentrum | —N/a |
| 17 August 1984 | Budapest | Hungary | Budapest Sportcsarnok | Pokolgép; P. Box |
| 18 August 1984 | Belgrade | Yugoslavia | Sajam Exhibition Centre | Warriors |
| 19 August 1984 | Ljubljana | Yugoslavia | Dvorana Tivoli | Warriors |
| 22 August 1984 | Arma di Taggia | Italy | Ex-Caserma Ravelli | Accept |
| 25 August 1984 | Annecy | France | Parc des Expositions | Accept |
| 26 August 1984 | Palavas-les-Flots | France | Arennes de Palavas | Accept |
| 29 August 1984 | San Sebastián | Spain | Velódromo de Anoeta | Accept |
| 31 August 1984 | Porto | Portugal | Pavilhao Infante de Sagres | Accept |
| 1 September 1984 | Cascais | Portugal | Pavilhão Dramático | Accept |
| 3 September 1984 | Madrid | Spain | Estadio Román Valero | Accept |
| 5 September 1984 | Barcelona | Spain | Palau dels Esports de Barcelona | Accept |
| 7 September 1984 | Toulouse | France | Palais des Sports | Accept |
| 8 September 1984 | Bordeaux | France | Palais des Sports | Accept |
| 11 September 1984 | Glasgow | Scotland | Glasgow Apollo | Waysted |
| 12 September 1984 | Aberdeen | Scotland | Capitol Theatre | Waysted |
| 13 September 1984 | Edinburgh | Scotland | Edinburgh Playhouse | Waysted |
| 15 September 1984 | Newcastle | England | Newcastle City Hall | Waysted |
| 16 September 1984 | Newcastle | England | Newcastle City Hall | Waysted |
| 17 September 1984 | Sheffield | England | Sheffield City Hall | Waysted |
| 18 September 1984 | Ipswich | England | Gaumont Theatre | Waysted |
| 20 September 1984 | Leicester | England | De Montfort Hall | Waysted |
| 21 September 1984 | Oxford | England | Apollo Theatre Oxford | Waysted |
| 22 September 1984 | St Austell | England | Cornwall Coliseum | Waysted |
| 23 September 1984 | Bristol | England | Bristol Hippodrome | Waysted |
| 25 September 1984 | Manchester | England | Manchester Apollo | Waysted |
| 26 September 1984 | Manchester | England | Manchester Apollo | Waysted |
| 27 September 1984 | Hanley | England | Victoria Hall | Waysted |
| 29 September 1984 | Nottingham | England | Nottingham Royal Concert Hall | Waysted |
| 30 September 1984 | Cardiff | Wales | St David's Hall | Waysted |
| 2 October 1984 | Birmingham | England | Birmingham Odeon | Waysted |
| 3 October 1984 | Birmingham | England | Birmingham Odeon | Waysted |
| 5 October 1984 | Southampton | England | Gaumont Theater | Waysted |
| 7 October 1984 | Cardiff | Wales | St David's Hall | Waysted |
| 8 October 1984 | London | England | Hammersmith Odeon | Waysted |
| 9 October 1984 | London | England | Hammersmith Odeon | Waysted |
| 10 October 1984 | London | England | Hammersmith Odeon | Waysted |
| 12 October 1984 | London | England | Hammersmith Odeon | Waysted |
| 13 October 1984 | London | England | Hammersmith Odeon | Waysted |
| 15 October 1984 | Cologne | West Germany | Sporthalle | Mötley Crüe |
| 16 October 1984 | Böblingen | West Germany | Sporthalle | Mötley Crüe |
| 17 October 1984 | Heidelberg | West Germany | Rhein-Neckar-Halle | Mötley Crüe |
| 19 October 1984 | Würzburg | West Germany | Carl-Diem-Halle | Mötley Crüe |
| 20 October 1984 | Brussels | Belgium | Forest National | Mötley Crüe |
| 21 October 1984 | Nancy | France | Parc des Expositions | Mötley Crüe |
| 23 October 1984 | Freiburg im Breisgau | West Germany | Stadthalle Freiburg | Mötley Crüe |
| 24 October 1984 | Munich | West Germany | Olympiahalle | Mötley Crüe |
| 26 October 1984 | Essen | West Germany | Grugahalle | Mötley Crüe |
| 27 October 1984 | Bremen | West Germany | Stadthalle Bremen | Mötley Crüe |
| 28 October 1984 | Zwolle | Netherlands | IJsselhallen | Mötley Crüe |
| 29 October 1984 | Paris | France | Espace Balard | Mötley Crüe; Mama's Boys |
| 1 November 1984 | Copenhagen | Denmark | Brøndbyhallen | Mötley Crüe |
| 2 November 1984 | Stockholm | Sweden | Johanneshovs Isstadion | Mötley Crüe |
| 3 November 1984 | Gothenburg | Sweden | Scandinavium | Mötley Crüe |
| 5 November 1984 | Helsinki | Finland | Helsinki Ice Hall | Mötley Crüe |
| 8 November 1984 | Rüsselsheim | West Germany | Walter-Köbel-Halle | Mötley Crüe |
| 9 November 1984 | Neunkirchen am Brand | West Germany | Hemmerleinhalle | Mötley Crüe |
| 11 November 1984 | Bologna | Italy | Teatro Tenda | Mötley Crüe |
| 12 November 1984 | Milan | Italy | Teatro Tenda di Lampugnano | Mötley Crüe |
| 13 November 1984 | Lyon | France | Halle Tony Garnier | Mötley Crüe |
| 14 November 1984 | Basel | Switzerland | St. Jakob Sporthalle | Mötley Crüe |
| 24 November 1984 | Halifax | Canada | Halifax Metro Centre | Twisted Sister |
| 26 November 1984 | Quebec City | Canada | Colisée de Québec | Twisted Sister |
| 27 November 1984 | Montreal | Canada | Montreal Forum | Twisted Sister |
| 28 November 1984 | Ottawa | Canada | Ottawa Civic Centre | Twisted Sister |
| 30 November 1984 | Toronto | Canada | Maple Leaf Gardens | Twisted Sister |
| 1 December 1984 | Greater Sudbury | Canada | Sudbury Community Arena | Twisted Sister |
| 3 December 1984 | Winnipeg | Canada | Winnipeg Arena | Twisted Sister |
| 4 December 1984 | Regina | Canada | Agridome | Twisted Sister |
| 6 December 1984 | Edmonton | Canada | Northlands Coliseum | Twisted Sister |
| 7 December 1984 | Calgary | Canada | Stampede Corral | Twisted Sister |
| 9 December 1984 | Vancouver | Canada | Pacific Coliseum | Twisted Sister |
| 10 December 1984 | Seattle | United States | Seattle Center Coliseum | Twisted Sister |
| 11 December 1984 | Portland | United States | Portland Memorial Coliseum | Twisted Sister |
| 13 December 1984 | Salt Lake City | United States | Salt Palace | Twisted Sister |
| 15 December 1984 | Denver | United States | McNichols Sports Arena | —N/a |
| 17 December 1984 | Kansas City | United States | Kemper Arena | Twisted Sister |
| 18 December 1984 | St. Louis | United States | Kiel Auditorium | Twisted Sister |
| 19 December 1984 | Milwaukee | United States | MECCA Arena | Twisted Sister |
| 20 December 1984 | Bloomington | United States | Met Center | Twisted Sister |
| 21 December 1984 | Rosemont | United States | Rosemont Horizon | Twisted Sister |

List of 1985 concerts
| Date | City | Country | Venue | Opening Act |
|---|---|---|---|---|
| 3 January 1985 | Cincinnati | United States | Cincinnati Gardens | Twisted Sister |
| 4 January 1985 | Detroit | United States | Joe Louis Arena | Twisted Sister |
| 5 January 1985 | Columbus | United States | Battelle Hall | Twisted Sister |
| 6 January 1985 | Richfield | United States | Richfield Coliseum | Twisted Sister |
| 7 January 1985 | Buffalo | United States | Buffalo Memorial Auditorium | Twisted Sister |
| 11 January 1985^{[A]} | Rio de Janeiro | Brazil | City of Rock | Queen (headliner); Whitesnake |
| 14 January 1985 | Hartford | United States | Hartford Civic Center | Twisted Sister |
| 15 January 1985 | Worcester | United States | Worcester Centrum | Twisted Sister |
| 17 January 1985 | New York City | United States | Radio City Music Hall | Queensrÿche |
| 18 January 1985 | New York City | United States | Radio City Music Hall | Queensrÿche |
| 19 January 1985 | New York City | United States | Radio City Music Hall | Queensrÿche |
| 20 January 1985 | New York City | United States | Radio City Music Hall | Queensrÿche |
| 21 January 1985 | New York City | United States | Radio City Music Hall | Queensrÿche |
| 28 January 1985 | Landover | United States | Capital Centre | Twisted Sister |
| 29 January 1985 | Philadelphia | United States | The Spectrum | Twisted Sister |
| 31 January 1985 | Columbia | United States | Carolina Coliseum | Twisted Sister |
| 1 February 1985 | Johnson City | United States | Freedom Hall Civic Center | Twisted Sister |
| 2 February 1985 | Atlanta | United States | Omni Coliseum | Twisted Sister |
| 3 February 1985 | Memphis | United States | Mid-South Coliseum | Twisted Sister |
| 5 February 1985 | Nashville | United States | Nashville Municipal Auditorium | Twisted Sister |
| 6 February 1985 | Knoxville | United States | Knoxville Civic Coliseum | Twisted Sister |
| 8 February 1985 | Charlotte | United States | Charlotte Coliseum | Twisted Sister |
| 9 February 1985 | Greensboro | United States | Greensboro Coliseum | Twisted Sister |
| 10 February 1985 | Greenville | United States | Greenville Memorial Auditorium | Twisted Sister |
| 12 February 1985 | Jacksonville | United States | Jacksonville Memorial Coliseum | Twisted Sister |
| 14 February 1985 | North Fort Myers | United States | Lee County Civic Center | Twisted Sister |
| 15 February 1985 | Pembroke Pines | United States | Hollywood Sportatorium | Twisted Sister |
| 16 February 1985 | Lakeland | United States | Lakeland Civic Center | Twisted Sister |
| 17 February 1985 | St. Petersburg | United States | Bayfront Center | Twisted Sister |
| 19 February 1985 | Chattanooga | United States | UTC Arena | Twisted Sister |
| 20 February 1985 | Birmingham | United States | Boutwell Memorial Auditorium | —N/a |
| 21 February 1985 | Huntsville | United States | Von Braun Civic Center | —N/a |
| 23 February 1985 | Beaumont | United States | Beaumont Civic Center | W.A.S.P. |
| 24 February 1985 | Biloxi | United States | Mississippi Coast Coliseum | W.A.S.P. |
| 27 February 1985 | New Orleans | United States | Lakefront Arena | W.A.S.P. |
| 28 February 1985 | Houston | United States | The Summit | W.A.S.P. |
| 1 March 1985 | Waco | United States | Waco Convention Center | W.A.S.P. |
| 2 March 1985 | Oklahoma City | United States | Myriad Convention Center | W.A.S.P. |
| 4 March 1985 | Dallas | United States | Reunion Arena | W.A.S.P. |
| 5 March 1985 | San Antonio | United States | San Antonio Convention Center | W.A.S.P. |
| 7 March 1985 | Lubbock | United States | City Bank Coliseum | W.A.S.P. |
| 8 March 1985 | El Paso | United States | El Paso County Coliseum | W.A.S.P. |
| 9 March 1985 | Albuquerque | United States | Tingley Coliseum | W.A.S.P. |
| 10 March 1985 | Tucson | United States | Tucson Convention Center | W.A.S.P. |
| 14 March 1985 | Long Beach | United States | Long Beach Arena | Twisted Sister |
| 15 March 1985 | Long Beach | United States | Long Beach Arena | Twisted Sister |
| 16 March 1985 | Long Beach | United States | Long Beach Arena | Twisted Sister |
| 17 March 1985 | Long Beach | United States | Long Beach Arena | Twisted Sister |
| 19 March 1985 | Reno | United States | Lawlor Events Center | Twisted Sister |
| 20 March 1985 | Fresno | United States | Selland Arena | Twisted Sister |
| 21 March 1985 | Daly City | United States | Cow Palace | Twisted Sister |
| 23 March 1985 | San Diego | United States | San Diego Sports Arena | Twisted Sister |
| 24 March 1985 | Tempe | United States | Compton Terrace | Twisted Sister |
| 25 March 1985 | Las Vegas | United States | Aladdin Theater | Warrior |
| 26 March 1985 | San Bernardino | United States | Orange Pavilion | Warrior |
| 31 March 1985 | Honolulu | United States | Neal S. Blaisdell Center | Warrior |
| 14 April 1985 | Tokyo | Japan | Nakano Sun Plaza | —N/a |
| 15 April 1985 | Tokyo | Japan | Nakano Sun Plaza | —N/a |
| 17 April 1985 | Tokyo | Japan | Tokyo Kōsei Nenkin Kaikan | —N/a |
| 19 April 1985 | Tokyo | Japan | Tokyo Kōsei Nenkin Kaikan | —N/a |
| 20 April 1985 | Nagoya | Japan | Nagoya Civic Assembly Hall | —N/a |
| 22 April 1985 | Fukuoka | Japan | Fukuoka Sunpalace | —N/a |
| 24 April 1985 | Osaka | Japan | Festival Hall | —N/a |
| 25 April 1985 | Tokyo | Japan | Nakano Sun Plaza | —N/a |
| 2 May 1985 | Canberra | Australia | Canberra Civic Theatre | Boss |
| 3 May 1985 | Melbourne | Australia | Festival Hall | Boss |
| 4 May 1985 | Adelaide | Australia | Thebarton Theatre | Boss |
| 6 May 1985 | Wollongong | Australia | Shellharbour Workers Club | Boss |
| 7 May 1985 | Sydney | Australia | Hordern Pavilion | Boss |
| 8 May 1985 | Newcastle | Australia | Newcastle Civic Theatre | Boss |
| 10 May 1985 | Brisbane | Australia | Brisbane Festival Hall | Boss |
| 23 May 1985 | Portland | United States | Cumberland County Civic Center | Accept |
| 24 May 1985 | Uniondale | United States | Nassau Veterans Memorial Coliseum | Accept |
| 25 May 1985 | Binghamton | United States | Broome County Veterans Memorial Arena | Accept |
| 27 May 1985 | Rochester | United States | Rochester Community War Memorial | Accept |
| 28 May 1985 | Glens Falls | United States | Glens Falls Civic Center | Accept |
| 29 May 1985 | Springfield | United States | Springfield Civic Center | Accept |
| 31 May 1985 | New Haven | United States | New Haven Coliseum | Accept |
| 1 June 1985 | Allentown | United States | Great Allentown Fair | Accept |
| 2 June 1985 | Providence | United States | Providence Civic Center | Accept |
| 4 June 1985 | Columbia | United States | Merriweather Post Pavilion | Accept |
| 5 June 1985 | Pittsburgh | United States | Pittsburgh Civic Arena | Accept |
| 7 June 1985 | Trotwood | United States | Hara Arena | Accept |
| 8 June 1985 | Evansville | United States | Mesker Amphitheatre | Accept; Why on Earth |
| 9 June 1985 | East Troy | United States | Alpine Valley Music Theatre | Accept |
| 11 June 1985 | Toledo | United States | Toledo Sports Arena | Accept |
| 12 June 1985 | Clarkston | United States | Pine Knob Music Theatre | Accept |
| 14 June 1985 | Saginaw | United States | Wendler Arena | Accept |
| 15 June 1985 | Charlevoix | United States | Castle Farms | Accept |
| 16 June 1985 | Hoffman Estates | United States | Poplar Creek Music Theater | Accept |
| 18 June 1985 | Peoria | United States | Peoria Civic Center | Accept |
| 19 June 1985 | Cedar Rapids | United States | Five Seasons Center | Accept |
| 21 June 1985 | Madison | United States | Dane County Coliseum | Accept |
| 22 June 1985 | Seymour | United States | Outagamie County Fairgrounds | Accept; Ratt |
| 23 June 1985 | Minneapolis | United States | Trout Aire Amphitheatre | Accept; Ratt |
| 24 June 1985 | Fargo | United States | Red River Fairgrounds | Accept; Ratt |
| 26 June 1985 | Des Moines | United States | Iowa Veterans Memorial Auditorium | Accept |
| 27 June 1985 | Omaha | United States | Omaha Civic Auditorium | Accept |
| 29 June 1985 | Morrison | United States | Red Rocks Amphitheatre | Accept |
| 3 July 1985 | San Jose | United States | San Jose Civic Auditorium | Accept; W.A.S.P. |
| 4 July 1985 | Sacramento | United States | Cal Expo Amphitheatre | Accept; W.A.S.P. |
| 5 July 1985 | Irvine | United States | Irvine Meadows Amphitheatre | Accept; W.A.S.P. |

Festivals and other miscellaneous performances
^{A} This concert was a part of "Rock in Rio"

Cancellations

- 21 August 1984: Pordenone, Italy, Parco Galvani
- 23 January 1985: New York City, United States, Radio City Music Hall; cancelled due to health problems.
- 24 January 1985: New York City, United States, Radio City Music Hall; cancelled due to health problems.
- 25 January 1985: Glens Falls, United States, Civic Center; cancelled due to health problems.
- 26 January 1985: Bethlehem, United States, Stabler Arena; cancelled due to health problems.
- British writer Neil Daniels states that some proposed South African dates were cancelled when objections arose to the use of the word "slavery".
