= Diary of a Madman Tour =

1981–1982 concert tour by Ozzy Osbourne

- Promotional tour by Ozzy Osbourne
- Poster to the concert in Indianapolis, USA
- Location: Europe; North America; Asia
- Associated album: Diary of a Madman
- Start date: 5 November 1981
- End date: 8 August 1982
- Legs: 1 in Europe; 2 in North America; 1 in Asia; 4 total
- No. of shows: 123

Ozzy Osbourne concert chronology
- Blizzard of Ozz Tour (1980–1981); Diary of a Madman Tour (1981–1982); Speak of the Devil Tour (1982–1983)

The Diary of a Madman Tour was the second concert tour by the English heavy metal singer Ozzy Osbourne. It was undertaken in support of Osbourne's second album Diary of a Madman and covered Europe, North America, and Asia. This was guitarist Randy Rhoads’ last tour as he died in a plane crash at a small airport in Leesburg, Florida, on 19 March 1982, during the North American leg of the tour. The band took a two-week break after his death. Ozzy and Sharon Osbourne restarted the tour with ex-Gillan guitarist Bernie Tormé, who only performed seven shows before being replaced by future Night Ranger guitarist, Brad Gillis.

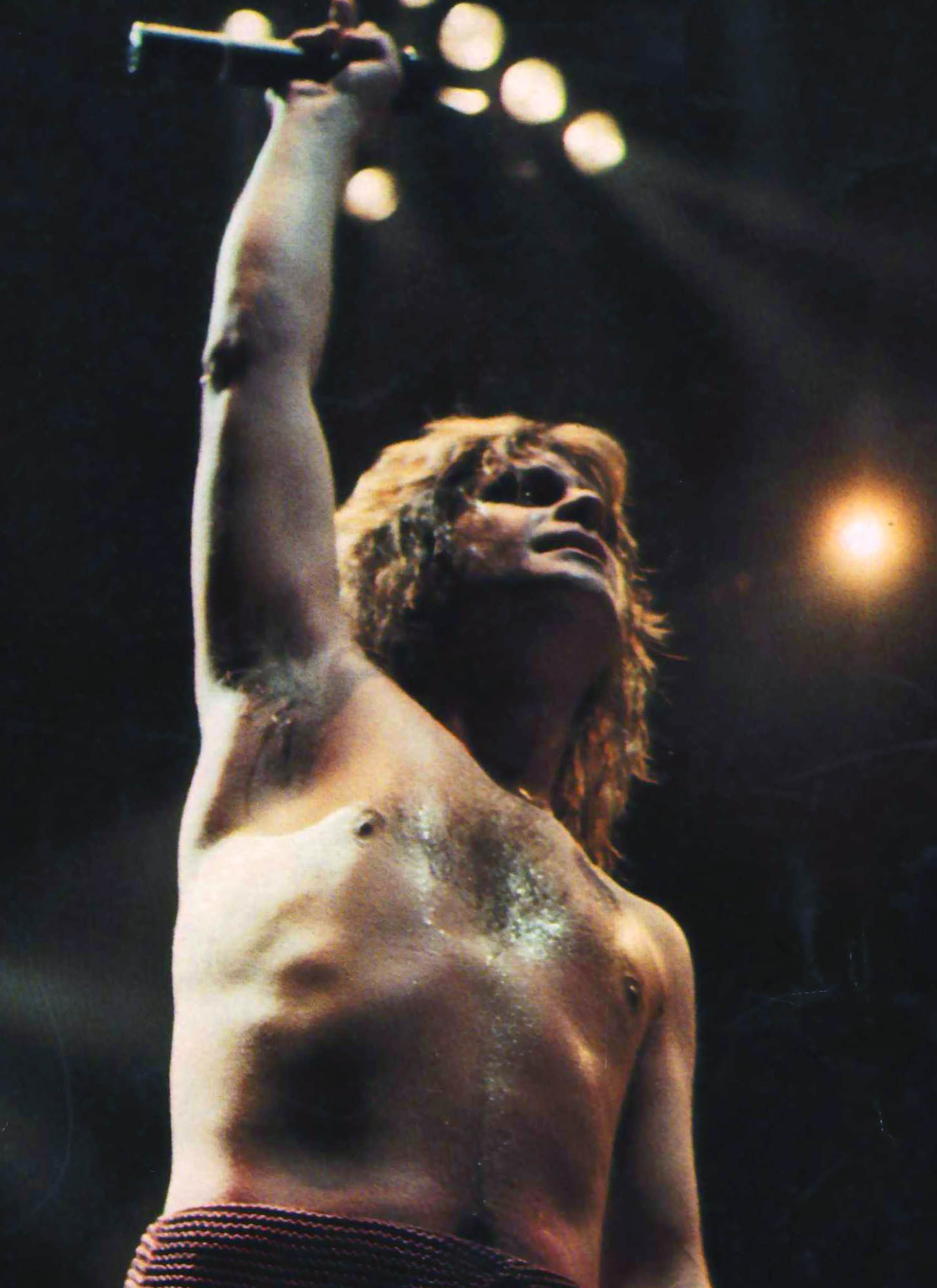
Osbourne onstage during the Diary of a Madman Tour, 1982

== Overview ==
=== Background ===
After the Blizzard of Ozz Tour, the band took a one-month break before going to Europe to start the tour supporting the upcoming album, Diary of a Madman, scheduled for worldwide release on 7 November 1981. Osbourne, Rhoads, Rudy Sarzo, Tommy Aldridge, and Lindsay Bridgwater reconvened at Shepperton Studios in England, where they would spend the next two weeks rehearsing.

=== European leg (5 November – 2 December 1981) ===
On 4 November 1981, the band arrived in Hamburg, West Germany, to start the tour, opening up for Saxon in Europe. The band's first show was at Ernst-Merck-Halle in front of a sold-out crowd. On 7 November, Diary of a Madman was released worldwide and "Flying High Again", "Over the Mountain", "You Can't Kill Rock and Roll" and "Diary of a Madman" were released as singles. On 13 November, after the band's performance at Upper Swabia Hall in Ravensburg, Sharon called off the rest of the European leg because of Osbourne's mental health issues resulting from his marriage to Thelma Osbourne having fallen apart. Sharon took Osbourne back to England and checked him into a mental health clinic while the rest of the band went on excursions through West Germany and France before returning to England.

On 22 November, the rest of the band reconvened at Shepperton Studios to begin pre-production rehearsals for the United Kingdom dates while Osbourne was in hospital. The band rehearsed songs from Blizzard of Ozz, and the three Black Sabbath songs they had already been performing, "Over the Mountain," "Flying High Again" and "Believer" from Diary of a Madman. On 29 November, with opening act Girl, the band performed at Colston Hall in Bristol. On 2 December, the band performed its last show of the leg at the Royal Court Theatre in Liverpool. The rest of the European leg was canceled because of Osbourne's depression.

=== North American leg (30 December 1981 – 19 March 1982) ===
After returning to Los Angeles on 5 December, the band took a break for a couple of weeks and then began pre-production rehearsals. Lindsay Bridgwater departed at this time and Don Airey, former keyboardist of Rainbow was hired. In December, Entertainment Tonight taped some video footage of the band's rehearsals for a segment on the new show. On 30 December, the band performed at the Cow Palace in Daly City, California. Rhoads received the Best New Talent Award from Guitar Player. The band returned to Los Angeles for their last show at the Los Angeles Memorial Sports Arena. English hard rock and heavy metal band UFO and Starfighters were added to the bill as the opening bands. On 7 January, the band played at Tingley Coliseum in Albuquerque. The local news filmed the first part of the show where the band performed "Over the Mountain" and "Mr. Crowley".

On 20 January, at the Des Moines Veterans Memorial Auditorium a fan threw a dead bat, (stolen from the science department of Lincoln, a local high school), onto the stage. Osbourne, believing it to be a toy, took the bat, held out its wings and bit it on a wing then threw it back into the audience. This resulted in him being checked into Des Moines General Hospital to receive rabies shots after the show. On 24 January at Rosemont Horizon in Rosemont, Illinois, Osbourne lifted Rhoads up by his right leg during "Mr. Crowley". A professional photographer captured the moment and the image was used as the cover art for the live album, Tribute. As the band played "Over the Mountain" at the Assembly Hall on their 26 January show in Champaign, Illinois, Osbourne collapsed after singing the first line of the song, and was pulled off stage by Sharon Osbourne and the rest of stage crew, while the band finished instrumentally. He was rushed to the hospital and the remainder of the show was cancelled. Osbourne was given two days to rest and heal from his illness caused by the rabies shots. The band went on to Chicago.

Before the band's performance at Civic Arena on 2 February, Rhoads did a guitar seminar at the Music City Record Store in Greensburg, Pennsylvania. On 11 February, after playing at the Market Square Arena in Indianapolis, tensions between Osbourne and Rhoads grew as Rhoads did not want to play on a live record consisting of Black Sabbath songs as he felt it would be a major step backward in his career. The record company forced Ozzy and Sharon to release the album. The band performed at Fair Park Coliseum in Beaumont, Texas on 16 February, where the soundcheck rehearsal that took place earlier that day was captured on video.

On 19 February, Sharon hid all of Ozzy's clothes so that he could not go out and drink anymore. Ozzy put on Sharon's nightgown, got drunk, urinated on The Alamo and was arrested. He was released hours before the show after Sharon warned the police that the concert promoters were worried that not releasing Osbourne from jail would result in the cancellation of that evening's performance and possibly incite a riot. After Osbourne was released, the band performed at the San Antonio Convention Center Arena. Osbourne became "Public Enemy #1" in Texas and received death threats from parents, religious groups and political activists.

On 20 February, before that evening's performance at Reunion Arena, Rhoads agreed to play on the live album, one more studio album, and to tour with Osbourne. He would then leave to study classical guitar at the University of California, Los Angeles. The band performed in front of a sold-out crowd at Knoxville Civic Coliseum on 18 March.

The band were on the tour bus, which was supposed to be heading to Orlando, Florida, for the Rock Super Bowl at the Tangerine Bowl on 20 March, but a mechanical problem forced it into a depot called Flying Baron Estates, outside Leesburg, Florida for repairs. Ozzy and Sharon Osbourne (then Sharon Arden), Rudy Sarzo, and Tommy Aldridge were all asleep on the bus while Randy Rhoads, Don Airey, tour manager Jake Duncan, the band's wardrobe/makeup artist Rachel Youngblood, bus driver Andrew Aycock and his wife Wanda, and the rest of the crew were awake. On the property, there was an airstrip and a hangar full of small airplanes. Aycock, who claimed to be an experienced pilot, took a Beechcraft Bonanza F35 plane out of the hangar and offered to take people up in the air. During one of the flights with Aycock, Rhoads, and Youngblood, the left wing struck the bus causing the plane to crash, instantly killing all three. Once the investigation was over on 21 March, the band returned to Los Angeles, where they spent the next two weeks trying to recuperate from the tragedy while attempting to find another guitarist.

=== North America and Japan (1 April – 8 August 1982) ===
The band, and especially Osbourne, was in a severe state of depression. Ozzy's drug and alcohol addiction and mental state had worsened. On the day of Rhoads's death, Osbourne had said that it was over and that he never wanted to play again. Sharon got Ozzy back on his feet to finish the tour for his fans. Osbourne had said: "You Can't Kill Rock 'N' Roll," when he was interviewed on Late Night with David Letterman a week after Rhoads's death. Rudy Sarzo called his younger brother, future-Hurricane lead-guitarist, Robert and asked him to audition and play the material the same way as Randy; he was hired. Another guitarist showed up to audition, former-Gillan guitarist, Bernie Tormé. He had been hired and given an advance by Sharon's father, Don Arden, and even though his audition did not go smoothly because he was unfamiliar with the material, and his playing style and feel was different from Rhoads, Tormé ended up getting the job instead of Sarzo.

On 28 March, the band flew to Bethlehem, Pennsylvania, for three days of rehearsals to restart the tour. On 1 April, the band restarted the tour at Stabler Arena in Bethlehem. UFO was back as an opening act in Bethlehem, and Magnum was added during the following five-show stint at Philadelphia's Spectrum. After the Philadelphia shows with Tormé, who was eager to start his solo career, Sharon found future-Night Ranger guitarist, Brad Gillis. He did not feel ready to play onstage yet as he needed some time to learn the setlist. Tormé did several more shows with the band until Gillis was ready. On 13 April, he played with the band for the first time at Broome County Veterans Memorial Arena in Binghamton, New York. The band finished the tour with Gillis and Tormé left to start his solo career.

After the band's performance at Glens Falls Civic Arena in New York on 10 May, Sharon put the tour on hold again as Osbourne's depression, mental illness, and drug and alcohol addiction had grown worse. The rest of the tour's shows were postponed. The band restarted the tour on 19 May at Cape Cod Coliseum in South Yarmouth, Massachusetts with Magnum as the opening band for the East Coast and Midwest shows, and the Canadian band, Santers, opening for the Canadian dates. Axe was the opening band for the West Coast shows. On 19 June, the band performed its first laser show at Oakland Arena in California. The band performed at Irvine Meadows on 25 June, where the live pro-video footage was used for Speak of the Devil Live, which was broadcast on MTV on Halloween.

On 4 July, Ozzy and Sharon got married. From 9 to 15 July, the band performed several shows in Japan. Later on 6 August, the day before the band's show at the Rock N Roll Super Bowl (1982) at The Cotton Bowl in Dallas where Le Roux was opening and the supporting acts were Loverboy and Foreigner, Osbourne's depression had grown even worse, and not wanting to do more shows, he shaved his head completely. This did not stop Sharon from forcing him to get on stage wearing a wig. Osbourne ripped the wig off his head and threw it into the audience.

== Personnel ==
European line-up

- Ozzy Osbourne — vocals
- Randy Rhoads — guitar
- Rudy Sarzo — bass
- Tommy Aldridge — drums
- Lindsay Bridgewater — keyboards

North America line-up

- Ozzy Osbourne — vocals
- Randy Rhoads — guitar
- Rudy Sarzo — bass
- Tommy Aldridge — drums
- Don Airey — keyboards

North America line-up

- Ozzy Osbourne — vocals
- Bernie Tormé — guitar
- Rudy Sarzo — bass
- Tommy Aldridge — drums
- Don Airey — keyboards

Speak of the Devil line-up

- Ozzy Osbourne — vocals
- Brad Gillis — guitar
- Rudy Sarzo — bass
- Tommy Aldridge — drums
- Don Airey — keyboards

== Setlists ==
Europe setlist

"Diary of a Madman" (Intro/Outro) [Audio introduction]

1. "Over the Mountain"
2. "Flying High Again"
3. "Believer"
4. "Crazy Train"
5. "Mr. Crowley"
6. "I Don't Know"
7. "Revelation Mother Earth"
8. "Suicide Solution"
9. Randy Rhoads guitar solo and "The Man on the Flying Trapeze" (Instrumental band jam)
10. Tommy Aldridge drum solo and "The Man on the Flying Trapeze" (Instrumental band jam) [Reprise]
11. "Paranoid" (Black Sabbath cover)
12. "Steal Away the Night" [Encore]

Main setlist

"Diary of a Madman" (Intro/Outro) [Audio Introduction]

1. "Over the Mountain"
2. "Mr. Crowley"
3. "Crazy Train"
4. "Revelation Mother Earth"
5. "Steal Away the Night"
6. "Suicide Solution"
7. Randy Rhoads/Bernie Tormé/Brad Gillis Guitar Solo and "The Man on the Flying Trapeze" (Instrumental band jam)
8. Tommy Aldridge drum solo and "The Man on the Flying Trapeze" (Instrumental band jam) [Reprise]
9. "Goodbye to Romance"
10. "I Don't Know"
11. "No Bone Movies"
12. "Believer"
13. "Flying High Again"
14. "Iron Man" (Black Sabbath Song)
15. "Children of the Grave" (Black Sabbath Song)
16. "Paranoid" (Black Sabbath Song) [Encore]

== Tour dates ==
Date	City	Country	Venue
Europe
~~30 October 1981~~	~~Brussels~~	~~Belgium~~	~~Forest National~~
~~31 October 1981~~	~~Amsterdam~~	~~Netherlands~~	~~Jaap Edenhal~~
1 November 1981	Essen	West Germany	Grugahalle
~~2 November 1981~~	~~Bremen~~	West Germany	~~Stadthalle~~
~~3 November 1981~~	~~Kiel~~	West Germany	~~Ostseehalle~~
~~4 November 1981~~	~~Hanover~~	West Germany	~~Eilenriedehalle~~
5 November 1981	Hamburg	West Germany	Ernst-Merck-Halle
6 November 1981	Wolfsburg	West Germany	Wolfsburg City Hall
8 November 1981	Cologne	West Germany	Sporthalle
9 November 1981	Offenbach	West Germany	Stadthalle Offenbach
10 November 1981	Saarbrücken	West Germany	Saarlandhalle
11 November 1981	Karlsruhe	West Germany	Schwarzwaldhalle
12 November 1981	Ravensburg	West Germany	Upper Swabia Hall
~~13 November 1981~~	~~Böblingen~~	West Germany	~~Sporthalle~~
~~14 November 1981~~	~~Neunkirchen~~	West Germany	~~Hemmerleinhalle~~
~~16 November 1981~~	~~Munich~~	West Germany	~~Rudi-Sedlmayer-Halle~~
~~17 November 1981~~	~~Eppelheim~~	West Germany	~~Rhein-Neckar-Halle~~
~~19 November 1981~~	~~Dortmund~~	West Germany	~~Westfalenhallen~~
~~20 November 1981~~	~~Kuernach~~	West Germany	~~Kuernach Hall~~
~~22 November 1981~~	~~Strasbourg~~	~~France~~	~~Rhenus Hall~~
~~23 November 1981~~	~~Reims~~	~~France~~	~~Reims Sports Palace~~
~~24 November 1981~~	~~Paris~~	~~France~~	~~Hippodrome de Pantin~~
~~25 November 1981~~	~~Lille~~	~~France~~	~~St. Sauveur Sports Palace~~
~~27 November 1981~~	~~Geneva~~	~~Switzerland~~	~~Champel Sports Pavilion~~
29 November 1981	Bristol	England	Colston Hall
30 November 1981	Cardiff	Wales	Sophia Gardens Pavilion
~~1 December 1981~~	~~Leicester~~	England	~~De Montfort Hall~~
2 December 1981	Liverpool	England	Royal Court Theatre
~~4 December 1981~~	~~Edinburgh~~	~~Scotland~~	~~Edinburgh Playhouse~~
~~5 December 1981~~	~~Glasgow~~	~~Scotland~~	~~The Apollo~~
~~6 December 1981~~	~~Newcastle~~	~~England~~	~~Newcastle City Hall~~
~~7 December 1981~~	~~Newcastle~~	~~England~~	~~Newcastle City Hall~~
~~18 December 1981~~	~~Manchester~~	~~England~~	~~Apollo~~
~~19 December 1981~~	~~Leeds~~	~~England~~	~~Queens Hall~~
~~22 December 1981~~	~~Stafford~~	~~England~~	~~New Bingley Hall~~
~~23 December 1981~~	~~Leicester~~	~~England~~	~~De Montfort Hall~~
~~24 December 1981~~	~~London~~	~~England~~	~~Hammersmith Odeon~~
~~26 December 1981~~	~~London~~	~~England~~	~~Hammersmith Odeon~~
North America
30 December 1981	Daly City	United States	Cow Palace
31 December 1981	Los Angeles	United States	Los Angeles Memorial Sports Arena
1 January 1982	Phoenix	United States	Arizona Veterans Memorial Coliseum
3 January 1982	Fresno	United States	Selland Arena
4 January 1982	San Diego	United States	San Diego Sports Arena
6 January 1982	Tucson	United States	Tucson Community Center
7 January 1982	Albuquerque	United States	Tingley Coliseum
9 January 1982	Salt Lake City	United States	Salt Palace
10 January 1982	Boulder	United States	CU Events Center
12 January 1982	Omaha	United States	Omaha Civic Auditorium
13 January 1982	Kansas City	United States	Kansas City Municipal Auditorium
15 January 1982	Bloomington	United States	Metropolitan Sports Center
17 January 1982	Duluth	United States	Duluth Arena
19 January 1982	La Crosse	United States	La Crosse Center
20 January 1982	Des Moines	United States	Iowa Veterans Memorial Auditorium
22 January 1982	Milwaukee	United States	MECCA Arena
23 January 1982	Madison	United States	Dane County Expo Coliseum
24 January 1982	Rosemont	United States	Rosemont Horizon
26 January 1982	Champaign	United States	Assembly Hall
~~27 January 1982~~	~~St. Louis~~	United States	~~Kiel Auditorium~~
29 January 1982	Terre Haute	United States	Hulman Center
30 January 1982	Toledo	United States	Toledo Sports Arena
31 January 1982	Richfield	United States	Richfield Coliseum
2 February 1982	Pittsburgh	United States	Pittsburgh Civic Arena
3 February 1982	Charleston	United States	Charleston Civic Center
5 February 1982	Lansing	United States	Lansing Civic Center
6 February 1982	St. Louis	United States	Kiel Auditorium
8 February 1982	Detroit	United States	Cobo Arena
9 February 1982	Kalamazoo	United States	Wings Stadium
11 February 1982	Indianapolis	United States	Market Square Arena
12 February 1982	Cincinnati	United States	Riverfront Coliseum
13 February 1982	Lexington	United States	Rupp Arena
15 February 1982	Beaumont	United States	Fair Park Coliseum
17 February 1982	Houston	United States	Sam Houston Coliseum
19 February 1982	San Antonio	United States	HemisFair Arena
20 February 1982	Dallas	United States	Reunion Arena
21 February 1982	Corpus Christi	United States	Corpus Christi Memorial Coliseum
23 February 1982	El Paso	United States	El Paso County Coliseum
24 February 1982	Lubbock	United States	Lubbock Municipal Coliseum
25 February 1982	Norman	United States	Lloyd Noble Center
27 February 1982	Valley Center	United States	Britt Brown Arena
28 February 1982	Amarillo	United States	Amarillo Civic Center
2 March 1982	Shreveport	United States	Hirsch Memorial Coliseum
~~3 March 1982~~	~~Baton Rouge~~	United States	~~Riverside Centroplex~~
5 March 1982	Pine Bluff	United States	Pine Bluff Convention Center
6 March 1982	Birmingham	United States	Boutwell Memorial Auditorium
17 March 1982	Atlanta	United States	The Omni Coliseum
18 March 1982	Knoxville	United States	Knoxville Civic Coliseum
~~20 March 1982~~	~~Orlando~~	United States	~~The Tangerine Bowl~~
~~21 March 1982~~	~~Miami~~	United States	~~Miami Orange Bowl~~
~~24 March 1982~~	~~Landover~~	United States	~~Capital Centre~~
~~25 March 1982~~	~~Binghamton~~	United States	~~Broome County Veterans Memorial Arena~~
~~26 March 1982~~	~~Philadelphia~~	United States	~~Spectrum~~
~~28 March 1982~~	~~Hempstead~~	United States	~~Nassau Coliseum~~
~~29 March 1982~~	~~East Rutherford~~	United States	~~Meadowlands Arena~~
~~30 March 1982~~	~~Hartford~~	United States	~~Hartford Civic Arena~~
North America
1 April 1982	Bethlehem	United States	Stabler Arena
2 April 1982	Boston	United States	Boston Garden
3 April 1982	New Haven	United States	New Haven Coliseum
5 April 1982	New York City	United States	Madison Square Garden
6 April 1982	Providence	United States	Providence Civic Center
9 April 1982	Buffalo	United States	Buffalo Memorial Auditorium
10 April 1982	Rochester	United States	Rochester Community War Memorial
13 April 1982	Binghamton	United States	Broome County Veterans Memorial Arena
15 April 1982	Fort Wayne	United States	Allen County War Memorial Coliseum
16 April 1982	Evansville	United States	Roberts Municipal Stadium
17 April 1982	Louisville	United States	Freedom Hall
19 April 1982	Erie	United States	Erie County Field House
20 April 1982	Hampton	United States	Hampton Coliseum
21 April 1982	Richmond	United States	Richmond Coliseum
23 April 1982	Johnson City	United States	Freedom Hall Civic Center
24 April 1982	Landover	United States	Capital Centre
25 April 1982	Baltimore	United States	Baltimore Civic Center
26 April 1982	Philadelphia	United States	The Spectrum
28 April 1982	Memphis	United States	Mid-South Coliseum
29 April 1982	Nashville	United States	Nashville Municipal Auditorium
30 April 1982	Greensboro	United States	Greensboro Coliseum
1 May 1982	Fayetteville	United States	Cumberland County Memorial Arena
3 May 1982	Uniondale	United States	Nassau Veterans Memorial Coliseum
4 May 1982	Wheeling	United States	Wheeling Civic Center
5 May 1982	Greenville	United States	Greenville Memorial Auditorium
6 May 1982	Charlotte	United States	Charlotte Coliseum
9 May 1982	Syracuse	United States	Onondaga County War Memorial
10 May 1982	Glens Falls	United States	Glens Falls Civic Center
19 May 1982	South Yarmouth	United States	Cape Cod Coliseum
21 May 1982	Hartford	United States	Hartford Civic Center
22 May 1982	Portland	United States	Cumberland County Civic Center
23 May 1982	East Rutherford	United States	Brendan Byrne Arena
25 May 1982	Columbus	United States	Columbus Fairgrounds Coliseum
26 May 1982	Trotwood	United States	Hara Arena
27 May 1982	Springfield	United States	Prairie Capital Convention Center
28 May 1982	Hoffman Estates	United States	Poplar Creek Music Theater
29 May 1982	East Troy	United States	Alpine Valley Music Theatre
30 May 1982	Charlevoix	United States	Castle Farms Music Theatre
31 May 1982	Ann Arbor	United States	Crisler Arena
2 June 1982	Ottawa	Canada	Ottawa Civic Centre
3 June 1982	Montreal	Canada	Montreal Forum
4 June 1982	Toronto	Canada	Maple Leaf Gardens
6 June 1982	Winnipeg	Canada	Winnipeg Arena
7 June 1982	Regina	Canada	Agridome
8 June 1982	Edmonton	Canada	Northlands Coliseum
9 June 1982	Calgary	Canada	Stampede Corral
10 June 1982	Vancouver	Canada	Pacific Coliseum
12 June 1982	Anchorage	United States	Anchorage High School Auditorium
15 June 1982	Seattle	United States	Seattle Center Coliseum
16 June 1982	Spokane	United States	Spokane Coliseum
17 June 1982	Portland	United States	Portland Memorial Coliseum
19 June 1982	Oakland	United States	Oakland-Alameda County Coliseum Arena
20 June 1982	Bakersfield	United States	Bakersfield Convention Center
22 June 1982	Reno	United States	Reno Centennial Coliseum
24 June 1982	San Diego	United States	San Diego Sports Arena
25 June 1982	Irvine	United States	Irvine Meadows Amphitheatre
28 June 1982	Honolulu	United States	Honolulu International Center
Asia
9 July 1982	Osaka	Japan	Festival Hall
11 July 1982	Nagoya	Japan	Nagoya Civic Assembly Hall
13 July 1982	Kyoto	Japan	Kyoto Kaikan
14 July 1982	Tokyo	Japan	Nakano Sun Plaza Hall
15 July 1982	Tokyo	Japan	Nakano Sun Plaza Hall
North America
1 August 1982	Inglewood	United States	The Forum
7 August 1982	Dallas	United States	Cotton Bowl
8 August 1982	New Orleans	United States	Tad Gormley Stadium
