= The Ultimate Sin Tour =

1986 concert tour by Ozzy Osbourne

- Tour by Ozzy Osbourne
- Poster to the concert in Fort Worth, Texas. A similar layout was used for other concert posters
- Associated album: The Ultimate Sin
- Start date: 6 February 1986
- End date: 12 October 1986
- Legs: 5
- No. of shows: 126

Ozzy Osbourne concert chronology
- Bark at the Moon Tour (1983–1985); The Ultimate Sin Tour (1986); No Rest for the Wicked Tour (1988–1989)

The Ultimate Sin Tour was a concert tour by English heavy metal singer Ozzy Osbourne in 1986, supporting his album The Ultimate Sin.

== Background ==
On 1 April 1986, a live performance promoting the album in Kansas City, Missouri, was filmed and released later that year as the home video The Ultimate Ozzy. In 1987, after the various tours in support of the album had concluded, guitarist Lee was unexpectedly fired by Osbourne's wife and manager Sharon. The specific justification for Lee's dismissal remains unknown. Bassist Soussan also departed, with Bob Daisley once again entering the fold.

Ratt, Metallica, Queensrÿche and Chrome Molly were opening acts for the tour.

In contrast to Osbourne's previous tour where he only played three songs from Bark at the Moon, the tour for The Ultimate Sin typically saw six new songs in the set.

== Set list ==
1. "O Fortuna" (Carl Orff song)
2. "Bark at the Moon"
3. "Suicide Solution"
4. "Never Know Why"
5. "Mr. Crowley"
6. "Shot in the Dark"
7. "I Don't Know"
8. "Killer of Giants"
9. "Thank God for the Bomb"
10. "The Ultimate Sin"
11. "Flying High Again"
12. "Secret Loser"
13. "Iron Man" (Black Sabbath cover)
14. "Crazy Train"
  Encore
15. "Paranoid" (Black Sabbath cover)

== Tour dates ==
Date	City	Country	Venue
6 February 1986	Belfast	Northern Ireland	Avoniel Leisure Centre
7 February 1986	Belfast	Northern Ireland	Avoniel Leisure Centre
9 February 1986	Dublin	Ireland	SFX Concert Hall
10 February 1986	Dublin	Ireland	SFX Concert Hall
12 February 1986	Newcastle	England	Newcastle City Hall
13 February 1986	Manchester	England	Manchester Apollo
14 February 1986	Manchester	England	Manchester Apollo
16 February 1986	Edinburgh	Scotland	Edinburgh Playhouse
17 February 1986	Sheffield	England	Sheffield City Hall
19 February 1986	London	England	Hammersmith Odeon
20 February 1986	London	England	Hammersmith Odeon
21 February 1986	London	England	Hammersmith Odeon
23 February 1986	Birmingham	England	Birmingham Odeon
24 February 1986	Birmingham	England	Birmingham Odeon
26 February 1986	London	England	Hammersmith Odeon
27 February 1986	Nottingham	England	Royal Concert Hall
28 February 1986	Newcastle	England	Mayfair Ballroom
2 March 1986	Ipswich	England	Ipswich Gaumont Theatre
3 March 1986	Leicester	England	De Montfort Hall
4 March 1986	Bradford	England	St George's Hall
27 March 1986	Valley Center	United States	Kansas Coliseum
29 March 1986	Oklahoma City	United States	Oklahoma State Fair Arena
1 April 1986	Kansas City	United States	Kemper Arena
2 April 1986	St. Louis	United States	Kiel Auditorium
4 April 1986	Detroit	United States	Joe Louis Arena
5 April 1986	Chicago	United States	UIC Pavilion
6 April 1986	Milwaukee	United States	MECCA Arena
8 April 1986	Indianapolis	United States	Market Square Arena
9 April 1986	Richfield	United States	Richfield Coliseum
10 April 1986	Erie	United States	Erie Civic Center
12 April 1986	Johnstown	United States	Cambria County War Memorial Arena
13 April 1986	Syracuse	United States	Onondaga County War Memorial Auditorium
14 April 1986	Rochester	United States	War Memorial Auditorium
16 April 1986	Landover	United States	Capital Centre
17 April 1986	Binghamton	United States	Broome County Veterans Memorial Arena
18 April 1986	Bethlehem	United States	Stabler Arena
20 April 1986	Philadelphia	United States	Spectrum
21 April 1986	East Rutherford	United States	Brendan Byrne Arena
23 April 1986	Providence	United States	Providence Civic Center
24 April 1986	New Haven	United States	New Haven Coliseum
25 April 1986	Worcester	United States	Centrum
27 April 1986	Glens Falls	United States	Glens Falls Civic Center
28 April 1986	Uniondale	United States	Nassau Coliseum
~~30 April 1986~~	~~Hampton~~	United States	~~Hampton Coliseum~~
1 May 1986	Richmond	United States	Richmond Coliseum
2 May 1986	Charlotte	United States	Charlotte Coliseum
3 May 1986	Johnson City	United States	Freedom Hall Civic Center
4 May 1986	Memphis	United States	Mid-South Coliseum
6 May 1986	New Orleans	United States	Lakefront Arena
8 May 1986	Austin	United States	Frank Erwin Center
9 May 1986	Houston	United States	The Summit
10 May 1986	Fort Worth	United States	Tarrant County Convention Center
12 May 1986	El Paso	United States	El Paso County Coliseum
13 May 1986	Albuquerque	United States	Tingley Coliseum
15 May 1986	Denver	United States	McNichols Sports Arena
17 May 1986	Salt Lake City	United States	Salt Palace
19 May 1986	Tucson	United States	Tucson Community Center
20 May 1986	Phoenix	United States	Arizona Veterans Memorial Coliseum
24 May 1986	Fukuoka	Japan	Fukuoka Sunpalace
26 May 1986	Osaka	Japan	Festival Hall
27 May 1986	Osaka	Japan	Osaka Kosei Nenkin Kaikan
29 May 1986	Nagoya	Japan	Nagoya Civic Assembly Hall
31 May 1986	Tokyo	Japan	NHK Hall
1 June 1986	Tokyo	Japan	NHK Hall
2 June 1986	Tokyo	Japan	Nippon Budokan
10 June 1986	San Diego	United States	San Diego Sports Arena
11 June 1986	Las Vegas	United States	Thomas & Mack Center
13 June 1986	Long Beach	United States	Long Beach Arena
14 June 1986	Long Beach	United States	Long Beach Arena
15 June 1986	Long Beach	United States	Long Beach Arena
~~16 June 1986~~	Daly City	United States	Cow Palace
17 June 1986	Daly City	United States	Cow Palace
~~18 June 1986~~	~~Sacramento~~	United States	~~Cal Expo Amphitheatre~~
~~20 June 1986~~	~~Central Point~~	United States	~~Jackson County Expo Pavilion~~
~~21 June 1986~~	~~Seattle~~	United States	~~Seattle Coliseum~~
~~22 June 1986~~	~~Seattle~~	United States	~~Seattle Coliseum~~
~~24 June 1986~~	~~Spokane~~	United States	~~Spokane Coliseum~~
~~25 June 1986~~	~~Portland~~	United States	~~Portland Veterans Memorial Coliseum~~
~~27 June 1986~~	~~Vancouver~~	~~Canada~~	~~Pacific Coliseum~~
~~29 June 1986~~	~~Calgary~~	~~Canada~~	~~Saddledome~~
~~30 June 1986~~	~~Edmonton~~	~~Canada~~	~~Northlands Coliseum~~
2 July 1986	Portland	United States	Portland Memorial Coliseum
3 July 1986	Spokane	United States	Spokane Coliseum
5 July 1986	Sacramento	United States	Cal Expo Amphitheatre
7 July 1986	Des Moines	United States	Des Moines Veterans Memorial Auditorium
8 July 1986	Omaha	United States	Omaha Civic Auditorium
9 July 1986	Bloomington	United States	Met Center
11 July 1986	Green Bay	United States	Brown County Veterans Memorial Arena
12 July 1986	East Troy	United States	Alpine Valley Music Theatre
13 July 1986	Hoffman Estates	United States	Poplar Creek Music Theater
15 July 1986	Peoria	United States	Peoria Civic Center
16 July 1986	Fort Wayne	United States	Allen County War Memorial Coliseum
17 July 1986	Columbus	United States	Ohio Center
19 July 1986	Battle Creek	United States	Kellogg Arena
20 July 1986	Saginaw	United States	Wendler Arena
21 July 1986	Clarkston	United States	Pine Knob Music Theatre
24 July 1986	Cincinnati	United States	Riverbend Music Center
25 July 1986	Louisville	United States	Cardinal Stadium
26 July 1986	Evansville	United States	Mesker Music Theater
27 July 1986	Nashville	United States	Nashville Municipal Auditorium
29 July 1986	Chattanooga	United States	UTC Arena
30 July 1986	Knoxville	United States	Knoxville Civic Coliseum
1 August 1986	Charleston	United States	Charleston Civic Coliseum
2 August 1986	Columbia	United States	Merriweather Post Pavilion
3 August 1986	Hampton	United States	Hampton Coliseum
16 August 1986	Castle Donington	England	Donington Park
23 August 1986	Stockholm	Sweden	Råsunda Stadium
30 August 1986	Nuremberg	West Germany	Zeppelin Field
31 August 1986	Mannheim	West Germany	Maimarktgelände
5 September 1986	Pembroke Pines	United States	Hollywood Sportatorium
6 September 1986	Orlando	United States	Orange County Civic Center
7 September 1986	St. Petersburg	United States	Bayfront Center
9 September 1986	Atlanta	United States	Omni Coliseum
10 September 1986	Jacksonville	United States	Jacksonville Coliseum
12 September 1986	Columbia	United States	Carolina Coliseum
13 September 1986	Greensboro	United States	Greensboro Coliseum
14 September 1986	Fayetteville	United States	Cumberland County Memorial Arena
16 September 1986	Providence	United States	Providence Civic Center
17 September 1986	Springfield	United States	Springfield Civic Center
18 September 1986	Philadelphia	United States	Spectrum
20 September 1986	Kingston	United States	Kingston Fairgrounds Grandstand
21 September 1986	Uniondale	United States	Nassau Coliseum
23 September 1986	Portland	United States	Cumberland County Civic Center
24 September 1986	Montreal	Canada	Montreal Forum
26 September 1986	Toronto	Canada	CNE Stadium
27 September 1986	Toledo	United States	Toledo Sports Arena
29 September 1986	Grand Rapids	United States	Welsh Auditorium
30 September 1986	Trotwood	United States	Hara Arena
3 October 1986	Biloxi	United States	Mississippi Coast Coliseum
4 October 1986	Shreveport	United States	Hirsch Coliseum
5 October 1986	Beaumont	United States	Beaumont Civic Center
7 October 1986	Dallas	United States	Reunion Arena
8 October 1986	Corpus Christi	United States	Corpus Memorial Coliseum

== Personnel ==
- Ozzy Osbourne – vocals
- Jake E. Lee – guitar
- Phil Soussan – bass
- Randy Castillo – drums
- John Sinclair – keyboards
