= No Rest for the Wicked Tour =

1988–1989 concert tour by Ozzy Osbourne

- Tour by Ozzy Osbourne
- Poster to the concert in Oakland, California. A similar layout was used for other concert posters
- Associated album: No Rest for the Wicked
- Start date: 16 November 1988
- End date: 5 August 1989
- Legs: 2 in Europe; 1 in North America; 1 in Asia; 4 total
- No. of shows: 144

Ozzy Osbourne concert chronology
- The Ultimate Sin Tour (1986); No Rest for the Wicked Tour (1988–1989); Theatre of Madness Tour (1991–1992)

The No Rest for the Wicked Tour was a concert tour by heavy metal singer Ozzy Osbourne in 1988 and 1989, supporting his album No Rest for the Wicked.

== Background ==
In 1987, Ozzy Osbourne found Zakk Wylde, who became the most enduring replacement for Randy Rhoads to date. Together they recorded No Rest for the Wicked with Randy Castillo on drums, John Sinclair on keyboards, and Bob Daisley co-writing lyrics and playing bass. The subsequent tour saw Osbourne reunited with erstwhile Black Sabbath bandmate Geezer Butler on bass. A live EP, entitled Just Say Ozzy, featuring Geezer was released two years later.

=== North America ===
Opening bands included Anthrax, White Lion and Vixen.

=== Moscow Music Peace Festival ===
Ozzy Osbourne played the Moscow Music Peace Festival on 13 August 1989.

== Set list ==
Songs played overall

1. "I Don't Know"
2. "Flying High Again"
3. "Mr Crowley"
4. "Demon Alcohol"
5. "Over the Mountain"
6. "Believer"
7. "Shot in the Dark"
8. "Bloodbath in Paradise" (and Zakk Wylde guitar solo)
9. "Sweet Leaf" (Black Sabbath cover)
10. "War Pigs" (Black Sabbath cover)
11. "Tattooed Dancer" (and Randy Castillo drum solo)
12. "Fire in the Sky"
13. "Miracle Man"
14. "Suicide Solution"
15. "Killer of Giants"
16. "Iron Man" (Black Sabbath cover) and "Crazy Train" (Encore)
17. "Bark at the Moon"
18. "Close My Eyes Forever" (Lita Ford cover)
19. "Paranoid" (Black Sabbath cover)

Typical set list (1991–1992)

1. "I Don't Know"
2. "Flying High Again"
3. "Mr. Crowley"
4. "Shot in the Dark"
5. "Bloodbath in Paradise" (and Zakk Wylde guitar solo)
6. "Sweet Leaf" (Black Sabbath cover)
7. "War Pigs" (Black Sabbath cover)
8. "Tattooed Dancer" (and Randy Castillo drum solo)
9. "Miracle Man"
10. "Suicide Solution"
11. "Iron Man" (Black Sabbath cover) and "Crazy Train" (Encore)
12. "Bark at the Moon"
13. "Paranoid" (Black Sabbath cover)

Europe

1. "Bark at the Moon"
2. "Suicide Solution"
3. "Over the Mountain"
4. "Fire in the Sky"
5. "Mr Crowley"
6. "Demon Alcohol"
7. "Shot in the Dark"
8. "I Don't Know"
9. "Flying High Again"
10. "Bloodbath in Paradise" (and Zakk Wylde guitar solo)
11. "Miracle Man"
12. "Sweet Leaf" (Black Sabbath cover)
13. "War Pigs" (Black Sabbath cover)
14. "Tattooed Dancer" (and Randy Castillo drum solo)
15. "Iron Man" (Black Sabbath cover) and "Crazy Train"
16. "Paranoid" (Black Sabbath cover) (Encore)

Moscow Music Peace Festival

1. "I Don't Know"
2. "Shot in the Dark"
3. "Suicide Solution"
4. "Tattooed Dancer"
5. "Flying High Again"
6. "Miracle Man"
7. "Sweet Leaf" (Black Sabbath cover)
8. "War Pigs" (Black Sabbath cover)
9. "Crazy Train"
10. "Paranoid" (Black Sabbath cover) (Encore)

== Tour dates ==
Date	City	Country	Venue
Pre-Tour
28 July 1987	Hammersmith	England	Wormwood Scrubs Prison
15 December 1987	New York City	United States	Hard Rock Cafe
Europe
~~23 June 1988~~	~~Dublin~~	~~Ireland~~	~~The Olympic Ballroom~~
~~24 June 1988~~	~~Dublin~~	~~Ireland~~	~~The Olympic Ballroom~~
~~25 June 1988~~	~~Belfast~~	~~Ireland~~	~~Nugent Hall~~
~~27 June 1988~~	~~Leeds~~	~~England~~	~~University of Leeds Refectory~~
~~28 June 1988~~	~~Glasgow~~	~~Scotland~~	~~Barrowlands Ballroom~~
~~29 June 1988~~	~~Manchester~~	England	~~The Ritz~~
~~1 July 1988~~	~~Newcastle~~	England	~~Mayfair Ballroom~~
~~2 July 1988~~	~~Leicester~~	England	~~Polytechnic Arena~~
~~3 July 1988~~	~~Hull~~	England	~~Hull City Hall~~
~~5 July 1988~~	~~Redcar~~	England	~~Redcar Bowl~~
~~6 July 1988~~	~~Nottingham~~	England	~~Nottingham Rock City~~
7 July 1988	Folkestone	England	Leas Cliff Hall
9 July 1988	Cambridge	England	Cambridge Corn Exchange
10 July 1988	Bristol	England	Bristol Studio Ballroom
11 July 1988	Leicester	England	Leicester Polytechnic
13 July 1988	London	England	Kentish Town & Country Club
14 July 1988	London	England	Kentish Town & Country Club
15 July 1988	Redcar	England	Redcar Bowl
17 July 1988	Hull	England	Hull City Hall
~~18 July 1988~~	~~Nottingham~~	England	~~Rock City~~
19 July 1988	Manchester	England	The Ritz
21 July 1988	Leeds	England	University of Leeds Refectory
22 July 1988	Newcastle	England	Mayfair Ballroom
23 July 1988	Glasgow	Scotland	Barrowland Ballroom
North America
16 November 1988	Pensacola	United States	Pensacola Civic Arena
17 November 1988	Atlanta	United States	Omni Coliseum
19 November 1988	Miami	United States	Miami Arena
20 November 1988	Tampa	United States	USF Sun Dome
22 November 1988	Greensboro	United States	Greensboro Coliseum
23 November 1988	Charlotte	United States	Charlotte Coliseum
25 November 1988	Hampton	United States	Hampton Coliseum
26 November 1988	Landover	United States	Capital Centre
28 November 1988	Pittsburgh	United States	Pittsburgh Civic Arena
29 November 1988	Buffalo	United States	Buffalo Memorial Auditorium
~~1 December 1988~~	Rochester	United States	Rochester Community War Memorial Arena
2 December 1988	Philadelphia	United States	The Spectrum
3 December 1988	New Haven	United States	New Haven Coliseum
5 December 1988	Uniondale	United States	Nassau Coliseum
6 December 1988	Portland	United States	Cumberland County Civic Center
8 December 1988	East Rutherford	United States	Brendan Byrne Arena
9 December 1988	Providence	United States	Providence Civic Center
10 December 1988	Worcester	United States	The Centrum
12 December 1988	Richfield	United States	Richfield Coliseum
14 December 1988	Indianapolis	United States	Market Square Arena
15 December 1988	Milwaukee	United States	Mecca Arena
17 December 1988	Rosemont	United States	Rosemont Horizon
18 December 1988	Detroit	United States	Joe Louis Arena
20 December 1988	Albany	United States	Albany Civic Center
21 December 1988	Atlanta	United States	Omni Coliseum
26 December 1988	Tucson	United States	Tucson Community Center
27 December 1988	Phoenix	United States	Arizona Veterans Memorial Coliseum
28 December 1988	San Diego	United States	San Diego Sports Arena
30 December 1988	Long Beach	United States	Long Beach Arena
31 December 1988	Long Beach	United States	Long Beach Arena
6 January 1989	Houston	United States	The Summit
7 January 1989	Shreveport	United States	Hirsch Memorial Coliseum
8 January 1989	Dallas	United States	Reunion Arena
~~9 January 1989~~	~~Oklahoma City~~	United States	~~Oklahoma State Fair Arena~~
10 January 1989	Kansas City	United States	Kemper Arena
12 January 1989	Albuquerque	United States	Tingley Coliseum
13 January 1989	Denver	United States	McNichols Sports Arena
15 January 1989	Oakland	United States	Oakland Arena
16 January 1989	Sacramento	United States	ARCO Arena
17 January 1989	Reno	United States	Lawlor Events Center
19 January 1989	Portland	United States	Portland Memorial Coliseum
20 January 1989	Seattle	United States	Seattle Center Coliseum
22 January 1989	Salt Lake City	United States	Salt Palace
25 January 1989	Bloomington	United States	Met Center
26 January 1989	Ames	United States	Hilton Coliseum
28 January 1989	Omaha	United States	Omaha Civic Auditorium
~~29 January 1989~~	~~Cedar Rapids~~	United States	~~Five Seasons Center~~
30 January 1989	St. Louis	United States	Kiel Auditorium
~~1 February 1989~~	~~Memphis~~	United States	~~Mid-South Coliseum~~
~~3 February 1989~~	~~Nashville~~	United States	~~Nashville Municipal Auditorium~~
~~5 February 1989~~	~~Johnson City~~	United States	~~Freedom Hall~~
~~6 February 1989~~	~~Fort Wayne~~	United States	~~Allen County War Memorial Coliseum~~
~~8 February 1989~~	~~Columbus~~	United States	~~Ohio Expo Coliseum~~
~~11 February 1989~~	~~Louisville~~	United States	~~Freedom Hall~~
~~13 February 1989~~	~~Cincinnati~~	United States	~~Riverfront Coliseum~~
~~16 February 1989~~	~~Saginaw~~	United States	~~Wendler Arena~~
~~18 February 1989~~	~~Toledo~~	United States	~~Toledo Sports Arena~~
Asia
27 February 1989	Tokyo	Japan	Tokyo Kōsei Nenkin Kaikan
1 March 1989	Yokohama	Japan	Yokohama Cultural Gymnasium
2 March 1989	Tokyo	Japan	Nippon Budokan
4 March 1989	Nagoya	Japan	Nagoya Civic Assembly Hall
7 March 1989	Fukuoka	Japan	Fukuoka Sunpalace
8 March 1989	Osaka	Japan	Osaka Kosei Nenkin Kaikan
10 March 1989	Osaka	Japan	Festival Hall
Europe
29 March 1989	Helsinki	Finland	Helsinki Ice Hall
31 March 1989	Stockholm	Sweden	Solnahallen
1 April 1989	Gothenburg	Sweden	Lisebergshallen
3 April 1989	Drammen	Norway	Drammenshallen
4 April 1989	Lund	Sweden	Olympen
5 April 1989	Copenhagen	Denmark	K.B. Hallen
7 April 1989	Arnhem	Netherlands	Rijnhal
8 April 1989	Brussels	Belgium	Forest National
10 April 1989	Paris	France	Zénith de Paris
11 April 1989	Villeurbanne	France	Le Transbordeur
13 April 1989	Barcelona	Spain	Palau dels Esports de Barcelona
14 April 1989	Madrid	Spain	Raimundo Saporta Pavilion
15 April 1989	San Sebastián	Spain	Velódromo de Anoeta
17 April 1989	Milan	Italy	Palatrussardi
19 April 1989	Düsseldorf	West Germany	Philips Hall
20 April 1989	Ravensburg	West Germany	Upper Swabia Hall
21 April 1989	Munich	West Germany	Rudi-Sedlmayer-Halle
23 April 1989	Vienna	Austria	Cure Hall
24 April 1989	Fürth	West Germany	Stadthalle Fürth
25 April 1989	Ludwigshafen	West Germany	Friedrich-Ebert-Halle
27 April 1989	Offenbach	West Germany	Stadthalle Offenbach
28 April 1989	Böblingen	West Germany	Sportshalle
30 April 1989	Dortmund	West Germany	Westfalenhalle (Metal Hammer Festival)
1 May 1989	Oldenburg	West Germany	Weser-Ems-Halle
3 May 1989	Birmingham	England	NEC Arena
4 May 1989	Hammersmith	England	Hammersmith Odeon
5 May 1989	Hammersmith	England	Hammersmith Odeon
North America
1 June 1989	Poughkeepsie	United States	The Chance
4 June 1989	Upper Darby	United States	Tower Theater
14 June 1989	Salisbury	United States	Wicomico Civic Center
15 June 1989	Columbia	United States	Merriweather Post Pavilion
16 June 1989	Roanoke	United States	Roanoke Civic Center
18 June 1989	Greenville	United States	Greenville Memorial Auditorium
19 June 1989	Richmond	United States	Richmond Coliseum
21 June 1989	Portland	United States	Cumberland County Civic Center
23 June 1989	New Haven	United States	New Haven Coliseum
24 June 1989	Worcester	United States	Centrum
25 June 1989	East Rutherford	United States	Brendan Byrne Arena
27 June 1989	Providence	United States	Providence Civic Center
28 June 1989	Philadelphia	United States	Spectrum
30 June 1989	Darien	United States	Lakeside Amphitheater
1 July 1989	Glens Falls	United States	Glens Falls Civic Center
2 July 1989	Middletown	United States	Orange County Fair Speedway (Westwood One/Pepsi Concert Series (#2))
4 July 1989	Weedsport	United States	Cayuga County Fair Speedway
5 July 1989	Allentown	United States	Allentown Fairgrounds
7 July 1989	Charlevoix	United States	Castle Farms
8 July 1989	Toronto	Canada	CNE Stadium
9 July 1989	Montreal	Canada	Montreal Forum
13 July 1989	Clarkston	United States	Pine Knob Music Theatre
14 July 1989	East Troy	United States	Alpine Valley Music Theater
15 July 1989	Hoffman Estates	United States	Poplar Creek Music Theater
16 July 1989	Peoria	United States	Peoria Civic Center
18 July 1989	Omaha	United States	Omaha Civic Auditorium
19 July 1989	Cedar Rapids	United States	Five Seasons Center
21 July 1989	Fort Wayne	United States	Allen County War Memorial Coliseum
22 July 1989	Louisville	United States	Louisville Gardens
24 July 1989	Cincinnati	United States	Riverfront Coliseum
25 July 1989	Noblesville	United States	Deer Creek Music Center
26 July 1989	St. Louis	United States	Kiel Auditorium
29 July 1989	Morrison	United States	Red Rocks Amphitheatre
31 July 1989	Chandler	United States	Compton Terrace
~~2 August 1989~~	Irvine	United States	Irvine Meadows Amphitheatre
3 August 1989	Irvine	United States	Irvine Meadows Amphitheatre
4 August 1989	Mountain View	United States	Shoreline Amphitheatre (Pepsi Music Festival)
5 August 1989	Sacramento	United States	ARCO Arena
Moscow Music Peace Festival (#2)
13 August 1989	Moscow	Soviet Union	Central Lenin Stadium

== Personnel ==
1987–1988

- Ozzy Osbourne – Lead vocals
- Zakk Wylde – Guitar
- Phil Soussan – Bass
- Randy Castillo – Drums
- John Sinclair – Keyboards

1988

- Ozzy Osbourne – Vocals
- Zakk Wylde – Guitar
- Bob Daisley – Bass
- Randy Castillo – Drums
- John Sinclair – Keyboards

1988–1989

- Ozzy Osbourne – Vocals
- Zakk Wylde – Guitar
- Geezer Butler – Bass
- Randy Castillo – Drums
- John Sinclair – Keyboards
