= Speak of the Devil Tour =

1982–1983 concert tour by Ozzy Osbourne

Speak of The Devil Tour
- Promotional tour by Ozzy Osbourne
- Poster to the concert in Battle Creek, Michigan. A similar layout was used for other concert posters
- Location: Europe; North America
- Associated album: Speak of the Devil
- Start date: December 10, 1982
- End date: May 29, 1983
- Legs: 2 in Europe; 1 in North America; 3 total
- No. of shows: 57

Ozzy Osbourne concert chronology
- Diary of a Madman Tour (1981–1982); Speak of the Devil Tour (1982–1983); Bark at the Moon Tour (1983–1985)

The Speak of the Devil Tour was the third solo tour by English heavy metal singer Ozzy Osbourne, in support of his first live album, Speak of the Devil, taking place from December 1982 to May 1983. The tour included two European legs, one North American leg, and a final show at the 1983 US Festival. The personnel in Osbourne's band changed several times during the tour.

== Overview ==
=== Background ===
In early 1982, Osbourne's management and record label decided that he should record a live album consisting entirely of songs by his previous band Black Sabbath, for purposes of generating royalties and fulfilling international distribution contracts, and to compete with an upcoming Black Sabbath live album. The plan was opposed by Osbourne's then-current live band (guitarist Randy Rhoads, bassist Rudy Sarzo, and drummer Tommy Aldridge), who considered an all-covers album detrimental to their careers. Plans were put on hold after the death of Rhoads in a plane crash on March 19.

After a brief period with Bernie Tormé, the guitarist position in Osbourne's band was eventually filled by Brad Gillis. The lineup of Gillis, Sarzo, and Aldridge toured with Osbourne in the Spring and Summer of 1982, ostensibly still supporting Osbourne's 1981 album Diary of a Madman, and during some additional dates in September 1982 the band played only Black Sabbath songs. Those shows were recorded and various songs were compiled for the live album Speak of the Devil, released in November 1982.

== Tour schedule and personnel changes ==
A tour to support the Speak of the Devil album was scheduled for December 1982 to April 1983. By this point bassist Rudy Sarzo had quit Osbourne's band and rejoined his previous band Quiet Riot. Sarzo was temporarily replaced by former UFO bassist Pete Way. Keyboardist Lindsay Bridgwater, who had previously played on the Blizzard of Ozz tour, also joined the touring band. This lineup performed seven shows in Europe in December 1982, after which Way and Gillis left the band, with the latter then forming Night Ranger.

After a holiday break, Osbourne recruited another temporary touring bassist, Don Costa (later of W.A.S.P.), plus former Rough Cutt guitarist Jake E. Lee, who would become a fixture in Osbourne's band for the next several years. This lineup performed a second leg of concerts in Europe in January 1983. Bridgwater then left the band and was replaced by Don Airey, who had already toured with Osbourne in 1981-82.

The North American leg of the tour began in Syracuse, New York on February 11. The following night's show at a Catholic community center in Scranton, Pennsylvania was cancelled after protests from parents and local community leaders. Similar protests led to the cancellation of a later show in Green Bay, Wisconsin. The main tour ended in early April, after which Osbourne welcomed back longtime bassist Bob Daisley, who replaced Costa for an appearance at the US Festival on May 29. The musicians at this performance (Jake E. Lee, Don Airey, Bob Daisley, and Tommy Aldridge) remained as Osbourne's backing band for his next album, Bark at the Moon, which was recorded in the following months.

== Personnel ==
Speak of the Devil live album

- Ozzy Osbourne – Vocals
- Brad Gillis – Guitar
- Rudy Sarzo – Bass
- Tommy Aldridge – Drums

United Kingdom

- Ozzy Osbourne – Vocals
- Brad Gillis – Guitar
- Pete Way – Bass
- Tommy Aldridge – Drums
- Lindsay Bridgwater – Keyboards

Europe

- Ozzy Osbourne – Vocals
- Jake E. Lee – Guitar
- Don Costa – Bass
- Tommy Aldridge – Drums
- Lindsay Bridgwater – Keyboards

North America

- Ozzy Osbourne – Vocals
- Jake E. Lee – Guitar
- Don Costa – Bass
- Tommy Aldridge – Drums
- Don Airey – Keyboards

US Festival '83

- Ozzy Osbourne – Vocals
- Jake E. Lee – Guitar
- Bob Daisley – Bass
- Tommy Aldridge – Drums
- Don Airey – Keyboards

== Setlists ==
Speak of the Devil Black Sabbath covers

1. "Symptom of the Universe"
2. "Snowblind"
3. "Black Sabbath"
4. "Fairies Wear Boots"
5. "War Pigs"
6. "The Wizard"
7. "N.I.B."
8. "Sweet Leaf"
9. "Never Say Die"
10. "Sabbath Bloody Sabbath"
11. "Iron Man"
12. "Children of the Grave"
13. "Paranoid" [encore]

Europe

"Diary of a Madman" (Introduction/ending) [Introduction]

1. "Over the Mountain"
2. "Mr Crowley"
3. "Crazy Train"
4. "Revelation Mother Earth"
5. "Steal Away the Night"
6. "Suicide Solution"
7. Brad Gillis guitar solo and instrumental band jam
8. Tommy Aldridge drum solo and instrumental band jam [Reprise]
9. "Goodbye to Romance"
10. "I Don't Know"
11. "Believer"
12. "Flying High Again"
13. "Sweet Leaf" (Black Sabbath cover)
14. "Iron Man" and "Children of the Grave" (Black Sabbath covers)
15. "Paranoid" (Black Sabbath cover) [encore]

Europe and North America

"Diary of a Madman" (Introduction/ending) [Introduction]

1. "I Don't Know"
2. "Mr Crowley"
3. "Crazy Train"
4. "Suicide Solution" [and Jake E. Lee guitar solo]
5. "Revelation Mother Earth"
6. "Steal Away the Night"
7. Tommy Aldridge drum solo
8. "Believer"
9. "Flying High Again"
10. "Fairies Wear Boots" (Black Sabbath cover)
11. "War Pigs" (Black Sabbath cover)
12. "Iron Man" and "Children of the Grave" (Black Sabbath covers)
13. "Paranoid" (Black Sabbath cover) [encore]

US Festival

"Diary of a Madman" (Introduction/ending) [Introduction]

1. "Over the Mountain"
2. "Mr Crowley"
3. "Crazy Train"
4. "Suicide Solution" [and Jake E. Lee guitar solo]
5. "Revelation Mother Earth"
6. "Steal Away the Night"
7. Tommy Aldridge drum solo
8. "I Don't Know"
9. "Flying High Again"
10. "Fairies Wear Boots" (Black Sabbath cover)
11. "Iron Man" and "Children of the Grave" (Black Sabbath covers)
12. "Paranoid" (Black Sabbath cover) [encore]

== Tour dates ==
Date	City	Country	Venue
North America (Speak of the Devil live recordings)
September 26, 1982	New York City	United States	The Ritz
September 27, 1982	New York City	United States	The Ritz
Europe
December 10, 1982	St Austell	England	Cornwall Coliseum
December 12, 1982	Birmingham	England	NEC Arena
December 14, 1982	London	England	Wembley Arena
December 16, 1982	Leeds	England	Queens Hall
December 18, 1982	Newcastle	England	Newcastle City Hall
December 19, 1982	Glasgow	Scotland	The Apollo
December 20, 1982	Liverpool	England	Royal Court Theatre
Europe
January 12, 1983	Helsinki	Finland	Helsinki Exhibition Hall
January 14, 1983	Stockholm	Sweden	Johanneshov Isstadion
January 16, 1983	Copenhagen	Denmark	Falconer Teatret
January 18, 1983	Hamburg	West Germany	Messehallen
January 19, 1983	Offenbach	West Germany	Stadthalle Offenbach
January 20, 1983	Eppelheim	West Germany	Rhein-Neckar-Halle
January 22, 1983	Lausanne	Switzerland	Palais de Beaulieu
January 24, 1983	Düsseldorf	West Germany	Philips Halle
January 25, 1983	Neunkirchen	West Germany	Hemmerleinhalle
January 26, 1983	Sindelfingen	West Germany	Messehalle
January 28, 1983	Strasbourg	France	Rhenus Hall
January 29, 1983	Paris	France	Palais des Sports
January 30, 1983	Brussels	Belgium	Forest National
~~January 31, 1983~~	Utrecht	Netherlands	Muziekcentrum Vredenburg
North America
February 11, 1983	Syracuse	United States	Onondaga County War Memorial Arena
~~February 12, 1983~~	~~Scranton~~	United States	~~Catholic Youth Center Arena~~
February 14, 1983	College Park	United States	Ritchie Coliseum
February 15, 1983	Huntington	United States	Huntington Civic Center
February 18, 1983	Charlotte	United States	Charlotte Coliseum
February 19, 1983	Augusta	United States	Augusta Civic Center
February 20, 1983	Charleston	United States	Charleston County Hall
February 23, 1983	Lakeland	United States	Lakeland Civic Center
February 24, 1983	North Fort Myers	United States	Lee County Civic Center
February 25, 1983	Pembroke Pines	United States	Hollywood Sportatorium
February 27, 1983	Montgomery	United States	Garrett Coliseum
February 28, 1983	Huntsville	United States	Von Braun Civic Center
March 1, 1983	Little Rock	United States	Barton Coliseum
March 2, 1983	Tulsa	United States	Tulsa Assembly Center
March 4, 1983	Biloxi	United States	Mississippi Coast Coliseum
March 5, 1983	Baton Rouge	United States	Baton Rouge State Fairgrounds (Ozzy Osbourne Rock 'N' Roll Party)
March 7, 1983	Corpus Christi	United States	Corpus Christi Memorial Coliseum
March 8, 1983	Houston	United States	The Summit
March 9, 1983	Austin	United States	Palmer Auditorium
March 11, 1983	Springfield	United States	Hammons Student Center
March 12, 1983	Lincoln	United States	Pershing Center
March 13, 1983	Sioux Falls	United States	Sioux Falls Arena
March 15, 1983	Davenport	United States	Palmer Alumni Auditorium
March 16, 1983	Peoria	United States	Peoria Civic Center
March 18, 1983	Battle Creek	United States	Kellogg Arena
March 19, 1983	Port Huron	United States	McMorran Arena
March 20, 1983	Muskegon	United States	L. C. Walker Arena
March 22, 1983	Rockford	United States	Rockford MetroCenter
~~March 23, 1983~~	~~Green Bay~~	United States	~~Brown County Arena~~
March 26, 1983	Mount Pleasant	United States	Rose Arena
March 27, 1983	London, Ontario	Canada	London Gardens
March 28, 1983	Sudbury	Canada	Sudbury Community Arena
March 30, 1983	Quebec City	Canada	Colisée de Québec
March 31, 1983	Rimouski	Canada	Colisée de Rimouski
~~April 1, 1983~~	~~Worcester~~	United States	~~The Centrum~~
April 2, 1983	Atlantic City	United States	Atlantic City Convention Hall
April 4, 1983	Worcester	United States	The Centrum
April 5, 1983	Glens Falls	United States	Glens Falls Civic Center
April 6, 1983	Poughkeepsie	United States	Mid-Hudson Civic Center
US Festival (Heavy Metal Day)
May 29, 1983	San Bernardino	United States	Glen Helen Pavilion
