= Lansing Center =

American convention center

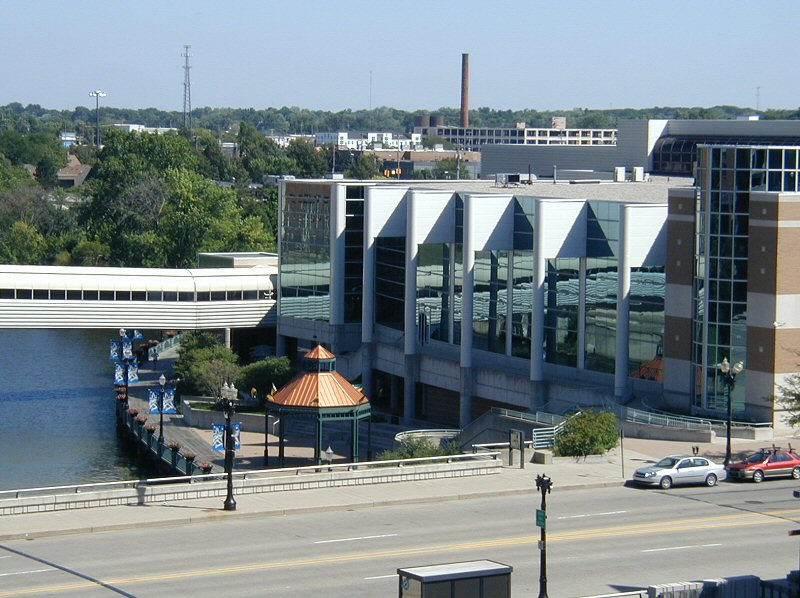
- Lansing Center along the Grand River
- Interactive map of Lansing Center
- Location: 333 East Michigan Avenue; Lansing, MI 48933; United States
- Coordinates: 42°44′03″N 84°32′53″W
- Owner: City of Lansing
- Operator: Legends/ASM Global (via LEPFA)

Construction
- Opened: 1987
- Renovated: 2007–2008
- Expanded: 1995

Website
- www.lansingcenter.com

Lansing Center, officially the Lansing Convention Center, is the primary and largest convention center in Lansing, Michigan, and the only convention center in Michigan's capital region. Located at 333 East Michigan Avenue in downtown Lansing, the center sits along the north bank of the Grand River, two blocks from the Michigan State Capitol. The center is connected to the DoubleTree by Hilton Lansing hotel by an enclosed, climate-controlled skybridge spanning the Grand River, and is located across the street from Jackson Field, home of the Lansing Lugnuts minor league baseball team.

Since 1996, the center has been overseen by the Lansing Entertainment & Public Facilities Authority (LEPFA), a non-profit independent authority of the City of Lansing. In 2025, LEPFA contracted management operations to Legends/ASM Global under a five-year agreement.

== History ==
=== Origins and construction ===
The Lansing Center succeeded the earlier Lansing Civic Center, which was demolished in 1999.

The Lansing Center was designed by the architecture firm Hellmuth, Obata & Kassabaum (HOK) and opened in 1987. At opening, the facility employed approximately 20 full-time workers and between 20 and 50 part-time workers depending on the season.

=== Expansion and renovations ===
In 1995, the center underwent a major expansion designed by Hobbs + Black Associates, significantly increasing its footprint. The center was further renovated in 2007 and 2008 in its first extensive renovation since the 1995 addition. The work included both cosmetic upgrades and structural improvements.

=== Management ===
LEPFA was established in 1996 as an independent authority responsible for the management and supervision of the Lansing Center and other city-owned venues, including Jackson Field and Groesbeck Golf Course. The authority's mission is to provide professional management of operations, marketing, and maintenance for its facilities while serving as a catalyst for local and regional economic growth. LEPFA is governed by a board of commissioners appointed under the administration of the City of Lansing.

Scott Keith served as LEPFA's president and CEO from 2010 to 2024, having joined the organization in 2001 as operations manager. Under his tenure, LEPFA venues achieved more than 25,000 directly attributable hotel room nights in a single year for the first time in the center's history. Keith departed in April 2024 to manage venues in North Charleston, South Carolina with ASM Global.

On July 1, 2025, Legends/ASM Global assumed management of the Lansing Center, Jackson Field, and Groesbeck Golf Course under a five-year contract with LEPFA. The agreement also included maintenance services for Jackson Field and management of Groesbeck Golf Course, which is scheduled to celebrate its centennial in 2026.

== Facilities ==
The center encompasses approximately 270,000 square feet (25,000 m^{2}) of total space. Its principal spaces include:

- A column-free main exhibition hall of approximately 72,000 square feet (6,700 m^{2}), divisible for smaller events, with 40 feet (12 m) ceilings and entry doors measuring 11 by 12 feet (3.4 m × 3.7 m)
- A 13,320 square feet (1,237 m^{2}) divisible ballroom
- 20 breakout and meeting rooms configurable for groups of 70 to 300
- A riverfront plaza used for outdoor events
- In-house catering facilities with a full kitchen
- A restaurant and lounge
- A 500-space underground parking garage (with an additional 430 surface spaces)
- State-of-the-art audio/visual equipment

The exhibition hall can seat up to 6,000 in theater configuration, 3,900 for banquets, or 3,800 in classroom setup. The facility is ADA-accessible and is LEED-certified.

== Events and economic impact ==
The Lansing Center hosts a wide range of conventions, trade shows, consumer shows, banquets, weddings, and special events. As of 2012, the center had hosted more than 10,000 events and attracted over nine million visitors since opening. In 2024, LEPFA venues and special events drew more than 472,000 visitors to Lansing, generating an estimated economic impact of more than $37 million to the local economy.

Notable recurring events at the center have included the Greater Lansing Sports Hall of Fame induction ceremony, the Capital City Comic Con, the Mid-Michigan Women's Expo, the annual Martin Luther King Jr. Day celebration, and the 2023 National Horseshoe Pitchers Association World Tournament. The center's location within a 90-minute drive of approximately 90 percent of Michigan's population has been cited as a key advantage for attracting statewide and regional events.

== Location ==
The Lansing Center is situated along the Grand River in the heart of downtown Lansing. It is located across the street from Jackson Field and adjacent to the Adado Riverfront Park, which hosted the Common Ground Music Festival, an annual multi-day music festival co-produced by LEPFA through Center Park Productions beginning in 2000.

== See also ==
- Lansing Civic Center
- Common Ground Music Festival
- Jackson Field
