= Fair Park Coliseum =

Fair Park Coliseum may refer to:

- Fair Park Coliseum (Beaumont, Texas), multi-purpose arena in Beaumont, Texas
- Fair Park Coliseum (Dallas, Texas), multi-purpose arena in Dallas, Texas
- The Fair Park Coliseum at the South Plains Fairgrounds in Lubbock, Texas
