= Lansing Civic Center =

- Interactive map of Lansing Civic Center
- Former names: Lansing Civic Arena (1987–1999)
- Location: 525 West Allegan Street; Lansing, MI; United States
- Coordinates: 42°43′55″N 84°33′33″W
- Owner: City of Lansing (1955–1997); State of Michigan (1997–1999)

Construction
- Opened: 1955
- Closed: 1997
- Demolished: 1999

The Lansing Civic Center was a convention center and arena located in downtown Lansing, Michigan, at 525 West Allegan Street on the southeast corner of West Allegan and South Pine Streets. It opened in 1955 with a 6,500-seat auditorium and served for over four decades as the capital region's primary venue for concerts, conventions, and civic events. The center was renamed the Lansing Civic Arena in 1987 to avoid confusion with the newly opened Lansing Center. The building was sold to the State of Michigan in 1997 and demolished in 1999.

== History ==
The Civic Center was built during a period of significant civic construction in Lansing under Mayor Ralph W. Crego, who served from 1943 to 1961. During the 1950s, the city also constructed a new city hall, fire stations, and an airport terminal.

Although designed as a convention center, the venue became widely known as a concert and entertainment destination. Notable performers who appeared at the Civic Center included Buddy Holly (1958), Duke Ellington (1957 and 1962), Roy Orbison and Carl Perkins (1958), Chubby Checker, Fats Domino, and Bo Diddley (1961), and artists from the Motortown Revue (1963) including Marvin Gaye, The Miracles, Mary Wells, Martha and the Vandellas, and Stevie Wonder. The venue also hosted circuses, trade shows, and other community events.

The Civic Center hosted the Michigan Constitutional Convention of 1961–1962, at which delegates drafted the Michigan Constitution of 1963.

== Decline and demolition ==
When the Lansing Center opened in 1987, the older facility was renamed the Lansing Civic Arena to distinguish the two venues. The arena continued to host concerts and events through the 1990s.

The building was sold to the State of Michigan in 1997. Plans to convert it into state office space were abandoned because of the high renovation costs, and the building was demolished in 1999.

== Legacy ==
A six-story state office building known as Constitution Hall was constructed on the site and completed in 2001. In May 2025, Michigan Governor Gretchen Whitmer signed an executive order renaming it the Deborah A. Stabenow Building in honor of former U.S. Senator Debbie Stabenow.
