= Timber Ridge Ski Area =

Ski area in Michigan, United States

Coordinates: 42.391711°N 85.779052°W

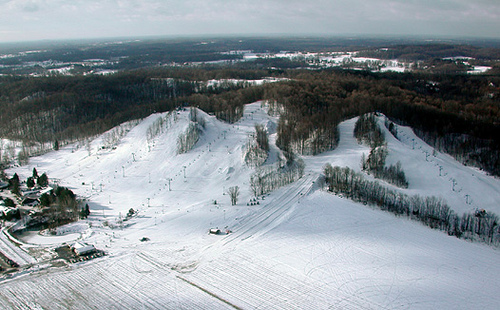
Picture of Timber Ridge Ski Area

Timber Ridge is a ski area located in Pine Grove Township, Van Buren County, near Gobles, Michigan. It is family oriented ski area that has eight ski lifts, two terrain parks, and a tubing park. The terrain difficulty ranges from beginner to advanced, where most of the trails are at easy or intermediate levels. Timber Ridge Ski Patrol was named the National Ski Patrol's 2007-2008 Central Division Outstanding Large Patrol.

== History ==
When Timber Ridge opened in 1961, the ski area had only one lift. This lift was a tow rope that was powered by a 1949 Chevy. The cost to use this tow rope at this time was 50 cents. In 1967 the lift cost increased to $3.00 during the week and $3.50 on the weekends. The cost to rent skis at that time was $4.00.Snowboards were not around at this time. The first three volunteers at Timber Ridge all have runs named after them. The rest of the runs at Timber Ridge are named after trees.

The lodge at Timber Ridge holds Snowshoe Bar and Cedar Chalet. Food and beverages can be found at both of these places. There is also a picnic area inside the lodge for those people who bring food to the ski area. The lodge was originally the Shelbyville Train Station Depot and was bought for $1.

== Trails ==
Timber Ridge has 15 total trails. Seven are easy, five are average, and three are advanced in difficulty. The highest point at Timber Ridge is 850 feet (260 m) above sea level. The lowest point is at 610 feet (190 m). The longest vertical drop is 240 feet (73 m). There are 50 acres (200,000 m^{2}) of skiable terrain, every acre of which can produce its own snow. The mountain gets about five feet of powder a season. Dean's Pass, Burt's Road, and Harry's Hollow are all named after the first three volunteers that worked at Timber Ridge. The rest of the runs at Timber Ridge are named after trees.

Easiest

- Pumpkin Patch
- Deans Pass
- Burt's Road
- Harry's Hollow
- Crossover
- Willow
- Pine Rope

More Difficult

- Oak
- Tamarack
- Sycamore
- Lumber Jack
- Sequoia

Most Difficult

- Hemlock
- Walnut

== Lifts ==
There are eight total ski lifts. These are:

- 2 double lifts
- 1 triple lift
- 1 quad lift
- 3 towropes
- 1 surface lift

== Cost ==
=== Tickets ===
Adult tickets can be bought on a full-day or night-time basis. Prices range from $18 to $35. Junior lift tickets (for anyone age 8-11) range from $15 to $25 in cost. Children under the age of seven ski for free with a purchase of an adult ticket. Season passes can be bought in groups of one to seven and range in price from $239 to $1339. In addition to being able to ski for free at Timber Ridge, anyone who buys a season pass will also receive half price lift tickets at Caberfae Peaks and Shanty Creek ski areas.

=== Rentals ===
Snowboards can be rented for $5 per hour with a two-hour minimum, or rented for a full day for $25. Adult skis can either be rented for a half day or full day. Prices range from $15 for half-day weekday rentals to $19 for a full day on holidays. Junior (for skiers aged 8–11) ski rentals range from $10 to $16.

== Tubing Hill ==
Timber Ridge offers a tubing run for those over the age of 5 years. The cost of a tubing ticket is $15 for adults and juniors.

== Events ==
=== Kalamazoo Ski & Snowboard Festival ===
This event takes place early in the season. It includes an open rail jam competition, live music, vendor booths, discounts on gear, prizes, and more. It concludes with a ski video.

=== airZ and railZ ===
airZ and railZ takes place in early February. It is a terrain park event geared towards experienced skiers and snowboarders. However, there are categories for intermediate level skiers and riders. The intermediate level takes place in the pumpkin park and is single elimination. The advanced competition is held in the timber park with the format being that each rider gets two judged runs. The top eight snowboarders and skiers compete against each other. The categories are intermediate freeskier, intermediate snowboarder, advanced freeskier, advanced snowboarder and ladies.

=== Kids Rule the Ridge ===
This January event is for kids. Kid-friendly ski races, a bounceland, and face painting are just a few of the activities that take place during this event.

=== Winterfest ===
Held in February Winterfest a three-day-long celebration that is filled with activities. The event features theme nights on Friday and Saturday with local bands performing. During the day on Saturday and Sunday activities include ice sculpting, snow sculpting and sled races.

=== Friday Night Fights ===
A competition held between Swiss Valley Ski Resort and Timber Ridge. The snowboarders and skiers of both of these ski areas compete on the terrain park to see who's best. This competition takes place over six nights with the competition alternating between each ski area. The winner of this event gets to have the traveling trophy at their ski area.

=== NASTAR Races ===
NASTAR is an organized ski-racing league that holds some events at Timber Ridge. It uses a handicap system that allows skiers of all skill levels to compete. Timber Ridge also provides a track for local racers to practice on.
