= Draken (movie theater) =

Cinema and music venue in Stockholm, Sweden

Coordinates: 59°19′54″N 18°01′37″E

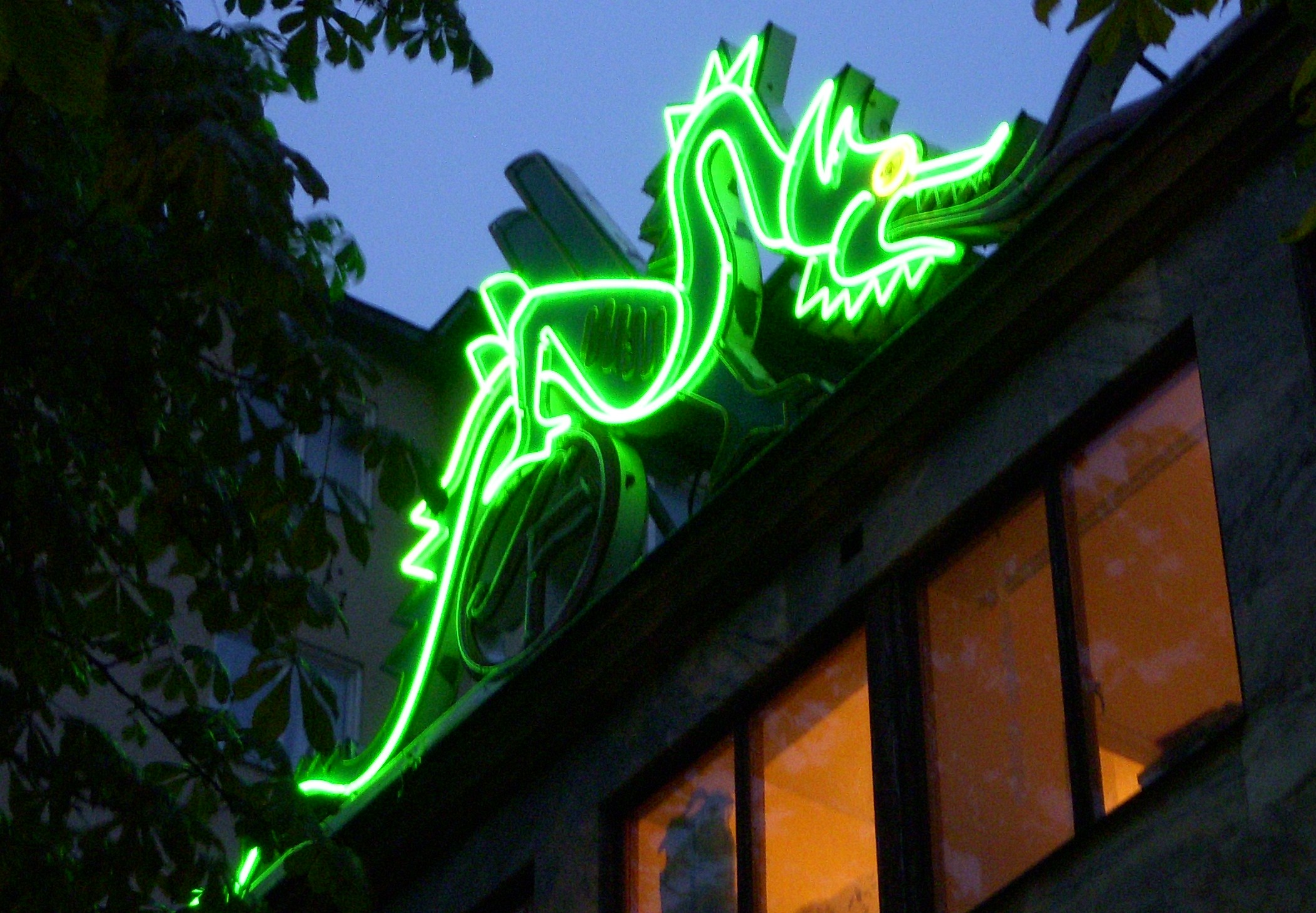
The outdoor Dragon neon sign

Draken (English: The Dragon) was a cinema and music venue located in Stockholm, Sweden. It opened in 1938 as one of Stockholm's biggest cinemas, featuring a capacity of 1,125 people. The architect was Ernst Grönwall with assistance of Olle Zetterberg. The neon sign outside was drawn by the artist Ragnar Person and made by Ruben Morne. It became one of the best known neon signs in Sweden.

During the 1980s it was a very popular concert venue with many notable performances by artists such as Def Leppard, Dio, Ozzy Osbourne and Camel. The venue was closed in 1996 and in 2010 turned into a self storage facility.
