= Espace Balard =

Espace Balard was a major music venue located in Paris, France. It was particularly popular in the early to mid-1980s hosting many notable artists, such as Ozzy Osbourne, Judas Priest, Dio, Metallica, Kiss, Ted Nugent, Blue Öyster Cult, Black Sabbath, Iron Maiden, U2, Whitesnake, Peter Gabriel and Motörhead.
