= IJsselhallen =

Events venue in Zwolle, the Netherlands

Coordinates: 52°30′41″N 6°04′49″E

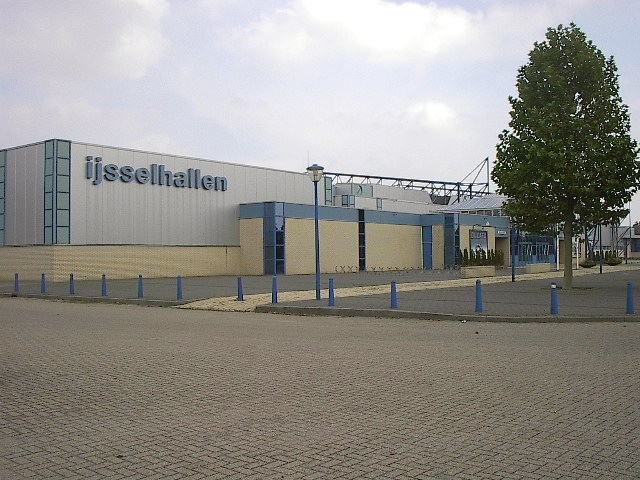
IJsselhallen

IJsselhallen was a convention center located in Zwolle, Netherlands, which has hosted many concerts. It hosted Legoland 2010. IJsselhallen has a floor space of 20,000 m^{2} and was built in 1972. The IJsselhallen proposed to host the Eurovision Song Contest 2020 but pulled out because it is too small, the roof is too low and the capacity would not reach the EBU’s requirement.

In 2024, most of the IJsselhallen were demolished. The Bogenhal, the oldest section, was preserved. The municipal council intends to use it for, among other things, a catering facility and office space. The freed-up site will be used for housing development. There are plans for 750 homes. The municipality of Zwolle is looking for another location for a new hall of smaller dimensions.
