= Rhein-Neckar-Halle =

Indoor arena in Eppelheim, Germany

Coordinates: 49°23′39″N 8°37′59″E

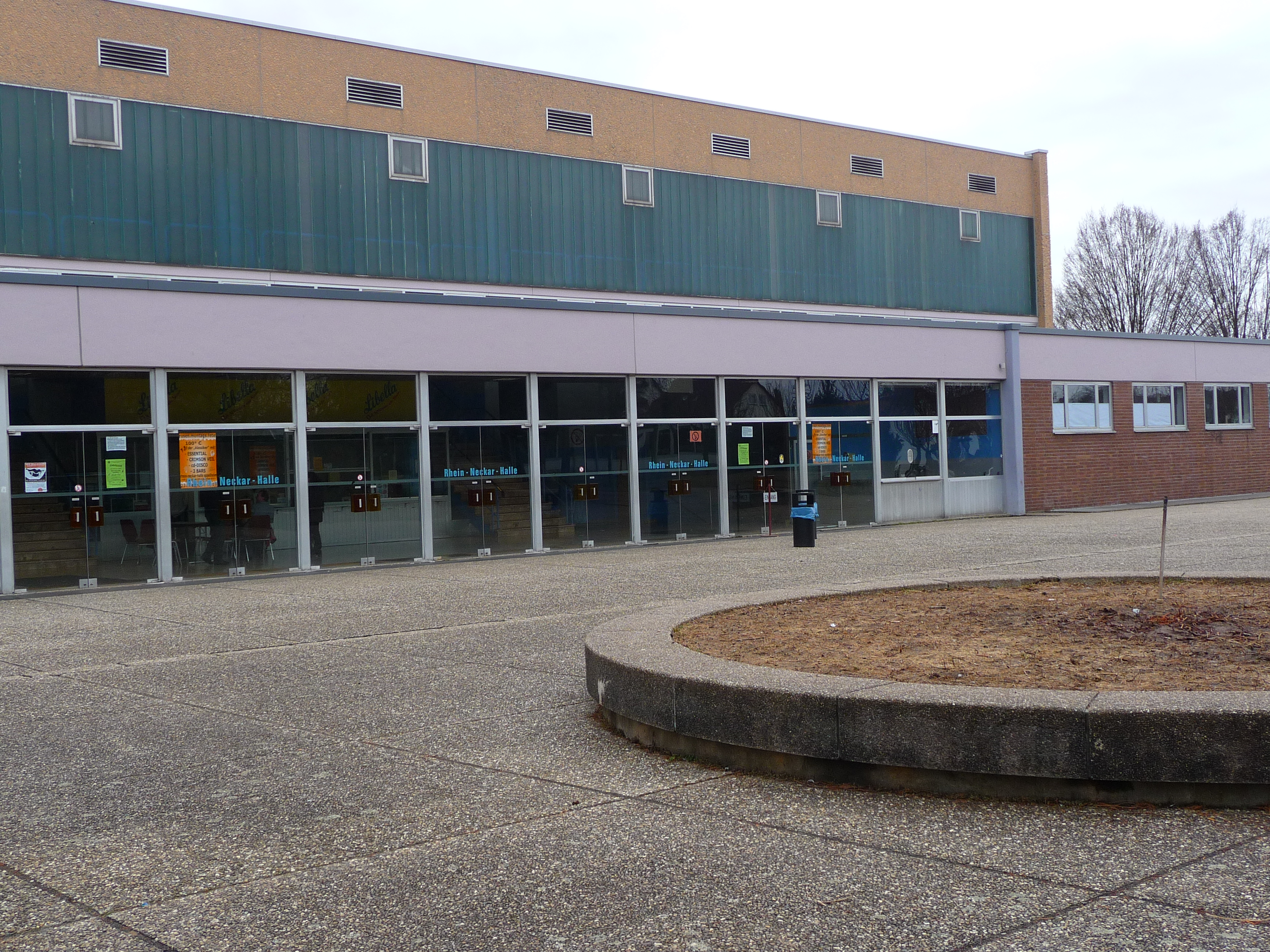
Rhein-Neckar-Halle

Rhein-Neckar-Halle is an 8,000-capacity indoor arena located in Eppelheim, Germany. Built and opened in 1970, it hosted many big music industry stars throughout the 1970s to the 1990s, including Frank Zappa, Tina Turner, Bob Marley and the Wailers, ZZ Top, Metallica, Genesis, Rush and AC/DC. It also served as a sports events for the Humboldt-Realschule High School.

In 2012, new fire safety regulations were enacted upon the arena, and it closed its door for live concerts, being designated for school sports only. As of today, the venue has been superseded as the main indoor arena in the region by other venues such as the Maimarkt-Halle and the SAP-Arena in nearby Mannheim. It will also get a new competitor in a new, under-construction arena in Heidelberg which is due to be completed in spring 2020.
