= Birmingham Odeon =

Cinema in Birmingham, England

Coordinates: 52°28′41.88″N 1°53′49.2″W

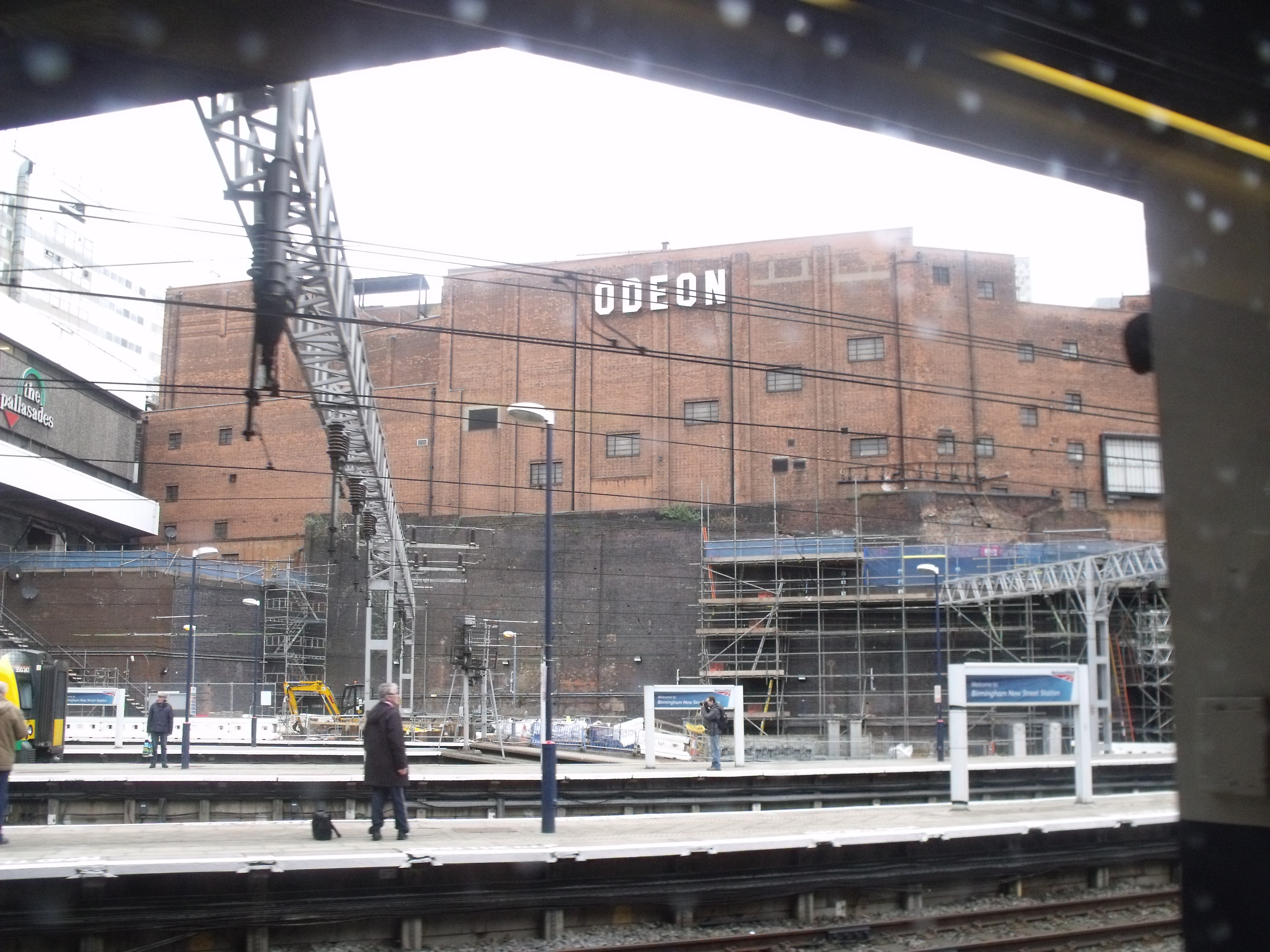
- Side view of the cinema from New Street railway station (c.2012)
- Former names: Paramount Theatre (1937-42)

General information
- Location: City Centre, 139 New St; Birmingham B2 4NU England
- Opened: 4 September 1937
- Renovated: 1965; 1988; 1991; 1998
- Owner: Odeon Cinemas Group

Design and construction
- Architects: Thomas Verity; Sam Beverley
- Known for: Concert venue (1955-88)

Website
- Official Website

The Birmingham Odeon is a cinema and former concert venue located in Birmingham, England.

== History ==
It originally opened in 1937 as the Paramount Theatre, featuring a seating capacity of 2,439. It was built on land made vacant by the removal of King Edward VI School to its new home in Edgbaston.

The cinema received its current name in 1942 after it was purchased by Oscar Deutsch's Odeon Cinemas chain. During the 1960s to the mid-1980s it was a very popular venue for concerts.The Beatles performed at the Odeon in 1964, as did The Rolling Stones with Ike & Tina Turner and The Yardbirds in 1966. Bob Dylan also appeared at the Odeon on his landmark 1966 tour. The venue has also hosted bands such as The Who in 1971, Led Zeppelin and Emerson, Lake and Palmer in 1972, and Queen in 1975. The Ramones performed here in 1980 and 1986. Iron Maiden performed here in 1980, 1981, 1982, 1986. In 1988 the auditorium was divided into six screens (with two further screens installed in other parts of the building during the early 1990s), ultimately forming an eight screen multiplex with an overall seating capacity of 1,732.

The rear aspect of the building occupies a striking position overlooking the railway tracks at the southeastern approach to New Street station.
