= Fukuoka Sunpalace =

Hotel and concert hall complex in Hakata-ku, Fukuoka, Japan

Coordinates: 33.6038°N 130.4020°E

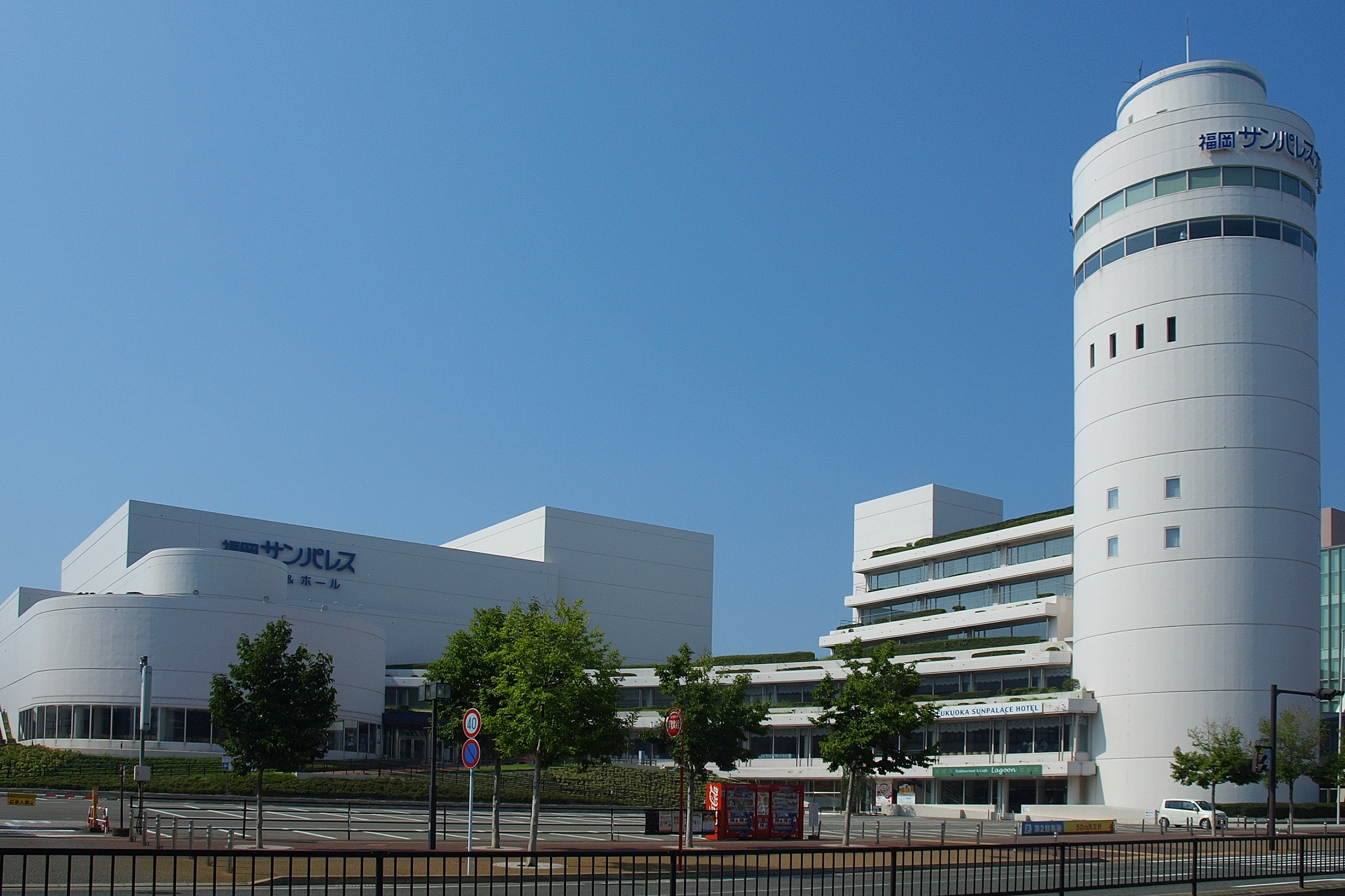
Fukuoka Sunpalace

Fukuoka Sunpalace (福岡サンパレス, Fukuoka Sanparesu) is a hotel and concert hall complex in Hakata-ku, Fukuoka, Japan. The hall has a seating capacity of 2,316, and has hosted international bands and performers such as A-ha, Iron Maiden, Gloria Estefan and Miami Sound Machine, Roxette, Rainbow, Bon Jovi, Ringo Starr, Rush, and Phil Collins.
