= Hemmerleinhalle =

Coordinates: 49.6059°N 11.1334°E

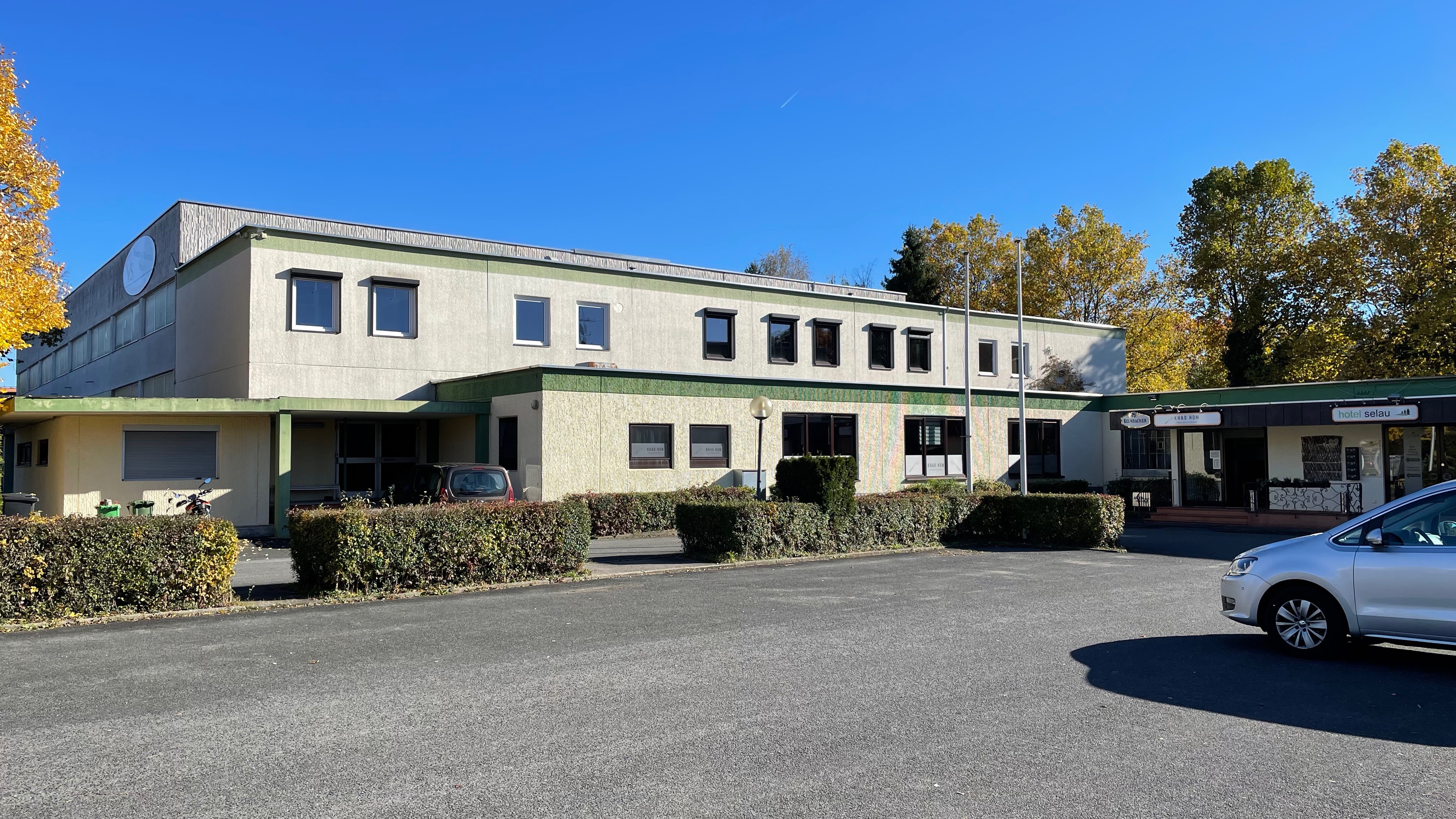
Former Hemmerleinhalle in 2021

The Hemmerleinhalle was a music venue with a capacity for 3500 people, located in Neunkirchen am Brand, Germany. Many well-known artists performed at the venue such as Dire Straits, Kiss, Bon Jovi, Black Sabbath, Slayer, Metallica, Iron Maiden in 1980, 1982, and twice in 1983, Rush, AC/DC, The Kinks, Whitesnake, Ozzy Osbourne, Frank Zappa and Thin Lizzy. It opened in 1973 and closed in 1988.
