= Nagoya Civic Assembly Hall =

Concert hall in Shōwa-ku, Nagoya, Japan

Coordinates: 35°09′24″N 136°55′09″E

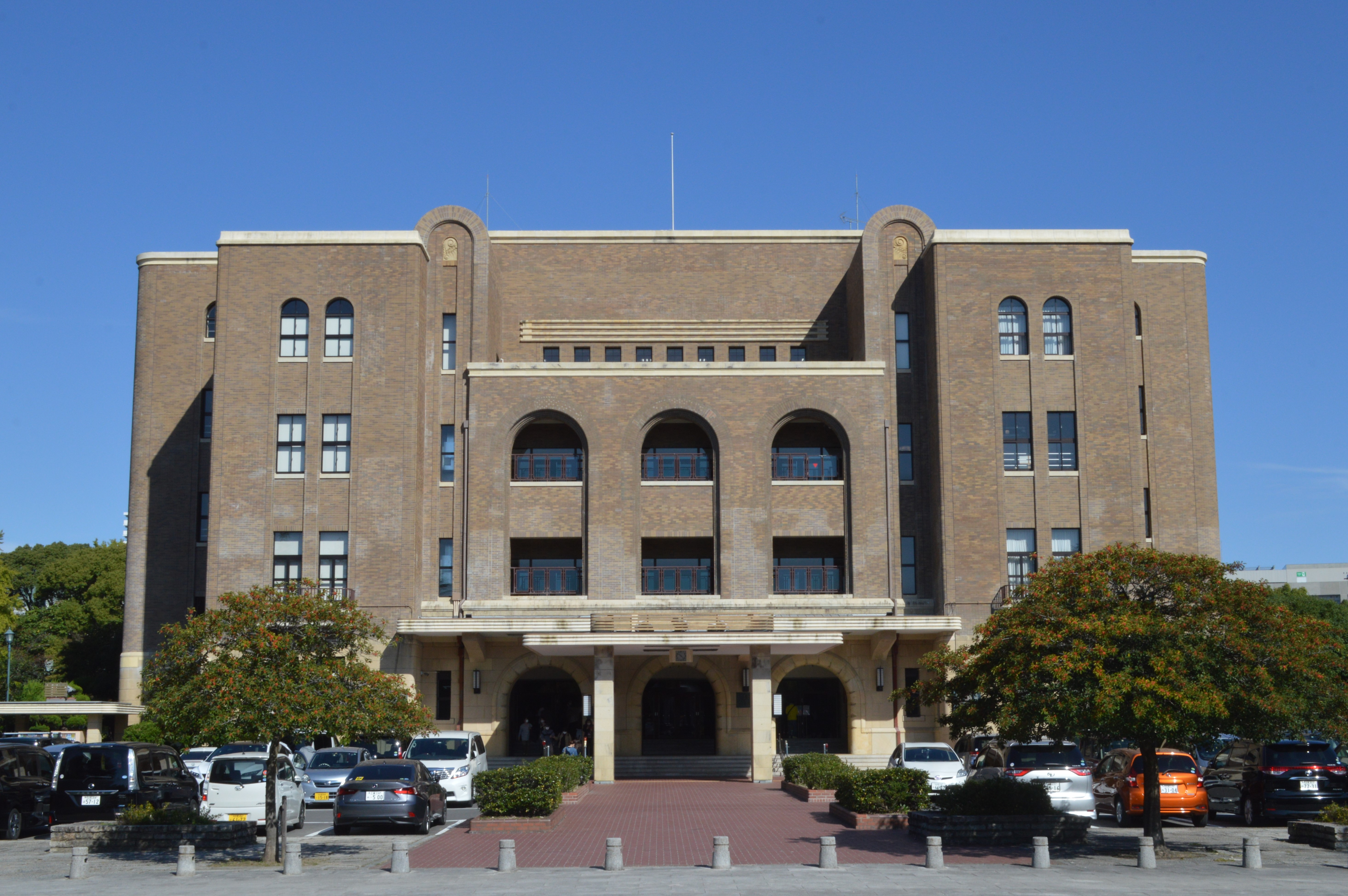
Nagoya Civic Assembly Hall

Nagoya Civic Assembly Hall (名古屋市公会堂, Nagoya-shi Kōkaidō) is a concert and civic hall located in Tsuruma Park, Shōwa-ku, Nagoya, Japan.

Opened on 10 October 1930 to commemorate the marriage of Emperor Hirohito, the 3,000-seat hall was hailed at the time as one of the largest auditoriums in the country.

The reinforced-concrete building survived the World War II air raids and the subsequent Allied requisition and remains one of the city’s best-preserved examples of early Shōwa period public architecture.

== Architecture and facilities ==
The exterior presents a symmetrical composition with tall arched windows and vertical ribbed pilasters; the interior was renovated in 2018–2019 with historically sensitive seating supplied by the original manufacturer, Kotobuki Seating, restoring the 1930 colour palette and art deco motifs.

- Main Hall: 2,000 seats (all new, wider seats with 550 mm pitch)
- Small Hall: 300 seats, used for lectures, community theater, and rehearsals
- Foyer & exhibition galleries: available for civic and corporate events

== Cultural use ==
Besides classical concerts by the Nagoya Philharmonic and visiting orchestras, the hall has long served as a key boxing venue for the Japan Boxing Commission, hosting national title fights since the 1950s. Pop, rock, and comedy tours (including King Crimson in 2021). Nearby universities, such as the Nagoya Institute of Technology, hold graduation ceremonies at the venue.

== Recent history ==
A major refurbishment began in 2018, upgrading barrier-free access, stage machinery, and air-conditioning while retaining the historic façade; the hall reopened in April 2019. In 2023 the city government announced a digital-archive project to publish 3-D scans of the interior for virtual tourism.

== Access ==
1-1-3 Tsuruma, Shōwa-ku, Nagoya 466-0064

3-min walk from Tsurumai Station (JR Chūō Line & Tsurumai Subway Line). Public parking is available beneath Tsuruma Park.
