= Stevie Ray Vaughan discography =

Cataloging of published recordings by Stevie Ray Vaughan

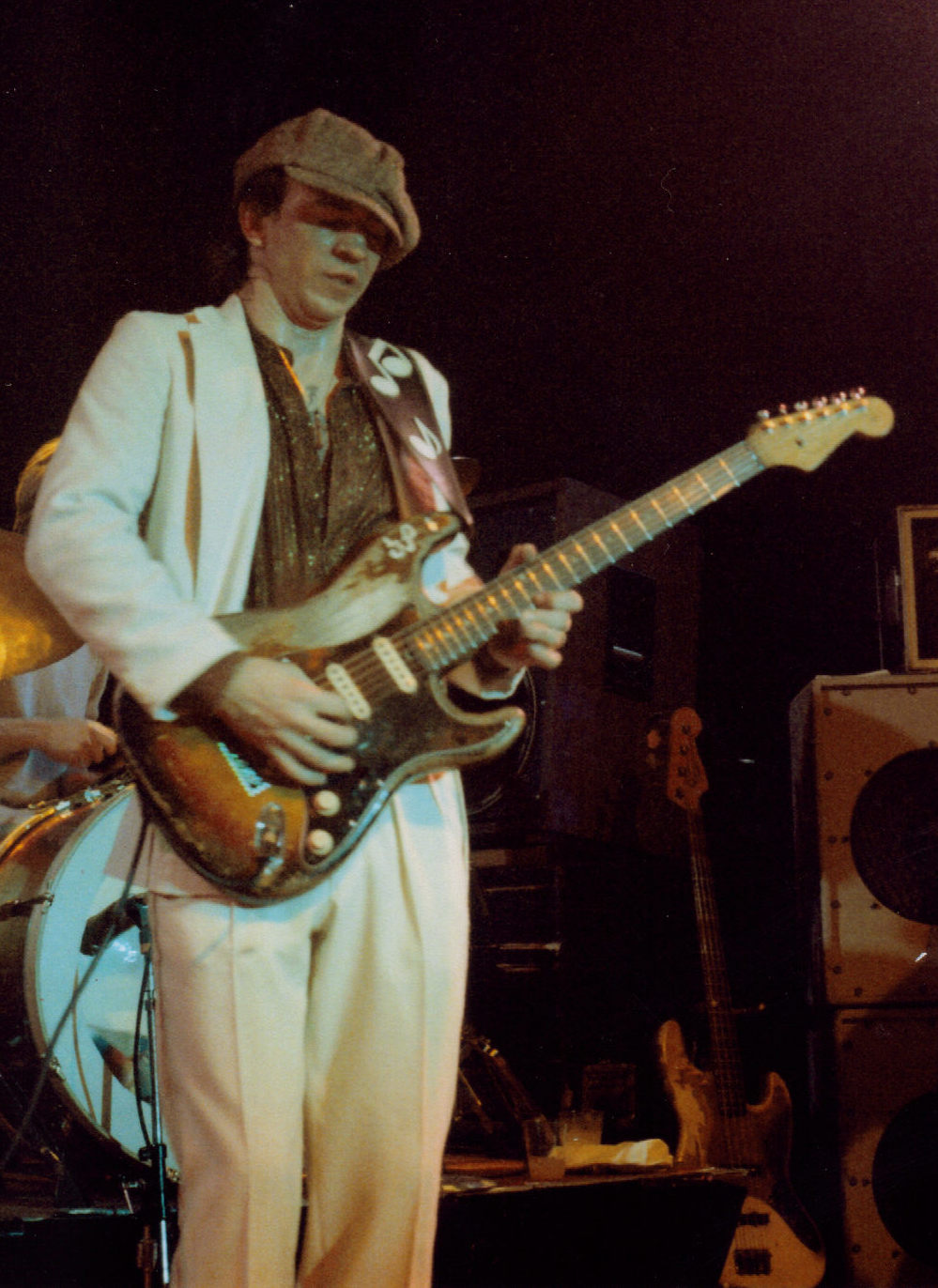
- Studio albums: 6
- Extended plays: 4
- Live albums: 7
- Compilation albums: 9
- Singles: 33
- Video albums: 5
- Music videos: 8
- With other artists: 21

Stevie Ray Vaughan was an American blues rock guitarist, singer, and songwriter, and the frontman for the band Double Trouble. He is often regarded as one of the greatest guitarists and blues musicians of all time. During his career, he released four studio albums, one live album, and several singles.

At the time of his death on August 27, 1990, Stevie Ray Vaughan left behind a large collection of recordings. Over the years, his record companies have continued to issue his music in various formats. Since Jimmie Vaughan, his brother, took control of his intellectual property rights after his death, over 12 Vaughan albums have appeared in the main U.S. albums chart. Several of these have also placed in charts in more than six countries around the world. After his death, Vaughan's record company Sony Music Entertainment continued to issue his albums. These posthumous releases comprise studio outtakes/alternate takes, jams, and live recordings.

== Albums ==
=== Studio albums ===
| Title | Album details | Peak chart positions | | Certifications |
| Title | Album details | US | AUS | Certifications |
|---|---|---|---|---|
| Texas Flood | Released: 1983; Label: Epic / Legacy; Format: | 38 | 46 | US: 2× Platinum; CAN: Platinum |
| Couldn't Stand the Weather | Released: 1984; Label: Epic; Format: | 31 | 20 | US: 2× Platinum; AUS: Gold; CAN: Platinum |
| Soul to Soul | Released: 1985; Label: Epic / Legacy; Format: | 34 | 27 | CAN: Gold; US: Platinum |
| In Step | Released: June 1989; Label: Epic / Legacy; Format: | 33 | 36 | CAN: Gold; US: 2× Platinum |
| Family Style | with Jimmie Vaughan as the Vaughan Brothers; Released: September 1990; Label: Epic; Format: CD, CS, LP | 7 | 17 | US: Platinum; CAN: Platinum |
| The Sky Is Crying | Released: November 5, 1991; Label: Epic; Format: CD, CS, LP, Mini CD | 10 | 33 | US: 2× Platinum; CAN: Platinum |

=== Live albums ===
| Title | Album details | Peak chart positions | | Certifications |
| Title | Album details | US | AUS | Certifications |
|---|---|---|---|---|
| Live Alive | Released: November 15, 1986; Recorded: 1985–1986; Label: Epic; Format: | 52 | 49 | US: Platinum; CAN: Platinum |
| In the Beginning | Released: October 6, 1992; Recorded: April 1, 1980; Label: Epic; Format: | 58 | — | US: Gold |
| Live at Carnegie Hall | Released: July 29, 1997; Recorded: October 4, 1984; Label: Epic; Format: | 40 | — | US: Gold |
| In Session | Albert King with Stevie Ray Vaughan; Released: August 17, 1999; Recorded: December 6, 1983; Label: Epic (7501); Formats: CD, LP, SACD | 52 | — | |
| Live at Montreux 1982 & 1985 | Released: November 20, 2001; Recorded: July 17, 1982 and July 15, 1985; Label: Epic; Format: 2-disc CD | 178 | — | |
| Live in Tokyo | Released: July 11, 2006; Recorded: January 24, 1985; Label: Masterplan; Format: CD | — | — | |
| The Fire Meets the Fury | with Jeff Beck; Released: March 19, 2012; Recorded: 1989; Label: Smokin' Records; Format: CD | — | — | |

=== Compilations and box sets ===
| Title | Album details | Peak chart positions | | Certifications |
| Title | Album details | US | AUS | Certifications |
|---|---|---|---|---|
| Greatest Hits | Released: October 31, 1995; Label: Epic (66217); Format: CD | 39 | 62 | US: 2× Platinum |
| The Real Deal: Greatest Hits Volume 2 | Released: March 23, 1999; Label: Epic/Legacy (65873); Format: CD | 53 | — | US: Gold |
| Blues at Sunrise | Released: April 4, 2000; Label: Epic/Legacy (63842); Format: CD | 80 | — | |
| SRV | Released: November 21, 2000; Label: Epic/Legacy (65714); Format: Box set 3CD + 1DVD | 148 | — | US: Gold |
| The Essential Stevie Ray Vaughan and Double Trouble | Released: October 1, 2002; Label: Epic/Legacy (86423); Format: 2CD | 165 | — | US: Gold |
| Martin Scorsese Presents the Blues: Stevie Ray Vaughan | Released: September 9, 2003; Label: Epic (512576-2); Format: CD | 99 | — | |
| The Real Deal: Greatest Hits Volume 1 | Released: December 26, 2006; Label: Legacy (82876-81511-2); Format: CD | — | — | |
| Solos, Sessions & Encores | Released: November 6, 2007; Label: Epic/Legacy (82876-87231-2); Format: CD | — | — | |
| The Best of Stevie Ray Vaughan | Released: November 19, 2007; Label: Sony BMG Music Entertainment; Format: CD | — | — | |

== Extended plays ==
| Title | EP details | Track listing |
|---|---|---|
| Tick Tock | Released: September 1990; Labels: Epic (6563523) (Austria); Format: CD maxi single | 1. "Tick Tock"; 2. "Brothers"; 3. "Couldn't Stand the Weather" |
| The Sky Is Crying | Released: October 1991; Labels: Epic (6576752) (Austria); Format: CD maxi single | 1. "The Sky Is Crying"; 2. "May I Have a Talk with You"; 3. "Hard to Be" |
| Little Wing | Released: October 1991; Labels: Epic (6579352) (Austria); Format: CD maxi single | 1. "Little Wing"; 2. "Wham" (live); 3. "Life by the Drop" |
| Little Wing | Released: 1992; Labels: Epic (XPCD 187) (UK, Canada); Format: CD; Notes: Promo sampler included with Live at the El Mocambo VHS | 1. "Little Wing"; 2. "Tick Tock" |

== Singles ==
| Year | Single | Chart positions | | Album |
| Year | Single | US Rock | UK | Album |
|---|---|---|---|---|
| 1977 | "Other Days"/"Texas Clover" (w/ Paul Ray & the Cobras) | - | - | N/A |
| 1979 | "My Song"/"Rough Edges" (w/ W. C. Clark and Paul Ray & the Cobras) | - | - | N/A |
| 1983 | "Love Struck Baby"/"Rude Mood" | - | - | Texas Flood |
| 1983 | "Love Struck Baby"/"Lenny (instrumental)" | - | - | Texas Flood |
| 1983 | "Pride And Joy"/"Rude Mood" | 20 | - | Texas Flood |
| 1984 | "Voodoo Child (Slight Return)" | 26 | - | Couldn't Stand The Weather |
| 1984 | "Cold Shot" | 29 | - | Couldn't Stand The Weather |
| 1984 | "Couldn't Stand The Weather" | - | - | Couldn't Stand The Weather |
| 1985 | "Look At Little Sister"/"Say What!" | 17 | - | Soul To Soul |
| 1985 | "Change It"/"Lookin' Out The Window" | 17 | - | Soul To Soul |
| 1986 | "Willie The Wimp"/"Superstition" | 19/11 | - | Live Alive |
| 1986 | "Heartache Away"/"Love Roulette" (w/ Don Johnson) | - | - | Heartbeat |
| 1987 | "Pipeline" (w/ Dick Dale)/"Love Struck Baby" | - | - | Back To The Beach Soundtrack |
| 1989 | "The House Is Rockin'"/"Tightrope" | 18/14 | - | In Step |
| 1989 | "Crossfire" | 1 | - | In Step |
| 1989 | "Wall Of Denial" | 46 | - | In Step |
| 1989 | "Tightrope" | 14 | - | In Step |
| 1990 | "Tick Tock/Brothers" (w/ Jimmie Vaughan as the Vaughan Brothers) | 7 | - | Family Style |
| 1990 | "Telephone Song" (w/ Jimmie Vaughan as the Vaughan Brothers) | 3 | - | Family Style |
| 1990 | "Good Texan"/"Baboom/Mama Said" (w/ Jimmie Vaughan as the Vaughan Brothers) | 18 | - | Family Style |
| 1991 | "The Sky Is Crying"/"Chitlins Con Carne" | 2 | - | The Sky Is Crying |
| 1991 | "Empty Arms"/"Wham" | 3 | - | The Sky Is Crying |
| 1991 | "Little Wing" | 26 | - | The Sky Is Crying |
| 1992 | "Shake For Me" | 19 | - | In The Beginning |
| 1995 | "Taxman"/"The House Is Rockin'" | 32 | - | Greatest Hits |

== Video albums ==
| Album | Year | Chart positions | Certifications | |
| Album | Year | US 200 | U.S. | CAN |
|---|---|---|---|---|
| Pride and Joy | 1991 | - | Platinum | - |
| Live at the El Mocambo | 1991 | - | 2× Platinum | - |
| Live from Austin, Texas | 1995 | - | 2× Platinum | - |
| Live at Montreux 1982 & 1985 | 2004 | - | Platinum | - |
| Live in Tokyo | 2006 | - | - | - |

== Music videos ==
| Year | Title | Director | Producer(s) |
|---|---|---|---|
| 1983 | "Love Struck Baby" | Joe Butts | Dale Ward |
| 1984 | "Cold Shot" | D.J. Webster | Julie Kaufman-Webster |
| 1984 | "Couldn't Stand The Weather" | Charlie Rice | Julie Kaufman-Webster |
| 1985 | "Change It" | Josh Aranson | Bob Jason, Gail Kramer |
| 1986 | "Superstition" | Fisher & Preachman | Jon Douglas West |
| 1989 | "The House Is Rockin'" | D.J. Webster | Steven Brandman |
| 1989 | "Crossfire" | D.J. Webster | Nina M. Dluhy |
| 1992 | "Little Wing" | Phil Tucket | — |

== With other artists ==
- (1979) W. C. Clark, Rough Edges
- (1983) David Bowie, Let's Dance
- (1983) Johnny Copeland, Texas Twister – "Don't Stop By the Creek, Son" and "When the Rain Starts Fallin'"
- (1984) Marcia Ball, Soulful Dress – "Soulful Dress"
- (1985) Lonnie Mack, Strike Like Lightning – "Hound Dog Man," "Satisfy Susie," "Double Whammy," "If You Have to Know," and "Oreo Cookie Blues"
- (1985) Roy Head, Living For A Song
- (1985) Bennie Wallace, Twilight Time – "All Night Dance" and "Trouble In Mind"
- (1986) Gung Ho, original soundtrack
- (1986) James Brown, Gravity – "Living in America"
- (1986) Don Johnson, Heartbeat – "Heartache Away" and "Love Roulette"
- (1986) Teena Marie, Emerald City – "You So Heavy"
- (1987) Stevie Wonder, Characters – "Come Let Me Make Your Love Come Down"
- (1987) Jennifer Warnes, Famous Blue Raincoat – "First We Take Manhattan"
- (1987) A.C. Reed, I'm In The Wrong Business – "I Can't Go on This Way," "These Blues Is Killing Me," and "Miami Strut"
- (1988) Brian Slawson, Distant Drums – "Bumble Bee Blues"
- (1988) Bill Carter, Loaded Dice – "Loaded Dice," "Na Na Ne Na Nay," and "Chain of Fools"
- (1989) Zucchero, Zucchero – "Mama" (Madre Dolcissima)
- (1990) Bob Dylan, Under the Red Sky – "10,000 Men," "God Knows," and "Cat's in the Well"
- (1994) Doyle Bramhall, Bird Nest on the Ground – "Too Sorry"
- (1994) The Unplugged Collection, Volume One ("Pride And Joy")
- (1996) Jerry Lynn Williams, The Peacemaker – "Just How You Play the Game"
- (2006) Marc Benno and the Nightcrawlers, Crawlin (Blue Skunk Music)

== Bootleg recordings ==
Stevie Ray Vaughan's bootleg recordings are performances by Vaughan that have attained some level of public circulation without being available as a legal release. The term most often refers to audio recordings, but also includes video performances. Bootleg recordings arise from a multitude of sources, including broadcast performances, recordings of live shows, test discs, privately distributed copies of demos, and copied studio session tapes. From the earliest bootlegs in the early 1970s, performances for television, concerts, and studio outtakes have been extensive sources for Stevie Ray Vaughan bootlegs.

Several websites have been devoted to comprehensively documenting Stevie Ray Vaughan bootlegs; the following is a list for some of the most common or notable bootlegged recordings by Stevie Ray Vaughan.

=== Early bootlegs ===
- Cast of Thousands, 1971. A young Stephen Tobolowsky asked Vaughan to join his band named Cast of Thousands. They recorded two songs, which were included on a compilation album of five Oak Cliff bands, called A New Hi for Tempo II Studios. "Red, White, and Blue" was included on Rough Edges, which is a bootleg album consisting of studio and live material.

=== Live concerts (1983-1990) ===
- El Mocambo, July 11, 1983. Live at the El Mocambo, an official release by Sony in 1991, contained a performance at the El Mocambo in Toronto, professionally filmed and recorded for Canadian television. You'll Be Mine, Little Wing, and Rude Mood were not included on the DVD, though two of the three are available on bootlegged videos. On CD, "Texas Flood" was released on the album Blues at Sunrise, and "Hug You, Squeeze You" was released on the SRV box set, prior to the 2014 release of the complete show as part of "The Complete Epic Recordings Collection".
- Dallas Moonlight, The Duke and the Hawk 1983 Recorded live at the Sound Stage, Las Colinas, Dallas, Texas, 27th April 1983, a double album, 28 tracks (Beech Marten Records – BM 045/2) with David Bowie release in 1991
- Ripley Music Hall, 1983. Stevie Ray Vaughan and Double Trouble performed at Ripley Music Hall in Philadelphia on October 20, 1983. The show was broadcast over radio for the King Biscuit Flower Hour, resulting in bootleg recordings of high quality. The entire recording is available on Wolfgang's Vault.
- Austin Opera House, 1984. A concert at the Austin Opera House on April 15, 1984, was recorded for the King Biscuit Flower Hour. The show featured Vaughan's brother, Jimmie Vaughan, on guitar for "Cold Shot," "The Things That I Used to Do," and "Couldn't Stand the Weather." The recording is available on Wolfgang's Vault. A decent quality audience video of the show is also available.
- Spectrum, 1984. The band performed two shows on August 17, 1984, at the Spectrum in Montreal. Both were broadcast over radio for the King Biscuit Flower Hour, resulting in bootleg recordings of high quality. The recordings are available on Wolfgang's Vault.
- Rockpalast, 1984. Stevie Ray Vaughan and Double Trouble's concert at the Loreley Freilichtbühne on August 25, 1984, was filmed for a German television show, Rockpalast. The program and its audio recording have been bootlegged in various formats. In 2008, the concert became available on ConcertTV, a video on-demand channel that broadcasts live music performances.
- Alabamahalle, 1984. The band's concert at Alabama-Halle in Munich on August 27, 1984, was filmed for a German television show, Live aus dem Alabama. The video has been available to bootleggers, though the film only captures seven songs from the original broadcast.
- Carnegie Hall, 1984. Live at Carnegie Hall, an official release by Epic in 1997, contained selections from Stevie Ray Vaughan and Double Trouble's Carnegie Hall show professionally recorded on October 4, 1984. Two additional songs from the show have been officially released on the SRV box set: "The Sky Is Crying" and "Voodoo Chile (Slight Return)." Both of these songs were not on the 1997 album. An audience recording, containing the eight other songs left off the original album, became available to bootleggers, dubbed "Carnegie Hall Leftovers."
- Sydney Opera House, 1984. The band performed for two nights at the Sydney Opera House in Australia beginning November 5, 1984, with the second night (November 9) being captured by a camcorder on a tripod from the balcony. The second night's concert video was filmed in its entirety, with the exception of a skip in one song.
- Yubin Chokin Hall, 1985. The band performed for three consecutive nights at Yubin Chokin Hall in Tokyo beginning January 23, 1985, with the second night being filmed by Black Box, Inc. for video release. The video was officially released by Quantum Leap in Japan only as Live in Tokyo.
- Alpine Valley, 1990. Notable as Stevie Ray Vaughan's final concert performances before his death, the August 25–26, 1990 shows at Alpine Valley Music Theatre in Wisconsin were taped both on soundboard and portable recorder. The first night's concert was captured by a camcorder, showing fleeting glimpses of the stage. It's a low-quality video with much chatter from fans.

=== Soul to Soul sessions (1985) ===
A large number of studio outtakes for the Soul to Soul album are available on bootlegs, ranging from complete session tapes to selected takes on various bootlegged compilations. Recorded in March through May 1985, the sessions took place at the Dallas Sound Lab in Texas. In total, 59 tracks were included on eight cassette tapes.
