= The Essential Stevie Ray Vaughan and Double Trouble =

Greatest hits album by Stevie Ray Vaughan and Double Trouble
- Released: October 2002
- Recorded: 1980–1990
- Genre: Texas blues; blues rock
- Length: 2:56:21
- Label: Epic
- Producer: Bob Irwin

Stevie Ray Vaughan and Double Trouble chronology
Live at Montreux 1982 & 1985 (2001)	The Essential Stevie Ray Vaughan and Double Trouble (2002)	Martin Scorsese Presents The Blues - Stevie Ray Vaughan (2003)

Professional ratings
Review scores
Source	Rating
Allmusic	4/5 stars
The Penguin Guide to Blues Recordings	+ Crown

The Essential Stevie Ray Vaughan and Double Trouble is a compilation album of recorded material by American singer, songwriter and guitarist Stevie Ray Vaughan and his backing band Double Trouble, released in 2002. The album was released by Epic Records and includes songs from 1980 to 1990 including several live tracks on two discs. In 2008, the album was re-released as part of the Limited Edition 3.0 series, with a third bonus disc containing six additional songs culled from studio albums.

== Track listing ==
- All songs previously released.

=== Disc One ===
1. "Shake for Me" (live) (Willie Dixon) – 3:51 (released on In the Beginning)
2. "Rude Mood/Hide Away" (live) (Vaughan, Freddie King, Sonny Thompson) – 4:58 (released on Live at Montreux 1982 & 1985)
3. "Love Struck Baby" (Vaughan) – 2:22 (released on Texas Flood)
4. "Pride and Joy" (Vaughan) – 3:40 (released on Texas Flood)
5. "Texas Flood" (Larry Davis, Joseph Wade Scott) – 5:21 (released on Texas Flood)
6. "Mary Had a Little Lamb" (Buddy Guy) – 2:47 (released on Texas Flood)
7. "Lenny" (Vaughan) – 4:57 (released on Texas Flood)
8. "Scuttle Buttin’" (Vaughan) – 1:51 (released on Couldn't Stand the Weather)
9. "Couldn't Stand the Weather" (Vaughan) – 4:41 (released on Couldn't Stand the Weather)
10. "The Things (That) I Used To Do" (Eddie Jones) – 4:54 (released on Couldn't Stand the Weather)
11. "Cold Shot" (Michael Kindred, W.C. Clark) – 4:01 (released on Couldn't Stand the Weather)
12. "Tin Pan Alley (a.k.a. Roughest Place in Town)" (Robert Geddins) – 9:12 (released on Couldn't Stand the Weather)
13. "Give Me Back My Wig" (T.R. Taylor) – 4:07 (released on Couldn't Stand the Weather)
14. "Empty Arms" (Vaughan) – 3:29 (released on The Sky Is Crying)
15. "The Sky Is Crying" (Live) (Elmore James, Morris Levy, Clarence Lewis) – 7:20 (released on SRV boxed set)
16. "Voodoo Child (Slight Return)" (Live) (Jimi Hendrix) – 11:53 (released on SRV boxed set)

=== Disc Two ===
1. "Say What!" (Vaughan) – 5:23 (released on Soul to Soul)
2. "Look at Little Sister" (Hank Ballard) – 3:08 (released on Soul to Soul)
3. "Change It" (Doyle Bramhall) – 3:57 (released on Soul to Soul)
4. "Come On (Part III)" (Earl King) – 4:30 (released on Soul to Soul)
5. "Life Without You" (Vaughan) – 4:18 (released on Soul to Soul)
6. "Little Wing" (Jimi Hendrix) – 6:48 (released on The Sky Is Crying)
7. "Willie the Wimp" (live) (Ruth Ellsworth-Carter, B. Carter) – 4:35 (released on Live Alive)
8. "Superstition" (live) (Stevie Wonder) – 4:41 (released on Live Alive)
9. "Leave My Girl Alone" (live) (Buddy Guy) – 4:47 (released on Epic promotional disc ESK 1998 and The Real Deal: Greatest Hits Volume 2)
10. "The House Is Rockin’" (Vaughan, Doyle Bramhall) – 2:24 (released on In Step)
11. "Crossfire" (Carter, Chris Layton, Ellsworth-Carter, Reese Wynans, Tommy Shannon) – 4:10 (released on In Step)
12. "Tightrope" (Vaughan, Doyle Bramhall) – 4:39 (released on In Step)
13. "Wall of Denial" (Vaughan, Doyle Bramhall) – 5:36 (released on In Step)
14. "Riviera Paradise" (Vaughan) – 8:50 (released on In Step)
15. "Telephone Song" (Vaughan, Doyle Bramhall) – 3:28 (released on Family Style)
16. "Long Way from Home" (Vaughan, Doyle Bramhall) – 3:15 (released on Family Style)
17. "Life by the Drop" (Doyle Bramhall, Barbara Logan) – 2:27 (released on The Sky Is Crying)

=== Disc Three ["Limited Edition 3.0" release only] ===
1. "Dirty Pool" (Vaughan) – 5:00 (released on Texas Flood)
2. "I'm Cryin" (Vaughan) – 3:43 (released on Texas Flood)
3. "Honey Bee" (Vaughan) – 2:42 (released on Couldn't Stand the Weather)
4. "Ain't Gone 'N' Give Up On Love" (Vaughan) – 6:07 (released on Soul to Soul)
5. "You'll Be Mine" (Dixon) – 3:45 (released on Soul to Soul)
6. "Scratch-N-Sniff" (Vaughan, Bramhall) – 2:42 (released on In Step)

== Personnel ==
- A complete list of personnel can be found on each previous release.

=== Production for compilation ===
- Bob Irwin – producer
- Vic Anesini – mastering
- Steve Berkowitz – A&R
- John Jackson – project director
- Josh Cheuse – art direction and design
- Stephanie Chernikowski – cover photography, liner photos
- Alan Messer – liner photos
- Don Hunstein – liner photos
- David Gahr – photography
- Robert Matheu – photography
- James Minchin III – photography

== Certifications ==
Region	Certification	Certified units/sales
United Kingdom (BPI)	Silver	60,000^{‡}
^{‡} Sales+streaming figures based on certification alone.
