= Greatest Hits (Stevie Ray Vaughan album) =

Compilation album by Stevie Ray Vaughan

Greatest hits album by Stevie Ray Vaughan and Double Trouble
- Released: November 21, 1995
- Genres: Rock, blues
- Length: 47:31
- Label: Epic
- Producers: Jim Capfer, Jim Gaines, Chris Layton, Richard Mullen, Tommy Shannon, Stevie Ray Vaughan

Stevie Ray Vaughan and Double Trouble chronology
In the Beginning (1992)	Greatest Hits (1995)	Live at Carnegie Hall (1997)

Professional ratings
Review scores
Source	Rating
AllMusic	4.5/5 stars
Christgau's Consumer Guide	A−
Entertainment Weekly	B
The Rolling Stone Album Guide	4/5 stars
The Penguin Guide to Blues Recordings	3/4 stars

Greatest Hits is a compilation album by Stevie Ray Vaughan and Double Trouble released in 1995. It was also released on vinyl in the U.S.

== Track listing ==
1. "Taxman" (George Harrison) – 3:34 (previously unreleased)
2. "Texas Flood" (Larry Davis, Joseph Wade Scott) – 5:22 (from Texas Flood)
3. "The House Is Rockin'" (Stevie Ray Vaughan, Doyle Bramhall) – 2:24 (from In Step)
4. "Pride and Joy" (Vaughan) – 3:40 (from Texas Flood)
5. "Tightrope" (Vaughan, Bramhall) – 4:39 (from In Step)
6. "Little Wing" (Jimi Hendrix) – 6:49 (from The Sky Is Crying)
7. "Crossfire" (Tommy Shannon, Chris Layton, Reese Wynans, Bill Carter, Ruth Ellsworth) – 4:10 (from In Step)
8. "Change It" (Bramhall) – 3:59 (from Soul to Soul)
9. "Cold Shot" (Mike Kindred, Arranged by Stevie Ray Vaughan) – 4:01 (from Couldn't Stand the Weather)
10. "Couldn't Stand the Weather" (Vaughan) – 4:42 (from Couldn't Stand the Weather)
11. "Life Without You" (Vaughan) – 4:16 (from Soul to Soul)

== Charts ==
Chart performance for Greatest Hits
Chart (1995–1996)	Peak position
Australian Albums (ARIA)	62
Canada Top Albums/CDs (RPM)	29
New Zealand Albums (RMNZ)	23
US Billboard 200	52

== Certifications ==
Certifications for Greatest Hits
Region	Certification	Certified units/sales
New Zealand (RMNZ)	Gold	7,500^{^}
United States (RIAA)	2× Platinum	2,000,000^{^}
^{^} Shipments figures based on certification alone.
