= Live at Montreux 1982 & 1985 =

Live album by Stevie Ray Vaughan and Double Trouble
- Released: November 20, 2001
- Recorded: July 17, 1982 and July 15, 1985
- Venue: Montreux Casino (Montreux, Switzerland)
- Genre: Electric blues, blues rock, jazz
- Length: 118:11
- Label: Epic
- Producer: Stevie Ray Vaughan

Stevie Ray Vaughan and Double Trouble chronology
SRV (2000)	Live at Montreux 1982 & 1985 (2001)	The Essential Stevie Ray Vaughan and Double Trouble (2002)

Live at Montreux 1982 & 1985 is the fourth live album of American blues musician Stevie Ray Vaughan and his band Double Trouble, recorded at the Montreux Jazz Festival on July 17, 1982 (Disc 1) and July 15, 1985 (Disc 2), and released November 20, 2001 on Epic Records. Neither are complete concerts.

== Track listing ==
Disc One – July 17, 1982

1. "Hide Away" (Freddie King) – 3:19
2. "Rude Mood" (Stevie Ray Vaughan) – 4:54
3. "Pride and Joy" (Vaughan) – 4:01
4. "Texas Flood" (Larry Davis, Joseph Wade Scott) – 10:27
5. "Love Struck Baby" (Vaughan) – 2:53
6. "Dirty Pool" (Doyle Bramhall, Vaughan) – 8:17
7. "Give Me Back My Wig" (Theodore Taylor) – 3:30
8. "Collins Shuffle" (Albert Collins) – 4:51

Disc Two – July 15, 1985

1. "Scuttle Buttin'" (Vaughan) – 3:02
2. "Say What!" (Vaughan) – 4:45
3. "Ain't Gone n' Give Up on Love" (Vaughan) – 6:24
4. "Pride and Joy" (Vaughan) – 5:10
5. "Mary Had a Little Lamb" (Buddy Guy) – 4:27
6. "Tin Pan Alley (aka Roughest Place in Town) (with Johnny Copeland)" (Robert Geddins) – 13:18
7. "Voodoo Child (Slight Return)" (Jimi Hendrix) – 10:51
8. "Texas Flood" (Larry Davis, Joseph Wade Scott) – 7:37
9. "Life Without You" (Vaughan) – 9:03
10. "Gone Home" (Eddie Harris) – 3:53
11. "Couldn't Stand the Weather" (Vaughan) – 7:29

== Background ==
In early 1982, Double Trouble played a show at the Continental Club in Austin, TX. Impressed by the show, legendary producer Jerry Wexler recommended the band play the Montreux Jazz Festival in Switzerland. Booked to play at Montreux International Festival XVI on July 17, 1982, the band's appearance marked the first time an unsigned act would appear at the prestigious event. Booked on an acoustic night, Double Trouble's performance was met by boos. Vaughan's high volume electric blues was not popular with the European crowd, who preferred a quieter, folk blues style.

However, the first Montreux trip was not a bust. In a last-ditch effort to save the trip, the band's manager, Chelsey Millikin, booked the band to play the casino's after hours bar for two nights running. On the first night, Vaughan was approached by David Bowie, who had seen the Montreux performance, and was interested in having Vaughan play on one of his albums. This would lead to Vaughan's guitar work on Bowie's album, Let's Dance. On the second night, Millikin introduced Vaughan to Jackson Browne, who was impressed by the band's sound. Browne and his band joined Double Trouble on stage, where they jammed until seven the next morning. Browne was so moved by Double Trouble's music, he offered them use of his private recording studio, free of charge. Vaughan and Double Trouble would take Browne up on his offer, and the ensuing recordings would become Texas Flood, which would bring the band into the national spotlight.

Vaughan and Double Trouble returned to the Montreux Jazz Festival on July 15, 1985 as headliners, and this time were well received by the audience.

== DVD release ==
A DVD of the Montreux performances was released on September 14, 2004. The DVD version includes the same set-lists as the album, with two extra Johnny Copeland featured songs ("Cold Shot" and "Look at Little Sister") on the 1985 disc. The 1982 disc includes a documentary of the Montreux performances entitled Success in Disguise.

== Personnel ==
=== Musicians ===
- Stevie Ray Vaughan – guitar and vocals
- Chris Layton – drums
- Tommy Shannon – bass
- Reese Wynans – organ
- Johnny Copeland – guitar and vocals

=== Production ===
- Michael B Borofsky – DVD Producer
- Vic Anesini – Mastering
- Chris Theis – Mixing
- Andy Manganello – Mixing
- Steve Berkowitz – Legacy A&R
- John Jackson – Project Direction
- Patti Matheny – A&R Coordination
- Darren Salmieri – A&R Coordination
- Josh Cheuse – Art Direction
- Angela Skouras – Design
- Breanda McManus – Design Assistance
- Noel Wiggins – Design Assistance
- Darryl Pitt – Cover Photography & Liner Photography
- Don Opperman – Liner Photography
- John Christiana – Packaging Manager

== Charts ==
Chart (2001)	Peak position
US Billboard 200	178
