= Live from Austin, Texas (Stevie Ray Vaughan video) =

Video by Stevie Ray Vaughan
- Released: October 31, 1995
- Recorded: Austin City Limits; Austin, Texas; December 13, 1983; October 10, 1989
- Genre: Blues
- Length: 63 minutes
- Label: Sony
- Director: Gary Menotti
- Producer: Bill Arhos, Terry Lickona

Stevie Ray Vaughan chronology
Live at the El Mocambo (1991)	Live from Austin, Texas (1995)	A Tribute to Stevie Ray Vaughan (1996)

Live from Austin, Texas is a live video by Stevie Ray Vaughan and Double Trouble. It is a retrospective of the band's two performances on Austin City Limits in 1983 and 1989. The film was released as a DVD on September 3, 1997.

== Track listing ==
Tracks 1–3 were recorded on December 13, 1983. Tracks 4–9 recorded October 10, 1989.

1. "Pride and Joy" (Stevie Ray Vaughan)
2. "Texas Flood" (Larry Davis, Joseph Wade Scott)
3. "Voodoo Child (Slight Return)" (Jimi Hendrix)
4. "The House Is Rockin'" (Doyle Bramhall, Stevie Ray Vaughan)
5. "Tightrope" (Doyle Bramhall, Stevie Ray Vaughan)
6. "Leave My Girl Alone" (Buddy Guy)
7. "Cold Shot" (W. C. Clark, Michael Kindred)
8. "Crossfire" (Bill Carter, Ruth Ellsworth, Chris Layton, Tommy Shannon, Reese Wynans)
9. "Riviera Paradise" (Stevie Ray Vaughan)
10. "Tick Tock" (Jerry Lynn Williams, Jimmie Vaughan, Nile Rodgers)
11. "Little Wing" [music video] (Jimi Hendrix)
