= Blues at Sunrise (Stevie Ray Vaughan album) =

Compilation album by Stevie Ray Vaughan and Double Trouble
- Released: April 4, 2000
- Genre: Blues
- Length: 70:22

Stevie Ray Vaughan chronology
The Real Deal: Greatest Hits Volume 2 (1999)	Blues at Sunrise (2000)	The Essential Stevie Ray Vaughan and Double Trouble (2002)

Blues at Sunrise is an album by Stevie Ray Vaughan and Double Trouble, released on April 4, 2000. Released a decade after his death, the album is essentially a greatest hits collection, with two previously unreleased songs from Vaughan.

== Critical reception ==
Professional ratings
Review scores
Source	Rating
AllMusic	3/5 stars
The Austin Chronicle	3 stars
The Penguin Guide to Blues Recordings	3/4 stars

Stephen Thomas Erlewine of AllMusic concludes his review with, "Blues at Sunrise is strong and entertaining, working quite well as a mood piece. It may not be revelatory, but if you strip away your qualms and quibbles, it's enjoyable."

Jim Caligiuri of The Austin Chronicle gives this album 3 stars and writes, "While the concept of Blues at Sunrise is appealing and the music is top-notch, any novice SRV fans would be better served approaching his music from one of his original releases."

== Track listing ==
No.	Title	Writer(s)	Length
1.	"Ain't Gone 'N' Give Up On Love"	Stevie Ray Vaughan	6:08
2.	"Leave My Girl Alone"	Buddy Guy	4:13
3.	"Tin Pan Alley (AKA Roughest Place in Town)" (with Johnny Copeland)	Robert Geddins	11:26
4.	"Chitlins con Carne"	Kenny Burrell	3:55
5.	"The Things That I Used to Do"	Eddie Jones	4:54
6.	"The Sky Is Crying"	Elmore James; Morris Levy; Clarence Lewis	4:08
7.	"Texas Flood"	Larry Davis; Joseph Scott	9:43
8.	"May I Have a Talk with You"	Chester Burnett	5:49
9.	"Dirty Pool"	Doyle Bramhall; Stevie Ray Vaughan	5:00
10.	"Blues at Sunrise" (with Albert King)	Albert King	15:06
Total length:			70:22

- Track information and credits adapted from the album's liner notes.
