= Chris Layton =

American drummer (born 1955)

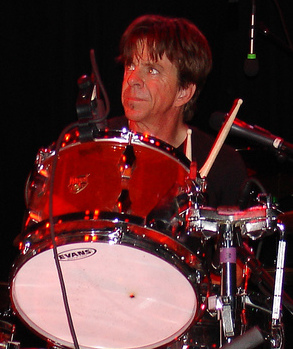
- Layton performing in 2005

Background information
- Born: Christopher Layton; November 16, 1955 (age 70); Mathis, Texas, U.S.
- Genres: Blues rock, Texas blues
- Occupation: Musician
- Instrument: Drums
- Years active: 1978–present
- Labels: Epic, Legacy, Sony, Geffen, Atlantic
- Member of: Kenny Wayne Shepherd Band, Double Trouble

Christopher Layton (born November 16, 1955), is an American drummer who rose to fame as one of the founding members of Double Trouble, a blues rock band led by Stevie Ray Vaughan.

Born and raised in Corpus Christi, Texas, Layton moved to Austin in 1975 and joined the band Greezy Wheels. He later joined Vaughan's band Double Trouble in 1978. After forming successful partnerships with bandmates Tommy Shannon and Reese Wynans, Double Trouble recorded and performed with Vaughan until his death in 1990. Layton and Shannon later formed supergroups such as the Arc Angels, Storyville, and Grady. Layton is the drummer for the Kenny Wayne Shepherd Band.

== Early life and career ==
Layton was born in Corpus Christi, Texas. During his childhood, he lived in Mathis, Texas, a small community where his father owned a car dealership. After hearing Chubby Checker's version of "The Twist", Layton became fascinated with playing the drums. He moved back to Corpus Christi and acquired his first drum set at the age of 13. Layton graduated from W. B. Ray High School, where he was part of the school band. After attending Del Mar College in Corpus Christi, Layton moved to Austin on December 18, 1975, joining the band Greezy Wheels.

== Double Trouble and later career ==
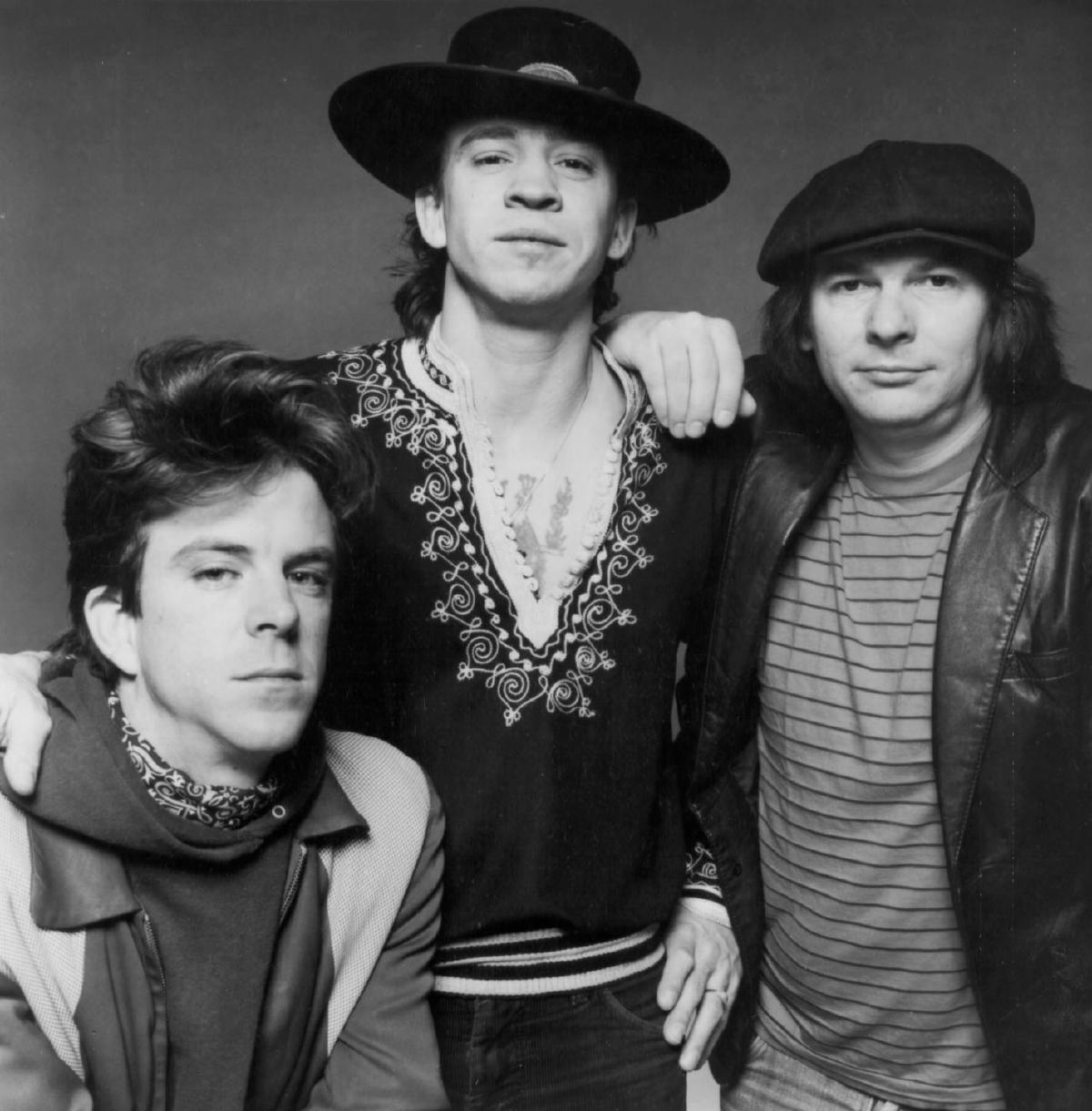
Stevie Ray Vaughan and Double Trouble (Layton to the left) in 1983

Layton's roommate, sax player Joe Sublett, recalls how Layton met Stevie Ray Vaughan:

After Stevie said he needed a drummer, I had been playing a lot of Texas blues and Chicago blues records for Chris. We had figured out a way to get the headphones from the living room to the back room where Chris had his drums set up. He was playing along with these records, and Stevie walked in the house and Chris had the headphones on. He tapped Chris on the shoulder and said, 'I'll give you a try if you'll play what I want' – something to that effect.
Chris was a great student and learned to play that stuff really well and quickly. It was a situation where if Stevie wanted him to play a certain way, he'd sit down and show him.

On September 10, 1978, Layton joined Vaughan in Double Trouble, taking the name from a song by Otis Rush. After Tommy Shannon replaced Newhouse in 1981, Double Trouble performed at the Montreux Jazz Festival in July 1982, where its performance caught the attention of Jackson Browne. The band's debut album, Texas Flood (1983), was recorded in Browne's studio and became a commercial success. The album was produced by John H. Hammond and sold more than half a million copies by the end of the year.

Layton would continue to record and perform with Vaughan and Double Trouble until Vaughan's death on August 27, 1990. He said of Vaughan's death: "Stevie meant everything to me musically. His death was the worst thing that ever happened to me." Layton and Shannon went on to form the Arc Angels in 1990, with guitarists Doyle Bramhall II and Charlie Sexton. In 1994, they formed Storyville with David Lee Holt, David Grissom, and singer Malford Milligan. Layton and Shannon played on the 1994 album Something Inside of Me by Little Jimmy King. Layton appeared with Shannon in a tribute to Vaughan broadcast on Austin City Limits in 1995. Layton and Shannon also released their first solo album, Been a Long Time (2001), and featured many special guests such as Dr. John and Willie Nelson. In 2003, Layton formed Grady with leader Gordie (Grady) Johnson, and has worked with many other artists including Jonny Lang, Kenny Wayne Shepherd, Eric Johnson, and Susan Tedeschi.

Layton is a longtime user of Ludwig drums, Zildjian cymbals and Vater drumsticks.

== Discography ==
=== Stevie Ray Vaughan and Double Trouble ===
- Texas Flood (1983)
- Couldn't Stand the Weather (1984)
- Soul to Soul (1985)
- Live Alive (1986)
- In Step (1989)
- The Sky Is Crying (1991)
- In the Beginning (1992)
- Greatest Hits (1995)
- A Tribute to Stevie Ray Vaughan (1996)
- Live at Carnegie Hall (1997)
- The Real Deal: Greatest Hits Volume 2 (1999)
- Blues at Sunrise (2000)
- SRV: Box Set (2000)
- Live at Montreux 1982 & 1985 (2001)
- The Essential Stevie Ray Vaughan and Double Trouble (2002)
- Martin Scorsese Presents the Blues: Stevie Ray Vaughan (2003)
- The Real Deal: Greatest Hits Volume 1 (2006)
- Solos, Sessions & Encores (2007)
- Couldn't Stand the Weather (Legacy Edition) (2010)
- Texas Flood (Legacy Edition) (2013)

=== Arc Angels ===
- Arc Angels (Geffen, 1992)
- Living in a Dream (2009)

=== Storyville ===
- Bluest Eyes (November Records, 1994)
- A Piece of Your Soul (Atlantic, 1996)
- Dog Years (Atlantic, 1998)
- Live at Antone's (2007)
