= The Real Deal: Greatest Hits Volume 2 =

The Real Deal: Greatest Hits, Volume 2

Greatest hits album by Stevie Ray Vaughan
- Released: 1999
- Recorded: 1980–1990
- Genre: Blues rock
- Length: 71:34
- Label: Epic
- Producer: Bob Irwin

Stevie Ray Vaughan chronology
Live at Carnegie Hall (1997)	The Real Deal: Greatest Hits, Volume 2 (1999)	Blues at Sunrise (2000)

Professional ratings
Review scores
Source	Rating
Allmusic	4/5 stars
The Penguin Guide to Blues Recordings	3/4 stars

The Real Deal: Greatest Hits, Volume 2 is a compilation album of material by Stevie Ray Vaughan in 1999 (see 1999 in music). The album was released by Epic Records and includes material from the five studio albums he released with Double Trouble as well as live material and collaborations with brother Jimmie and surf guitarist Dick Dale.

== Track listing ==
1. "Love Struck Baby" (Vaughan) – 2:22
  - from Texas Flood
2. "Ain't Gone 'N' Give Up on Love" (Vaughan) – 6:06
  - from Soul to Soul
3. "Scuttle Buttin'" (Vaughan) – 1:51
  - from Couldn't Stand the Weather
4. "Wall of Denial" (Doyle Bramhall, Vaughan) – 5:36
  - from In Step
5. "Lenny" (Vaughan) – 4:57
  - from Texas Flood
6. "Superstition" (live) (Stevie Wonder) – 4:41
  - from Live Alive
7. "Empty Arms" (Vaughan) – 3:29
  - from The Sky Is Crying
8. "Riviera Paradise" (Vaughan) – 8:50
  - from In Step
9. "Look At Little Sister" (Hank Ballard) – 3:08
  - from Soul to Soul
10. "Willie the Wimp" (live) (Bill Carter, Ruth Ellsworth) – 4:35
  - from Live Alive
11. "Pipeline" (Brian Carman, Bob Spickard) – 3:01
  - with Dick Dale, from Back to the Beach Soundtrack
12. "Shake for Me" (live) (Willie Dixon) – 3:51
  - from In the Beginning
13. "Leave My Girl Alone" (Live at Austin City Limits, 10/10/89) (Buddy Guy) – 4:47
  - first commercial release; studio version from In Step
14. "Telephone Song" (Bramhall, Vaughan) – 3:28
  - with Jimmie Vaughan, from Family Style
15. "Voodoo Child (Slight Return)" (Jimi Hendrix) – 8:00
  - from Couldn't Stand the Weather
16. "Life By the Drop" (Bramhall, Barbara Logan) – 2:27
  - from The Sky Is Crying

== Personnel ==
- A complete list of personnel can be found on each previous release.

=== Production for compilation ===
- Bob Irwin – producer
- Vic Anesini – mastering
- Scott Jordan – liner notes
- Robert Matheu – photography

== Charts ==
Chart (1997)	Peak position
US Billboard 200	52

Chart (2007)	Peak position
New Zealand Albums (RMNZ)	27

== Certifications ==
Region	Certification	Certified units/sales
United States (RIAA)	Gold	500,000^{^}
^{^} Shipments figures based on certification alone.
