= The Sky Is Crying =

The Sky Is Crying may refer to:

- "The Sky Is Crying" (song), a blues song by Elmore James recorded by many artists
- The Sky Is Crying (album), a 1991 album by Stevie Ray Vaughan and Double Trouble
- The Sky Is Crying, a 2014 album by Erja Lyytinen
