= Live at the El Mocambo (Stevie Ray Vaughan video) =

Video by Stevie Ray Vaughan
- Released: November 26, 1991
- Recorded: El Mocambo; Toronto, Ontario, Canada; July 20, 1983
- Genre: Blues
- Length: 63 minutes
- Label: Sony
- Director: Dennis Saunders
- Producer: John Martin

Stevie Ray Vaughan chronology
Pride and Joy (1990)	Live at the El Mocambo (1991)	Live from Austin, Texas (1995)

Live at the El Mocambo is a live video by Stevie Ray Vaughan and Double Trouble. The film was recorded at El Mocambo club in Toronto, Ontario on July 20, 1983, during the band's Texas Flood Tour. It was also released as a DVD on December 21, 1999, with interviews from drummer Chris Layton and bassist Tommy Shannon.

The performance was later released in 2014 on the album The Complete Epic Recordings Collection (Live) with two bonus tracks, Howlin Wolf's "You'll Be Mine" and Vaughan's own "Rude Mood".

== Critical reception ==
The DVD release of Live at the El Mocambo received positive acclaim, particularly for its musical value and historical significance.

Contemporary critics lauded the concert as an exceptional documentation of Stevie Ray Vaughan and Double Trouble's live performance, highlighting a setlist that featured the band's major hits. The release was praised for capturing a nostalgic, intimate club atmosphere akin to "home rock concerts." Reviewers noted that the visual presentation successfully isolated the performing artists from the background, effectively focusing the audience's full attention on the band.

From a technical standpoint, the release offered two distinct audio options: a multi-channel Dolby Digital mix and a standard PCM audio track. Critics observed that the multi-channel option provided a broader soundstage, though they advised listeners seeking a more authentic reproduction of the original venue's acoustic environment to opt for the stereo format. The image quality, while restricted by indoor venue conditions poorly suited for professional filming, was deemed acceptable, especially considering the lack of visual distortion from the stage lights. Additionally, the inclusion of bonus materials—such as synchronized lyrics in subtitles, musician discographies, and a comprehensive band history—was well-received by reviewers.

== Track listing ==
1. "Testify" (Isley Brothers) - 3:34
2. "So Excited" (S.R. Vaughan) - 4:05
3. "Voodoo Child (Slight Return)" (Jimi Hendrix) - 6:39
4. "Pride and Joy" (S.R. Vaughan) - 4:36
5. "Tell Me" (Chester Arthur Burnett) - 3:08
6. "Mary Had a Little Lamb" (George 'Buddy' Guy) - 3:15
7. "Texas Flood" (Larry Davis / Joseph Wade Scott) - 9:30
8. "Love Struck Baby" (S.R. Vaughan) - 2:51
9. "Hug You, Squeeze You" (John Lee Hooker) - 3:44
10. "Third Stone from the Sun" (Jimi Hendrix) - 6:10
11. "Lenny" (S.R. Vaughan) - 8:36
12. "Wham" (Lonnie Mack) - 3:47

== Certifications ==
Region	Certification	Certified units/sales
France (SNEP)	Gold	10,000^{*}
United States (RIAA)	2× Platinum	200,000^{^}
^{*} Sales figures based on certification alone.^{^} Shipments figures based on certification alone.
