= Live at Carnegie Hall (Stevie Ray Vaughan album) =

Live album by Stevie Ray Vaughan and Double Trouble
- Released: July 29, 1997
- Recorded: October 4, 1984
- Venues: Carnegie Hall (New York City)
- Genres: Texas blues; blues rock; electric blues
- Length: 61:28
- Label: Epic
- Producers: Stevie Ray Vaughan, Tony Martell (exec.)

Stevie Ray Vaughan and Double Trouble chronology
Greatest Hits (1995)	Live at Carnegie Hall (1997)	The Real Deal: Greatest Hits Volume 2 (1999)

Singles from Live at Carnegie Hall
- 1. "Dirty Pool" Released: July 29, 1997

Live at Carnegie Hall is the third live album by American blues rock band Stevie Ray Vaughan and Double Trouble, released by Epic Records in July 1997. The album consists of live selections from their sold-out October 4, 1984, benefit concert at Carnegie Hall for the T.J. Martell Foundation. Backed by a ten-piece big band for the second half of the event, Vaughan had celebrated his thirtieth birthday the night before, and called the concert his "best birthday ever, forever". The band's double-set performance, which included several blues and R&B standards, was highly successful, receiving mostly positive reviews from music critics.

Initially ranked as the top blues album of 1997, Live at Carnegie Hall peaked at number 40 on the Billboard 200, where it spent twelve weeks on the chart. The album was ultimately certified gold by the Recording Industry Association of America (RIAA) after selling over half a million units. Guests on the album include Vaughan's brother Jimmie Vaughan (guitar), Dr. John (keyboards), George Rains (drums) and the Roomful of Blues horn section, along with vocalist Angela Strehli. Related to the album, two outtakes from the concert were released on the SRV box set in November 2000.

== Reception ==
Professional ratings
Review scores
Source	Rating
The Penguin Guide to Blues Recordings	4/4 stars

The album charted at #40 on the Billboard 200, and was the #1 blues album for eight weeks. Thom Owens of Allmusic gave the album a rating of 4/5, stating there might have been "more musicians than usual on-stage, but Stevie Ray remains the center of attention...It's the best live Stevie Ray record released." Entertainment Weekly said that his "blistering fretwork is so technically formidable that it should awe even the most unflappable aficionados." Stephen Holden from The New York Times described the concert itself as "a stomping roadhouse."

== Track listing ==
All songs were written by Stevie Ray Vaughan, except where noted.

1. Intro - Ken Dashow / John Hammond – 2:09
2. "Scuttle Buttin'" (instrumental) – 2:43
3. "Testify" (instrumental) (Ronald Isley, O'Kelly Isley Jr., Rudolph Isley) – 5:20
4. "Love Struck Baby" – 3:05
5. "Honey Bee" – 3:05
6. "Cold Shot" (Mike Kindred, W. C. Clark) – 4:45
7. "Letter to My Girlfriend" (Eddie Jones) – 3:08
8. "Dirty Pool" (Doyle Bramhall, Vaughan) – 6:40
9. "Pride and Joy" – 4:48
10. "The Things That I Used to Do" (Jones) – 5:26
11. "C.O.D." (Leo Gooden) – 5:32
12. "Iced Over" (AKA "Collins' Shuffle") (instrumental) (Gwen Collins/Stevie Ray Vaughan) – 5:11
13. "Lenny" (instrumental) – 7:14
14. "Rude Mood" (instrumental) – 2:22

== Personnel ==
- Stevie Ray Vaughan – guitar, vocals
- Chris Layton – drums
- Tommy Shannon – bass

=== Special guests ===
- Jimmie Vaughan – guitar
- Dr. John – organ, piano
- George Rains – drums
- Bob Enos – trumpet
- Porky Cohen – trombone
- Rich Lataille – alto saxophone
- Greg Piccolo – tenor saxophone
- Doug James – baritone saxophone
- Angela Strehli – vocals on "C.O.D."

=== Production ===
- Stevie Ray Vaughan – producer
- Tony Martell – executive producer
- Richard Mullen – engineer
- Jeff Powell – mixer
- Kevin Nix – digital editing
- Bob Ludwig – mastering
- Brian Lee – mastering
- Josh Cheuse – art direction
- Chuck Pulin – photography

== Charts ==
Chart (1997)	Peak position
Canada Top Albums/CDs (RPM)	75
Dutch Albums (Album Top 100)	31
Finnish Albums (Suomen virallinen lista)	33
US Billboard 200	40

== Certifications ==
Region	Certification	Certified units/sales
United States (RIAA)	Gold	500,000^{^}
^{^} Shipments figures based on certification alone.
