= Nuno Mindelis =

Nuno Mindelis (born August 7, 1957, in Cabinda, Angola), nicknamed "The Beast from Brazil", is an Angolan-born Brazilian blues guitarist and singer-songwriter.

Most of his recorded work has been sung in English; however, he recorded his 2006 album Outros Nunos in Portuguese, his native language. He has recorded two albums with the band Double Trouble. Mindelis counts Otis Redding and Johnny Winter among his musical influences.

== Life and career ==
Mindelis became a guitar enthusiast at the age of five. By the age of nine he began building and playing self-made guitars. A primary influence at that time was Otis Redding and his rhythm section, Booker T. & the MG's.

In 1990, an independent recording he had made began to receive airplay on local radio stations. In 1991, he recorded his debut solo album, Blues & Derivados, which received positive reviews in Brazilian media. In 1992, he recorded his second solo album, Long Distance Blues for Movieplay Records. In this album Mindelis was joined by Larry McCray, and the French harmonica player, J.J. Milteau. As part of his promotional tour for the album, Mindelis played at a blues festival in São Paulo, featuring Robert Cray, Otis Clay, Ronnie Earl, Lonnie Brooks and Bo Diddley.

In 1994, Guitar Player magazine profiled Mindelis. Further recognition came in their May 1998 issue, as Mindelis was selected as "Best Blues Guitarist" in the 30th Anniversary Guitar Player competition. In 1995, Mindelis played at Antone's 20th Anniversary in Austin, Texas, opening for Guy Forsite and Junior Wells others. Clarence "Gatemouth" Brown and Storyville also performed at the event.

Later that year, Mindelis recorded his album Texas Bound, featuring Tommy Shannon and Chris Layton, of Stevie Ray Vaughan's rhythm section, Double Trouble. Texas Bound was the 12th best selling album seller in Benelux.

In 1999, Mindelis released Blues on the Outside also featuring Double Trouble. Mindelis appeared at the 25th edition of the Montreal International Jazz Festival in 2001, and did other presentations in Quebec, Ottawa. Mindelis played at the festival again in 2004, after the release of his album Twelve Hours, and again played Quebec and Ottawa, and also the Montremblant Blues Festival, sharing the stages with Keb' Mo' and Jimmie Vaughan. Andy Grieg in Canada's Real Blues magazine asked, "Is the new King of the blues a man based in Brazil?"

In 2005, Mindelis recorded the album, Outros Nunos, dedicated to Brazil, with all of the songs sung in Portuguese and including versions of Brazilian music standards.

In 2010, he released Free Blues, entirely produced and played by himself. The idea was to re-create blues and rock classics that so much influenced him in his adolescence times under a new approach, with the help of electronics and new elements, such as rap and other more contemporary effects. In 2013, the album Angels & Clowns was released by Duke Robillard's / Finkelstein's label Duchess Blue / Shining Stone, produced by Duke Robillard who also played in the record.

In 2014, he again performed at the Montreal International Jazz Festival, followed by a tour in several cities of Quebec.

In 2018, Mindelis recorded his first live album during the Suwalki Blues Festival in Poland, where he was a headliner alongside Eric Burdon & The Animals, Billy Gibbons, Mavis Staples. Mindelis is now in the Suwalki Festival's Walk of Fame.

In 2020, was the gradual release of the album, Angola Blues, a tribute to the country where he was born and lived until he was 17 years old, Angola. The first single "Cabinda" came out on January 24 on all streaming platforms, with the second and third following in subsequent months before the full album was issued in April 2020.

== Discography ==
- Blues e Derivados (1989)
- Long Distance Blues (1992)
- Texas Bound (1996) (feat. Double Trouble former SRV Rhythm Section Chris Layton Drums – Tommy Shannon / Bass – Lou Ann Barton / Backing Vocals)
- Nuno Mindelis & the Cream Crackers (1998) (a reissue of Long Distance Blues with a different title without the knowledge / approval of the author)
- Blues on the Outside (1999) (feat. Double Trouble former SRV Rhythm Section)
- Twelve Hours (2003)
- Outros Nunos (2005)
- Free Blues (2010)
- Angels & Clowns (Feat. The Duke Robillard Band) (2013)
- Live At The Suwalki Festival / Poland (2018)
- "Cabinda" (single) (2020)
- Angola Blues (2020)
