= Blues at Sunrise =

Blues at Sunrise may refer to:

- Blues at Sunrise (Albert King album)
- Blues at Sunrise (Stevie Ray Vaughan album)
