= Live at the El Mocambo =

Live at the El Mocambo may refer to:

- Live at the El Mocambo (Elvis Costello album), 1993
- Live at the El Mocambo (April Wine album), 1977
- Live at the El Mocambo (Stevie Ray Vaughan video), 1991
- El Mocambo 1977, by the Rolling Stones, also referred to as Live at the El Mocambo, 2022

== See also ==
- El Mocambo § Live recordings
