= Live in Tokyo (Stevie Ray Vaughan album) =

Live In Tokyo

Live album by Stevie Ray Vaughan and Double Trouble
- Released: July 11, 2006
- Recorded: January 24, 1985
- Genre: Electric blues
- Label: Masterplan Records

Live In Tokyo is the fifth live album by Stevie Ray Vaughan and Double Trouble at Shiba Yubinchokin Hall, Tokyo, on January 24, 1985. The concert was part of a 5-day tour of Japan to support their recently released album, Couldn't Stand the Weather.

== DVD release ==
Multiple video recordings of the January 24th concert of the tour have been released., but the official DVD was released on January 27, 2007 by Quantum Leap Studios. The concert was originally released in 1985 on a Pioneer Laser Disc by Black Box, Inc. It included the encore "Testify/Third Stone From the Sun" and was 86 minutes long.

== Track listing ==
All tracks written by Stevie Ray Vaughan except where noted.

1. "Scuttle Buttin'" – 2:58
2. "Say What!" – 4:50
3. "Voodoo Child (Slight Return)" (Jimi Hendrix) – 15:25
4. "Cold Shot" (M. Kindred, W.C. Clark) – 4:40
5. "Couldn't Stand The Weather" – 5:52
6. "Tin Pan Alley" (Bob Geddins) – 13:08
7. "Mary Had A Little Lamb" (Buddy Guy) – 3:31
8. "Love Struck Baby" – 3:19
9. "Texas Flood" (Larry Davis, J.W. Scott) – 11:36
10. "Lenny" – 12:18
