= Couldn't Stand the Weather =

Studio album by Stevie Ray Vaughan and Double Trouble
- Released: May 15, 1984
- Recorded: January 1984
- Studios: Power Station, New York City
- Genres: Texas blues; blues rock
- Length: 38:08
- Label: Epic
- Producers: Stevie Ray Vaughan; Double Trouble; Richard Mullen; Jim Capfer

Stevie Ray Vaughan and Double Trouble chronology
Texas Flood (1983)	Couldn't Stand the Weather (1984)	Soul to Soul (1985)

Singles from Couldn't Stand the Weather
- 1. "Voodoo Child (Slight Return)" Released: 1984; 2. "Cold Shot" Released: 1984; 3. "Couldn't Stand the Weather" Released: 1984

Couldn't Stand the Weather is the second studio album by American blues rock band Stevie Ray Vaughan and Double Trouble. It was released on May 15, 1984, by Epic Records as the follow-up to the band's critically and commercially successful 1983 album, Texas Flood. Recording sessions took place in January 1984 at the Power Station in New York City.

Stevie Ray Vaughan wrote half the tracks on Couldn't Stand the Weather. The album reached No. 31 on the Billboard 200 chart and the music video for "Couldn't Stand the Weather" received regular rotation on MTV. The album received mostly positive reviews, with AllMusic giving it a four out of five stars. It received praise for Vaughan’s playing and highlighted songs such as "Voodoo Child" and "Tin Pan Alley", but received criticism for the lack of original songs.

In 1999, a reissue of the album was released which contains an audio interview segment and four studio outtakes. In 2010, the album was reissued as a Legacy Edition containing two CDs with a previously unreleased studio outtake and selections from an August 17, 1984, concert at The Spectrum in Montreal, Canada, originally recorded for the King Biscuit Flower Hour radio program.

== Recording and production ==
During January 1984, Vaughan and Double Trouble spent 19 days at the Power Station recording studio in New York City. John Hammond was executive producer and supervised the sessions. The album was produced by the band along with Richard Mullen and Jim Capfer. The album was engineered by Mullen and Rob Eaton. Graphic artist Holland MacDonald designed the album cover art with assistance from Shostal Associates for the tornado image, a photograph of the 1957 Fargo tornado.

== Reception ==
Professional ratings
Review scores
Source	Rating
AllMusic	4/5 stars
Christgau's Record Guide	B+
The Encyclopedia of Popular Music	4/5 stars
Entertainment Weekly	B+
The Great Rock Discography	6/10
MusicHound Rock	4/5 stars
The Penguin Guide to Blues Recordings	4/4 stars
The Rolling Stone Album Guide	3.5/5 stars
DownBeat	4/5 stars

The album was another commercial success for Stevie Ray Vaughan, selling 1,000,000 copies within five weeks. In a retrospective review, Stephen Thomas Erlewine of Allmusic wrote:

Stevie Ray Vaughan's second album, Couldn't Stand the Weather, pretty much did everything a second album should do: it confirmed that the acclaimed debut was no fluke, while matching, if not bettering, the sales of its predecessor, thereby cementing Vaughan's status as a giant of modern blues ... [However,] Vaughan didn't really push himself as hard as he could have, and the feeling that if he had, he would have come up with something a bit stronger.

Robert Christgau wrote in his review that "Though he comes close sometimes, this Texan ain't Hendrix. But between earned Jimi cover and lyric refreshment, album two is almost everything a reasonable person might hope from him: a roadhouse album with gargantuan sonic imagination."

Frank-John Hadley gave the 2010 reissue 4 stars in DownBeat. He wrote, "The package now has a second disc that debuts a torrid set with his Double Trouble band at Montreal’s Spectrum the same year. In studio and onstage, he morphs pitch-bending into a visceral art form".

== Track listings ==
=== Original release ===
Details are taken from the 1984 Epic Records album liner notes; reissues show several different songwriter credits.

Side 1
No.	Title	Writer(s)	Length
1.	"Scuttle Buttin'"	Stevie Ray Vaughan	1:49
2.	"Couldn't Stand the Weather"	Vaughan	4:40
3.	"The Things (That) I Used to Do"	Eddie Jones a.k.a. Guitar Slim	4:53
4.	"Voodoo Child (Slight Return)"	Jimi Hendrix	7:58

Side 2
No.	Title	Writer(s)	Length
1.	"Cold Shot"	K. Kendrid, arr. Vaughan	3:57
2.	"Tin Pan Alley"	Robert Geddins	9:10
3.	"Honey Bee"	Vaughan	2:40
4.	"Stang's Swang"	Vaughan	2:41

=== 1999 reissue bonus tracks ===
No.	Title	Writer(s)	Length
9.	"SRV Speaks"		1:08
10.	"Hide Away"	Freddie King, Sonny Thompson	4:04
11.	"Look at Little Sister"	Hank Ballard	2:46
12.	"Give Me Back My Wig"	T. R. Taylor a.k.a. Hound Dog Taylor	4:07
13.	"Come On (Part III)"	Earl King	4:33

"SRV Speaks" is from a studio interview with Timothy White for Westwood One Radio. The remaining bonus tracks are studio outtakes from the sessions for the album.

=== 2010 Legacy Edition 2-CD reissue ===
Disc 1 – bonus tracks
No.	Title	Writer(s)	Length
9.	"Empty Arms"	Vaughan	3:28
10.	"Come On (Part III)"	King	4:33
11.	"Look at Little Sister"	Ballard	2:46
12.	"The Sky Is Crying"	Elmore James	4:12
13.	"Hide Away"	King, Thompson	4:03
14.	"Give Me Back My Wig"	Taylor	4:08
15.	"Boot Hill"	Unknown	2:23
16.	"Wham!"	Lonnie Mack	2:27
17.	"Close to You"	Willie Dixon	3:11
18.	"Little Wing"	Hendrix	6:49
19.	"Stang Swang"	Vaughan	2:44

Disc 2 – live in Montreal
No.	Title	Writer(s)	Length
1.	"Testify"	The Isley Brothers	4:37
2.	"Voodoo Chile (Slight Return)"	Hendrix	11:53
3.	"The Things (That) I Used To Do"	Jones	5:30
4.	"Honey Bee"	Vaughan	2:33
5.	"Couldn't Stand the Weather"	Vaughan	4:53
6.	"Cold Shot"	Michael Kindred, W. C. Clark	4:05
7.	"Tin Pan Alley" (a.k.a. "The Roughest Place in Town)"	Robert Geddins	10:30
8.	"Love Struck Baby"	Vaughan	3:01
9.	"Texas Flood"	Larry Davis, Joseph Wade Scott	8:21
10.	"Band Intros/Encores"		1:18
11.	"Stang's Swang"	Vaughan	3:07
12.	"Lenny"	Vaughan	11:07
13.	"Pride and Joy"	Vaughan	4:59

== Personnel ==
Double Trouble

- Stevie Ray Vaughan – vocals, guitar
- Tommy Shannon – bass
- Chris "Whipper" Layton – drums

Additional musicians

- Jimmie Vaughan – rhythm guitar on "Couldn't Stand the Weather" and "The Things That I Used to Do"
- Fran Christina – drums on "Stang's Swang"
- Stan Harrison – tenor saxophone

Production

- Producers – Stevie Ray Vaughan and Double Trouble, Richard Mullen, Jim Capfer
- Executive producer – John H. Hammond
- Engineer – Richard Mullen
- Assistant engineer – Rob Eaton
- Cover art – Holland MacDonald
- Photography – Benno Friedman

1999 reissue

- Producer – Bob Irwin
- Executive producer – Tony Martell
- Mastering engineer – Vic Anesini
- Tracks 10–13 mixed by Danny Kadar
- Dialogue edited by Darcy Proper
- Research assistants – George Deahl, Al Quaglieri, Matthew Kelly, Jon Naatjes
- Art director – Josh Cheuse
- Editorial director – Andy Schwartz
- Liner notes – Bill Milkowski

2010 Legacy Edition issue

- Photography – Jean Krettler, Robert Matheu, James Minchen III
- Liner notes – Andy Aledort

== Charts ==
=== Weekly charts ===
Chart (1984–1985)	Peak position
Australian Albums (Kent Music Report)	20
Canada Top Albums/CDs (RPM)	29
Finnish Albums (The Official Finnish Charts)	8
New Zealand Albums (RMNZ)	5
Norwegian Albums (VG-lista)	14
Swedish Albums (Sverigetopplistan)	36
US Billboard 200	31

=== Year-end charts ===
Chart (1984)	Position
New Zealand Albums (RMNZ)	32

== Certifications ==
Region	Certification	Certified units/sales
Australia (ARIA)	Gold	35,000^{^}
Canada (Music Canada)	Platinum	100,000^{^}
New Zealand (RMNZ)	Platinum	15,000^{^}
United States (RIAA)	2× Platinum	2,000,000^{^}
^{^} Shipments figures based on certification alone.
