= Greezy Wheels =

American band

- Genres: Country rock; progressive country
- Years active: 1970s

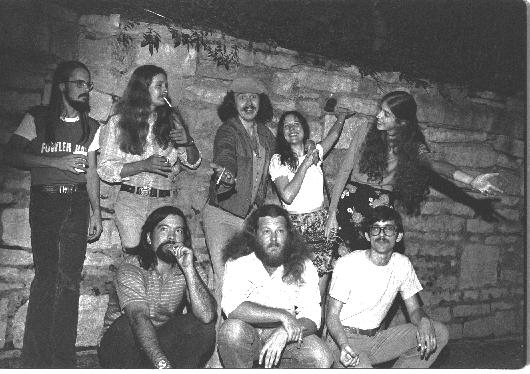
Greezy Wheels in the alley behind the Ritz Theater

Poster advertising Greezy Wheels concert at the Armadillo World Headquarters in 1976.

Greezy Wheels is an Austin, Texas-based band that formed in the 1970s. They played more frequently at the Armadillo World Headquarters than any other band in the history of the venue. They are regarded as the Armadillo house band and are elected members of the Austin Music Hall Of Fame.

Greezy Wheels' music is a blend of rock, funk, R&B, alt-country, and Ozarks. In their early days, they were the only band with a female fiddler, Sweet Mary Hattersley. Sweet Mary consistently brought the crowd to a screaming frenzy with her version of the "Orange Blossom Special". The music of Greezy Wheels reflected the cultural dichotomy of Austin in the 1970s — a unique place where hippies had roots deep in the heart of Texas. Greezy Wheels opened Willie Nelson's first ever Armadillo World Headquarters show, putting him in front of the hippies who then adopted him and have been his fans ever since. They have played with a significant amount of popular artists.

The band played up to 1978, when they took a 23-year hiatus. Greezy Wheels reformed in 2001 and are now recording for their own label, MaHatMa Records, after releasing two CDs on the Tana Records label. Their music has evolved but has kept its distinctive style and difficult to categorize. Principal writer and leader, Cleve Hattersley, continues to write quirky music that gets good airplay around the country. Sweet Mary continues to perform on fiddle.

Current members of the band: Cleve Hattersley on vocals, guitar, slide guitar, Lissa Hattersley on vocals, Sweet Mary Hattersley on fiddle and vocals, Penny Jo Pullus on vocals, Brad Houser (original member of Edie Brickell & New Bohemians) on bass guitar and baritone sax, John Bush (also an original New Bohemian) on drums, and Matt Hubbard (7 Walkers) on keyboards, harmonica, accordion and trombone.

CD's: 'Millennium Greezy' (2001), 'HipPop' (2004), 'String Theory' (2007), 'Gone Greezy' (2011), Kitty Cat Jesus (2013), Unusual Thing (2014)

The old stuff: 'Juz Loves Dem Ol' Greezy Wheels' (1975), 'Radio Radials' (1976) – both on London Records.
