= The Sky Is Crying (song) =

Blues standard written by Elmore James

Single by Elmore James
- B-side: "Held My Baby Last Night"
- Released: March 1960
- Recorded: Chicago, November 3 or 4, 1959
- Genre: Blues
- Length: 2:47
- Label: Fire
- Songwriter: Elmore James
- Producer: Bobby Robinson

"The Sky Is Crying" is a blues standard written and initially recorded by Elmore James in 1959. Called "one of his most durable compositions", "The Sky Is Crying" became a R&B record chart hit and has been interpreted and recorded by numerous artists.

== Composition and recording ==
"The Sky Is Crying" is a slow-tempo twelve-bar blues notated in 12/8 time in the key of C. It is an impromptu song inspired by a Chicago downpour during the recording session:

The sky is crying, look at the tears roll down the street (2×)
I'm waiting in tears looking for my baby, and I wonder where can she be?

The songs features prominent slide guitar by James with his vocals, accompanied by his longtime backing band, the Broomdusters: J. T. Brown on saxophone, Johnny Jones on piano, Odie Payne on drums, and Homesick James on bass. James' unique slide guitar sound on the recording has generated some debate; Homesick James attributed it to a recording studio technique, others have suggested a different amplifier or guitar setup, and Ry Cooder felt that it was an altogether different guitar than James' usual Kay acoustic with an attached pickup.

== Release and recognition ==
The single, with the artist credit "Elmo James and His Broomdusters", reached number 15 on Billboard magazine's Hot R&B Sides chart in 1960, making it James' last chart showing before his death in 1963. James recorded a variation of the song, "The Sun Is Shining", in April 1960, five months after the recording date of "The Sky Is Crying" (although some places "Sun" as a precursor to "Sky", possibly because the bulk of James' recordings for Fire/Fury/Enjoy took place after the Chess recordings).

"The Sky Is Crying" is identified as a blues standard and in 1991, James' original was inducted into the Blues Foundation Hall of Fame in the "Classics of Blues Recordings" category. Record producer Bobby Robinson noted that the song is "a magnificent vehicle both for Elmore's emotion-packed blues vocal and his ringing slide guitar".

== Renditions ==
In 1969, Albert King recorded "The Sky Is Crying" for the album Years Gone By. Unlike James, who played it with a slide, King used a fretted approach on guitar.

Stevie Ray Vaughan later performed the song regularly as an apparent tribute to King. He and his backing band, Double Trouble, recorded versions during the sessions for their 1984 album Couldn't Stand the Weather and 1985's Soul to Soul. Neither was released until the posthumous compilations Blues at Sunrise (2000) and The Sky Is Crying (1991), respectively. Critic Dan Forte noted, "Stevie tips his Clint Eastwood hat to two of his idols: Elmore James, who wrote the tune, and Albert King, who also recorded it, and whose influence is evident in every lick and bend here [on the 1991 release]."

The song was covered by George Thorogood with his band George Thorogood and the Delaware Destroyers on their album Move It On Over, which was released in 1978. Thorogood recorded it with heavy use of the slide guitar. His lyrics were a modified version of the Elmore James version. He has continued to play it in live shows since then.

In 1992 the song was covered by soul blues singer Gary B.B. Coleman in his album Too Much Weekend.

Eric Clapton covered this song on his 1975 album There's One in Every Crowd, and played a version of the song at a small live show at RD Studios in Park Royal, London, on December 8, 2023. The album, To Save A Child: An Intimate Live Concert, was released digitally on April 26, 2024. The proceeds benefit children in Gaza.
