= Wolfgang's =

Music archive company

- Website type: Music, free music, retail
- Available in: English
- Headquarters: San Francisco, New York, {{{location_country}}}
- Owners: Norton LLC, William Sagan
- Website: wolfgangs.com
- Commercial: Yes
- Registration: Free, premium membership available
- Launched: October 6, 2003

Wolfgang's (formerly Wolfgang's Vault) is an American private music-focused company established in 2002, dedicated to the restoration and archiving of audio and video concert recordings and the sale of music memorabilia. It began with the collection of the promoter Bill Graham, and added multiple other music and memorabilia archives.

== History ==
Wolfgang's was founded by William E. Sagan, who purchased a warehouse filled with Bill Graham Productions memorabilia in 2003, including taped concert recordings, for about $6 million. These materials had multiple owners after the death of Bill Graham, the concert promoter, in 1991. The name Wolfgang's is inspired by Bill Graham's original name, Wolodia "Wolfgang" Grajonca.

The company launched its website in November 2003. Later that year, Wolfgang's released the BG Archive photography collection, and subsequently added collections called "vaults" for: vintage poster art, rock clothing, vintage audio concert recordings. The Video Vault was added in 2011. On August 7, 2012, Wolfgang's announced to its free streaming service users, via email, that later converted to a subscription based model on August 8, 2012.

In late 2016, the company changed its name from Wolfgang's Vault to simply Wolfgang's.

== Music ==
Beginning in the late 1960s, Graham recorded thousands of performances, which he stored on tapes in the basement of the Bill Graham Presents headquarters. Bill Sagan acquired these recordings in 2003, and had them restored and digitized for presentation on the Concert Vault of audio recordings. In February 2006, Wolfgang's launched Vault Radio to allow fans of the music to hear some of these recordings. In an article about Vault Radio, The Washington Times noted "lovers of classic rock will not find a better historical source for their favorite music anywhere on the Internet."

In October 2006, Wolfgang's Music became a fully interactive service, with 300 concerts available for streaming. As of May 2020 over 25,000 performances are available in Wolfgang's Music for audio or video streaming.

Radio France's "Un jour sur la toile" named Wolfgang's their No. 1 website of the year in 2008. PC Magazine named it one of the best five undiscovered music sites of the year in 2008. MacWorld named the free iPhone app the world's best iPhone app of 2009. It was called "the most important collection of rock memorabilia and recordings ever assembled in one business" by The Wall Street Journal.

== Other properties ==
- Wolfgang's bought Crawdaddy! in 2006, and relaunched it in 2007, and relocated it in August 2011 to a blog at the newly acquired Paste magazine.
- Wolfgang's bought a majority stake in Daytrotter in 2008.
- Wolfgang's bought the Ash Grove (music club) blues archive in 2009.
- Wolfgang's bought the Newport Jazz and Newport Folk Festival archives in 2010.
- Wolfgang's bought Paste magazine in 2011.

== Legal issues ==
In 2006, some bands whose materials were being sold or streamed sued Sagan for infringement of rights, saying that the rights in the materials being brokered by Wolfgang's belong to the artists themselves. Among the groups represented were Led Zeppelin, The Doors, Grateful Dead and Carlos Santana. In 2008, works by artists Lynyrd Skynyrd, Bob Marley and Jimi Hendrix that were owned by Wolfgang's became available through an agreement between the company and Universal Music Group.

== See also ==
- Bill Graham Archives v. Dorling Kindersley, Ltd., 448 F.3d 605 (2d Cir. 2006)
