= In Step =

Studio album by Stevie Ray Vaughan and Double Trouble
- Released: June 13, 1989
- Recorded: January 25 – March 13, 1989
- Studios: Kiva Studios, Memphis, Tennessee; Sound Castle and Summa Studios, Los Angeles, CA
- Genres: Blues rock; rock and roll; blues
- Length: 40:53
- Label: Epic
- Producers: Double Trouble, Jim Gaines

Stevie Ray Vaughan and Double Trouble chronology
Live Alive (1986)	In Step (1989)	The Sky Is Crying (1991)

Singles from In Step
- 1. "The House Is Rockin'/Tightrope" Released: 1989; 2. "Crossfire" Released: 1989; 3. "Wall of Denial" Released: 1989; 4. "Tightrope" Released: 1989

In Step is the fourth studio album by Stevie Ray Vaughan and Double Trouble, released in 1989. The title In Step can be seen as referring to Vaughan's new-found sobriety, following the years of drug and alcohol use that eventually led Vaughan into rehabilitation. It was also Vaughan's final album with Double Trouble and the last album to be released during his lifetime. In 1990, he recorded an album with his brother, Jimmie Vaughan, called Family Style; later that same year, Stevie Ray died in a helicopter crash.

At the 32nd Annual Grammy Awards in 1990, the album won the Grammy for Best Contemporary Blues Recording.

In 1999, a reissue of the album was released which contains an audio interview segment and four live bonus tracks.

== Reception ==
Professional ratings
Review scores
Source	Rating
AllMusic	5/5 stars
Robert Christgau	A−
The Great Rock Discography	6/10
The Penguin Guide to Blues Recordings	3/4 stars

Reviews for In Step have generally been positive. Robert Christgau rated the album an A−, signifying "a very good record." Although he stated that "Wall of Denial" and "Tightrope" fall into ex-addict jargon like it was natural speech and that "if the music was preachy or wimpy this would be a disaster," he concluded that "House Is Rockin'" keeps on boogieing on and that on the mood-jazz closer he escapes the blues undamaged for the first time in his career.

Lou Reed selected In Step as one of his 'picks of 1989'.

In a retrospective review, Stephen Thomas Erlewine of AllMusic rated In Step five out of five stars. He noted that before the album was released, "his songwriting was hit or miss. Even when he wrote a classic modern blues song, it was firmly within the genre's conventions." He further stated that it helped "Vaughan found his own songwriting voice, blending blues, soul, and rock in unique ways, and writing with startling emotional honesty." Although he stated that "tunes like the terse "Tightrope" and the dense "Wall of Denial" feel so intensely personal, it's hard to believe that they weren't the product of just one man", he also stated that "the lighter numbers [...] are just as effective as songs." He concluded that "it's fully realized, presenting every facet of Vaughan's musical personality, yet it still soars with a sense of discovery. It's a bittersweet triumph, given Vaughan's tragic death, [...] yet it's a triumph all the same."

The song “The House Is Rockin’” is featured on the ending credits of the 1994 film “Major League II”.

== Track listing ==
=== Original release ===
No.	Title	Writer(s)	Length
1.	"The House Is Rockin'"	Doyle Bramhall, Stevie Ray Vaughan	2:24
2.	"Crossfire"	Tommy Shannon, Chris Layton, Reese Wynans, Bill Carter, Ruth Ellsworth	4:10
3.	"Tightrope"	Bramhall, Vaughan	4:40
4.	"Let Me Love You Baby"	Willie Dixon	2:43
5.	"Leave My Girl Alone"	Buddy Guy	4:15
6.	"Travis Walk"	Vaughan	2:19
7.	"Wall of Denial"	Bramhall, Vaughan	5:36
8.	"Scratch-N-Sniff"	Bramhall, Vaughan	2:43
9.	"Love Me Darlin'"	Howlin' Wolf	3:21
10.	"Riviera Paradise"	Vaughan	8:49

=== 1999 Reissue bonus tracks ===
No.	Title	Writer(s)	Length
11.	"SRV Speaks"		1:33
12.	"The House is Rockin'" (Live)	Doyle Bramhall, Vaughan	2:48
13.	"Let Me Love You Baby" (Live)	Willie Dixon	3:46
14.	"Texas Flood" (Live)	Larry Davis, Joseph Wade Scott	7:28
15.	"Life Without You" (Live)	Vaughan	13:17

The bonus tracks are all taken from recordings for Westwood One Radio. "SRV Speaks" is from a studio interview with Timothy White. The rest are all from recordings for the Superstar Concert Series broadcast. The next three tracks are from Tingley Coliseum, Albuquerque on November 28, 1989. The last is from McNichols Arena, Denver on November 29, 1989.

== Personnel ==
Double Trouble

- Stevie Ray Vaughan – guitar, vocals
- Tommy Shannon – bass guitar
- Chris "Whipper" Layton – drums, percussion
- Reese Wynans – keyboards

Additional personnel

- Texacali Horns – on "Crossfire" and "Love Me Darlin'"
  - Joe Sublett – saxophone
  - Darrell Leonard – trumpet

== Charts ==
Chart (1989)	Peak position
Australian Albums (ARIA)	36
Canada Top Albums/CDs (RPM)	20
Dutch Albums (Album Top 100)	44
Finnish Albums (The Official Finnish Charts)	8
New Zealand Albums (RMNZ)	16
Swedish Albums (Sverigetopplistan)	41
Swiss Albums (Schweizer Hitparade)	24
UK Albums (Official Charts)	63
US Billboard 200	33

== Certifications ==
Region	Certification	Certified units/sales
Canada (Music Canada)	Gold	50,000^{^}
United States (RIAA)	2× Platinum	2,000,000^{^}
^{^} Shipments figures based on certification alone.

== Awards ==
Grammy Awards

Year	Winner	Category
1989	Stevie Ray Vaughan	Best Contemporary Blues Album
