= Soul to Soul (album) =

Studio album by Stevie Ray Vaughan and Double Trouble
- Released: September 30, 1985
- Recorded: March–May 1985
- Studios: Dallas Sound Lab (Dallas, Texas)
- Genres: Texas blues; blues rock; electric blues
- Length: 39:53
- Labels: Epic, Legacy
- Producers: Stevie Ray Vaughan and Double Trouble, Richard Mullen

Stevie Ray Vaughan and Double Trouble chronology
Couldn't Stand the Weather (1984)	Soul to Soul (1985)	Live Alive (1986)

Singles from Soul to Soul
- 1. "Lookin' Out the Window" Released: 1985; 2. "Look at Little Sister" Released: 1985

Professional ratings
Review scores
Source	Rating
AllMusic	3/5 stars
Christgau's Record Guide	B+
The Great Rock Discography	7/10
Kerrang!	5/5 stars
The Penguin Guide to Blues Recordings	3/4 stars

Soul to Soul is the third studio album by American blues rock band Stevie Ray Vaughan and Double Trouble released on September 30, 1985, by Epic Records. Recording sessions took place between March and May 1985 at the Dallas Sound Lab in Dallas, Texas. Vaughan wrote four of Soul to Soul's ten tracks; two songs were released as singles. The album went to #34 on the Billboard 200 chart and the music video for "Change It" received regular rotation on MTV. In 1999, a reissue of the album was released, which includes an audio interview segment and two studio outtakes.

Soul to Soul received generally positive reviews, with acclaim for Vaughan's style and playing, and criticism for a lack of inspiration and Vaughan's “hit or miss songwriting.”

In 1999, a reissue of the album was released which contains an audio interview segment and studio outtakes. In 2014, Analogue Productions Remaster used the original master tape for the first time since the first CD edition. The lyrics before the guitar solo on "Life Without You" have been restored audibly, whereas on other CD editions since 1999 they had been edited out.

== Track listing ==
=== Original release ===
All tracks are written by Stevie Ray Vaughan, except where noted.

Side A
No.	Title	Writer(s)	Length
1.	"Say What!"		5:23
2.	"Lookin' Out the Window"	Doyle Bramhall	2:48
3.	"Look at Little Sister"	Hank Ballard	3:08
4.	"Ain't Gone 'n' Give Up on Love"		6:07
5.	"Gone Home"	Eddie Harris	3:07

Side B
No.	Title	Writer(s)	Length
6.	"Change It"	Bramhall	3:57
7.	"You'll Be Mine"	Willie Dixon	3:46
8.	"Empty Arms"		3:03
9.	"Come On (Part III)"	Earl King	4:31
10.	"Life Without You"		4:18

=== 1999 reissue bonus tracks ===
No.	Title	Writer(s)	Length
11.	"SRV Speaks"		1:42
12.	"Little Wing/Third Stone from the Sun (instrumental)"	Jimi Hendrix	13:32
13.	"Slip Slidin' Slim (instrumental)"	Vaughan	1:42

"SRV Speaks" is from a studio interview with Timothy White for Westwood One Radio. The remaining bonus tracks are studio outtakes from the sessions for the album.

== Personnel ==
Double Trouble

- Stevie Ray Vaughan – guitar, vocals, drums on "Empty Arms"
- Tommy Shannon – bass, vocals on "Say What!"
- Chris "Whipper" Layton – drums, vocals on "Say What!"
- Reese Wynans – keyboards, vocals on "Say What!"

Additional personnel

- Joe Sublett – saxophone on "Lookin' Out the Window" and "Look at Little Sister"

Production

- Producers – Stevie Ray Vaughan and Double Trouble, Richard Mullen
- Executive producer – John H. Hammond
- Engineer – Richard Mullen
- Assistant engineer – Ron Cote
- Cover art – Holland MacDonald

1999 reissue - with edited lyrics on "Life Without You"

- Producer – Bob Irwin
- Executive producer – Tony Martell
- Mastering engineer – Vic Anesini
- Tracks 11–13 mixed by Danny Kadar
- Dialogue edited by Darcy Proper
- Research assistants – Al Quaglieri, Matthew Kelly
- Art director – Josh Cheuse
- Editorial director – Andy Schwartz
- Liner notes – Timothy White

== Charts ==
Chart (1985–1986)	Peak position
Australian Albums (Kent Music Report)	27
Canada Top Albums/CDs (RPM)	25
Dutch Albums (Album Top 100)	48
Finnish Albums (The Official Finnish Charts)	3
New Zealand Albums (RMNZ)	16
Swedish Albums (Sverigetopplistan)	39
Swiss Albums (Schweizer Hitparade)	18
US Billboard 200	34

== Certifications ==
Region	Certification	Certified units/sales
Canada (Music Canada)	Gold	50,000^{^}
New Zealand (RMNZ)	Gold	7,500^{^}
United States (RIAA)	Platinum	1,000,000^{^}
^{^} Shipments figures based on certification alone.
