= Chitlins con Carne =

Instrumental by Kenny Burrell

from the album Midnight Blue
- Released: 1963
- Recorded: April 21, 1963
- Genre: Jazz blues
- Length: 5:30
- Label: Blue Note
- Composer: Kenny Burrell
- Producers: Michael Cuscuna, Alfred Lion, Tom Vasatka

"Chitlins con Carne" is a jazz blues instrumental composed by guitarist Kenny Burrell and first released on his 1963 album Midnight Blue. The original version featured Burrell on guitar, Stanley Turrentine on tenor saxophone, Major Holley on bass, Billy Gene English on drums, and Ray Barretto on congas.

The tune has been covered by numerous artists, including Sonny Cox, Buddy Guy, Jimmy Dawkins, Big John Patton, Otis Rush, Horace Silver, Sonny Moorman, Junior Wells and Stevie Ray Vaughan on The Sky Is Crying (1991). It is included in Hal Leonard's Real Book, Volume I and the All Jazz Real Book by Chuck Sher.
