= In the Beginning (Stevie Ray Vaughan album) =

Live album by Stevie Ray Vaughan and Double Trouble
- Released: October 6, 1992
- Recorded: April 1, 1980
- Venue: Steamboat 1874 (Austin, Texas)
- Genre: Electric blues
- Length: 38:32
- Label: Epic
- Producer: Wayne Bell (for radio)

Stevie Ray Vaughan and Double Trouble chronology
The Sky Is Crying (1991)	In the Beginning (1992)	Greatest Hits (1995)

In the Beginning is the second live album by Stevie (Ray) Vaughan and Double Trouble (the stage name at that time did not include Vaughan's middle name). While the album was released about two years after Vaughan's death in 1990, the actual performance took place on April 1, 1980, at Steamboat 1874 in Austin, Texas, and was broadcast live on KLBJ-FM radio. A 25-year-old Vaughan, still more than three years away from the release of his first studio album, performs with his "Double Trouble" bandmates: Chris Layton, drummer, and Jackie Newhouse, bassist. (Newhouse was replaced by bassist Tommy Shannon in January 1981, who would remain part of Double Trouble until Stevie's death.)

== Critical reception ==
Professional ratings
Review scores
Source	Rating
The Penguin Guide to Blues Recordings	3/4 stars

Writing in 1993 for The Village Voice, Robert Christgau called Vaughan "unfledged" and the performance "blues as a barely controllable torrent of electric sound", while naming "Shake for Me" and "Tin Pan Alley" as highlights. He later assigned In the Beginning a three-star honorable mention grade, indicating "an enjoyable effort consumers attuned to its overriding aesthetic or individual vision may well treasure". AllMusic's Cub Koda gave it two out of five stars and recommended the album to Vaughan fans. He said it showcased the guitarist's signature sound, "albeit still in need of some polishing", while highlighting the songs "In the Open" and "Tin Pan Alley".

== Track listing ==
1. "In the Open" (Sonny Thompson, Freddie King) – 5:57
2. "Slide Thing" (Stevie Ray Vaughan) – 3:18
3. "They Call Me Guitar Hurricane" (Eddie Jones (Guitar Slim)) – 3:06
4. "All Your Love (I Miss Loving)" (Otis Rush) – 6:23
5. "Tin Pan Alley (aka Roughest Place in Town)" (Robert Geddins) – 7:40
6. "Love Struck Baby" (Stevie Ray Vaughan) – 2:56
7. "Tell Me" (Chester Burnett (Howlin' Wolf)) – 2:48
8. "Shake for Me" (Willie Dixon) – 4:04
9. "Live Another Day" (Stevie Ray Vaughan) – 3:49

== Charts ==
Chart (1992)	Peak position
Dutch Albums (Album Top 100)	86
US Billboard 200	58

== Certifications ==
Region	Certification	Certified units/sales
United States (RIAA)	Gold	500,000^{^}
^{^} Shipments figures based on certification alone.
