= Tony Martell =

American music executive (1926–2016)

- Born: June 23, 1926
- Died: November 27, 2016 (aged 90); Madison, New Jersey, U.S.
- Occupations: Music industry senior executive founder, T.J. Martell Foundation
- Years active: 1960s–2016
- Spouse: Vicky Martell
- Children: T.J., Debbie

Tony Martell (June 23, 1926 – November 27, 2016), also known as T.J. Martell, was an American music industry executive and philanthropist. He was the founder of the T.J. Martell Foundation, the music industry's largest foundation for leukemia, cancer, and AIDS research.

== Career ==
Martell's music industry career spanned four decades, from the 1960s to the 1990s. Employed primarily by CBS Records (now Sony Music Entertainment) and its subsidiaries, Martell worked with musicians who covered a wide range of musical styles including jazz, rock, soul, pop, blues, and heavy metal.

In the 1960s and 1970s, Martell helped direct the careers of The Isley Brothers, and The O'Jays. He was instrumental in bringing both Stevie Ray Vaughan and Ozzy Osbourne to Epic Records. He is credited as Executive Producer on over 50 albums for artists such as Stevie Ray Vaughan, The Isley Brothers, The O'Jays, George Benson, Gerry Mulligan, Jim Hall, Lalo Schifrin, Bill Withers, Patti Austin, George Duke, Harold Melvin & the Blue Notes, Eumir Deodato, and Stanley Turrentine.

In the 1980s, Martell was head of the imprint label CBS Associated Records, which was part of the E/P/A label group (Epic/Portrait/Associate). Martell continued his work with Ozzy Osbourne at CBS Associated Records, and signed The Fabulous Thunderbirds, Electric Light Orchestra, Joan Jett, and Henry Lee Summer amongst others to the label.

== Philanthropy ==
In 1973, Martell's teenage son T.J. Martell was diagnosed with leukemia, and died in 1975 at the age of 21. Tony Martell began fundraising efforts for cancer research with a dinner in New York City featuring the music of friends Buddy Rich, Duke Ellington, Benny Goodman, and Ella Fitzgerald and soon established the T.J. Martell Foundation in memory of his son.

For over forty-three years, the foundation has been one of the primary charitable organizations associated with the music industry and a leader in funding for innovative leukemia, cancer, and AIDS research (having raised over $285 million). The T.J. Martell Foundation maintains offices in New York, Los Angeles, and Nashville, and sponsors events nationally and internationally.

Martell retired from the music industry and was involved in the work of the foundation until his death. His status and long-standing relationships with artists and executives within the music community are still invaluable assets to the foundation's work.

In 1996, several country music artists recorded a charity single titled "Hope: Country Music's Quest for a Cure", whose proceeds were donated to the foundation to aid cancer research. The song featured vocals from John Berry, Terri Clark, Vince Gill, Faith Hill, Tracy Lawrence, Little Texas, Neal McCoy, Tim McGraw, Lorrie Morgan, Marty Stuart, Travis Tritt, and Trisha Yearwood. It was released via Giant Records, and it charted at number 57 on Hot Country Songs in May of that year.

== Personal life and death ==
Martell was married to Vicky Martell, who died on February 21, 2016. They had a daughter, Debbie Martell, and they resided in Madison, New Jersey, where he died on November 27, 2016, at the age of 90.
