= The Sky Is Crying (album) =

Studio album by Stevie Ray Vaughan and Double Trouble
- Released: November 5, 1991
- Recorded: January 1984 – May 1989
- Genres: Texas blues; electric blues
- Length: 38:28
- Label: Epic
- Compiler: Jimmie Vaughan

Stevie Ray Vaughan and Double Trouble chronology
In Step (1989)	The Sky Is Crying (1991)	In the Beginning (1992)

Professional ratings
Review scores
Source	Rating
AllMusic	4/5 stars
Christgau's Consumer Guide	(3-star Honorable Mention)
The Great Rock Discography	7/10
The Penguin Guide to Blues Recordings	3.5/4 stars

The Sky Is Crying is the fifth and final studio album by Stevie Ray Vaughan and Double Trouble, compiling songs recorded throughout most of their career. Released 14 months after Vaughan's death in 1990, the album features ten previously unreleased tracks recorded between 1984 and 1989. Only one title, "Empty Arms" (complete reprisal), appeared on any of the group's previous albums. The tracks were compiled by Vaughan's brother, Jimmie Vaughan, and was Vaughan's highest charting album at number 10.

The album received mostly positive reviews. Critics praised the blues and jazz styles, and the solid track listing, but criticized the lack of original songs.

The Sky Is Crying illustrates many of Vaughan's musical influences, including songs in the style of traditional Delta blues, Texas blues, Chicago blues, jump blues, jazz blues, and Jimi Hendrix's blues-rock. The album's tone alternates primarily between uptempo pieces and gritty, slow blues. The album includes a Grammy-winning extended instrumental cover version of Jimi Hendrix's "Little Wing"; Kenny Burrell's "Chitlins con Carne", a jazz instrumental; and, "Life by the Drop", a song written by Vaughan's friend Doyle Bramhall and played on a twelve-string acoustic guitar.

== Track listing ==
Album details are taken from the original 1991 Epic Records CD liner notes and may differ from other sources; track timings are from the AllMusic album review.

1. "Boot Hill" (Unknown) – 2:15
2. "The Sky Is Crying" (Elmore James, Morris Levy, Clarence Lewis) – 4:38
3. "Empty Arms" (Stevie Ray Vaughan) – 3:31
4. "Little Wing" (instrumental) (Jimi Hendrix) – 6:50
5. "Wham" (instrumental) (Lonnie Mack) – 2:27
6. "May I Have a Talk with You" (Chester Burnett a.k.a. Howlin' Wolf) – 5:50
7. "Close to You" (Willie Dixon) – 3:13
8. "Chitlins con Carne" (instrumental) (Kenny Burrell) – 3:59
9. "So Excited" (instrumental) (Vaughan) – 3:32
10. "Life by the Drop" (Doyle Bramhall, Barbara Logan) – 2:27

== Personnel ==
Stevie Ray Vaughan and Double Trouble

- Stevie Ray Vaughan – guitars, vocals
- Chris Layton – drums
- Tommy Shannon – bass guitar
- Reese Wynans – keyboards

Production

- Track 1 produced by Jim Gaines and Stevie Ray Vaughan and Double Trouble

Recorded at Kiva Studios, Memphis, Tennessee, 2/89–4/89
Engineered by Jim Gaines and Richard Mullen
Assistant engineers – Evan Rush, Danny Jones

- Tracks 2, 6, 8, and 9 produced by Stevie Ray Vaughan and Double Trouble and Richard Mullen

Recorded at The Dallas Sound Lab, Dallas, Texas, 3/85–5/85
Engineered by Richard Mullen
Assistant engineer – Ron Cote

- Tracks 3–5 and 7 produced by Stevie Ray Vaughan, Chris Layton, Tommy Shannon, Richard Mullen, and Jim Capfer

Recorded at The Power Station, New York City, 1/84–2/84
Engineered by Richard Mullen
Assistant engineer – Rob Eaton

- Track 10 produced by Stevie Ray Vaughan and Jim Gaines

Recorded at Sound Castle Studios, Los Angeles, 4/89–5/89

- Compilation and additional production – Jimmie Vaughan
- Mixed and engineered by Richard Mullen
- Assistant engineer – Jeff Powell
- Production coordination – Mark Proct, Mark Rutledge, Roger Klein
- Mastered by Bob Ludwig
- Art direction – Arnold Levine/Mark Burdett
- Photography – William Snyder
- Inside photo – Stephanie Chernakowski
- Band photo – Alan Messer

== Charts ==
Chart (1991–1992)	Peak position
Australian Albums (ARIA)	33
Canada Top Albums/CDs (RPM)	15
Dutch Albums (Album Top 100)	74
Finnish Albums (The Official Finnish Charts)	18
New Zealand Albums (RMNZ)	20
Norwegian Albums (VG-lista)	16
Swedish Albums (Sverigetopplistan)	46
US Billboard 200	10

== Certifications ==
Region	Certification	Certified units/sales
Canada (Music Canada)	Platinum	100,000^{^}
United States (RIAA)	2× Platinum	2,000,000^{^}
^{^} Shipments figures based on certification alone.
