= Texas Flood (song) =

Song first recorded by Larry Davis in 1958

Single by Larry Davis
- A-side: "I Tried"
- Released: 1958
- Recorded: Houston, Texas, 1958
- Genre: Blues
- Length: 2:35
- Label: Duke
- Songwriters: Larry Davis, Joseph Scott

Larry Davis singles chronology
"Texas Flood" (1958)	"Angels in Houston" (1959)

"Texas Flood" (sometimes called "Stormin' in Texas" or "Flood Down in Texas") is a blues song recorded by Larry Davis in 1958. Considered a blues standard, it has been recorded by several artists, including Stevie Ray Vaughan, who made it part of his repertoire and named his first album after it.

== Original song ==
"Texas Flood" is a slow-tempo twelve-bar blues notated in 12/8 time in the key of A flat. Davis wrote it in California in 1955 and (although label owner Don Robey put his name on the single as a writer), the song was (later) credited to Davis and Duke Records arranger/trumpeter Joseph Scott. Nominally about a flood in Texas, Davis used it as a metaphor for his relationship problems:

Well I'm leavin' you baby, Lord I'm goin' back home to stay (2×)
Well where there's no floods or tornadoes, baby the sun shines every day

Although Davis later became a guitar player, for "Texas Flood" Fenton Robinson provided the distinctive guitar parts, with Davis on vocals and bass, James Booker on piano, David Dean on tenor saxophone, Booker Crutchfield on baritone saxophone, and an unknown drummer. The song was Davis' first single as a leader and became a regional hit.

== Stevie Ray Vaughan version ==
"Texas Flood"

Song by Stevie Ray Vaughan and Double Trouble

from the album Texas Flood
- Released: June 13, 1983
- Recorded: November 22, 1982
- Studio: Down Town, Los Angeles
- Genre: Texas blues, blues rock
- Length: 5:21
- Label: Epic
- Songwriters: Larry Davis, Joe Scott
- Producers: Stevie Ray Vaughan & Double Trouble, Richard Mullen

"Texas Flood"
Thirty second sample of Vaughan's version

According to Clifford Antone, Stevie Ray Vaughan was introduced to "Texas Flood" by Angela Strehli at Antone's club in Austin, Texas, where the three of them worked out the song. Vaughan drummer Chris Layton recalled that Albert King brought Larry Davis to the club several times, where Vaughan was attracted to the "intriguing guitar parts".

In 1983, Vaughan recorded "Texas Flood" as the title track for his debut album, also titled Texas Flood. He followed Davis' song, although he added several twelve-bar sections of improvised guitar soloing, which nearly doubled the length of the song and provided a showcase for his electric guitar style. Although Vaughan performed it in using G fingering, he tuned his guitar one-half step lower; as a result the song is played in the key of G-flat major.

Vaughan recorded several live versions of "Texas Flood" during his career, which appeared on such albums as Live Alive (1986), Live at Montreux 1982 & 1985 (released 2001), Live in Tokyo (1985, released 2006), and the videos Live at the El Mocambo (1983, released 1991) and Live from Austin, Texas (1983, released 1995). Vaughan's version is listed at number 66 by Rolling Stone magazine in its "100 Greatest Guitar Songs of All Time"
