= Reese Wynans =

American keyboard player (born 1947)

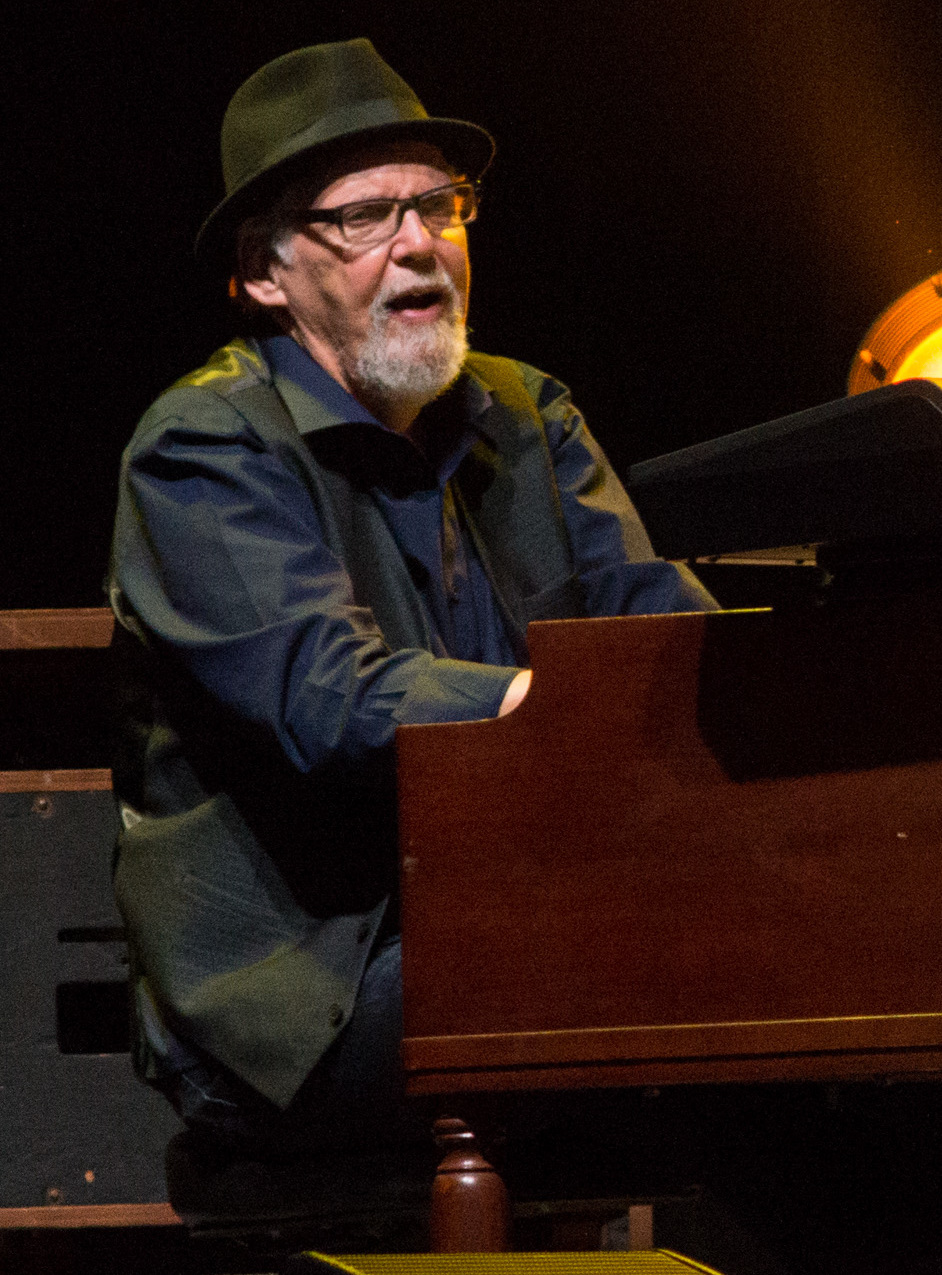
Wynans with Joe Bonamassa, Radio City Music Hall, January 2015

Reese Wynans (born November 28, 1947) is an American keyboard player, who has performed and toured with various artists since he entered the scene in 1967, most notably as a member of Double Trouble and progressive rock band Captain Beyond. In 2015, he was inducted into the Rock and Roll Hall of Fame as a member of Double Trouble.

== Personal life ==
Raised in Sarasota, Florida, Wynans and his six siblings were inspired by their father to take piano lessons at early ages, but he was the only one who "really loved playing." Sticking with piano lessons through adolescence, Wynans was a featured soloist in his high school orchestra and was named 'Most Talented' by his senior class. He went on to attend Florida State University where he majored in Music Education. During this time, he was tapped to play with The Prowlers, known for their win at the 1965 Battle of the Bands in Miami which allowed them to open for The Byrds during their US tour. This was Wynans' first proper experience seeing a rock band live, changing the trajectory of his career.

== Musical career ==
Upon leaving FSU in 1967, Wynans returned to Sarasota where his career began.

=== 1967-1969: The Second Coming ===
After stints with bands like the Illusions and Joe Bill & The Playboys, Wynans went to Jacksonville and became a member of the Second Coming. From November, 1968 to March, 1969, The Second Coming included two future and founding members of The Allman Brothers Band: guitarist Dickey Betts and bassist Berry Oakley, with other band members were Dale Betts, Larry (Rhino) Reinhardt, and John Meeks. Wynans spent two years living and playing with the band in packed out shows every night of the week. All of this changed in 1969. Wynans was involved in the initial jam sessions with Duane Allman, Betts, Oakley, Butch Trucks, and Jaimoe that led to the formation of the Allman Brothers Band, but was eased aside in favor of vocalist Gregg Allman, as founder Duane Allman did not want two keyboardists, two guitarists, and two drummers all in the same band.

The Second Coming split into the Allman Brothers Band and the Load, a band led by Rhino, which Wynans ended up joining with Richard and Monty Yaery. The band was renamed The New Second Coming after Wynans joined.

=== 1970-1982: Captain Beyond and More ===
After The New Second Coming broke up, Wynans made his way to San Francisco to join a new band Boz Scaggs was putting together. Wynans played with Scaggs for a year and then returned to Florida to tour up and down the East Coast with Pandemonium.

In 1973 he played with Captain Beyond and was on the album Sufficiently Breathless. He quit after just one show with the band, later explaining, "Captain Beyond was a great band to play with, but from the management side it was terribly organized... I was very poor at that time, living in somebody´s else garage, so I needed to work"

In 1975, Wynans relocated to Austin, TX to join the Jerry Jeff Walker band. They recorded several albums between 1975 and 1982 and toured the US extensively with band members Dave Perkins, Bobby Rambo, Leo Lablanc, Tomas Ramirez, Ron Cobb, and Fred Krc. During this time, He gained his stride as a session and performing musician; playing with The Explosives along with Joe Ely, Los Gonzo Band, and Carole King.

=== 1982-1985: Delbert McClinton ===
In 1982, wanting to focus on the blues, Wynans joined the Delbert McClinton band. With Delbert, he played shows in 45 states, was on SNL twice, and contributed to two albums.

Wynans also played piano on many of the tracks on Carole King's albums Touch the Sky and One to One and appears on her VHS recording of the same name. He toured with King during the One to One European tour.

=== 1985–1990: Stevie Ray Vaughan & Double Trouble ===
Wynans joined Stevie Ray Vaughan and Double Trouble in 1985, playing keyboards on 5 albums, including Soul to Soul and In Step. Wynans received the Austin Chronicle "Best Song of the Year" Award in 1990 for Crossfire and performed with the group until Vaughan's death that same year. By then, the group had earned 3 Grammys, had headlined festivals across the US and Europe and created a legacy that is still recognized to this day.

After Vaughan's death, Wynans joined the touring bands of Joe Ely and Lee Roy Parnell.

=== 1992–2015: Country Music ===
Wynans moved to Nashville, Tennessee in 1992, and since then has played keyboards for a number of country artists including Brooks & Dunn, Trisha Yearwood, Martina McBride, and Hank Williams Jr. Wynans has also played for blues artists Buddy Guy, John Mayall, Kenny Wayne Shepherd, Colin James, Ana Popović, Dudley Taft, Eli Cook, and Los Lonely Boys.

Wynans performed on six of the 13 songs on The Nashville Sessions, a 1999 album released by Colorado jamband Leftover Salmon. The album featured many musical collaborations, with Wynans contributions coming on songs featuring musicians such as Béla Fleck, Jerry Douglas, and Randy Scruggs.

In 2006, Wynans contributed B3 organ to two songs on the self-titled album from Black Stone Cherry.

In late 2014 and early 2015, Wynans was inducted into the Musician's Hall of Fame, Austin City Limits Hall of Fame, and the Rock and Roll Hall of Fame all as a part of Stevie Ray Vaughan & Double Trouble.

=== 2015-present ===
In 2015, he became the touring keyboard player for blues rock guitarist Joe Bonamassa. Wynans had previously played keyboards on Bonamassa's 2014 album Different Shades of Blue and on his "Muddy Wolf" tour, where Bonamassa played songs originally recorded by Muddy Waters and Howlin' Wolf. Wynans made his first in-person appearance with Bonamassa on his winter 2016 tour and featured on his album. He continued touring with the blues rocker through 2025. Blues of Desperation.

In March 2019, Wynans' album, Reese Wynans and Friends: Sweet Release, spent two weeks at number 2 in the US Billboard Blues Albums Chart.

In March 2020 Wynans came full circle, replacing the late Gregg Allman on organ for the special The Brothers 50 celebratory concert, that marked 50 years since the formation of the Allman Brothers Band, at Madison Square Garden.

== Notable contributions ==
- Sufficiently Breathless: Captain Beyond
- Jerry Jeff
- Pearls: Songs of Goffin and King
- Plain from the Heart
- Under the Double Ego
- Dreams: The Allman Brothers Band
- Read My Lips: Lou Ann Barton
- Antoine's Bringing You The Best of Blues
- Pride and Joy: Stevie Ray Vaughan
- Love and Danger: Joe Ely
- Colin James and the Little Big Band: Colin James
- Kickin' It Up: John Michael Montgomery
- Rendezvous: Lost Gonzo Band
- I Feel So Good: Tracy Nelson
- We All Get Lucky Sometimes: Lee Roy Parnell
- First Blood: Mike Henderson & The Bluebloods
- One of the Fortunate Few: Delbert McClinton
- The Nashville Sessions - Leftover Salmon:Leftover Salmon
- Highways and Heartaches: Wade Hayes
- The Almeria Club Recordings: Hank Williams
- Martin Scorsese Presents The Blues: Stevie Ray Vaughan
- Los Lonely Boys
- Dickey Betts & Great Southern/Atlanta's Burning Down
- Hillbilly Deluxe: Brooks & Dunn
- After Hours: Al Anderson
- KaBOOM: The Explosives
- Skin Deep: Buddy Guy
- Whitey Johnson: Gary Nicholson
- Flying Under the Radar: The Kentucky Headhunters
- Hell on Wheels: Jeffrey Steele
- Happy Songs from Rattlesnake Gulch: Joe Ely
- Power of Love: Trisha Yearwood
- God Don't Never Change: Ashley Cleaveland
- Pearl River: Mike Zito
- Ronnie Dunn: Ronnie Dunn
- Joe Louis Walker
- Here for the Party: Gretchen Wilson
- Tricks Up My Sleeves: Wayne Baker Brooks
- The Best!: Lou Ann Barton
- Hard Times in the Land of Plenty: Omar & The Howlers
- Stories from a Rock'n'Roll Heart: Lucinda Williams
- Breakthrough: Joe Bonamassa

== Equipment used ==
- Hammond B3 and Leslie 142
- Wurlitzer 200A
- Roland RD800
- Roland Juno 106
- Nord Stage 2
