= Bob Geddins =

American blues and R&B musician and record producer (1913–1991)

Robert L. Geddins (February 6, 1913 – February 16, 1991) was an American San Francisco Bay Area blues and rhythm and blues musician and record producer.

Geddins was born in Highbank, Texas, United States, a town ten miles south of Marlin, who came to Oakland, California during World War II, and worked there until his death of liver cancer in 1991, ten days after his 78th birthday.

== Record labels and artists produced ==
From 1948 onwards, he founded and owned numerous small independent record labels, including Art-Tone, Big Town, Cava-Tone, Down Town, Irma, Plaid, Rhythm, and Veltone. He also leased his recordings to Los Angeles based labels such as Swing Time, Aladdin, Modern, Imperial, the bay area Fantasy Records, and also to the Chicago operated Checker label. Geddins produced acts including Lowell Fulson, Jimmy McCracklin, Johnny Fuller, Sugar Pie DeSanto and Etta James. A 4-CD box set of a selected 107 original Geddins-produced recordings has been issued by JSP Records under the title The Bob Geddins Blues Legacy.

== Compositions ==
Many tunes often mistakenly attributed to other artists were either written or co-written by Geddins, e.g. "Tin Pan Alley", "Mercury Blues", and "My Time After A While".

Geddins's best-known tune is possibly "Haunted House" (originally produced by Geddins, sung by Johnny Fuller, released in 1958 on Specialty 655) which later became a 1964 US number 11 hit for Jumpin' Gene Simmons and No. 7 in Canada and, subsequently, many other well-known artists.
