= Joe Scott (musician) =

Joseph Wade Scott (December 2, 1924 – March 6, 1979) was an American R&B trumpeter, bandleader, songwriter, arranger, record producer and A&R man, best known for his work at Duke and Peacock Records in the 1950s and 1960s, notably with Bobby "Blue" Bland.

== Biography ==
Born in Texarkana, Texas, United States, he settled in Houston, Texas, by about 1950, becoming established as the principal bandleader, A&R man and arranger at Don Robey's Duke and Peacock Records. He wrote and arranged songs for Johnny Ace, Big Mama Thornton, Bobby Bland, and Junior Parker, as well as leading their touring bands. Among the songs that Scott wrote – although in most cases Robey claimed a co-writing credit with him, or in some cases sole credit (unassumingly) – were Bobby Bland's "Lead Me On", "Turn On Your Love Light" and "Ain't Nothing You Can Do"; Larry Davis' "Texas Flood"; Johnny Ace's "Never Let Me Go"; and Junior Parker's "Annie Get Your Yo-Yo".

Scott's arrangements featured extensive use of brass instruments, and "typified the Duke sound". According to Melvin Jackson, who also played in Bland's band, "Joe Scott was the man who created the big horn sound for blues bands."

He moved back to Los Angeles, California in the 1970s with his wife and children where he was originally raised after Texas. Scott died in Culver City, California, in March 1979, aged 54.
