= Double Trouble (band) =

American blues rock band

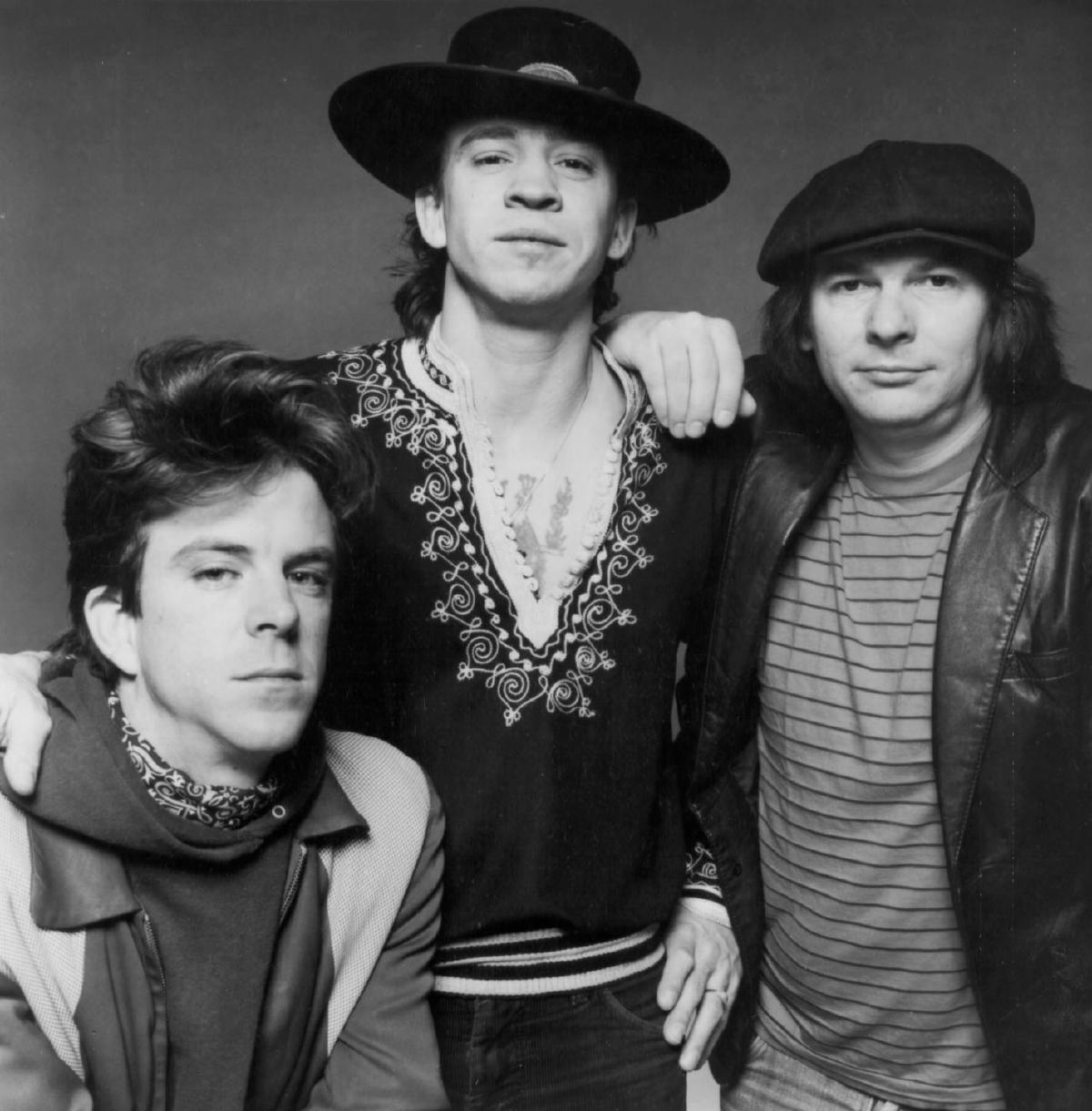
- Left to right: Chris Layton, Stevie Ray Vaughan, Tommy Shannon in 1983

Background information
- Origin: Austin, Texas, U.S.
- Genres: Texas blues; blues rock; electric blues; instrumental rock
- Years active: 1978–present
- Labels: Epic, Legacy, Sony, Tone-Cool
- Members: Chris Layton; Tommy Shannon
- Past members: Stevie Ray Vaughan; Lou Ann Barton; Johnny Reno; Fredde Walden; W. C. Clark; Mike Kindred; Jackie Newhouse; Jack Moore; Reese Wynans

Double Trouble is an American blues rock band from Austin, Texas, which served as the backing band for singer-guitarist Stevie Ray Vaughan. The group was active throughout the 1980s and contributed to reviving blues music, inspiring many later blues and rock acts. Formed in Austin, Texas in 1978, the group went through several early line-up changes before settling on a power trio consisting of Vaughan, Chris Layton (drums), and Tommy Shannon (bass). They became a four-piece by 1985 after adding Reese Wynans (keyboards). Whilst with Vaughan they were billed Stevie Ray Vaughan and Double Trouble. Rooted in blues and rock music, the group worked in various genres ranging from ballads to soul, often incorporating jazz and other musical elements.

Initially a five-piece lineup with Vaughan, Lou Ann Barton (vocals), Fredde Walden (drums), Jackie Newhouse (bass) and Johnny Reno (saxophone), they built their reputation playing clubs around Texas over a four-year period. Molded into a trio (Vaughan, Layton, Shannon), their musical potential was encouraged by producer John H. Hammond, who got the band a recording contract with Epic Records. They gained popularity after their debut album, Texas Flood, became a critical and commercial success in 1983. By the mid-1980s, they had become an international act, touring extensively around the world until August 1990, when Vaughan was killed in a helicopter crash after departing East Troy, Wisconsin.

Various posthumous releases featuring Vaughan have been issued since his death, overseen by his brother Jimmie. Since Vaughan's death, Double Trouble has continued in various capacities, releasing a studio album in 2001 and acting as a session band for blues and local Austin musicians. The band has sold over 11.5 million albums in the United States, receiving platinum certifications for all four of their studio albums featuring Vaughan. They have won four Grammy Awards including Best Contemporary Blues Performance for their album In Step (1989). Double Trouble were inducted alongside Vaughan into the Rock and Roll Hall of Fame in 2015.

== History ==
=== Formation and early years (1977–1982) ===
In September 1977, Stevie Ray Vaughan formed a revue-style group with several musicians from the Austin live music scene, including singer Lou Ann Barton, bassist W. C. Clark, keyboardist Mike Kindred, drummer Fredde "Pharaoh" Walden, and sax player Johnny Reno. They called themselves Triple Threat Revue, which was a nickname for Vaughan in reference to his multi-instrumental talent. By May 1978, Clark and Kindred had left the group; Vaughan changed the name to "Double Trouble", after an Otis Rush song of the same name, and a reference to both Vaughan and Barton. After Clark left to form his own band, Barton auditioned and hired Jackie Newhouse, who first met Barton in Fort Worth. In July, Walden was replaced by Jack Moore, a native of Providence, Rhode Island who moved to Austin to pursue drumming. After three months, Moore moved back to Providence to finish college, and was replaced by Chris Layton in September.

When Barton and Reno decided to leave the band in 1979, the group morphed into a power trio and Vaughan became the lead vocalist, and their name was changed to "Stevie Ray Vaughan and Double Trouble". In October 1980, during one of the band's frequent appearances at Rockefeller's in Houston, Vaughan jammed with Tommy Shannon, a former bassist for Johnny Winter, and was hired in January 1981. During the next year-and-a-half, the group gained popularity by performing in Texas clubs such as Fitzgerald's and Club Foot. They hired Chesley Millikin as their manager, who had been Epic Records' general manager in Europe, and ran Manor Downs, a horse racing track near Manor, Texas. The band performed at the racetrack the following year, which was filmed for a proposed television series, though it was not picked up by any major network.

In March 1982, producer Jerry Wexler recommended Vaughan and Double Trouble to perform at the Montreux Jazz Festival in Switzerland, after attending a performance in Austin. In July 1982, the band performed at the festival and were the first unsigned act to perform at the event. Despite boos from the audience, their performance caught the attention of David Bowie and Jackson Browne, the latter who offered the group free use of his recording studio in Los Angeles. Layton recalls: "He goes, 'I have a studio in Los Angeles. I keep it for my pre-production work and have loaned it out to a number of people for special projects. If you guys are ever in Los Angeles and you want to use it, just let me know in advance and it's yours.'"

=== Texas Flood and Couldn't Stand the Weather (1983–1984) ===
After recording at Browne's studio in November 1982 that yielded the release of Texas Flood, producer John H. Hammond signed the band to Epic Records in March 1983. Released in June, Texas Flood peaked at #38 on the Billboard 200 and initially sold over half a million copies. The band toured North America in the first half of the year, followed by a two-week European tour in August–September. Returning to the US, they opened for The Moody Blues, receiving $5000 per show plus bonuses for successful ticket sales. They gave their first live television performance in December on Austin City Limits, broadcast in February 1984.

Couldn't Stand the Weather, the band's second studio album, saw an outpacing of sales to Texas Flood. Recorded in January 1984, the album included musicians such as Fabulous Thunderbirds' members Jimmie Vaughan and Fran Christina, as well as saxophonist Stan Harrison, who performed on "Stang's Swang". Following the album's release in May 1984, the group toured internationally, staging concerts in Scandinavia, Germany, Australia, and New Zealand. Acknowledging the challenge posed by constant international touring to his marriage, Vaughan admitted, "The hard part is that I don't get to see my wife very often, but if she comes out on the road it's harder because she's not used to it. If you're not used to it, it only takes two or three days and then you start getting on each other's nerves, and that's worse." On October 4, 1984, the group performed at Carnegie Hall in celebration of Vaughan's thirtieth birthday, featuring many special guests such as the Roomful of Blues horn section, Dr. John, Jimmie Vaughan, Angela Strehli, and George Rains, and was met with positive reception. The band's first Australia visit, in October–November, included two sold-out shows at the Sydney Opera House.

=== Soul to Soul, substance abuse, and rehabilitation (1985–1988) ===
The band's desire to experiment grew as they recorded Soul to Soul, beginning in March 1985. Vaughan recalled using two wah-wah pedals for "Say What!", sitting on a stool and working them separately. Parts of the album featured work by Joe Sublett, Doyle Bramhall and Reese Wynans, who was hired as the band's keyboardist. The group's cocaine use increased however, especially Vaughan's, as witnessed by Bramhall, who recalled seeing "mounds of cocaine on top of the organ". He said of Vaughan's cocaine use: "Where I was doing a lot, Stevie was doing five times, ten times more than I was doing." Nearly 800 minutes of the studio recordings were devoted to the sessions and leaked into the collector's market. Released in September, Soul to Soul received mixed reviews from critics. Allmusic's Stephen Thomas Erlewine commented, "For all of its positive attributes, Soul to Soul winds up being less than the sum of its parts, and it's hard to pinpoint an exact reason why. Perhaps it was because Vaughan was on the verge of a horrible battle with substance abuse at the time of recording or perhaps it just has that unevenness inherent in transitional albums."

In July 1986, the band recorded three shows in Austin and Dallas for a live album, later released as Live Alive. One month later, Vaughan learned that his father was hospitalized for an illness, and flew to his hometown of Dallas to be with his family; his father died three days later from complications associated with asbestos. After attending the funeral, Vaughan immediately flew to Montreal for a performance in Jarry Park, which was reportedly the highest paying show for the band at the time. A fan recalls the Montreal concert: "He played for a solid two hours and never said a word to the crowd until he came back for an encore and said, 'This one's for you, daddy.' I was in the front row that night, and many times during the set he was crying while playing. I will never forget that performance."

During a tour of Europe a month later, Vaughan was hospitalized in Ludwigshafen for near-death dehydration from years of alcohol and substance abuse. After two weeks of treatment in London, he checked into Peachford Hospital in Atlanta and spent a month in rehabilitation, emerging fully recovered and healthy; he would often attend local Alcoholics Anonymous (AA) meetings on tour. Vaughan rejoined with Double Trouble to tour in support of Live Alive for the next two years, visiting countries such as England, Italy, and Germany. The band also performed at the inaugural party for President George H. W. Bush in Washington, D.C.

=== In Step, final tour, and Vaughan's death (1989–1990) ===
Vaughan and Double Trouble chose Jim Gaines, who worked with the band for the recording of Soul to Soul, to produce their next studio album. The group recorded at Sound Castle and Summa Studios in Los Angeles, as well as Kiva Studios in Memphis. Although the sessions were completed in about four months, they were productive and mixed within two weeks. In Step debuted at number 33 on the Billboard 200 album chart in June 1989. Allmusic's Stephen Thomas Erlewine wrote in his review of the album, "The magnificent thing about In Step is how it's fully realized, presenting every facet of Vaughan's musical personality, yet it still soars with a sense of discovery." In Step went on to sell over two million copies in the United States and 50,000 in Canada. That October, Vaughan and Double Trouble embarked on a North American arena tour for 34 shows, dubbed "The Fire Meets the Fury". For the tour, the band added Jeff Beck as a co-headliner. The shows would often close with a rendition of "Going Down" by Freddie King.

In August 1990, subsequent to a summer tour with Joe Cocker, the band co-headlined two shows with Eric Clapton at Alpine Valley Music Theatre in East Troy, Wisconsin. Following the final performance on August 26, Vaughan chartered a helicopter to take him to Chicago. He, along with the pilot and three members of Clapton's tour crew (agent Bobby Brooks, bodyguard Nigel Browne, and assistant tour manager Colin Smythe), were killed when their helicopter crashed into the side of a ski hill soon after taking off from a nearby golf course in the early morning hours of August 27. Brother Jimmie Vaughan recalled that Vaughan was in a hurry to get back to Chicago:

I remember Stevie says, 'Well, I need to go back; do you mind?' I think I said something like, 'Yeah, I mind; I came all the way here to see you and we have to talk, and you shouldn't run off,' or something like that. Not thinking about it, really; you know, you just say stuff. And so he looked right at me and he said, 'No, you don't understand—I've got to go.' And then he got on the helicopter.

Vaughan's funeral was held on August 30, 1990, at Laurel Land Cemetery in Dallas. The service was opened by the Reverend Barry Bailey of the United Methodist Church in Fort Worth, who was Vaughan's AA sponsor. The pallbearers included band members Shannon and Layton, as well as the group's manager and Vaughan's guitar technician.

=== Double Trouble after Vaughan (1990–present) ===
Layton and Shannon then helped form two "semi-supergroups" in Austin, Arc Angels and Storyville in the 1990s, and worked with W. C. Clark, Kenny Wayne Shepherd, and Doyle Bramhall. In 2001, they released a new studio album as Double Trouble, entitled Been a Long Time, on Tone-Cool Records. This album featured appearances from Doyle Bramhall II, Lou Ann Barton, Reese Wynans, Jonny Lang, Willie Nelson, Dr. John, Susan Tedeschi, and Jimmie Vaughan. The album hit #1 on the U.S. Blues charts and peaked at #126 on the Billboard 200.

Double Trouble later worked as the rhythm section for Jimmy D. Lane and play on his album, It's Time (2004). They also play on two albums by Brazilian blues guitarist Nuno Mindelis, and toured with Joe Bonamassa later in the 2000s.

In 2015, Double Trouble with Vaughan were inducted into the Rock and Roll Hall of Fame.

In 2019, Double Trouble, along with Reese Wynans, Kenny Wayne Shepherd, and others, recorded the album Sweet Release, featuring many songs from Double Trouble's mainstream career. The album was released on March 1, 2019.

== Members ==
Current

- Chris "Whipper" Layton – drums (1978–present)
- Tommy Shannon – bass (1981–present)

Former

- Stevie Ray Vaughan – guitar, vocals (1978–1990; his death)
- Lou Ann Barton – vocals (1978–1979)
- W.C. Clark – bass (1978)
- Mike Kindred – keyboards (1978)
- Johnny Reno – saxophone (1978–1979)
- Fredde "Pharaoh" Walden – drums (1978)
- Jackie Newhouse – bass (1978–1980)
- Jack Moore – drums (1978)
- Reese Wynans – keyboards (1985–1990)

== Discography ==
=== with Stevie Ray Vaughan ===
see: Stevie Ray Vaughan discography

- Texas Flood (1983)
- Couldn't Stand The Weather (1984)
- Soul to Soul (1985)
- In Step (1989)
- The Sky Is Crying (1991)
- In the Beginning (1992)

=== Without Vaughan ===
- Texas Bound (with Nuno Mindelis) (1996)
- Been a Long Time (2001)
- It's Time (with Jimmy D. Lane) (2004)
- "Derek Miller With Double Trouble" (with Derek Miller)
- Sweet Release (with Reese Wynans) (2019)

== See also ==
- 1980s in music
- Music of Austin
- Music of Texas
- Stevie Ray Vaughan and Double Trouble live performances
