= Doyle Bramhall =

American musician (1949–2011)

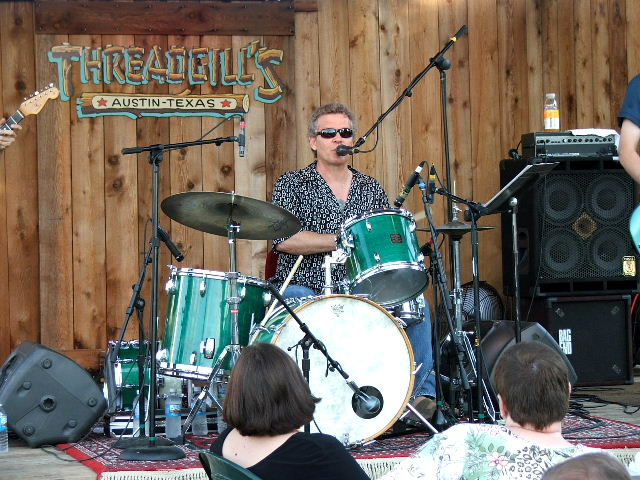
- Bramhall performing at Threadgill's in Austin, Texas

Background information
- Born: February 17, 1949
- Origin: Dallas, Texas, U.S.
- Died: November 12, 2011 (aged 62) Alpine, Texas, U.S.
- Genres: Blues, R&B
- Occupations: Musician, composer
- Instruments: Vocals, drums, guitar
- Years active: 1968–2011
- Labels: Yep Roc Records

Doyle Bramhall Sr. (February 17, 1949 – November 12, 2011) was an American blues singer, guitarist and drummer with deep roots in the Austin, Texas music scene.

== Career ==
Bramhall joined The Chessmen with Jimmie Vaughan while in high school. The group opened for Jimi Hendrix when he played Dallas. In 1969, he moved to Austin and formed Texas Storm with Jimmie Vaughan. In the 1970s, Bramhall formed The Nightcrawlers with Marc Benno, which also included Jimmie Vaughan's younger brother Stevie Ray Vaughan on guitar. While in The Nightcrawlers, Bramhall co-wrote the tune "Dirty Pool," which appeared on Stevie Ray Vaughan's debut album, Texas Flood. He would write or co-write several other songs for the younger Vaughan, such as "Life by the Drop" from SRV's The Sky Is Crying album, and he played the drums on the Vaughan Brothers only album, Family Style.

Bramhall released his debut solo record in 1994, which included appearances from the Vaughans, Mike Judge and his own son. He also collaborated with Jennifer Warnes in the 1990s. As a producer he won a 2002 WC Handy Blues award for Marcia Ball's album Presumed Innocent.

He is the father of singer and guitarist Doyle Bramhall II by his first wife.

=== Death ===
On November 12, 2011, Bramhall died of heart failure while asleep at his home in Alpine, Texas. He was 62. It was reported that Bramhall had been suffering from pneumonia in the days immediately preceding his death.

== Discography ==
- Groovin' with Big D – Kathy & the Kilowatts (Lectro-Fine Records, 1991)
- Bird Nest on the Ground (Antone's, 1994)
- Fitchburg Street (Yep Roc, 2003) U.S. Billboard Top Blues Albums No. 6
- Is It News (Yep Roc, 2007) U.S. Top Blues Albums No. 7
- “Let That Right Hand Go” Featuring Smokin’ Joe Kubek – Smokin’ Joe Kubek (Bird Records Texas, 2012)

== See also ==
- List of Texas blues musicians
- List of electric blues musicians
