= Tommy Shannon =

American bass guitarist (born 1946)

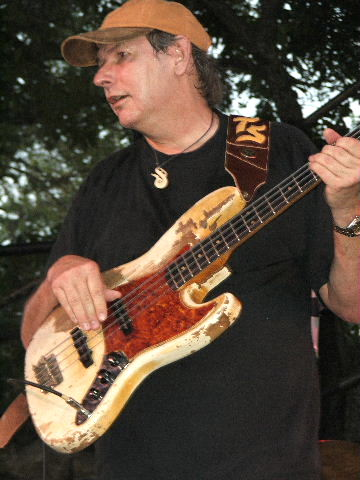
- Tommy Shannon performing on stage in 2006

Background information
- Born: Thomas Lafitte Smedley; April 18, 1946 (age 80); Tucson, Arizona, United States
- Genres: Blues rock, Texas blues
- Occupation: Musician
- Instruments: Bass, guitar
- Years active: 1962–present
- Labels: Epic, Legacy, Sony, Geffen, Atlantic

Tommy Shannon (born Thomas Lafitte Smedley; April 18, 1946) is an American bass guitarist, who is best known as a member of Double Trouble, a blues rock band led by Stevie Ray Vaughan. Born in Tucson, Arizona, Shannon moved to Dumas, Texas when he was nine, where he originally started as a guitarist, though he started playing bass at the age of 21. He appeared with Johnny Winter at Woodstock in 1969. He later joined Double Trouble in 1981 and became a permanent member of Double Trouble until Vaughan's death in 1990. Shannon and bandmate Chris Layton later formed supergroups such as the Arc Angels.

== Early life ==
Shannon was born in Tucson, Arizona, and moved to the Texas Panhandle when he was nine. He grew up mainly in Dumas, Texas, north of Amarillo on Highway 287. Shannon joined his first band, The Avengers, around age 13. The band members were Shannon (guitar), Tim Easley (vocals), Jim Love (guitar) and David Davis (drums).

In high school, Shannon was in the band Ekos. Soon after high school, he moved to Dallas and joined a soul cover band in 1966. The cover band was initially called The New Breed, and later changed its name to The Young Lads. Shannon recorded two 45s with this band, which featured Tim Easly on vocals and Uncle John Turner on drums.

== Music career ==
=== Early career ===
Shannon had the first of two important meetings at The Fog in Dallas in the late 1960s. There he first saw Johnny Winter. Shannon ended up backing Winter, and with "Uncle" John Turner the three musicians formed a project known as The Progressive Blues Experiment in 1968. They cut one album for Sonobeat Records titled The Progressive Blues Experiment before being signed to Columbia Records by Clive Davis for $600,000 in 1969. Shannon appeared on both of these Columbia LPs, each released 1969; Johnny Winter (self-titled), and Second Winter. At Woodstock, Johnny's brother Edgar joined them onstage. Johnny Winter ended up moving to a band featuring Rick Derringer in early 1970 that already had a rhythm section, and there was no room for Shannon or Turner. They landed in a San Francisco band called Krackerjack that comprised Uncle John Turner, drums; Mike Kindred, piano; Shannon, bass; Bruce Bowland, vocals; and John Staehely, guitar. Jesse "Guitar" Taylor played lead guitar with the band as well for a time during 1970 (there is a band photo as proof). According to Tommy's website, Stevie Ray Vaughan, known as "Skeeter," was part of this band in its later Austin incarnation, along with Robin Syler on guitar. Among other personnel changes, Shannon eventually left the group and was replaced by Dwight Davis. Krackerjack remained a group from 1970 to 1973.

During the 1970s, Shannon became involved with drugs, and began a cycle of jail, probation and rehab that would last for some time. He played with the Austin band The Fools briefly. Due to recurring drug arrests and failure of rehab in San Antonio and other locations, Shannon was finally sent to a "farm" in Buda and, as a result of his probation on release, he was not allowed to join any bands because of the pervasiveness of drugs in the music scene. Shannon became a bricklayer for a few years until he was eventually able to return to music in 1977. He played in a few unknown bands, then received a call from Rocky Hill, brother of ZZ Top's Dusty Hill. He moved to Houston to play with Hill and Uncle John, and in the late 1970s went on to play with Alan Haynes in the "Texas Boogie Band" (Shannon later played on Haynes' well received 1994 release, "Wishing Well"). Shannon also toured, opening for Bachman–Turner Overdrive and for Kiss at the Warehouse in New Orleans.

=== With Stevie Ray Vaughan ===
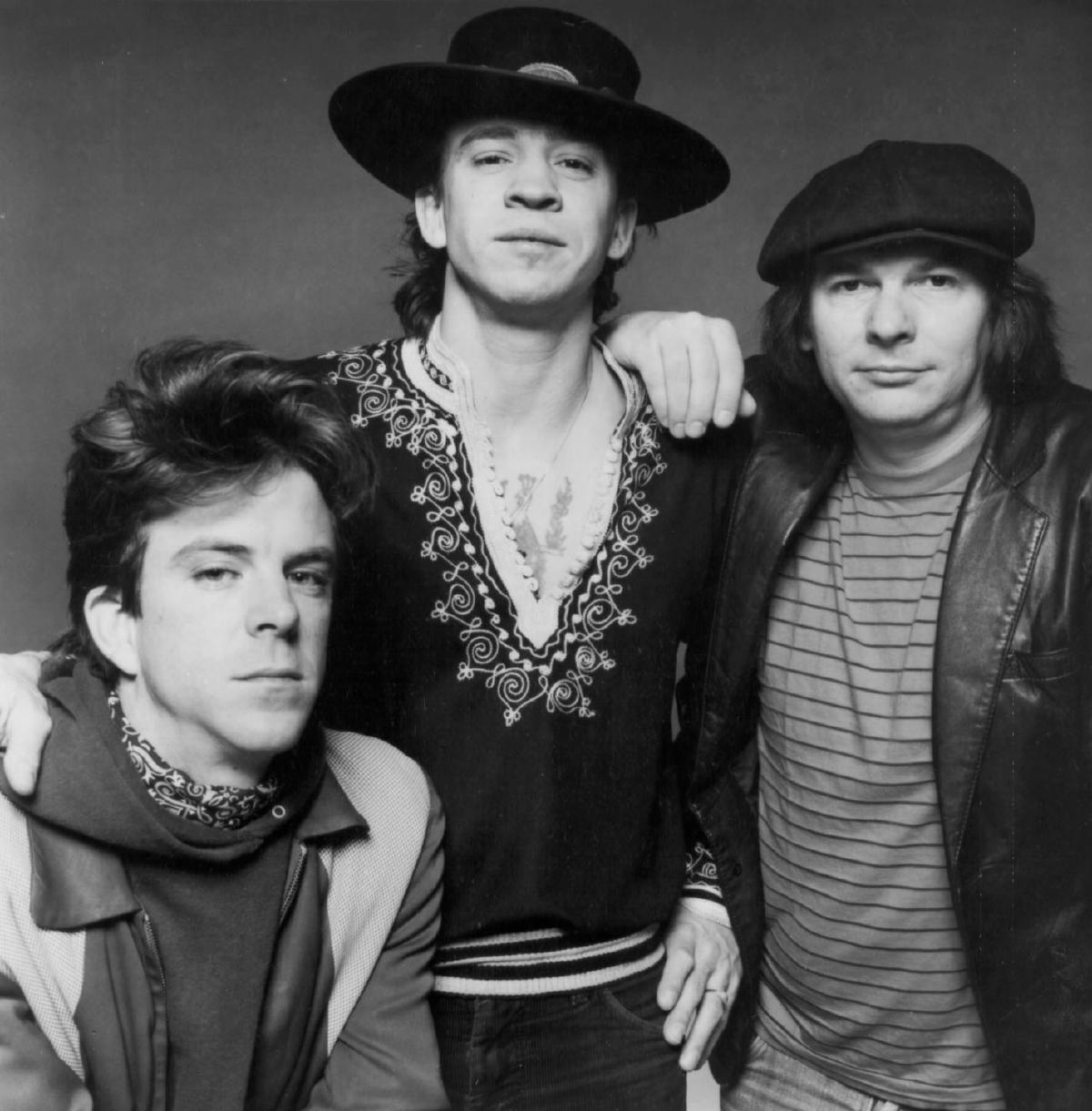
Stevie Ray Vaughan and Double Trouble (Shannon at right) in 1983.

Shannon moved between Dallas and Austin, and saw Stevie Ray Vaughan at The Fog with Vaughan's group Blackbird. Vaughan later formed a group called Double Trouble, and in 1980 Shannon wound up taking the place of the bass player, Jackie Newhouse, after seeing Double Trouble at Rockefellers in Houston. Vaughan was tapped to do some guitar tracks for David Bowie (including guitar on "Let's Dance"), and was then offered the chance to tour with Bowie, putting the new group's future in doubt. Ultimately, though, Vaughan's manager turned down the offer. Vaughan, Shannon and drummer Chris Layton would stay together as Stevie Ray Vaughan & Double Trouble.

After joining Double Trouble, Shannon met his future wife Kumi and they eventually married in 1986. His drug-use returned, and in increasing volumes, often with the band leader, Vaughan. Eventually both realized a need to change that lifestyle, and both checked into rehabilitation in separate cities, becoming clean and sober. The newly healthy band was on the upswing, making popular music and gaining wider fame, until the helicopter carrying Vaughan crashed into a hillside after a show at Alpine Valley Music Theater, near East Troy, Wisconsin, on August 27, 1990, killing all aboard.

=== Later career ===
After a period of mourning, Shannon's musical career eventually continued. He played with Doyle Bramhall, Denny Freeman and Chris Layton in The Mighty Zor. Shannon was asked by The Rolling Stones to audition to replace Bill Wyman, but did not get the role. Other notable projects included the Arc Angels with Doyle Bramhall II and Charlie Sexton, and Storyville with Malford Milligan. He toured with Susan Tedeschi and, along with Chris Layton, toured and recorded with Kenny Wayne Shepherd. He and Layton played on Jimmy D. Lane's It's Time. He has played with other notable musicians, including Eric Clapton, The Rolling Stones, Little Richard, Hubert Sumlin, Mike McCready, Jonny Lang, Buddy Guy, Jimmie Vaughan, Eric Johnson, David Grissom, Mato Nanji, Jeff Beck, Lou Gramm and John Mayer.

In 1999, Shannon, in company with Chris Layton, provided the rhythm section for the Debbie Davies release Tales From the Austin Motel on Shanachie Records.

In 2001, Double Trouble reformed, releasing their only album to date without Vaughan. Titled Been a Long Time, it featured many guest performers (including Tedeschi) filling Vaughan's frontman role.

His primary bass was a battered Arctic White 1962 Fender Jazz Bass with a red tortoise shell pickguard. Both Jimi Hendrix and BB King jammed on this bass with Johnny Winter on guitar, as documented in photos. He has been seen playing Yamaha BBs, Music Man StingRays, other Fender Precision and Jazz basses (mostly American, American Deluxe and Custom Shop models) and custom Fodera basses.

== Awards ==
Shannon was inducted into the Rock and Roll Hall of Fame as a member of Double Trouble in 2015.
