= Latte (disambiguation) =

Latte is a coffee drink with steamed milk.

Latte may also refer to:

- Latte macchiato, another coffee drink
- Latte stone, an ancient Chamorro building support
- Wey Latte, a 2021 Chinese compact luxury crossover SUV
- Latte (graphics chip), the Nintendo Wii U's GPU

== People with the name Latte ==
- Kurt Latte (1891–1964), German classicist and philologist
- Emmanuel Latte Lath (born 1999), Ivorian footballer

== See also ==
- Lattes (disambiguation)
- Late (disambiguation)
- LATT (disambiguation)
- LAT (disambiguation)
- Later (disambiguation)
- LART
