= Lat =

Lat or LAT may refer to:

== Biology and medicine ==
- Linker of activated T cells (LAT), a human gene and T-cell signalling protein
- Large neutral amino acid transporter (LAT1), a membrane transport protein
- HHV Latency Associated Transcript (HHV LAT), latent RNA from herpes simplex virus
- Latissimus dorsi muscles, of the back (colloquially lats)

== Maps ==
- Latitude, a geo-coodinate
- Lowest astronomical tide, a nautical chart datum

== Media ==
- Los Angeles Times, an American newspaper
- LAT TV, Texas and Arizona, US

== People ==
- Lat (cartoonist) (born 1951), Malaysian comics creator
- Lat Mayen (born 1998), South Sudanese-Australian basketball player
- David Lat (born 1975), American lawyer and blogger

== Places in Iran ==
- Lat, Fuman, Gilan
- Lat, Khomam, Gilan
- Lat, Mazandaran
- Lat, Qazvin
- Lat-e Disar, Mazandaran

== Technology and mathematics ==
- Large Area Telescope, aboard the FGST
- Local Area Transport, in computer networking
- Linear approximation table, in cryptanalysis and logic
- .lat, an internet top-level domain introduced in 2015

== Other uses ==
- Al-Lat, a pre-Islamic Arabian goddess
- Lam Tin station, Hong Kong (MTR code:LAT)
- Latin, a classical language (ISO 639-2/3:lat)
- Latvia at the Olympics (IOC code:LAT)
- Living apart together, couples who reside separately

== See also ==
- Lat. (disambiguation)
- Lats (disambiguation)
- Late (disambiguation)
- Lath (disambiguation)
- LATT (disambiguation)
- Lata (disambiguation)
- LART, a 2000 computer
