= See You Soon (disambiguation) =

See You Soon is a 2019 romance film.

See You Soon may also refer to:

== Songs ==
- "See You Soon", by Coldplay from The Blue Room, 1999
- "See You Soon", by Beabadoobee from Beatopia, 2022
- "See You Soon", by Mimi Webb from Amelia, 2023

== See also ==
- See You (disambiguation)
- See You Again (disambiguation)
- See You Later (disambiguation)
