= Fior di latte =

Fior di latte may refer to:

- Mozzarella made from cow rather than buffalo milk
- A popular gelato type with no flavor added
- "Fior di Latte" (song), a 2017 song by Phoenix off the album Ti Amo
- "Fior Di Latte", a chapter of the serialized Japanese manga comic Agravity Boys

== See also ==
- Latte (disambiguation)
- Fior (disambiguation)
