= Henri Coutard =

French radiation therapist

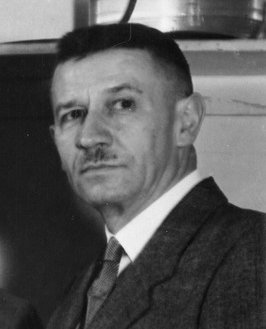
- Coutard in 1937
- Born: 27 August 1876; Marolles-les-Braults, Sarthe, France
- Died: 16 March 1950 (aged 73); Le Mans, Sarthe, France
- Education: University of Paris
- Known for: Advances in radiation therapy

Henri Coutard (Note: Also spelled as Henry Coutard.) (27 August 1876 – 16 March 1950) was a French radiation therapist. He is known for his studies of radiation therapy for the treatment of laryngeal cancer and the development of the "protracted-fractional method" of radiation dosing.

Born in Marolles-les-Braults in the French department of Sarthe, Coutard attended medical school at University of Paris and graduated in 1902. He served in the French Army and lived for several years in the Jura Mountains before returning to Paris to study the medical applications of radium. During World War I, he worked in one of the radiological ambulance units overseen by the Polish-French physicist and chemist Marie Curie. He became the chief of the X-ray department at the Radium Institute of the University of Paris in 1919, working closely with Claudius Regaud and other scientists. Coutard's early work demonstrating the efficacy of radiating patients with laryngeal cancer led to the adoption of radiation therapy as a primary course of cancer treatment. The protracted-fractional method consisted of long durations of radiation applied over several weeks.

In the late 1930s, Coutard moved to the United States, first working at the California Institute of Technology and then at the Chicago Tumor Institute. During this time, he accompanied the American entrepreneur Spencer Penrose to Colorado Springs to treat Penrose's esophageal cancer. After Penrose's death in 1939, his radiotherapy equipment was donated to Penrose Hospital and Coutard became a radiotherapist at the newly established Penrose Tumor Clinic. In the last decade of his life, Coutard's research became more erratic. He published a monograph in 1949 that was largely ignored by reputable journals and his peers. He experienced an intracerebral hemorrhage in December 1949 and died in Le Mans a few months later.

== Early life and education ==
Henri Coutard was born on 27 August 1876 in Marolles-les-Braults in the French department of Sarthe. His father, Louis Coutard, was a local government official, and his mother, Mélanie Marie Joséphine Coutard (née Ragot), sold novelty items. He had an older brother, Louis, and a younger sister, Helène.

In 1887, Coutard enrolled at the Lycée Montesquieu, a state boarding school in Le Mans. He received a baccalauréat in literature in 1893 and another in mathematics the following year. During this time, he also received an award for excellence in his school's military and gymnastics programs. After secondary school, he entered medical school at the University of Paris, training in Parisian hospitals and completing an internship in Nantes. His doctoral thesis was titled Lesions extrapéritonéales de la vessie et du rectum dans les fractures du bassin ("Extraperitoneal lesions of the bladder and rectum observed in cases of pelvic fracture"). It summarised eight cases from the literature and one from his previous patients. He defended his thesis on 17 July 1902.

== Career ==
=== Military service and interest in radium ===
After medical school, Coutard enrolled as a medical officer and captain in the Chasseurs Alpins, the elite mountain infantry force of the French Army. After contracting pulmonary tuberculosis he moved to the Jura Mountains to recover, and during that time practiced general medicine. In 1912, he returned to Paris after becoming interested in the potential medical applications of radioactivity. Radioactivity had first been discovered in the element uranium by the physicist Henri Becquerel in 1896, and over the next several years, the French researchers Marie and Pierre Curie discovered the radioactivity of additional elements: thorium, polonium, and radium. Coutard began studying the properties of radium at an experimental laboratory co-founded by the physicist Jacques Danne. His research centred on therapeutic applications of radium in animals, and he presented his work at the 1912 meeting of the French Association for the Advancement of Science.

Coutard was drafted during World War I and worked as a radiation therapist in a military hospital near Baccarat, Meurthe-et-Moselle, on the Eastern Front. There, he met Claudius Regaud, a radiobiologist with whom he later collaborated. Coutard also worked in one of the radiological ambulance units overseen by Marie Curie. He attained the rank of major by the end of the war.

=== Radium Institute ===
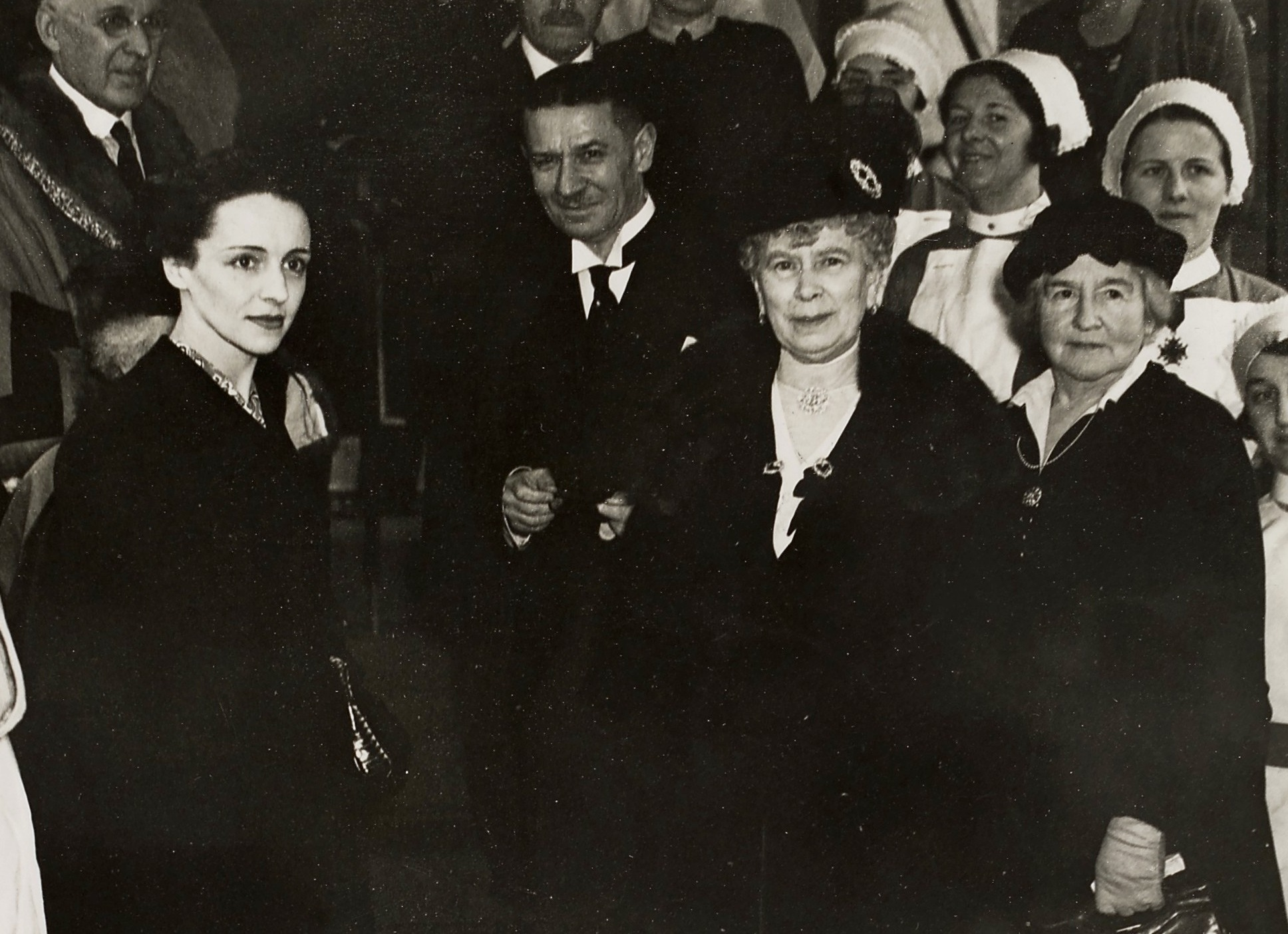
Ève Curie, Coutard, Queen Mary of Teck, and the Viscountess Runciman in 1937

In 1919, Coutard became the chief of the X-ray department at the Radium Institute of the University of Paris, working with other scientists including Regaud and Antoine Lacassagne. Using a single X-ray unit in the basement of the institute, he conducted experiments on animals, administered radiation therapy to patients, and performed diagnostic imaging of the pharynx and larynx. In his early work during this period, he observed the recurrence of cancer when tumours were insufficiently irradiated and the need to avoid excessive irradiation of the eyes. He believed that the dose of radiation needed to be high enough to cause an observable reaction in the mucous membrane, and coined the term radioepithelitis to describe this reaction. At the 1921 International Congress of Oto-Rhino-Laryngology in Paris, Coutard presented data from six patients with laryngeal cancer who he had treated with radiation. His work was well received, and physicians began adopting radiation therapy as a primary course of treatment for cancer.

Scientists had differing opinions on the optimal timing of radiation doses. Coutard believed that long durations of radiation, applied over several weeks, produced the best results and theorised that this technique allowed tissue to recover between sessions. He presented his method at the 1928 International Congress of Radiology, and it became known as "Coutard's method" or the "protracted-fractional method". Using this technique, Coutard achieved the first reported cures of laryngeal cancer using radiation, and by about 1930 he had obtained data on the five-year survival rate of his technique. Though he never published rigid standards for radiation doses, he meticulously recorded the treatments that he administered to each patient, using a radiometer that he constructed. Over the next decade, he continued experimenting with different therapy regimens, including short, intensive doses and interrupted regimens. Radiotherapists from other countries visited the Radium Institute to meet Coutard and train with him, including Simeon T. Cantril, who later became the first president of the American Society for Radiation Oncology.

=== Caltech and the Chicago Tumor Institute ===
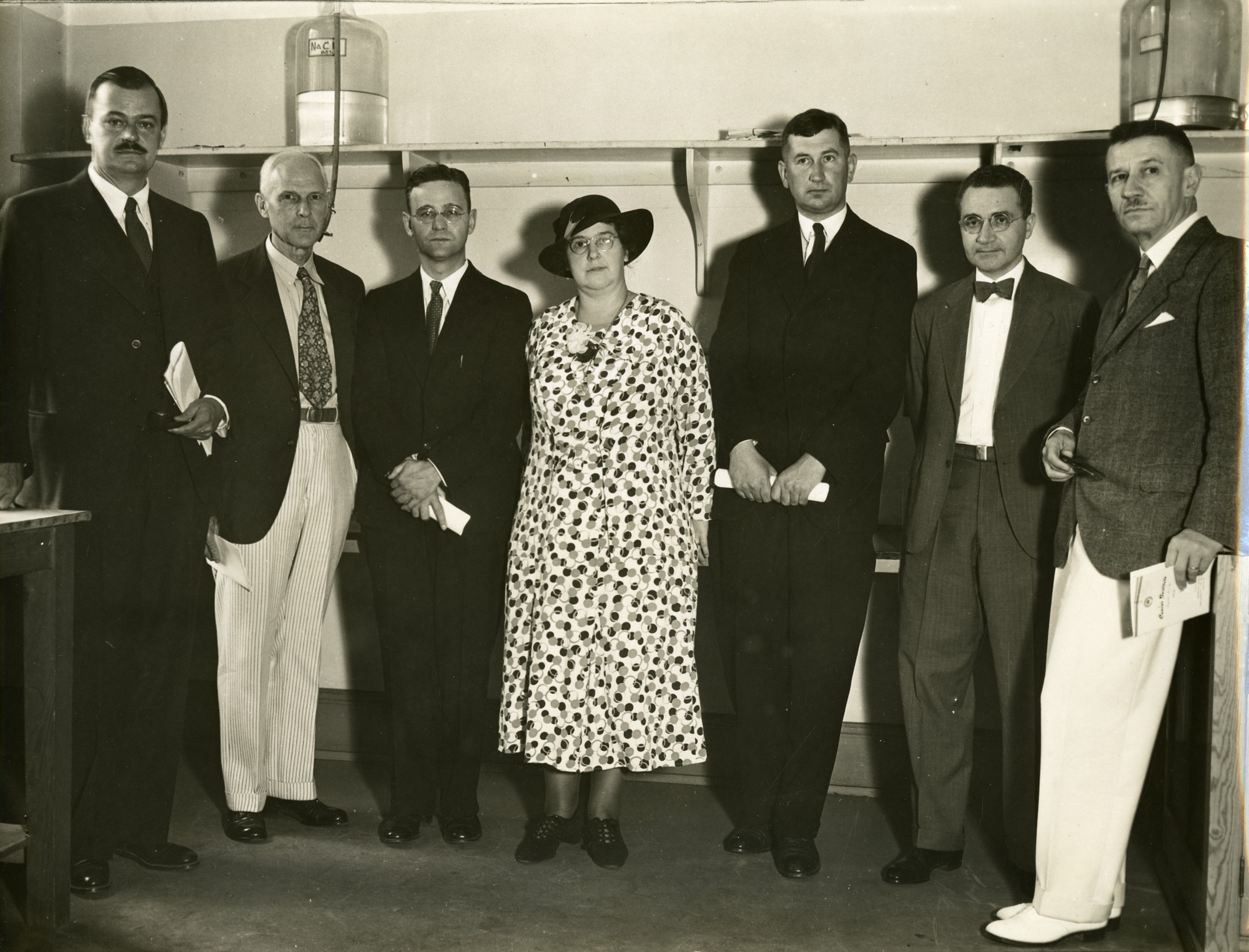
Coutard (pictured far right) in 1937 with other leading cancer researchers

Coutard grew interested in United States radiotherapy research, where supervoltage units (X-ray generators with a peak kilovoltage of several hundred kilovolts) were being produced. The physicist Charles Christian Lauritsen, on behalf of his mentor Robert Andrews Millikan, invited Coutard to work at the Kellogg Research Laboratory at the California Institute of Technology. At the same time, Max Cutler of the Chicago Tumor Institute offered Coutard a leading position there. Coutard accepted both offers in late 1937. He resigned his position at the Radium Institute and was succeeded by François Baclesse. At Caltech, he studied high-voltage therapy and worked closely with Millikan and the physicist Seeley G. Mudd.

After working at Caltech for six months, Coutard moved to Chicago and studied the use of short, concentrated doses of radiation for treating laryngeal cancer at the Chicago Tumor Institute, while teaching graduate courses there. Cutler's ambitions for the institute were curtailed as a result of the Great Depression. He was unable to secure a supervoltage unit for Coutard, and the institute did not receive many patients. During this time, Coutard treated the American entrepreneur and philanthropist Spencer Penrose for esophageal cancer, having previously treated Penrose for laryngopharyngeal cancer in Paris in 1932. Penrose bought a radiotherapy unit for his home in Colorado Springs, Colorado, and Coutard accompanied him there to continue his treatment.

=== Penrose Tumor Clinic and decline ===
Penrose died in 1939, and stipulated that his radiotherapy equipment be donated to the local Glockner Hospital (now Penrose Hospital). His wife, Julie Penrose, used funds from their El Pomar Foundation to establish the Penrose Tumor Clinic at the hospital and invited Coutard to practice radiotherapy at the new clinic. He accepted, and moved to Colorado Springs in 1941.

In the last decade of his life, Coutard's research became more erratic. He began to conduct unorthodox experiments, including the use of blocks of gold as X-ray filters and homeopathic theories of beta particles, and stopped publishing papers in scientific journals. His ideas were criticised by his peers and he became increasingly isolated.

Coutard published a monograph in 1949, reporting on his findings from Colorado Springs. According to the radiologist and historian E. R. N. Grigg, the monograph was a "rambling mixture of clinical observations, working hypotheses, and fantastic assumptions"; it was largely ignored by reputable journals as well as his peers.

== Personal life ==
Coutard married Anne-Marie Adèle Rougier in Paris on 25 March 1919, at the end of World War I. During his time at the Radium Institute, they lived on the outskirts of Paris. Anne-Marie remained in Paris when Henri worked in the United States, and she died of leukemia there in 1940. After her death, Coutard married Suzanne Rosalie Jourgeon (née Mathot), the widow of one of his former patients in France. She moved to Colorado Springs and they lived within walking distance of the Penrose Tumor Clinic. When Suzanne's health deteriorated in 1949, she moved back to Paris to live with her children from her first marriage; she died there later that year.

== Death and legacy ==
In late 1949 Coutard traveled to the Radium Station of Copenhagen, where the director, Jens Nielsen, was one of his few remaining followers. He experienced an intracerebral hemorrhage on a trip to France to visit his sister's family in December 1949. After several months of illness, Coutard died at his sister's home in Le Mans on 16 March 1950.

While Coutard's experiments in final years were considered unorthodox by his peers, his earlier contributions helped radiation therapy become an established treatment for people with cancer. Grigg described Coutard's most important contribution as "teaching a generation of radiologists to observe their patients carefully and to record painstakingly the clinical course of treatment". Coutard's protracted-fractional method laid the groundwork for modern dose fractionation methods, and he is also remembered for being the first to present results on X-ray imaging of the larynx. During his lifetime, he published about 35 papers in addition to his 1949 monograph. His hometown, Marolles-les-Braults, later named a square near the center of the town after him.
