= Lath (disambiguation) =

A lath is a backing material for plaster that is applied to a wood or metal framework as matrix over which stucco or plaster is applied.

Lath may also refer to:

- Lath, Rajkot, an Indian village
- Lath (horse), a British racehorse
- Lath Branch, a stream in Kansas
- Lath, early alternative name of the Brahmi script as used in the Edicts of Ashoka

== People with the surname ==
- Melagne Lath (born 1963), Ivorian sprint canoeist
- Mukund Lath (1937–2020), Indian scholar and cultural historian
- Surendra Lath (b. 1949), Indian politician

== See also ==
- Lathe, a machine tool
- Lat (disambiguation)
