= Lattes =

Lattes may refer to:

- Lattes, Hérault, a commune in southern France
  - Canton of Lattes
- the plural of "latte":
  - Latte, a type of coffee drink
  - Latte stone, traditionally used in the Marianas
- Lattes Platform, the Brazilian Government information system on science and technology

== People with the name ==
- César Lattes (1924–2005), Brazilian physicist
- Franco Lattes (1917–1994), Italian writer
- Isaac Lattes (14th-century), a rabbi who lived in Provence
- Marcel Lattès (1886–1943), French composer
- Samuel Lattès (1873–1918), French mathematician

== See also ==
- JC Lattès, a French publishing house
- Lattès map, in mathematics
- Latte (disambiguation)
