= CyA =

CYA or CyA can refer to:

- CyA, a South Korean musician now known by his birth name Giuk
- Cyclosporin A, a chemical compound
- Czapek yeast agar, a cell culture medium
- Cover your ass, a defensive practice against legal penalties or criticism

== See also ==
- CYA (disambiguation)
