= Sooner (disambiguation) =

Sooner or Sooners may refer to:

- Sooners, early Oklahoma, US settlers
  - Oklahoma Sooners, University of Oklahoma varsity sports teams named after the early settlers
- Ottawa Sooners, Canadian football team in Ontario
- 18876 Sooner, asteroid
- A Girl Named Sooner, a 1975 TV movie
- Sooner, a movie streaming service available in Germany and all Benelux countries
- "Sooner", a 2023 song by Slowthai from the album Ugly
- Sooner Magazine University of Oklahoma alumni publication

== See also ==
- Sooner or Later (disambiguation)
- The Sooner It Comes, album by Aloud
- Schooner (disambiguation)
