= Lats =

Lats or LATS may refer to:

- Latvian lats, a currency (1922–1940, 1993–2014)
- Latissimus dorsi muscles, of the back
- Landfill Allowance Trading Scheme, in UK waste law
- Lawton Area Transit System, southern United States
- Long-acting thyroid stimulants, in Graves' disease
- Latin American Test Symposium, of test and fault tolerance technologists

== See also ==
- Lat (disambiguation)
- Latz, people so named
- Lates, a fish genus
- Lat. (disambiguation)
