= Internet Oracle =

Collaborative humor website

The Internet Oracle (historically known as The Usenet Oracle) is an effort at collective humor in a pseudo-Socratic question-and-answer format.

A user sends a question ("tellme") to the Oracle via e-mail, or the Internet Oracle website, and it is sent to another user (another "incarnation" of the Oracle) who may answer it. Meanwhile, the original questioner is also sent a question to answer. All exchanges are conducted through a central distribution system which makes all users anonymous. Unanswered questions are returned to the queue after a day or two. Users may also request ("askme") unanswered questions without posing their own.

A completed question-and-answer pair is called an "Oracularity".

== Style ==
A representative (and famous) exchange is:

The Usenet Oracle has pondered your question deeply.
Your question was:
> Why is a cow?
And in response, thus spake the Oracle:
} Mu.

Many of the Oracularities contain Zen references and witty wordplay. "Geek" humor is also common, though less common than in the early years of the Oracle's existence, when fewer casual home computer users had Internet access. Most Oracularities are significantly longer than the above example, and they sometimes take the form of rambling narratives, poems, top-ten lists, spoofing of interactive fiction games, or anything else that can be put into plain text.

A complex Oracle mythos has also evolved around the figure of an omniscient, anthropomorphic, geeky deity and a host of grovelling priests and attendants. Other staples in conversation with the Oracle include:

- A *ZOT* (administered with the Staff of Zot, see LART) is earned when the Oracle is irritated. *ZOT*s are something like lightning strikes and are usually fatal. Unscrupulous participants will sometimes administer undeserved *ZOT*s. The particular word *ZOT* may be a reference to the comic strip B.C. Alternatively, it may be an allusion to Walter Karig's 1947 novel entitled Zotz!, in which a person could point at anyone or anything, say "Zotz!" and make that thing or person instantly disintegrate.
- Woodchuck questions are a sure way to earn a *ZOT*. The Oracle will often censor the word "woodchuck" as "w..dch.ck" or simply refer to it obliquely ("rodent of unusual size"). This is a reference to "The Woodchuck Question": "How much wood would a woodchuck chuck if a woodchuck could chuck wood?", which in the early days of the Usenet Oracle, was over-asked to the point of being a cliché.
- Traditionally, questions to the Oracle open with a suitable grovel such as "High and Mighty Oracle, please answer my most humble question," although grovels are often very creative and can be very long, or even part of the question.
- Answers from the Oracle traditionally contain a request for payment such as "You owe the Oracle a rubber chicken and a Cadillac." This segment, often called the "YOTO line" (for "You owe the Oracle") or tribute, often refers to objects that are related, in a punny way, to the answer they are a part of.

An assorted mythos of recurring characters—or in-jokes—has accumulated over the years. These include the worthless High Priest Zadoc (sometimes with an assistant named Kendai), the Oracle's girlfriend Lisa the Net.Sex.Goddess, an assortment of deities, and the caveman figure Og.

== Administration, Digests, and the Priesthood ==
The Oracularities are compiled into periodic digests by a team of volunteer "priests", who read every Oracularity and select what they consider the best. These are posted to the Usenet newsgroup rec.humor.oracle, the Oracle website, and also distributed via e-mailing list.

Now, the forum is basically about asking silly questions to get silly answers; consequently questions meant for libelous intent, questions of a sexual nature, and serious questions are not apt to this forum (although an exception may be made when a serious question is given a particularly silly or funny answer). An especially adept incarnation may occasionally deal with such questions in keeping with the forum—absurdly, perhaps masking the truth, perhaps framing the truth from an absurd viewpoint, or perhaps resorting to nothing but demanding an absurd tribute.

== Usenet discussion group ==
There is a usenet group, news:rec.humor.oracle.d, which is populated by a variety of participants in the Internet Oracle. The group is rife with TOIJs (tired old in-jokes), obscure references and dry humor. This is probably the only group on multicast e-mail systems of any sort where "OT:..." means on topic.

== Origins ==
Peter Langston is credited with the initial idea for an Oracle program. In 1976, he wrote one which ran at the Harvard Science Center's Unix time-sharing system. He then distributed the program via the PSL Games Tape to Unix installations around the world until 1988.

In 1989, Lars Huttar was told about Langston's Oracle by a friend at college. Not knowing where to obtain a copy, he wrote his own version of the program, which only worked when users were logged into the same computer. Huttar posted the source code to the Usenet group alt.sources in August.

Steve Kinzler, who was a graduate student and system administrator at Indiana University, downloaded Huttar's code that same year. He deployed it as the Usenet Oracle on a university server and it became popular. Ray Moody, a graduate student at Purdue University, enhanced the program to allow access via e-mail. This allowed anyone on the Internet to use the Oracle. Kinzler installed this version on another Indiana University computer, where it resided until 2014. It was renamed the Internet Oracle in March 1996.

Kinzler has since made further enhancements, the most prominent being the "priests" choosing Oracularities for irregularly published digests. He provides a server to host the Oracle program, its web site, and archives.

== See also ==
- Q&A website
- Your AI Slop Bores Me
