= Coutard =

Coutard is a French surname. Notable people with the surname include:

- Henri Coutard (1876–1950), French radiation therapist
- Raoul Coutard (1924–2016), French cinematographer
