= Sooner or Later =

Sooner or Later may refer to:

== Film and television ==
- Sooner or Later (1920 film), an American silent comedy directed by Wesley Ruggles
- Sooner or Later (1979 film), an American television film starring Rex Smith
- "Sooner or Later" (Garfield and Friends), a 1992 TV episode

== Music ==
=== Albums ===
- Sooner or Later (BBMak album), 2000
- Sooner or Later (Bob Ostertag album), 1991
- Sooner or Later (Larry Davis album), 1992
- Sooner or Later (Murray Head album), 1987
- Sooner or Later (Rex Smith album) or the title song, 1979
- Sooner or Later, by Larry Graham, or the title song (see below), 1982
- Sooner or Later in Spain, a DVD by Marah, 2006

=== Songs ===
- "Sooner or Later" (Michelle Branch song), 2009
- "Sooner or Later" (Breaking Benjamin song), 2004
- "Sooner or Later" (The Forester Sisters song), 1987; covered by Eddy Raven, 1989
- "Sooner or Later" (Larry Graham song), 1982
- "Sooner or Later" (The Grass Roots song), 1971; covered by GF4, 1994
- "Sooner or Later" (Duncan James song), 2006
- "Sooner or Later" (Madonna song), 1990
- "Sooner or Later" (Johnny Mathis song), 1963
- "One of Us Must Know (Sooner or Later)", by Bob Dylan, 1966
- "Sooner or Later", by the Alan Parsons Project from Vulture Culture, 1985
- "Sooner or Later", by Aaron Carter from Love, 2018
- "Sooner or Later", by Doris Day, 1947
- "Sooner or Later", by Fastball from All the Pain Money Can Buy, 1998
- "Sooner or Later", by House of Heroes from The End Is Not the End, 2008
- "Sooner or Later", by the Jades from Amber Skies, 2009
- "Sooner or Later", by Mat Kearney from Young Love, 2011
- "Sooner or Later", by Jeff Lynne, B-side of the single "Video!", 1984
- "Sooner or Later", by Monrose from Strictly Physical, 2007
- "Sooner or Later", by N.E.R.D. from Seeing Sounds, 2008
- "Sooner or Later", by Dusty Springfield from White Heat, 1982
- "Sooner or Later", by Michael Tolcher from I Am, 2004
- "Sooner or Later", by Years & Years from Night Call, 2022
- "Sooner or Later", from the film Song of the South, 1946
- "Sooner or Later (Soren's Song)", by Switchfoot from New Way to Be Human, 1999

== See also ==
- Sooner (disambiguation)
- Later (disambiguation)
