= ICU =

ICU most commonly refers to intensive care unit, a special department of a hospital

It may also refer to:

== Organisations ==
=== Universities ===
- Information and Communications University, South Korea
- Istanbul Commerce University, Istanbul, Turkey
- International Christian University, Mitaka, Tokyo, Japan
- International Christian University – Kyiv, Ukraine
- Imperial College Union, the students' union of Imperial College London

=== Politics ===
- Industrial and Commercial Workers' Union, a South African political group from the 1920s
- Industrial and Commercial Workers' Union (Ghana), a general union in Ghana
- Internationalist Communist Union, an international grouping of Trotskyist political parties
- Islamic Courts Union, a rival administration in Somalia

=== Other organisations ===
- ICU Medical, an American company
- International Cheer Union, the worldwide governing body of cheerleading
- Investment Capital Ukraine, a Kyiv-based financial group
- International Clearing Union, a 1944 currency exchange regulatory institution proposal
- Irish Chess Union
- Independent Checking Unit, Under the Office of the Permanent Secretary for Housing of Hong Kong SAR Government

== Arts and entertainment ==
- I.C.U. (film), a 2009 Australian thriller
- Inner City Unit, a British band
- "ICU", a song by 69Boyz from the album The Wait Is Over, 1998
- "I.C.U.", a song by Adore Delano from the album After Party, 2016
- "ICU", a song by Phoebe Bridgers from the album Punisher, 2020
- "ICU (Madison's Lullabye)", a song by Demi Lovato from the album Dancing with the Devil... the Art of Starting Over, 2021
- "ICU" (song), a song by Coco Jones from the EP What I Didn't Tell You, 2022

== Other acronyms ==
- .icu, an Internet top-level domain
- International Components for Unicode, software libraries supporting internationalization
- Intersection capacity utilization, a measure of the capacity of a roadway intersection

== Other uses ==
- ICÚ (restaurant), in Puerto Vallarta, Mexico
- Infection Control Unit, monitors day-to-day situation and offers professional recommendations on patient care practice and related infection control guidelines

== See also ==
- I See You (disambiguation)
