= I See You =

I See You may refer to:

== Music ==
=== Albums ===
- I See You, an EP and song by Juliana Hatfield
- I See You (Gong album), 2014
- I See You (The xx album), 2017

=== Songs ===
- "I See You" (Chris Tomlin and Brandon Lake song), 2021
- "I See You" (Jutty Ranx song), 2013
- "I See You" (Luke Bryan song), 2014
- "I See You (Theme from Avatar)", 2009, by Leona Lewis
- "I See You", by Bear Hands from You'll Pay for This, 2016
- "I See You", by The Byrds from Fifth Dimension, 1966
- "I See You", by Dirty Projectors from Dirty Projectors (album), 2017
- "I See You", by The Horrors from Luminous (The Horrors album), 2014
- "I See You", by Idina Menzel from Idina, 2016
- "I See You", a single by Kristin Amparo, 2015
- "I See You", by Kygo from Kids in Love (album), 2017
- "I See You", by Mika from The Boy Who Knew Too Much, 2009
- "I Seeeeee You Baby Boi", also referred to just "I See You", by Playboi Carti from Music, 2025

== Film and television ==
- I See You (2006 film), a Bollywood romance
- I-See-You.Com, a 2006 comedy film
- "I See You" (Breaking Bad), a 2010 episode of Breaking Bad
- Kita Kita (I See You), a 2017 Philippine romantic comedy film
- I See You (2019 film), an American thriller film

== Other uses ==
- iSeeYou, a security bug affecting iSight cameras in some Apple laptops
- I See You, a 2016 novel by Clare Mackintosh

== See also ==
- ICU (disambiguation)
- See You (disambiguation)
- I Can See You (disambiguation)
