= Rollet =

Rollet may refer to:

== People ==
- André Rollet (1905–1985), French footballer
- Joseph Rollet (1824–1894), French surgeon, venereologist and dermatologis
- Louis René Lucien Rollet (1809-1862), French engraver
- Louis Rollet (1895–1988), French painter
- Marie Rollet (died 1649), an early settler in Quebec
- Maurice Rollet (1933–2014), French activist
- Paul-Frédéric Rollet (1875–1941), French general

== Places ==
- Rollet, former municipality now in Rouyn-Noranda, Canada
- Rollet Island, Antarctica
