= Antoine Lacassagne =

Antoine Marcellin Bernard Lacassagne
- Born: August 29, 1884; Villerest, France
- Died: December 16, 1971 (aged 87); Paris, France
- Occupations: Physician, Professor
- Employer: Collège de France (1941-1951)
- Parents: Alexandre Lacassagne (father); Madeleine Rollet (mother)
- Relatives: Joseph Rollet
- Honours: Commander of the Legion of Honor; Grand Officer of the National Order of Merit

Antoine Marcellin Bernard Lacassagne (August 29, 1884, Villerest – December 16, 1971, Paris) was a French physician and biologist, a pioneer in radiology and cancer research.

== Biography ==
Antoine Lacassagne was born on August 29, 1884, in Villerest in a family of physicians. His father, Alexandre Lacassagne, was a military physician, criminologist and a professor of forensic medicine at the Faculty of Medicine in Lyon. His grandfather, surgeon, venereologist, and dermatologist Joseph Rollet (1824–1894), was a professor of hygiene at the same faculty. He was the older brother of the dermatologist and medical historian Jean Lacassagne (1886–1960), and his sister Jeanne married histologist Albert Policard.

After obtaining his bachelor's degree in Lyon in 1902, he pursued medical studies. He was admitted to an internship in 1908 as a laboratory assistant in histology. In 1909, Claudius Regaud assigned him the topic for his thesis, "The Study of the Effects of X-rays and Radioactivity on the Sexual Behavior of Rabbits." In 1913, he defended his doctoral thesis in medicine: "Histological and Physiological Studies of the Effects Produced on the Ovary by X-rays." Claudius Regaud then offered Lacassagne to become his assistant in Paris, where he had just been appointed to lead the Radium Institute alongside Marie Curie. In October of the same year, Lacassagne joined the biology section (or Pasteur Laboratory) of the Radium Institute.

Upon the outbreak of World War I in 1914, he was mobilized to the front as an auxiliary military physician. In 1916, he joined the Army of the Orient and was stationed in Corfu, where a typhus epidemic affected the Serbian army. In 1917, he participated in the treatment of Spanish flu patients.

In 1919, he resumed his work at the Pasteur Laboratory of the Radium Institute alongside Claudius Regaud, with whom he formed a team that developed techniques for cancer treatment using ionizing radiation. Along with Jeanne Ferrier, he invented the method of autoradiography. He served as the deputy director of the Pasteur Pavilion from 1923 to 1937.

In 1932, he demonstrated that the injection of folliculin (estrogen) in mice increased the frequency of breast cancer in them. This discovery paved the way for a new therapy (antiestrogens), known as hormone therapy.

In 1937, he succeeded Claudius Regaud as the head of the Radium Institute, a position he held until 1954. In 1941, he was appointed as a professor at the Collège de France in the field of experimental radiobiology. He was elected as a member of the Académie Nationale de Médecine in 1948 and the French Academy of Sciences in 1949.

From 1951 until his retirement in 1954, he held the chair of experimental medicine at the Collège de France, where his lectures were focused on oncology. In July 1957, he was an invited member of the first Pugwash Conference, a movement advocating for peace and against weapons of mass destruction. He also served on the Patronage Committee of the French Federation against Atomic Armament.

After the death of Justin Godart in 1956, he assumed the presidency of the National League Against Cancer until his death on December 16, 1971, in an act of defenestration. He left three letters explaining his suicide, one of which was addressed to L'Express and published, in which he stated, "I have made a recent error in judgment that I cannot survive."

After receiving numerous awards from the Academy of Sciences, he was honored in 1962 with one of the awards created by the United Nations General Assembly "for his extensive work over a long research career in the field of cancer, including significant contributions related to radiology in relation to cancer, the role of estrogens in the etiology of breast tumors, and the role of hydrocarbons in carcinogenesis."

== Honors ==
- Commander of the Legion of Honor
- Grand Officer of the National Order of Merit

== Tributes ==
The cancer center in Nice is named after him.
