= Larry Davis (blues musician) =

American singer and guitarist

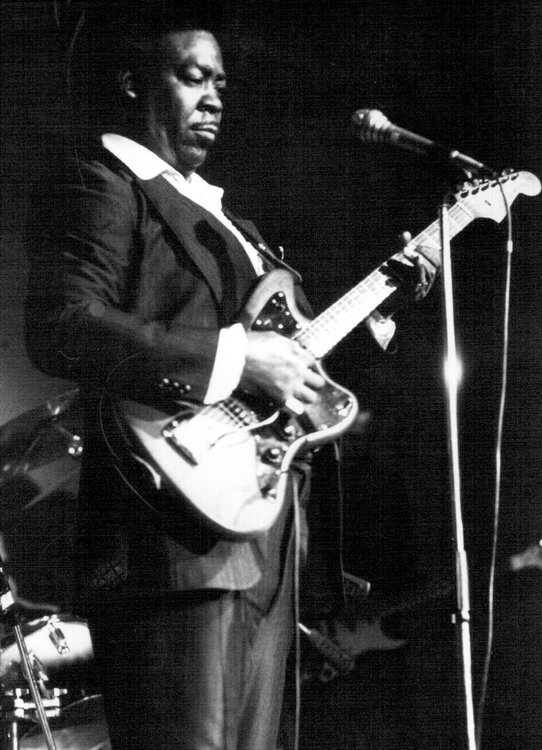
- Davis in 1983

Background information
- Born: December 4, 1936; Pine Bluff, Arkansas, U.S.
- Died: April 19, 1994 (aged 57) Los Angeles, California, U.S.
- Genres: Texas blues, soul blues, electric blues
- Occupations: Singer, guitarist, songwriter
- Instruments: Vocals, guitar, bass guitar
- Years active: Mid-1950s–1994
- Labels: Rooster Blues, various

Larry Davis (December 4, 1936 – April 19, 1994) was an American electric Texas blues and soul blues musician. He is best known for co-writing the song "Texas Flood", later recorded to greater commercial success by Stevie Ray Vaughan.

== Biography ==
Davis was born in Pine Bluff, Arkansas, and was raised in England, Arkansas, and Little Rock, Arkansas. He swapped playing the drums to learn to play the bass guitar. In the mid-1950s, he had a working partnership with Fenton Robinson, and following the recommendation of Bobby Bland was given a recording contract by Duke Records. Davis had three singles released, which included "Texas Flood" and "Angels in Houston". Thereafter, he had limited opportunity in the recording studio. He resided in St. Louis, Missouri, for a while, and played bass in Albert King's group. He also learned to play the guitar at this time; the guitar on Davis's recording of "Texas Flood" was by played by Robinson.

Several single releases on the Virgo and Kent labels followed, but in 1972 a motorcycle accident temporarily paralyzed Davis's left side. He returned a decade later with an album released by Rooster Blues, Funny Stuff, produced by Oliver Sain. He won four W. C. Handy Awards in 1982, but a decade later he was known only to blues specialists. His 1987 Pulsar LP, I Ain't Beggin' Nobody, was difficult even for blues enthusiasts to locate.

In 1992, Bullseye Blues issued another album, Sooner or Later, highlighting his booming vocals and guitar playing influenced by Albert King.

Davis died of cancer in April 1994, at the age of 57.

== Selected discography ==
- Live At J.B.Hutto's (1980), P-Vine
- Funny Stuff (1982), Rooster Blues
- Angels In Houston (1982), Rounder - shared album with Bobby Bland, James "Thunderbird" Davis, Fenton Robinson
- Blues Knights (1985), Blue Phoenix; Evidence; Black & Blue - shared album with Byther Smith
- I Ain't Beggin' Nobody (1987), Pulsar; Evidence
- Sooner or Later (1992), Bullseye Blues/Rounder
- Sweet Little Angel: B.B. King Presents Larry Davis (2002), P-Vine

== See also ==
- List of electric blues musicians
- List of Texas blues musicians
