= See You =

See You may refer to:

- "See You" (Depeche Mode song), 1982
- See You (1995 film), a Croatian television film
- See You (1999 film), an Italian coming-of-age comedy-drama film
- "See You" (Big Country song), 1999
- "See You...", a 2006 single by melody
- See You (album), by Josh Wilson, 2011

See Ya, or Seeya may refer to:

- "See Ya" (Atomic Kitten song), 2000
- SeeYa, a South Korean girl band formed in 2006
- "Seeya" (Deadmau5 song), 2014

== See also ==
- I See You (disambiguation)
- See You Later (disambiguation)
- CYA (disambiguation)
- "See Ya Bill", a song
