= LATT =

LATT may refer to:

== Businesses and organisations ==
- Lake Asphalt of Trinidad and Tobago, a mining company
- Los Angeles Trade Tech, an American college
- Library Association of Trinidad and Tobago, see List of library associations § Trinidad and Tobago

== See also ==
- LAT (disambiguation)
- Latte (disambiguation)
- Kristin Lätt, Estonian professional disc golfer
