= Later =

Later may refer to:

- Future, the time after the present

== Television ==
- Later (talk show), a 1988–2001 American talk show
- Later... with Jools Holland, a British music programme since 1992
- The Life and Times of Eddie Roberts, or L.A.T.E.R., a 1980 American sitcom
- "Later" (BoJack Horseman), an episode

== Other uses ==
- Later (magazine), a 1999–2001 British men's magazine
- Later (novel), a 2021 novel by Stephen King
- "Later" (song), a 2016 song by Example
- Later: My Life at the Edge of the World, a book by Paul Lisicky

== See also ==
- L8R (disambiguation)
- Late (disambiguation)
- See You Later (disambiguation)
- Sooner or Later (disambiguation)
