= Wey Macchiato =

Crossover SUV from China

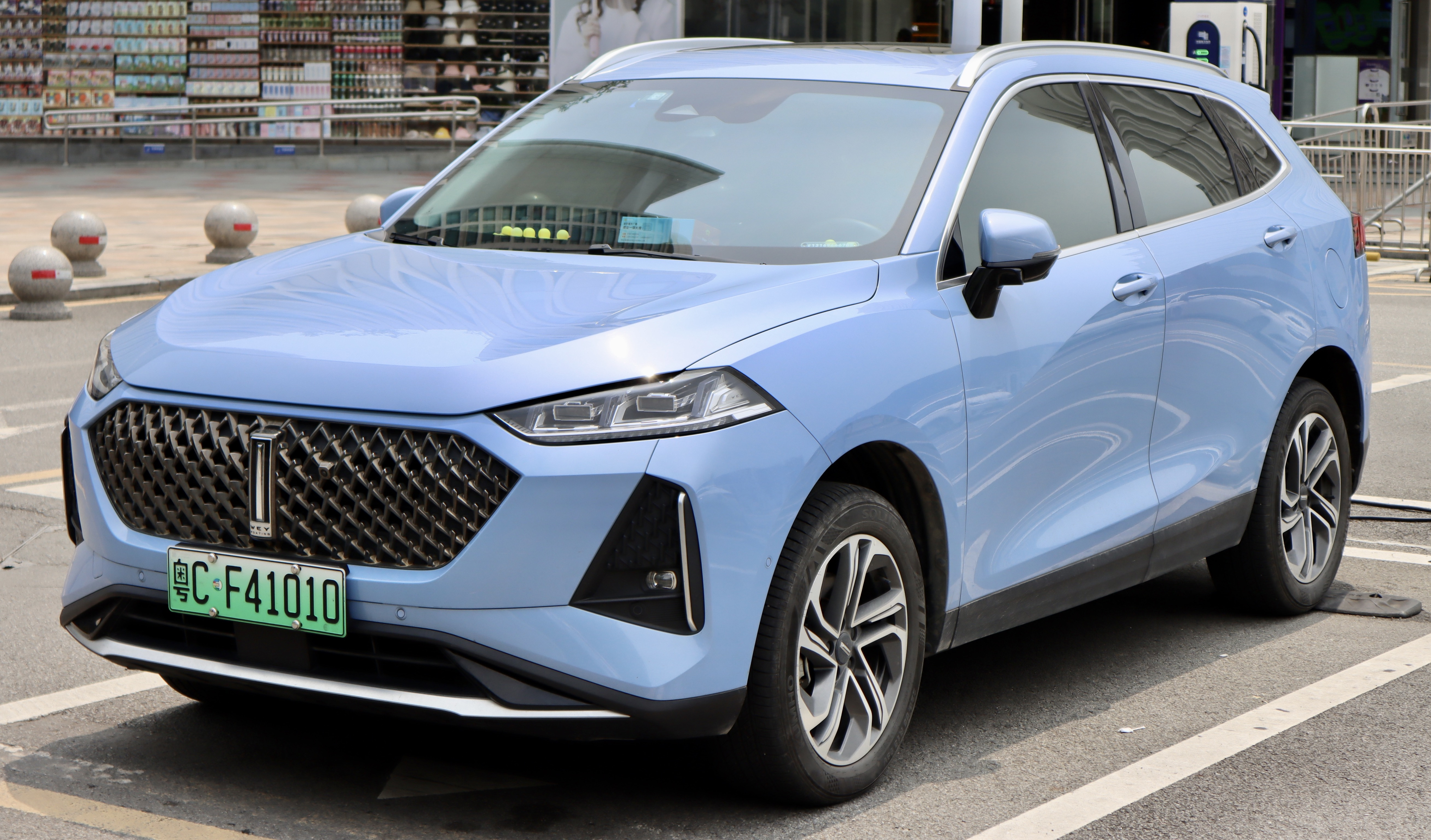

Overview
- Manufacturer: Great Wall Motor
- Also called: Ora Cherry Cat
- Production: 2021–2023
- Assembly: China: Tianjin

Body and chassis
- Class: Compact luxury crossover SUV
- Body style: 5-door SUV
- Layout: Front-engine, front-wheel-drive; Front-motor, front-wheel drive (Ora Big Cat); Front-engine, all-wheel-drive
- Platform: GWM Lemon Platform

Powertrain
- Engine: 1.5 L GW15 I4 (petrol)
- Electric motor: 100 kW DHT100 BorgWarner permanent magnet synchronous; 150 kW permanent magnet synchronous (Ora Big Cat)
- Transmission: Multi-mode DHT (Hybrid); Direct-Drive (Electric)
- Hybrid drivetrain: Power-split Hybrid (Macchiato Hybrid) plug-in hybrid (Macchiato PHEV)
- Battery: 1.6 kWh Li-ion (Hybrid); 45 kWh Li-ion (PHEV)

Dimensions
- Wheelbase: 2,710 mm (106.7 in)
- Length: 4,520 mm (178.0 in)
- Width: 1,855 mm (73.0 in)
- Height: 1,665 mm (65.6 in)

Chronology
- Predecessor: Wey VV5

The Wey Macchiato (Chinese: 魏牌玛奇朵; pinyin: Wèipái Mǎqíduǒ) is a compact luxury crossover SUV produced by Great Wall Motor under the premium brand, Wey.

== Overview ==
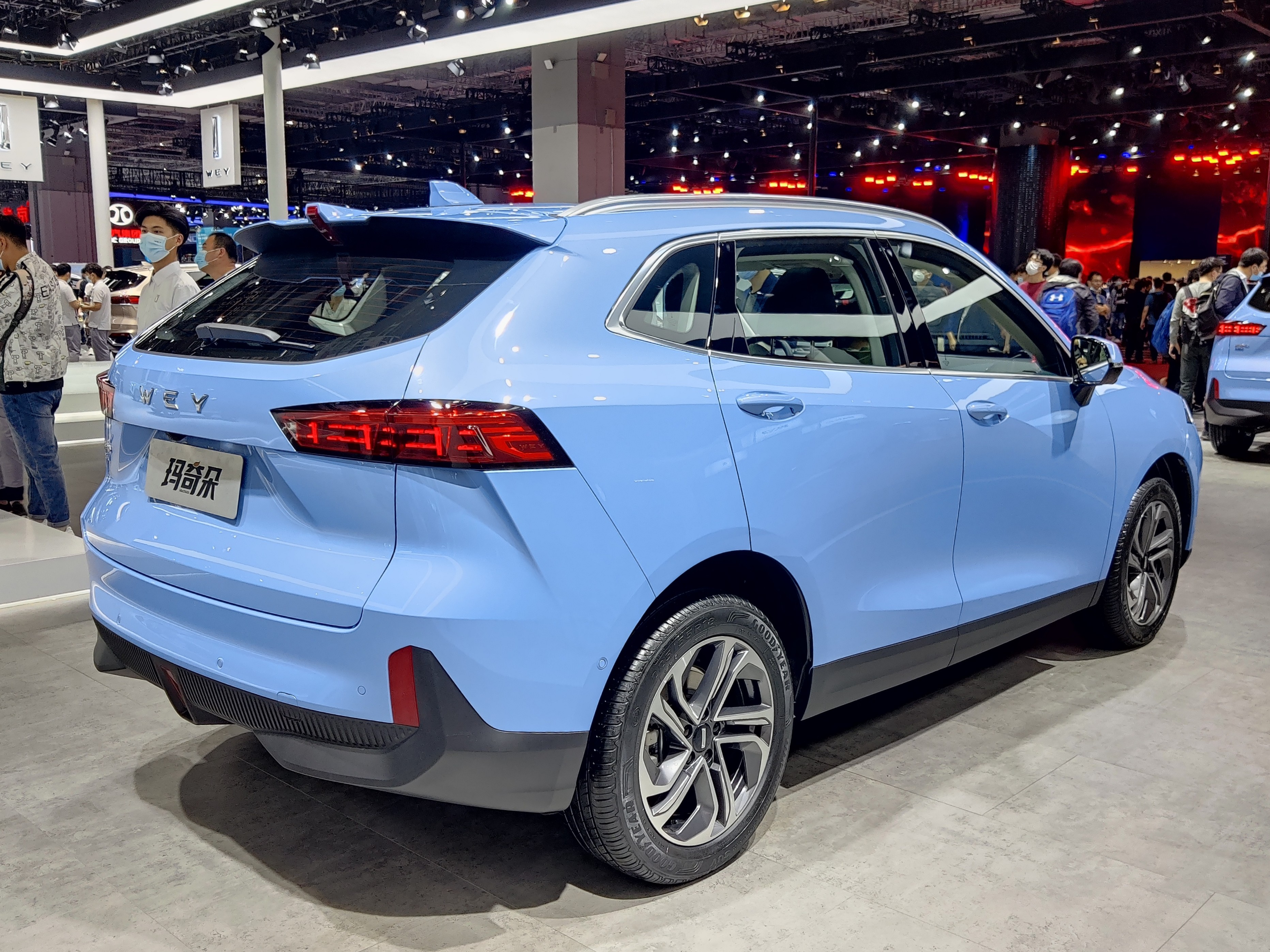
Rear view

The Macchiato was presented during the Shanghai Auto Show in 2021. Sales started in April 2021 at Auto Shanghai in the Mainland Chinese market.

The crossover SUV is named after the caffè macchiato. With the Mocha and the Latte, two other vehicles of the brand named after coffee specialties were also presented at Auto Shanghai.

The Macchiato is similar in style to the Mocha and the Latte and utilizes the same Lemon architecture developed inhouse by Great Wall Motor with its independent rear suspension. 17- and 18-inch wheels are available depending on the trim level.

=== Powertrain ===
The Macchiato compact crossover is equipped with the DHT hybrid powertrain which is FWD only and not chargeable from charging ports and utility power network. The DHT hybrid powertrain consists of a 1.5-liter naturally aspirated petrol engine producing 102 PS (75 kW; 101 hp) and a DHT100 electric motor producing 136 PS (100 kW; 134 hp) and 250 N⋅m (180 lb⋅ft; 25 kg⋅m) of torque. The combined maximum total output of the hybrid system is 192 PS (141 kW; 189 hp). The electric motor drives the car alone when the vehicle is traveling under 35 km/h (22 mph), while the petrol engine acts purely as a range extender at these low speeds, producing power for the main motor. During rapid acceleration, the petrol engine temporarily switches to driving the wheels. The traction battery sits beneath the rear bank of the vehicle and holds up to 1.7 kilowatt-hours of energy.

In terms of transmission, the fixed-axle gear train, with a two-speed gear ratio in engine direct drive mode, provides a maximum transmission efficiency of 97%. Great Wall Motors DHT see considered four levels of simulated gears.

== Ora Cherry Cat/Big Cat ==
An electric prototype based on the Wey Macchiato with the codename Ora Big Cat (大猫) was unveiled during the 2021 Shanghai Auto Show. The styling of the Big Cat is identical to the Macchiato except for the sealed front grilles and the Ora badging. By July 2021, patent images of the vehicle showed up with the name Ora Cherry Cat (樱桃猫), and listed performance features a 150 kW (201 hp; 204 PS) electric motor.

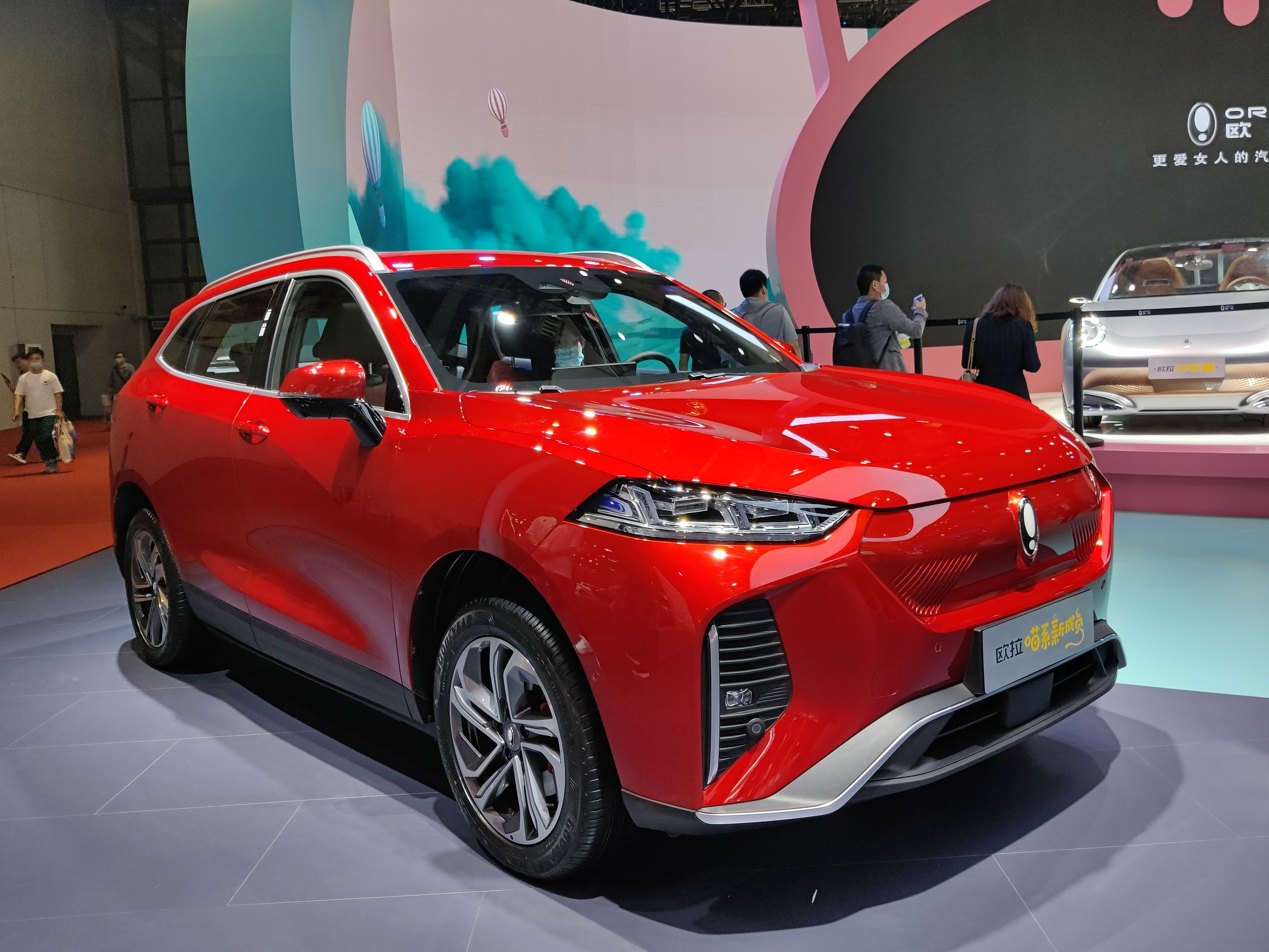
Ora Big Cat

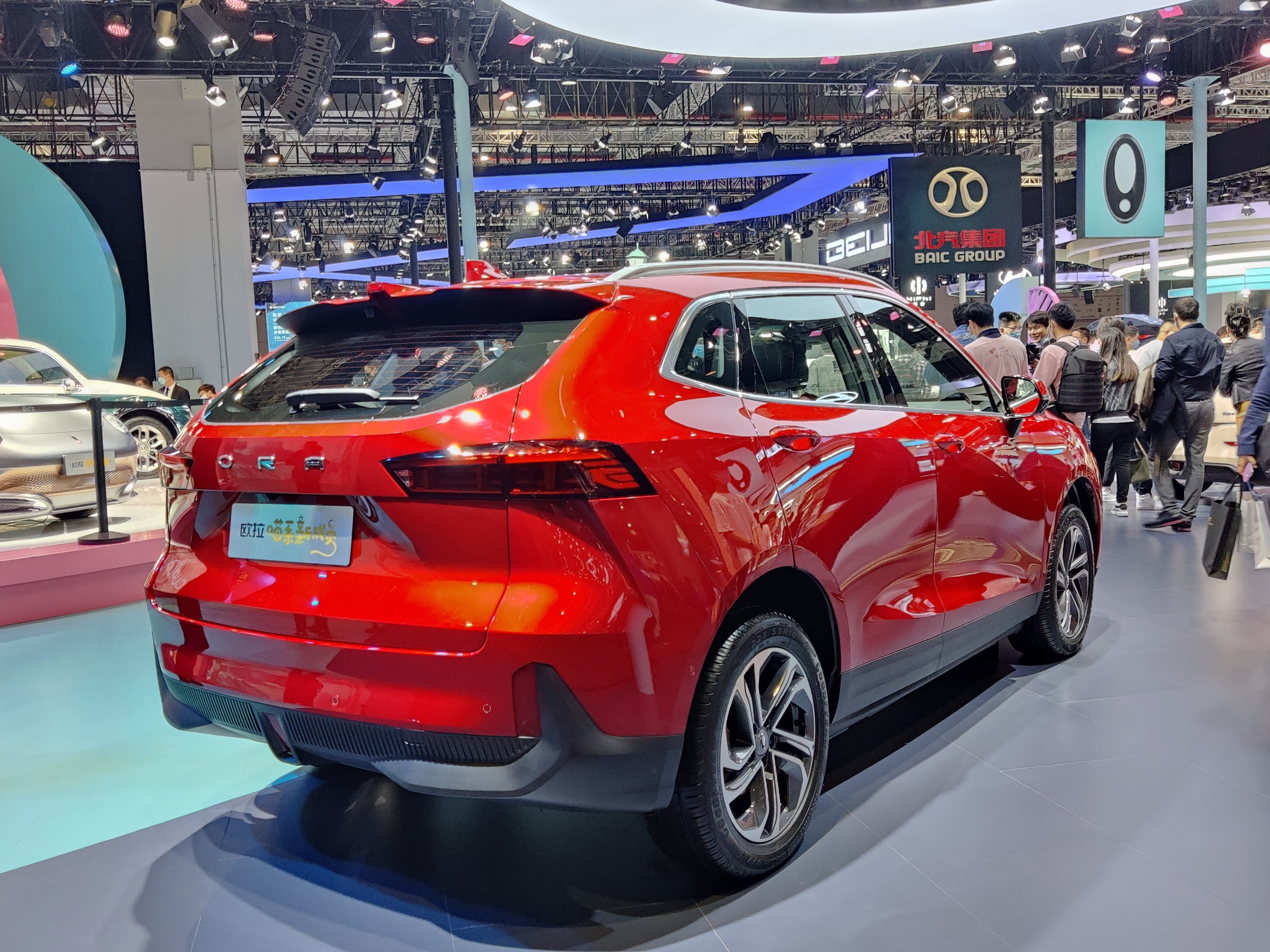
Rear view
