= CYA =

CYA may stand for:

- California Youth Authority, now California Division of Juvenile Justice
- Canadian Yachting Association, now Sail Canada
- College Year in Athens, a U.S. study abroad program
- Cover your ass, a defensive practice against legal penalties or criticism
- Cyanuric acid, a chemical compound
- ^{14}Cya, meaning "radiocarbon years ago" in calibration of radiocarbon dates
- CYA, the IATA code for Antoine-Simon Airport, Haiti
- CyA, a South Korean musician now known by his birth name Giuk

== See also ==
- See You (disambiguation) (including "seeya")
