= Dissé-sous-Ballon =

- Part of Marolles-les-Braults
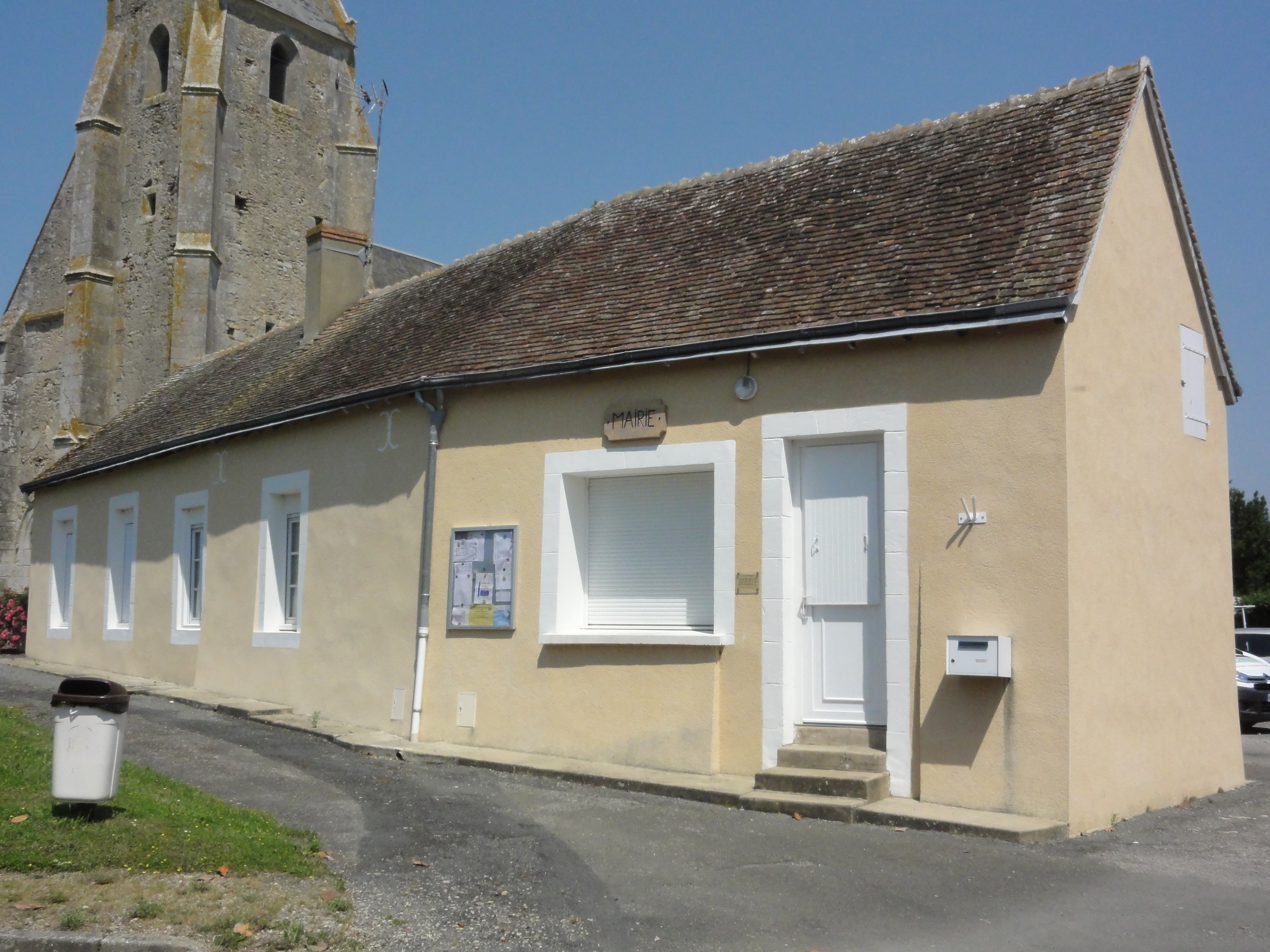
- Dissé-sous-Ballon Town hall
- Location of Dissé-sous-Ballon
- Location within France Location within Pays de la Loire
- Coordinates: 48°14′13″N 0°17′58″E
- Country: France
- Region: Pays de la Loire
- Department: Sarthe
- Arrondissement: Mamers
- Canton: Mamers
- Commune: Marolles-les-Braults
- Area^{1}: 3.6 km^{2} (1.4 sq mi)
- Highest elevation: 84 m (276 ft)
- Lowest elevation: 57 m (187 ft)
- Population (2018): 143
  - Density: 40/km^{2} (100/sq mi)
- Demonym(s): Disséen, Disséenne
- Time zone: UTC+01:00 (CET)
  - Summer (DST): UTC+02:00 (CEST)
- Postal code: 72260
- ^{1} French Land Register data, which excludes lakes, ponds, glaciers > 1 km^{2} (0.386 sq mi or 247 acres) and river estuaries.

Dissé-sous-Ballon (French pronunciation: [dise su balɔ̃]) is a former commune in the Sarthe department in the Pays de la Loire region in north-western France. On 1 January 2019, it was merged into the commune Marolles-les-Braults.

== See also ==
- Communes of the Sarthe department
