= Jeanne Ferrier =

French physicist (1888–1979)

- in 1940
- Born: April 6, 1888; Montpellier, France
- Died: May 23, 1979 (aged 91); Paris, France
- Education: University of Montpellier
- Spouse(s): Samuel Lattès (m. 1910–1918) Georges Fournier (m. 1929).
- Scientific career
- Fields: Radiotherapy

Jeanne Ferrier, married names Jeanne Lattès and Jeanne Fournier, (April 6, 1888, Montpellier – May 23, 1979, Paris) was a French physicist. A pioneer in the field of radiotherapy, she was one of the most prominent figures at the Radium Institute in Paris where she collaborated with Marie Curie in the 1920s.

== Early life and education ==
Born in Montpellier on April 6, 1888, Jeanne Ferrier was the daughter of the headmaster Zephirin Ferrier and his wife Louise née Crouzet, a schoolteacher. The first of the family's four children, she was passionately interested in science and went on to earn a dual degree in mathematics and physics from the University of Montpellier.

== Career ==
Following her graduation, Ferrier became a science teacher at a boys' high school in Tarbes.

In 1910, she married her professor, Samuel Lattès, who died in 1918. After becoming a widow for the first time, she moved to Paris and joined Marie Curie's laboratory with the support of a Carnegie grant. There, she conducted research on tissue necrosis induced by radium radiation. Between 1921 and 1929, she carried out scientific research at the Radium Institute.

In 1924, she collaborated with Antoine Lacassagne on the detection and localisation of radioactive elements in cells. The method she developed, autoradiography, is considered one of the most significant contributions to biology in the 20th century.

At Marie Curie's lab - Jeanne Ferrier is top right, Sonia Cotelle is sat in the centre

On May 27, 1926, she defended her doctoral thesis titled "Étude, par la méthode d'absorption, du rayonnement du radium et de son rayonnement secondaire" (Study of Radium Radiation and Its Secondary Radiation by the Absorption Method), which was later published in the journal Annales de physique.

Around 1930, health concerns compelled her to cease working with radioactivity. She then joined the Henri Poincaré Institute as an assistant in probability calculations under Émile Borel's guidance, where she worked until her retirement in 1958.

== Family ==
Jeanne Ferrier was first married to Samuel Lattès on August 17, 1910, and became a widow in 1918, with one daughter from this first marriage. In her second marriage, she wed her collaborator, physicist Georges Fournier, on August 31, 1929, with whom she had two children.

== Notable works ==
Jeanne Lattès conducted research in the field of radioactivity, including studies on tissue necrosis caused by radium radiation and the detection of radioactive elements in cells. Some of her notable works include:

- "Sur les conditions physiques qui accompagnent le phénomène de nécrose produit par les rayons du radium" (On the Physical Conditions Accompanying the Phenomenon of Necrosis Produced by Radium Rays) – Comptes rendus de l'Académie des sciences, 176 (1923), 867–869.
- "Sur quelques valeurs numériques caractérisant les rayons du radium responsables du phénomène de nécrose" (On Some Numerical Values Characterizing the Radium Rays Responsible for the Necrosis Phenomenon) – Comptes rendus de l'Académie des sciences, 176 (1923), 963–967.
- "Méthode auto-histo-radiographique pour la détection dans les organes du polonium injecté" (Auto-Histo-Radiographic Method for the Detection of Injected Polonium in Organs) – Comptes rendus de l'Académie des sciences, 178 (1924), 488–490.
- "Techniques chimico-physique de détection du polonium injecté dans les organes" (Chemico-Physical Techniques for Detecting Injected Polonium in Organs) – Comptes rendus de l'Académie des sciences, 178 (1924), 630–632.
- "Dosage, dans les différents organes, du polonium injecté dans l'organisme" (Dosage of Injected Polonium in Various Organs) - Comptes rendus de l'Académie des sciences (1924), 178, 771–773.
- "Sur l’absorption des rayons β par la matière" (On the Absorption of β-Rays by Matter) – Comptes rendus de l'Académie des sciences (1925), 181, 855–856.
- "Sur l’absorption des rayons β par la matière" (On the Absorption of β-Rays by Matter) – Comptes rendus de l'Académie des sciences (1925), 181, 1135–1136.
- "Étude par la méthode d'absorption du rayonnement du radium et de son rayonnement secondaire" (Study of Radium Radiation and Its Secondary Radiation by the Absorption Method) – Ann. Phys., Volume 10, Number 6, 1926, 102–182.

== See also ==
- List of women associated with Marie Curie and Irène Joliot-Curie
