= Wey Mocha =

Chinese mid-size luxury crossover SUV

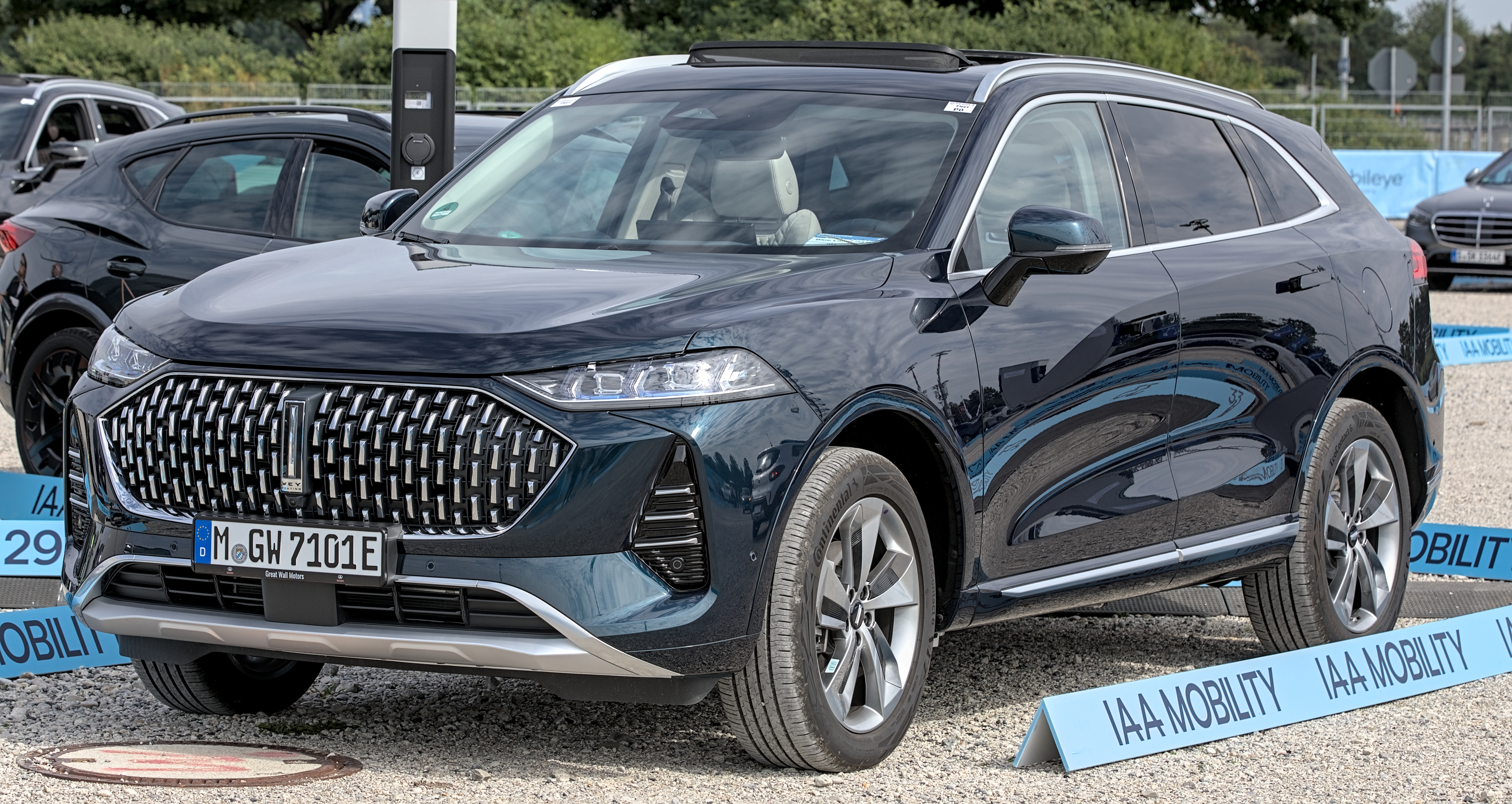
- Wey Coffee 01 PHEV at the IAA 2021

Overview
- Manufacturer: Great Wall Motor
- Also called: Wey Coffee 01 (Europe until end of 2023); GWM Wey 05 (Europe starting 2024)
- Production: 2021–present
- Assembly: China: Tianjin

Body and chassis
- Class: Mid-size luxury crossover SUV
- Body style: 5-door SUV
- Layout: Front-engine, front-wheel-drive or all-wheel-drive

Powertrain
- Engine: 1.5 L GW4E15BD I4 turbo (Petrol plug-in hybrid) (2022-24); 1.5 L GWE15BE I4 turbo (Petrol plug-in hybrid) (2024-present); 2.0 L GW4E20CB I4 turbo (Petrol); 2.0 L GW4C20A I4 turbo (Petrol plug-in hybrid)
- Electric motor: 85 kW
- Transmission: 9-speed DCT; Multi-mode DHT (Hybrid)
- Hybrid drivetrain: Plug-in hybrid (Mocha PHEV)
- Battery: 45 kWh (160 MJ) Li-ion (PHEV) (2021-23); 35.04 kWh (126.1 MJ) NMC (PHEV) (2024 to present)
- Range: 600 km (373 mi)

Dimensions
- Wheelbase: 2,915 mm (114.8 in)
- Length: 4,875 mm (191.9 in)
- Width: 1,960 mm (77.2 in)
- Height: 1,690 mm (66.5 in)

Chronology
- Predecessor: WEY VV7

The Wey Mocha (Chinese: 魏牌摩卡; pinyin: Wèipái Mókǎ) is a mid-size luxury crossover SUV produced by Great Wall Motor under the premium brand, Wey.

== Overview ==
The Mocha was presented in January 2021. Sales started in April 2021 at Auto Shanghai in the Mainland Chinese market. The SUV is named after mocha coffee. With the Latte and the Macchiato, two other vehicles of the brand named after coffee specialties were also presented at Auto Shanghai.

At the market launch, the 4.88-metre-long (192 in) SUV was only available with a 157 kW (211 hp; 213 PS) 2.0-liter petrol engine. A plug-in hybrid version with an electric range of around 200 km was to follow later.

The Mocha is also known as the Wey Coffee 01 in European markets.

=== Gallery ===
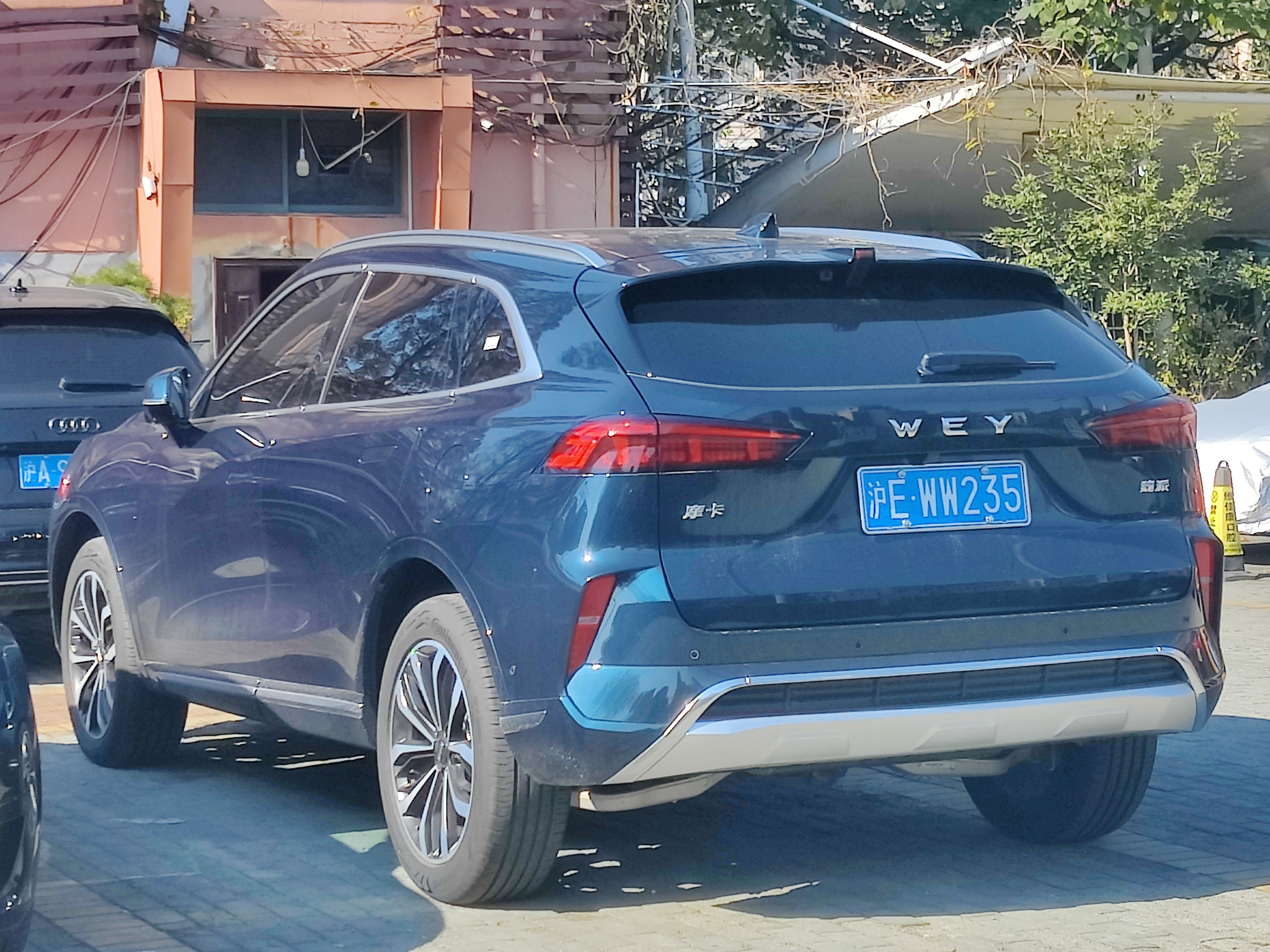
Rear view

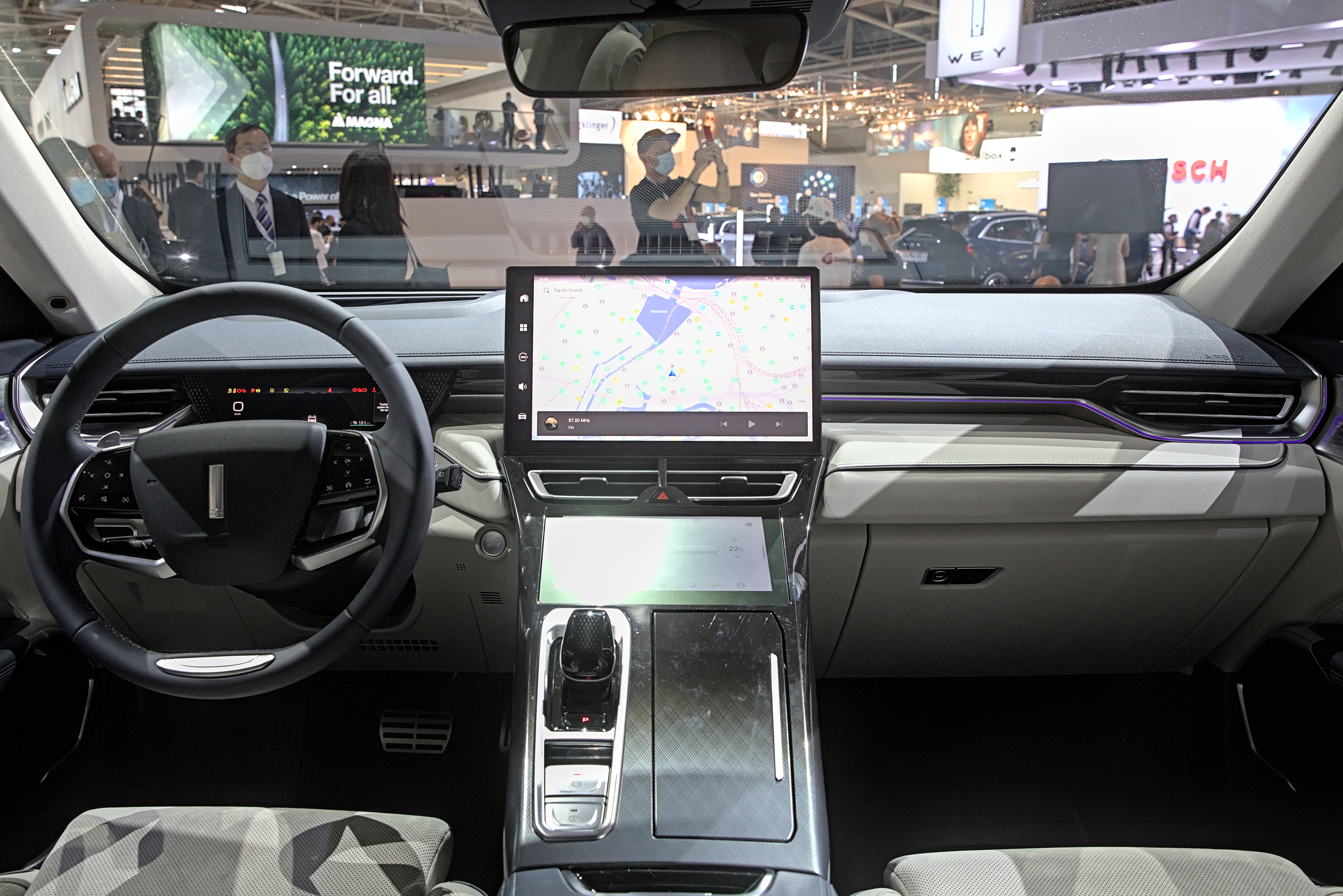
Interior

==== 2023 facelift ====
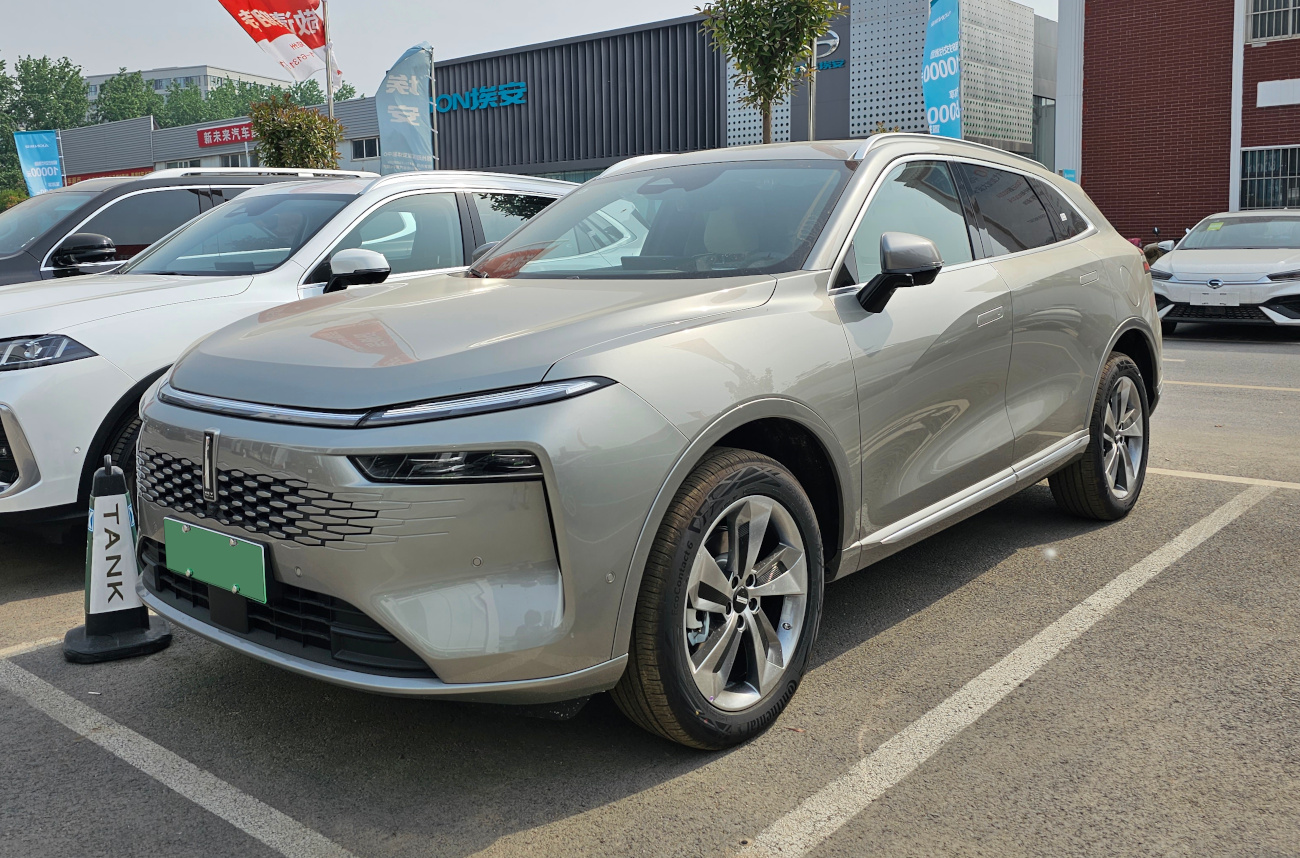
Wey Mocha DHT-PHEV (facelift) front

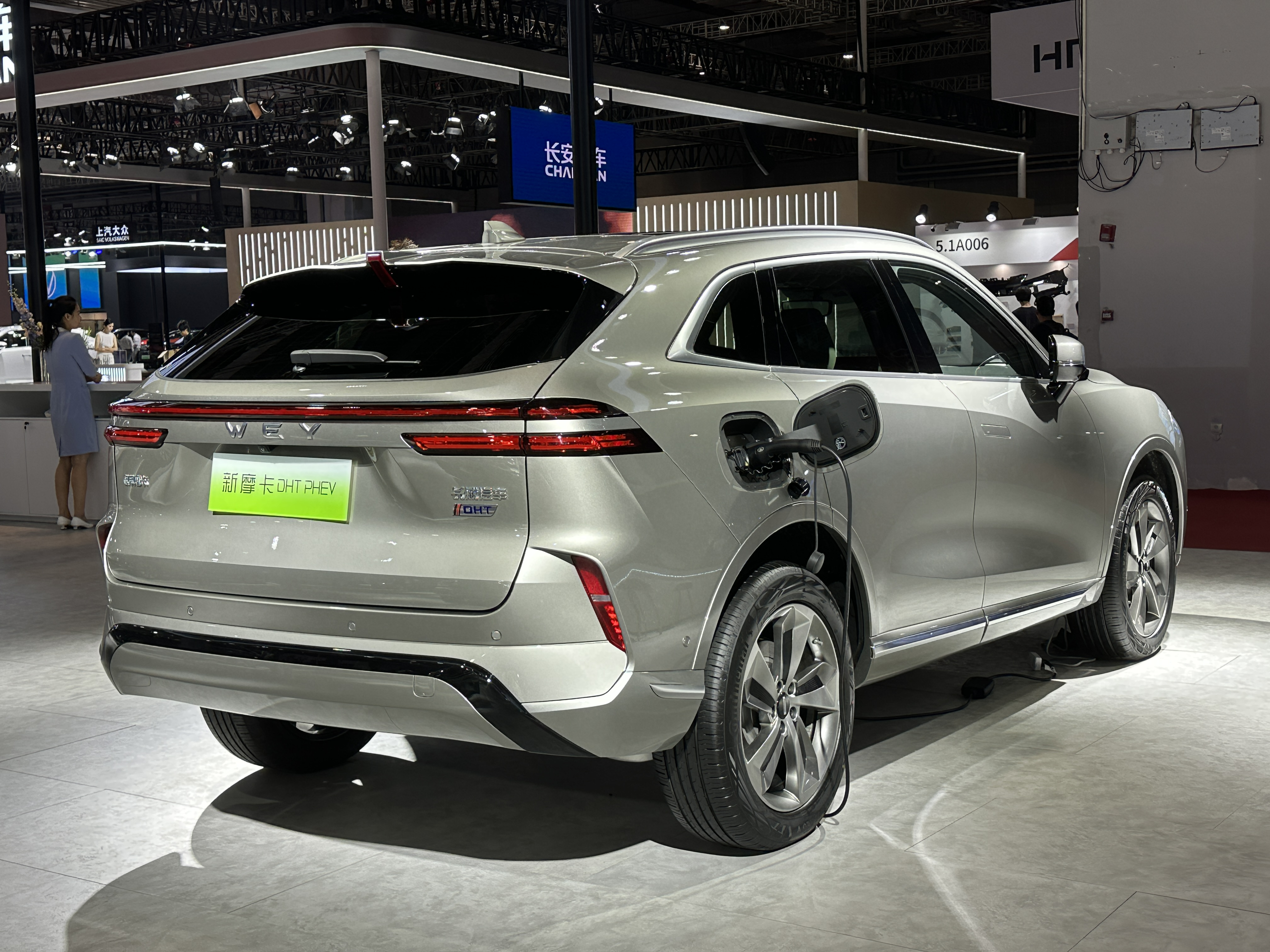
Wey Mocha DHT-PHEV (facelift) rear

=== Safety ===
Euro NCAP test results GWM Wey Coffee 01 Prestige (LHD) (2022)
Test	Points	%
Overall:	5 /5 stars	
Adult occupant:	34.8	91%
Child occupant:	43	87%
Pedestrian:	42.9	79%
Safety assist:	15.1	94%

== Sales ==
Year	China
2023	5,037
2024	2,924
2025	1,915
