= L8R =

L8R may refer to:

- L8R (band), a 2000s Norwegian band
- "L8r", a song by Azealia Banks off of Fantasea (mixtape)
- L8R or l8r, "later" in SMS language

== See also ==
- L8r, g8r, a 2007 novel by Lauren Myracle
- Later (disambiguation)
