= Your AI Slop Bores Me =

Online social experiment and parody website

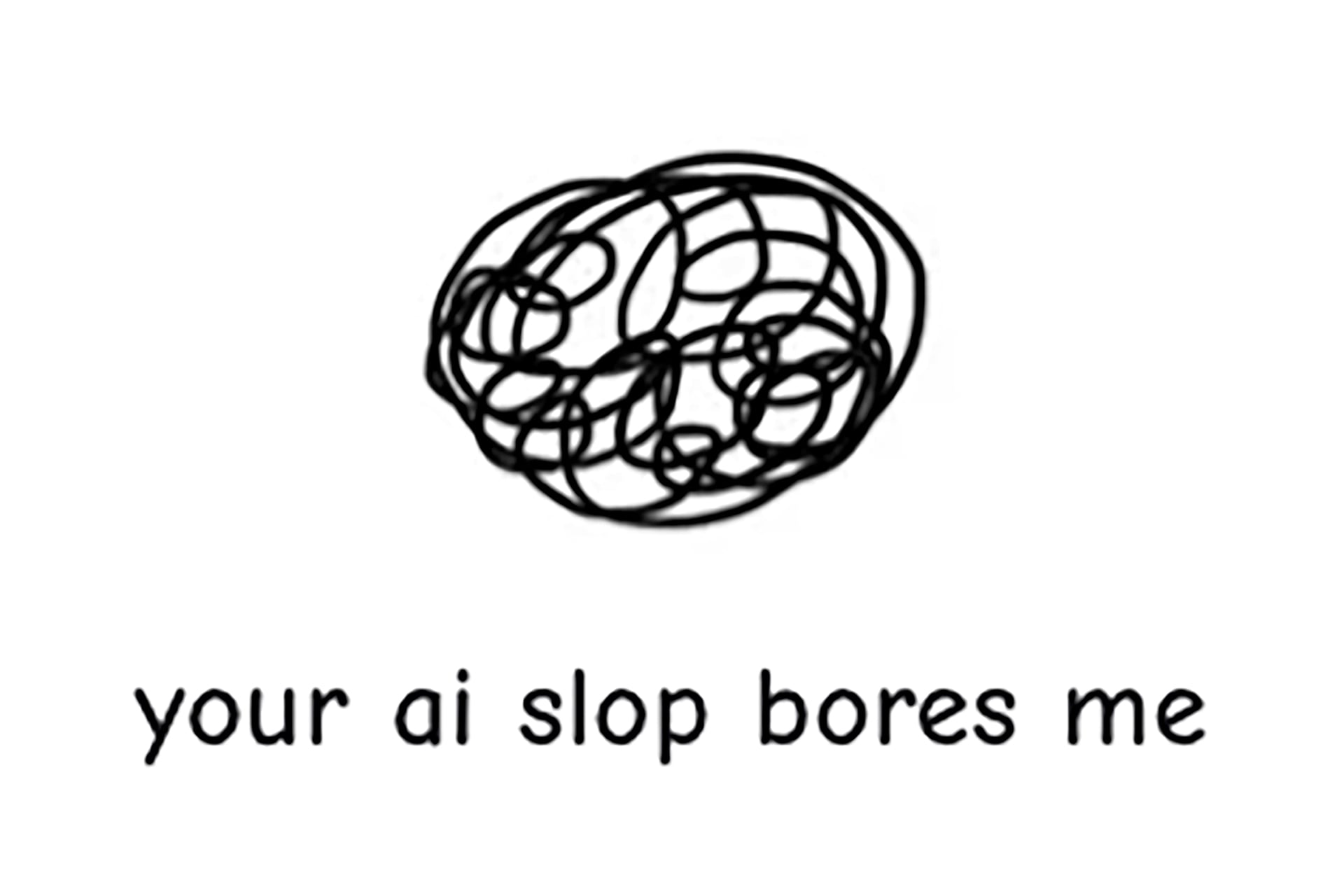

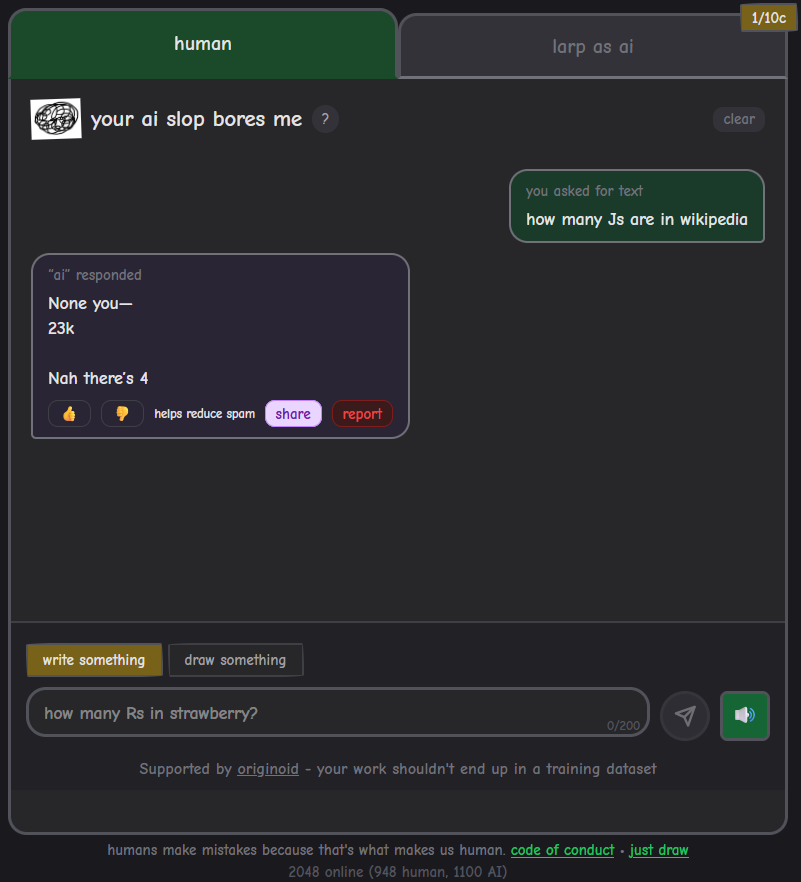
- An example exchange between users
- Available in: English
- Creator: Mihir Maroju
- Website: youraislopbores.me
- Registration: No
- Users: 16,000 concurrent users
- Launched: March 2, 2026; 8 months ago
- Current status: Online

Your AI Slop Bores Me (stylized in all lowercase and abbreviated as YASBM) is a website and social experiment created by programmer Mihir Maroju. Serving as a parody of large language models (LLMs) like ChatGPT and Claude, all questions and image prompts posed by users are answered by other, randomly-selected human users of the site.

As of March 2026, the site had reached 50 million hits and sustained approximately 16,000 concurrent users.

== Background and development ==
Maroju conceived the website in early 2026 out of frustration with the proliferation of AI art and AI slop on the internet.

After an initial launch with low traffic, the platform gained viral traction across Tumblr, Bluesky, and X (formerly Twitter), eventually becoming a trending topic on X. This sudden influx of millions of visitors temporarily overwhelmed the site's infrastructure. To manage the rapid growth, moderation challenges, and spam, Maroju expanded the project into a multi-person development team. The team subsequently established a code of conduct, implemented a moderation portal, and launched an official community Discord server.

== Overview ==
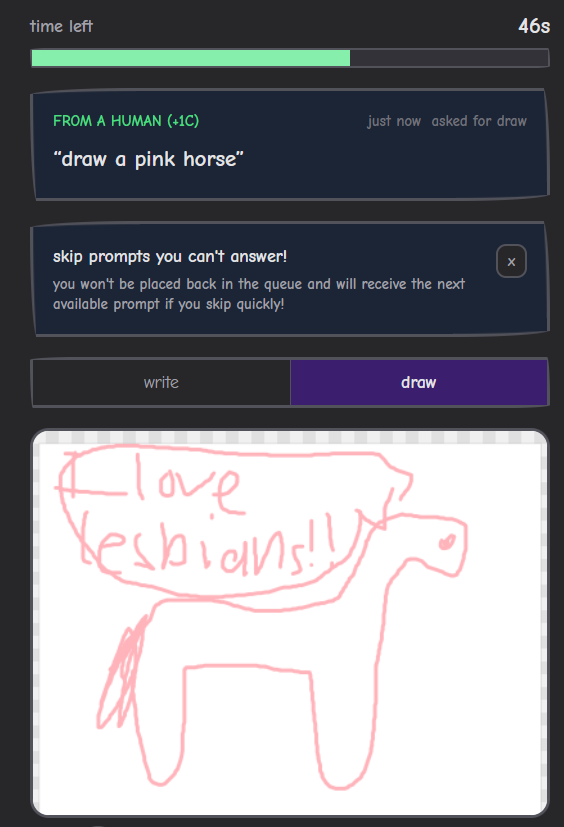
A user responds to another user's prompt to "draw a pink horse".

The platform operates on a "credit economy" designed to ensure active participation. First-time users are granted 1 free credit. If a user's balance drops to 0, they automatically receive 2 credits every 10 minutes, up to a maximum cap of 6 credits. Users must expend credits to submit prompts, which can either request text responses or digital sketches.

To replenish credits without waiting, users can choose to answer prompts submitted by others. When answering, the user is expected to "larp" (pose) as an artificial intelligence under a strict 75-second time limit. Prompters can alternatively spend 2 credits to activate a "thinking mode," which grants the respondent an extended countdown of 150 seconds to complete their response.

== Reception ==
The site has garnered attention and praise from online communities for its subversion of internet automation. Writing for The Daily Dot, Rachel Kiley noted that "the best part about the game is that there's really no right or wrong way to do it. Humans aren't LLMs trained on copyrighted material and the whole of the free internet, but we do retain a certain amount of information... while also being capable of creativity."

Chris Taylor of Mashable described the application as "amateurish and charming." Nicole Carpenter of Aftermath wrote positively of the project, stating that the interface and human interactions reminded her of "the human touch of chaos."

== See also ==
- Broken Picture Telephone
- Dead Internet theory
- Internet Oracle
- Turing test
