= Fior =

Fior may refer to:

== People ==
- Fior Vásquez (born 1977), Dominican shot putter
- Liza Fior (born 1962), British architect and designer
- Robin Fior (1935-2012), British designer

== Places ==
- San Fior, Treviso, Italy
