= Lath Branch =

Stream in Bourbon County, Kansas, U.S.

Coordinates: 37.852262°N 94.655793°W

Lath Branch is a stream in Bourbon County, Kansas, in the United States.

Lath Branch was named from the fact a pioneer craftsman has produced lath near this creek.

== See also ==
- List of rivers of Kansas
