= Lat-e Disar =

Lat-e Disar لاتديسر
- Village
- Country: Iran
- Province: Mazandaran
- County: Ramsar
- Bakhsh: Central
- Rural District: Sakht Sar

Population (2006)
  - Total: 30
- Time zone: UTC+3:30 (IRST)

Lat-e Disar (Persian: لاتديسر, also Romanized as Lāt-e Dīsar) is a village in Sakht Sar Rural District, in the Central District of Ramsar County, Mazandaran Province, Iran. At the 2016 census, its population was 16, in 8 families. Down from 30 in 2006.
