= Wey Latte =

Compact luxury crossover SUV produced by Great Wall Motors

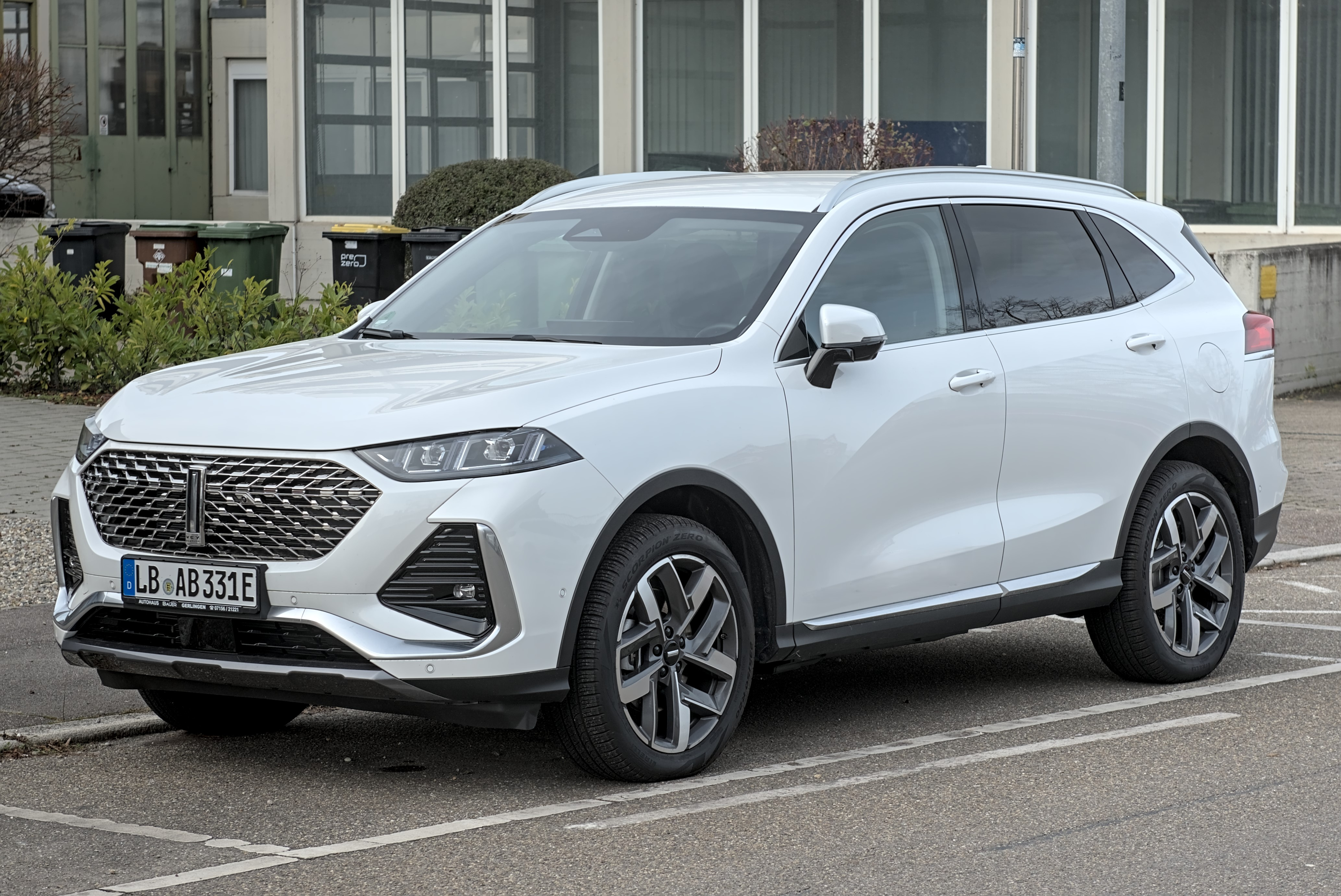

Overview
- Manufacturer: Great Wall Motor
- Also called: Wey Coffee 02 (Europe until end of 2023); GWM Wey 03 (Europe starting 2024)
- Production: 2021–2025 (China); 2023–present (export)
- Assembly: China: Tianjin

Body and chassis
- Class: Compact luxury crossover SUV
- Body style: 5-door SUV
- Layout: Front-engine, front-wheel-drive or all-wheel-drive

Powertrain
- Engine: 2.0 L E20N I4 (turbo petrol); 1.5 L GWM4B15D I4 (petrol Hybrid); 1.5 L GW4B15 GDIT EVO I4 (turbo petrol Hybrid)
- Electric motor: 100, 130 kW DHT100/DHT130 BorgWarner permanent magnet synchronous 85 kW BorgWarner permanent magnet synchronous
- Transmission: 9-speed DCT; Multi-mode DHT (Hybrid)
- Hybrid drivetrain: Power-split Hybrid (Latte Hybrid) plug-in hybrid (Latte PHEV)
- Battery: 1.6 kWh Li-ion (Hybrid); 45 kWh Li-ion (PHEV)
- Range: 600 km (373 mi)

Dimensions
- Wheelbase: 2,745 mm (108.1 in)
- Length: 4,668 mm (183.8 in)
- Width: 1,890 mm (74.4 in)
- Height: 1,730 mm (68.1 in)

Chronology
- Predecessor: Wey VV5

The Wey Latte (Chinese: 魏牌拿铁; pinyin: Wèipái Nátiě) is a compact luxury crossover SUV produced by Great Wall Motor under the premium brand, Wey.

== Overview ==
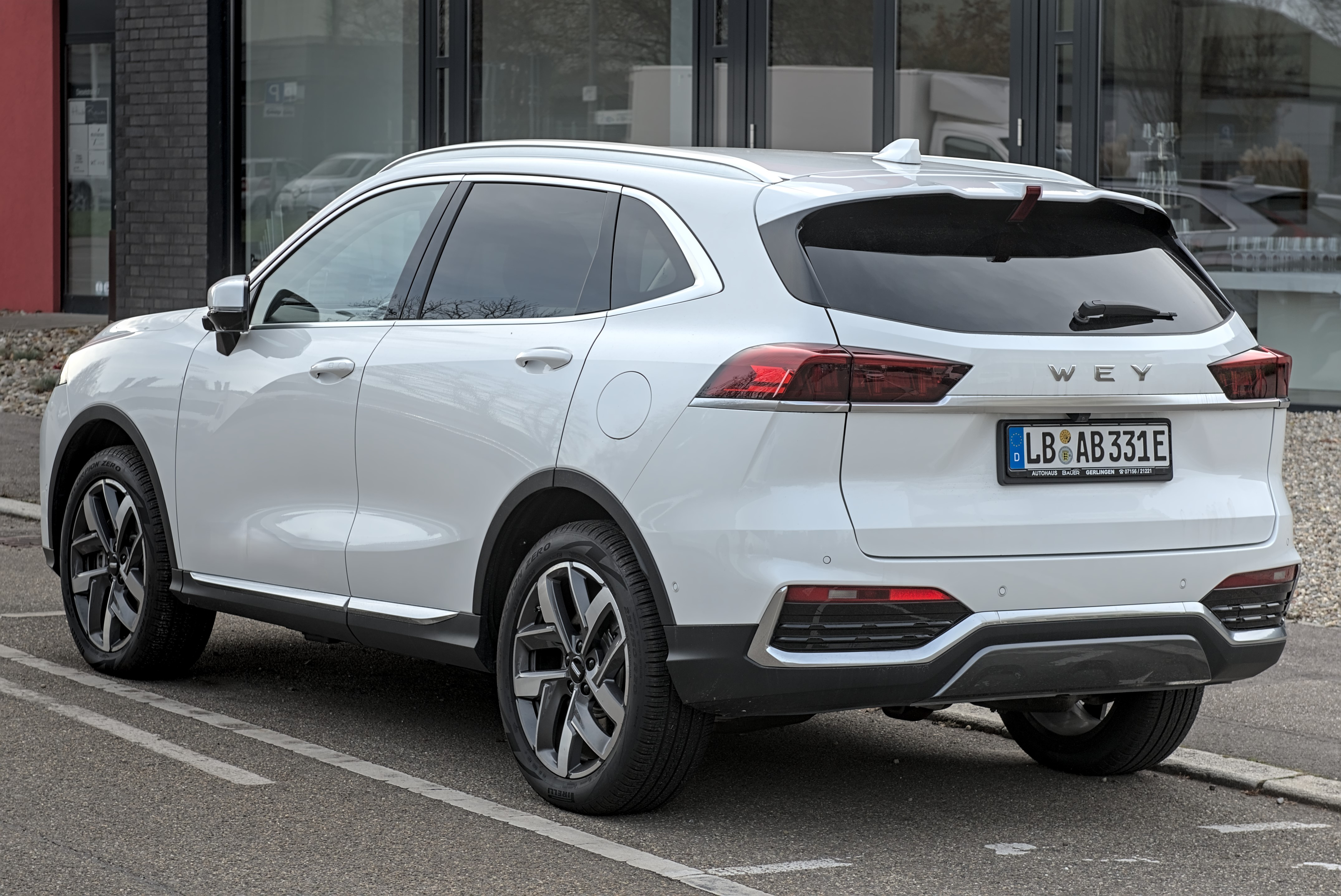
Rear view

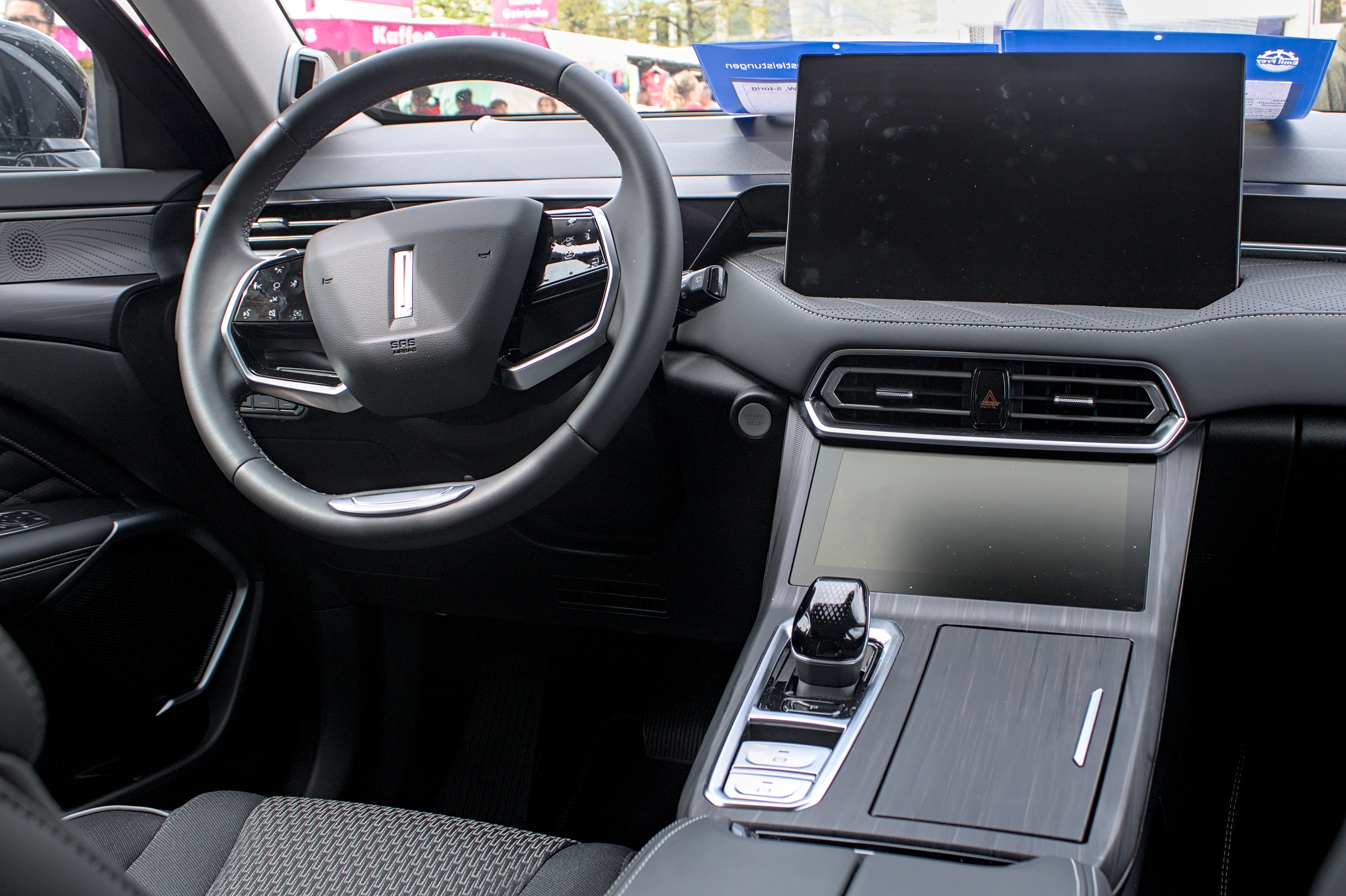
Interior

The Latte was presented during the Shanghai Auto Show in 2021. Sales started in April 2021 at Auto Shanghai in the Mainland Chinese market.

The crossover SUV is named after the latte coffee. With the Mocha and the Macchiato, two other vehicles of the brand named after coffee specialties were also presented at Auto Shanghai.

At the IAA in Munich in September 2021, Great Wall Motor presented the version for the European market as the Wey Coffee 02. From 2023, the model was meant to be marketed in Germany.

=== Powertrain ===
The Latte compact crossover is equipped with a 2.0-litre turbocharged inline-four engine code-named E20N. The four-cylinder engine uses a Miller cycle design with a thermal efficiency of over 38% and a maximum power output of 213 hp (159 kW; 216 PS). In terms of transmission, it is mated to a 9-speed wet dual-clutch gearbox developed inhouse by Great Wall. A 1.5-litre turbocharged inline-four engine with the Intelligent hybrid DHT technology is also available. The 1.5-litre turbo engine powertrain focuses on the economy of urban use scenarios, and supports working modes such as pure EV driving, hybrid drive, series drive, energy recovery and idle charging. The system achieves a total power of 175 kW (235 hp; 238 PS), 530 N⋅m (391 lb⋅ft; 54.0 kg⋅m) of torque, acceleration from 0–100 km/h (0–62 mph) 7.5 seconds, and 4.9 L/100 km (58 mpg_{‑imp}; 48 mpg_{‑US}) of fuel economy.

=== Safety ===
Euro NCAP test results GWM Wey Coffee 02 2.0 Hybrid Prestige (LHD) (2022)
Test	Points	%
Overall:	5 /5 stars	
Adult occupant:	35.8	94%
Child occupant:	43	87%
Pedestrian:	39.6	73%
Safety assist:	15	93%

== Sales ==
Year	China
2023	2,889
2024	357
2025	241
