= Intersection capacity utilization =

Intersection Capacity Utilization
- Created: 2000
- Author: Industry Scholars
- Purpose: To provide a Method to evaluate an intersection

Intersection Capacity Utilization (ICU) method is a tool for measuring a roadway intersection's capacity. It is ideal for transportation planning applications such as roadway design, congestion management programs and traffic impact studies. It is not intended for traffic operations or signal timing design. ICU is also defined as "the sum of the ratios of approach volume divided by approach capacity for each leg of intersection which controls overall traffic signal timing plus an allowance for clearance times." The ICU tells how much reserve capacity is available or how much the intersection is overcapacity. The ICU does not predict delay, but it can be used to predict how often an intersection will experience congestion.

The method by which the ICU is used shows what the ICU is about. The ICU uses a grading system to rank the intersection that is being studied. This ranking system is known as the Level of Service (LOS) for the intersection. ICU is timing plan independent, yet has rules to ensure that minimum timing constraints are taken into account. This removes the choice of timing plan from the capacity results. The ICU can also be used on uncontrolled intersections to determine the capacity utilization if the intersection were to be signalized. The ICU is not intended for operations or signal timing design. The primary output from ICU is similar to the intersection volume to capacity ratio. Some of the benefits to using ICU over delay-based methods include greater accuracy, and a clear image of the intersection's volume to capacity ratio.

ICU method has been subject to some competition from the Highway Capacity Manual (HCM). Both methods are used to determine the LOS of an intersection. However, each method has different criteria for the rankings. In transportation, each method is used for different types of projects. The review board of the ICU continue to make changes every year in order to incorporate all of the new criteria required.

The ICU has not been designed for operations and signal timing design. Delay based methods and simulation such as HCM, PTV Vistro, Synchro, and SimTraffic should be used for operations and signal timing design. In short, the ICU method makes the traffic capacity design a much easier and simpler task.

== Methodology ==
The ICU methodology requires a specific set of data to be collected. The data needs to include volumes, number of lanes, saturated flow rates, signal timings, reference cycle length, and lost time for an intersection. The method sums the amount of time required to serve all movements at saturation for a given cycle length and divides by that reference cycle length. This method is similar to taking a sum of critical volume to saturation flow ratios (v/s), yet allows minimum timings to be considered. The ICU method uses the Level of Service concept, in which reports on the amount of reserved capacity or capacity deficit. In order to calculate the Level of Service for the ICU method, the ICU for an intersection must be computed first. ICU can be computed by:

ICU = sum(max (tMin, v/si) * CL + tLi) / CL = Intersection Capacity Utilization

CL = Reference Cycle Length

tLi = Lost time for critical movement

v/si = volume to saturation flow rate, critical movement

tMin = minimum green time, critical movement i

Once the ICU is fully calculated for an intersection, the ICU LOS for that intersection can be calculated based on the following criteria:

Level of Service

A: If ICU is less than or equal to 55%

B: If ICU is greater than 55% but less than 64%

C: If ICU is greater than 64% but less than 73%

D: If ICU is greater than 73% but less than 82%

E: If ICU is greater than 82% but less than 91%

F: If ICU is greater than 91% but less than 100%

G: If ICU is greater than 100% but less than 109%

H: If ICU is greater than 109%

This grading criteria shows some specific details about the specific intersection:

A: Intersection has no congestion

B: Intersection has very little congestion

C: Intersection has no major congestion

D: Intersection normally has no congestion

E: Intersection is on the verge of congested conditions

F: Intersection is over capacity and likely experiences congestion periods of 15 to 60 consecutive minutes.

G: Intersection is 9% over capacity and experiences congestion periods of 60 to 120 consecutive minutes.

H: The intersection is 9% or greater over capacity and could experience congestion periods of over 120 minutes per day.

Most industry standards require the ICU LOS to be E or better. This is not always easy to achieve and therefore much care is given to the signal timings and geometry in order to get the LOS to be better than E.

== ICU versus HCM ==
HCM method is seen today as the more popular alternative when it comes to capacity analysis. The HCM is based on the estimated delay for an intersection. While the ICU design is compatible with the HCM design, the volume adjusted for ICU are the same as required by the HCM design. If an intersection design satisfies the HCM design, then it most definitely satisfies the Level of Service (LOS) required by the ICU.

The LOS calculated for the ICU method is often confused with the LOS calculated for the HCM method. While both LOS provide information about the performance of the intersection, the specific way in which each of these methods grade an intersection is different. The HCM LOS is delay based while the ICU LOS reports the amount of reserve capacity or capacity deficit.

Some signal timing software like PTV Vistro and Synchro report ICU Level of Service. The Level of Service is reported on a scale ranging from A to H, A being the least congested condition and H being the worst condition.

== Software ==
In order to do the ICU calculations, it is very useful to use a computer software that allows you to put in the volumes and it calculates the LOS for that particular intersection. In order to perform this function, however, complete data must be collected and the intersection lane geometry must also be known. If these things are known, then the calculation for LOS becomes very easy.

PTV Vistro, developed by PTV Group, has integrated the Intersection Capacity Utilization (ICU) into the software, for both the ICU1 and ICU2 methods. This integration allows users to analyze small to large signalized urban networks in a modern traffic analysis software platform. Using the ICU methods in PTV Vistro can be extremely useful for planning level analyses and help users determine intersection size and capacity. PTV Vistro includes an ICU check that verifies that the basic parameters needed to perform the ICU calculation have been entered for each intersection. In addition, the ICU evaluations are compatible with PTV Visum to develop macroscopic-level simulations.

Other software used in the industry include Synchro 5.0 and SimTraffic. Both of these software are produced by Trafficware Ltd. and thus they both work very similar to each other. Synchro 5.0, the LOS analysis software, also calculates Intersection Capacity Utilization (ICU) which provides additional insight as to how well an intersection is functioning and how much extra capacity is available to handle future growth, traffic fluctuation and incidents. The ICU calculation does not use existing signal timings or sign control. It simply calculates the ultimate capacity based on a fully protected, optimized signalized timing plan at a cycle length of 120 seconds.

== Uses ==
Intersection Capacity Utilization method is most often found in a traffic impact study (TIS). TIS is prepared mostly by city officials and/or private civil consulting firms. The importance of TIS is often seen when there is a new building being constructed in a downtown area. When there is a building that is going to be built in a specific area, a TIS is prepared to see the impact this new facility will have on the intersections around this facility. Old traffic patterns are evaluated along with the new predicted volumes for the intersections. Old geometry is also evaluated to see if it needs to be changed according to the new demand in traffic for the specific intersections in question. The ICU method of finding the LOS is a tool that is often emphasized in the TIS reports to show how the intersections can be made better to accommodate the new flux of traffic.
