= Late =

Late or LATE may refer to:

== Everyday usage ==
- Tardy, or late, not being on time
- Late (or the late) may refer to a person who is dead

== Music ==
- Late (The 77s album), 2000
- Late (Alvin Batiste album), 1993
- Late!, a pseudonym used by Dave Grohl on his Pocketwatch album
- Late (rapper), an underground rapper from Wolverhampton
- "Late", a song by Kanye West from Late Registration

== Other uses ==
- Late (Tonga), an uninhabited volcanic island southwest of Vavaʻu in the kingdom of Tonga
- "Late" (Dawson's Creek), a 2001 television episode
- "Late" (The Handmaid's Tale), a 2017 television episode
- LaTe, Oy Laivateollisuus Ab, a defunct shipbuilding company
- Limbic-predominant age-related TDP-43 encephalopathy, a proposed form of dementia
- Local-authority trading enterprise, a New Zealand business law
- Local average treatment effect, a concept in econometrics
- Late, a synonym for cooler in stellar classification

== See also ==
- Lates, a genus of fish in the lates perch family
- Later (disambiguation)
- Latte (disambiguation)
