= Lattès map =

In mathematics, a Lattès map is a rational map f = ΘLΘ^{−1} from the complex sphere to itself such that Θ is a holomorphic map from a complex torus to the complex sphere and L is an affine map z → az + b from the complex torus to itself.

Lattès maps are named after French mathematician Samuel Lattès, who wrote about them in 1918.
