= Lat. =

Lat. may stand for:

- Latin, in dictionaries and glosses
- Latitude, in geo-coordinates

== See also ==
- Lat (disambiguation)
