= Schooner (disambiguation) =

A schooner is a type of sailing vessel.

Schooner may also refer to:

- Schooner (glass), a British large sherry glass, or an Australian beer glass
- Schooner Lager, a Canadian beer brand
- Schooner Channel, formerly Schooner Passage, in British Columbia, Canada
- Schooner Creek, a stream in Indiana, United States
- Schooner Hotel, in Alnmouth, Northumberland, England

== See also ==
- Covered wagon, or prairie schooner
- Allison Harbour, or False Schooner Passage, in British Columbia, Canada
