= See You Again (disambiguation) =

"See You Again" is a 2015 song by Wiz Khalifa featuring Charlie Puth.

See You Again may also refer to:

- "See You Again" (Miley Cyrus song), 2007
- "See You Again" (Carrie Underwood song), 2013
- "See You Again" (Tyler, the Creator song), 2017
- "See You Again", a 2012 song by Loreen from Heal
- "See You Again", a 2013 song by I Am I
- "See You Again", a 2015 song by Elle King from Love Stuff
- "See You Again", a 2019 song by Monsta X from Follow: Find You
- "See You Again", a 2022 song by Kid Rock from Bad Reputation
- "See You Again", a 2022 song by Years & Years from Night Call
- "See You Again", a 2023 song by The Chainsmokers, Illenium, and Carlie Hanson
- See You Again (2019 TV series), a Chinese television series
- See You Again (2022 TV series), a Chinese television series

== See also ==
- "I'll See You Again", a 2009 song by Westlife from Where We Are
- "If I Never See You Again", a 1997 song by Wet Wet Wet
- When I See You Again, Taiwanese romantic comedy television series
- "When Can I See You Again?", a 2012 song by Owl City from Wreck-It Ralph
