= I Can See You =

I Can See You may refer to:

- I Can See You (film), a 2008 American film written and directed by Graham Reznick
- I Can See You (TV series), a Philippine TV series broadcast by GMA Network
- I Can See You (EP), by Black Flag, 1989
- "I Can See You" (song), by Taylor Swift from the album Speak Now (Taylor's Version), 2023
- "I Can See You", a song by Black Flag from the album In My Head, 1985
- "I Can See You", a song by Uriah Heep from the album Into the Wild, 2011
- "I Can See You", a song by Thaikkudam Bridge from the album Namah, 2019
