= Lath, Rajkot =

Lath
- city
- Location in Gujarat, India Lath (India)
- Coordinates: 21.65°N 70.21°E
- Country: India
- State: Gujarat
- District: Rajkot
- Elevation: 137 m (449 ft)

Languages
  - Official: Gujarati, Hindi
- Time zone: UTC+5:30 (IST)
- Vehicle registration: GJ
- Website: gujaratindia.com

Lath is a village under the tehsil of Upleta in the Indian state of Gujarat.

== Geography ==
Lath is located at 21.65°N 70.17°E. Lath is located at a distance of 94.05 km from its District Main City Rajkot. It is located at a distance of 308 km from its State Capital Gandhinagar.

== History ==
Lath is an ancient village with no other villages under the town panchayat. The head of the town is known as the Sarpanch and makes all the administrative and judicial decisions under his/her prerogative. The current Sarpanch is a woman. Most Patel families are in this town, such as Bhalani, Nadpara, Gardhariya, Makwana, Kansagara, etc. There is only one Brahmin in the entire village who performs certain religious rites of Hinduism. The town is known mainly for Lathiya Chudasama and Rajput Families. Many Jain Gujarati families like Lathiya and Karghatda Desai have their ancestral hometowns in this small village. Both of these families have another branch of their family tree emerging from Lath, Gujarat and Jetpur, respectively.

This village has had a primary school since the British times. Today, Lath has a primary and secondary school, electricity and Airtel Mobile phone tower available. In this village, two banks are available. One is Bank of Baroda, and the other is Rajkot District Co-operative Bank. This village has a BSNL telecom office. Villages near Lath see it as a good option for school education. The Bhalani family was known as the wealthiest in the area. According to local legends, they were considered the wealthiest businessmen of their time. As you enter the village, their grand house is easily visible from the main road.

Yet, to the outside world, Lath is so small and remote that it is often referred to as "Lath Bhimora." Bhimora is the nearest village to Lath, at a distance of 2.883 km.

== Schools Nearby Lath ==
1. Kanya Taluka School
2. Bhimora Primary School
3. J.M.K.H
4. Mojira Primary School
