= Samuel Lattès =

French mathematician

Samuel Lattès (21 February 1873 (Nice) – 5 July 1918) was a French mathematician.

From 1892 to 1895 he studied at the École Normale Superieure. After this he was a teacher in Algiers, Dijon and Nice. After a promotion to Paris in 1906 he moved first to Montpellier in 1908 and then to Besançon, before he took up a professorship at the University of Toulouse in 1911.

In 1910, he married physicist Jeanne Ferrier, a former student of his, and they had a daughter together.

He died of typhus in 1918.

Today Lattès is best known for his work on complex sets, particularly for examples of rational functions including the Riemann sphere in its Julia set. Today these examples are described as Lattès maps or Lattès examples.

== See also ==
- Pierre Fatou
- Gaston Julia
- Lattès map

== Bibliography ==
- Adolphe Buhl: Éloge des Samuel Lattès. Mémoires de l'Academie des Sciences, Inscriptions et Belles-Lettres de Toulouse, Band 9, 1921, S. 1–13.
- Michèle Audin (2009), Fatou, Julia, Montel, le grand prix des sciences mathématiques de 1918, et après … (in French), Springer, ISBN 978-3-642-00445-2; English translation: Michèle Audin (2011), Fatou, Julia, Montel, The Great Prize of Mathematical Sciences of 1918, and Beyond (in German), Springer, ISBN 978-3-642-17853-5
