= Sooner or Later (Larry Davis album) =

Studio album by Larry Davis
- Released: 1992
- Studio: Ardent
- Genre: Blues
- Label: Bullseye Blues
- Producer: Ron Levy

Larry Davis chronology
I Ain't Beggin' Nobody (1987)	Sooner or Later (1992)	Sweet Little Angel: B.B. King Presents Larry Davis (2002)

Sooner or Later is the final studio album by the American musician Larry Davis, released in 1992. He supported it with a few live dates. Sooner or Later won a 1993 Living Blues award as one of three best "modern" blues albums.

== Production ==
Recorded at Ardent Studios, the album was produced by Ron Levy, who also contributed on organ. Davis, who was influenced primarily by former labelmate Bobby "Blue" Bland, cowrote three of the songs. He was more comfortable playing guitar on stage than in a studio, and mostly ceded those recording duties to others. Davis was backed by the Memphis Horns on some of the tracks. "Little Rock" is an instrumental. "How Could You Do It to Me" is a cover of the Little Milton song. "How Long" is a version of Howlin' Wolf's "Baby How Long".

== Critical reception ==
Professional ratings
Review scores
Source	Rating
All Music Guide	5/5 stars
The Encyclopedia of Popular Music	3/5 stars
The Grove Press Guide to the Blues on CD	3.5/5 stars
MusicHound Blues: The Essential Album Guide	4.5/5 stars
The Penguin Guide to Blues Recordings	3/4 stars
The Philadelphia Inquirer	3.5/4 stars
The Rolling Stone Jazz & Blues Album Guide	4/5 stars
The State	3/5 stars

The New York Times said that Davis "has a deep, smooth voice that conveys both passion and weariness, crinkling and tearing at just the right places... And his guitar playing has a snakelike, greasy quality to it." The Courier-Journal noted that Davis "is comfortable with any style blues, from shuffle to slow burn." The Philadelphia Inquirer stated that Davis "favors suavely delivered sophisticated blues". The Rocket said that Sooner or Later "finds Davis in prime shape, equally at home with slow weepers and soul chargers." The Santa Cruz Sentinel listed it among the best albums of 1992. MusicHound Blues: The Essential Album Guide labeled it "an under-appreciated classic".

== Track listing ==
No.	Title	Length
1.	"How Could You Do It to Me"
2.	"I'm Workin' on It"
3.	"Penitentiary Blues"
4.	"You'll Need Another Favor"
5.	"Help the Poor"
6.	"Letter from My Darling"
7.	"Goin' Out West (Part 1 and Part 2)"
8.	"102nd St. Blues"
9.	"How Long"
10.	"Little Bluebird"
11.	"Little Rock"
