= Marolles-les-Braults =

- Commune
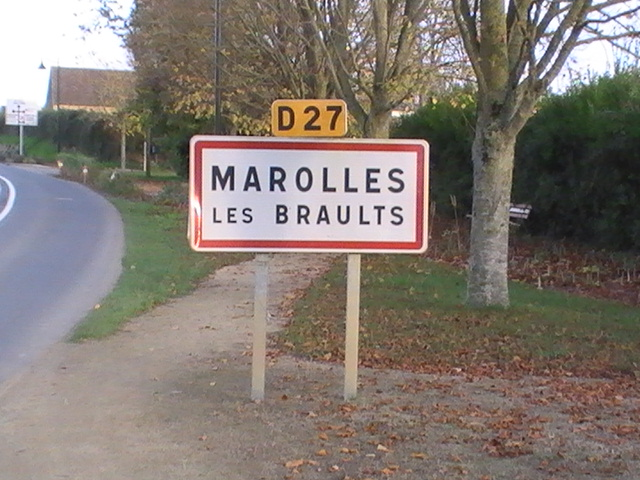
- A road sign at the entry to Marolles-les-Braults
- Location of Marolles-les-Braults
- Location within France Location within Pays de la Loire
- Coordinates: 48°15′11″N 0°18′54″E
- Country: France
- Region: Pays de la Loire
- Department: Sarthe
- Arrondissement: Mamers
- Canton: Mamers
- Intercommunality: Maine Saosnois

Government
  - Mayor (2020–2026): Francis Belluau
- Area^{1}: 24.19 km^{2} (9.34 sq mi)
- Highest elevation: 127 m (417 ft)
- Lowest elevation: 57 m (187 ft)
- Population (2023): 2,039
  - Density: 84.29/km^{2} (218.3/sq mi)
- Demonym(s): Marollais, Marollaise
- Time zone: UTC+01:00 (CET)
  - Summer (DST): UTC+02:00 (CEST)
- INSEE/Postal code: 72189 /72260
- ^{1} French Land Register data, which excludes lakes, ponds, glaciers > 1 km^{2} (0.386 sq mi or 247 acres) and river estuaries.

Marolles-les-Braults (French pronunciation: [maʁɔl le bʁo]) is a commune in the Sarthe department in the region of Pays de la Loire in north-western France. On 1 January 2019, the former commune Dissé-sous-Ballon was merged into Marolles-les-Braults.

== Population ==
Historical population
Year	Pop.	±% p.a.
1968	2,031	—
1975	1,831	−1.47%
1982	1,951	+0.91%
1990	2,018	+0.42%
1999	2,229	+1.11%
2007	2,307	+0.43%
2012	2,271	−0.31%
2017	2,205	−0.59%
2023	2,039	−1.30%
Source: INSEE

== See also ==
- Communes of the Sarthe department
