= Claudius Regaud =

French physician and biologist (1870–1940)

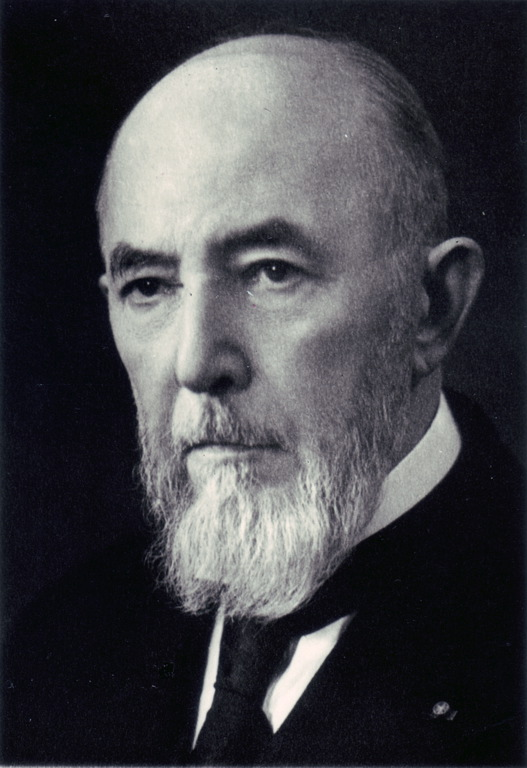
- Born: January 30, 1870; Lyon, France
- Died: December 29, 1940 (aged 70); Couzon-au-Mont-d'Or, France
- Occupations: Doctor and Biologist
- Known for: Founder of the Curie Institute of Paris

Claudius François Regaud (30 January 1870 – 29 December 1940) was a French physician and biologist. He was one of the pioneers in radiotherapy at the Curie Institute.

== Scientific work ==
In 1906, Regaud discovered that one of the effects of X-ray treatment is sterility. He deduced that X-rays could also be used against rapidly growing cells other than gametes and, thus, against cancerous tumors. He proceeded to conduct the first experiments in this area. In 1912, at the Curie Institute, he was given responsibility for the Pasteur Laboratory, with the mission to study the biological and medical effects of radioactivity. The Curie laboratory, in contrast, dealt with research in the fields of physics and chemistry.

In addition, he started a program to fight neoplasia and conducted research to determine the optimal duration and dosage for radiation therapy.
