= Joseph Rollet =

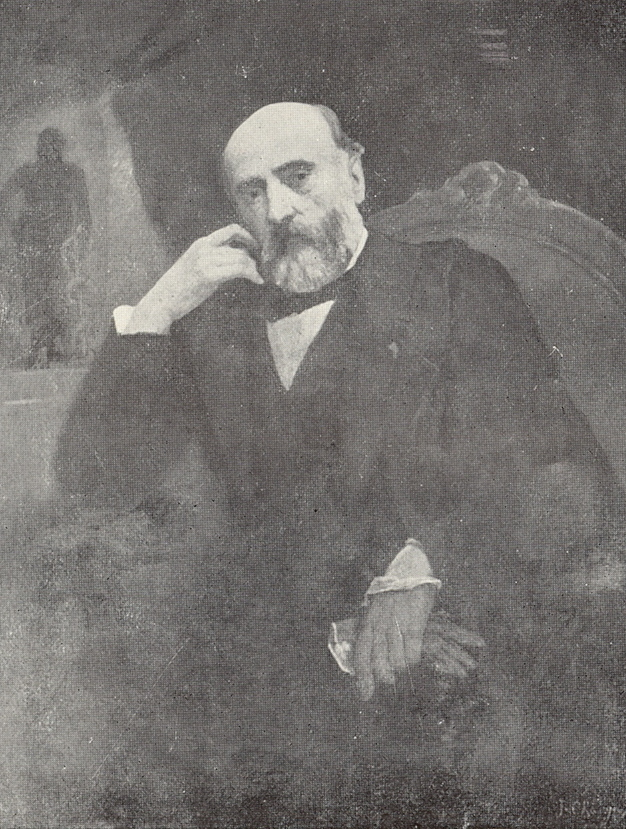
Portrait by Jean-Baptiste Chatigny

Pierre Joseph Martin Rollet or Martin-Pierre-Joseph Rollet (12 November 1824 – 2 August 1894) was a French surgeon, venereologist and dermatologist who served as a professor of hygiene at the Faculty of Medicine in Lyon. He was the first to separate chancroid and indurated syphilitic chancre and established that the incubation period for syphilis was three weeks.

Rollet was born in Lagnieu, son of a postmaster. He was sent to the Meximieux seminary at the age of nine and then went to the Royal College of Lyon before going to study medicine at the Medical School in Lyon. He then transferred to Paris. He became an intern in 1845 at the Beaujon Hospital under Stanislas Laugier. He hoped to become a surgeon at Hôtel Dieu but finally was admitted to the École de Antiquaille in 1850. He however joined service only in 1855, practicising in own clinic on rue Claudio in dermato-venerology for five years. In the nine years that he served, he specialized in syphilis. He was able to demonstrate that Philippe Ricord had confounded two diseases, the infection caused by a combination of Treponema pallidum and Haemophilus ducreyi, and true syphilis. In 1877 he was appointed to the chair of hygiene at the newly founded Faculty of Medicine at Lyon.

Rollet married Jullieron, daughter of notary Roanne in 1855. They had a son who became an ophthalmologist and a daughter who in her second marriage wed Alexandre Lacassagne, a forensic medicine pioneer. Rollet was made Knight of the Legion of Honor in 1864. Rollet died suddenly, he was to deliver a speech the next day while presiding over the Congress of Dermato-venerology in Lyon. He was buried at Beynost.
