= Cover your ass =

Phrase meaning to protect oneself from repercussions

"Cover your ass" (British: "cover your arse" ), abbreviated CYA, is a phrase that describes an activity done by individuals to protect themselves from possible subsequent criticism, legal penalties, or other repercussions, usually in a work-related or bureaucratic context. In one sense, it may be rightful steps to protect oneself properly while in a difficult situation, such as what steps to take to protect oneself after being fired. But, in a different sense, it may describe "the bureaucratic technique of averting future accusations of policy error or wrongdoing by deflecting responsibility in advance". It often involves diffusing responsibility for one's actions as a form of insurance against possible future negative repercussions. It can denote a type of institutional risk-averse mentality which works against transparency, accountability and responsibility, often characterized by excessive paperwork and documentation, which can be harmful to the institution's overall effectiveness. The activity, sometimes seen as instinctive, is generally unnecessary towards accomplishing the goals of the organization, but helpful to protect a particular individual's career within it, and it may be seen as a type of institutional corruption working against individual initiative.

== Usage ==
The phrase cover your ass is generally viewed as a vulgar term, often replaced by the less-vulgar sounding initials CYA. William Safire identified CYA as being a synecdoche, in the same sense that the word "ass" had come to reference the whole person. The word "ass" in the phrase is often replaced with more polite versions or other euphemisms, such as "cover your actions", "cover your rear end", "cover your back", or "cover your butt", according to Safire. The "cover your butt" variant has been used in various way including by Minnesota health authorities urging citizens to undergo preventive colorectal exams, as a way to "cover" themselves medically from possible future cancer. In banking, officers tasked with making sure the bank follows proper regulatory procedures, called compliance officers, may realize that certain dubious transactions, such as money laundering and terrorist financing, will occur regardless of any regulatory restrictions; still, to protect themselves and their banks against possible future sanctions, they may engage in CYA activity such as issuing unnecessary memos, obfuscating documents or conducting transactions discreetly, as ways to absolve themselves from possible future liability. The term is widely used in journalism. Safire said that the term is used in bureaucracy:

A bureaucrat adept at C.Y.A. (a) likes to employ passive constructions (see mistakes were made), (b) follows up a meeting or phone call with a self-serving memcon—"memorandum of conversation", (c) routes memos to and through as many other bureaucrats as possible, thereby spreading the risk of future criticism, and (d) "papers the file" with memoranda sometimes supporting and sometimes contradicting his or her position.

In the novel The Negotiator by Frederick Forsyth, an English author, CYA is mentioned:

There was silence. America has some of the most sophisticated alarm systems in the world. Her scientists have developed infrared sensors that can detect body heat from several miles above the earth’s surface; there are noise sensors that can hear a mouse breathe at a mile; there are movement and light sensors to pick up a cigarette stub from inner space. But no system in the entire arsenal can match the CYA sensor system that operates in Washington. It had already been in action for two hours and now was headed for peak performance.

Because the practices are so routine, a genuine warning can be mistaken for CYA behavior, causing a type II error or false-negative error, with disastrous results. For example in the summer preceding the attacks of 9/11, President George W. Bush was briefed about a now-famous August 6, 2001, memo titled Bin Ladin Determined To Strike in US. Bush's response to the briefer was erroneously reported as: "All right. You've covered your ass, now."

In another example, before the launch of the United States spaceship Challenger which ended tragically with the Space Shuttle Challenger disaster, the final launch approval by rocket maker Morton Thiokol contained the phrase "information on this page was prepared to support an oral presentation and cannot be considered complete without the oral discussion"; this notice was later described as a "CYA notice" by Edward Tufte, an information design specialist. In print, it may have the form of a disclaimer; for example, Slate suggested that the White House used the phrase "It is important not to read too much into any one monthly report" as a disclaimer on reports, and this was described as a CYA activity. The term has been applied in the medical profession to describe doctors who prescribe unnecessary medical tests for patients, to protect themselves against possible future lawsuits. The term has been used to describe a cultural tendency which works against accountability and risk-taking including in a war effort when generals engage in much cover your ass activity which avoids taking real responsibility.

In regards to Congressional impeachment hearings about President Donald Trump's talks with Ambassador Gordon Sondland, on October 16, 2019, Member of Congress Jackie Speier (D-Calif.) told reporters that she was not sure whether lawmakers could trust Sondland's testimony to the House, saying his opening statement was "a lot of CYA." In an op-ed's inferred example regarding Trump's speech prior to the 2021 storming of the United States Capitol, The Washington Post columnist Dana Milbank juxtaposed two of Trump's statements as evidence:

"You'll never take back our country with weakness, you have to show strength and you have to be strong," he admonished them, with CYA instructions to make themselves heard "peacefully and patriotically."

In Cambodia under the Khmer Rouge, the government never had any idea how much food was actually being grown, because local bureaucrats "covered their asses" and lied to make themselves look good avoiding getting shot. Consequently, starvation was rampant.

== See also ==
- Due diligence
- Mistakes were made
- Plausible deniability
- Principal–agent problem
