= LART =

Single-board computer released in 2000

- Manufacturer: Delft University of Technology
- Released: 2000
- Memory: 32 MB DRAM
- Storage: 4 MB Flash ROM
- Website: www.lartmaker.nl

LART is a single-board computer (SBC) designed by staff of the University of Delft/Netherlands.

The creators advertise complete layout by means of CAD files, software and kernel patches for Linux. The software is released under the terms of the GNU General Public License (GPL), and the Hardware design is released under the MIT License. TU Delft built some boards, some people built their own LARTs (the board can be made at home by a competent engineer), and a batch was produced and sold in 2002-2003 by Aleph One Ltd and Remote 12, in an early demonstration of the viability of the Open Hardware concept (manufacture can be performed by groups other than the designers and copyright holders).

The standard LART configuration featured 32 MB DRAM and 4 MB Flash ROM. Most interesting is the low-power consumption of less than 1 W while providing ~ 250 MIPS, making it an ideal system for embedded computing.

The project also spun off an Open Hardware parallel port JTAG interface board and the Blob bootloader.
