= See You Later (disambiguation) =

See You Later is an album by Vangelis.

See You Later may also refer to:

- "See You Later", a song by Heatmiser from Mic City Sons
- "See You Later", a song by Soul Asylum from Candy from a Stranger
- "See you later", an informal parting phrase.

== See also ==
- "See You Later Alligator", a song by Bill Haley & His Comets
- See You Later, Alligator (novel), a novel by William F. Buckley, Jr.
- See Ya Later Gladiator, a 1968 Looney Tunes animated short
- "See U Later", a song by Blackpink from Square Up
