= List of awards and nominations received by Stevie Ray Vaughan =

Stevie Ray Vaughan awards and nominations
Awards and nominations
Award	Wins	Nominations
Grammy	6	12
Austin Music Awards	10	33
W. C. Handy Awards	5	6

Totals (Note: Certain award groups do not simply award one winner. They acknowledge several different recipients, have runners-up, and have third place. Since this is a specific recognition and is different from losing an award, runner-up mentions are considered wins in this award tally. For simplification and to avoid errors, each award in this list has been presumed to have had a prior nomination.)
- Wins: 21
- Nominations: 51

This is a list of awards received by American blues guitarist Stevie Ray Vaughan. He debuted on the music scene in 1983 as the frontman of Double Trouble. Through his group and collaborative work, he became one of the first musicians to be inducted into the Austin Music Hall of Fame in 1982. He was also inducted into the Blues Hall of Fame in 2000. Winning many magazine polls, the guitarist was honored by former Texas governor Mark White in 1985. Vaughan has won 6 Grammy Awards, 10 Austin Music Awards, and 5 W. C. Handy Awards, being nominated for "Best Contemporary Blues Male Artist," as well as winning awards for "Entertainer of the Year" and "Instrumentalist of the Year."

== Grammy Awards ==
The Grammy Awards are awarded annually by the National Academy of Recording Arts and Sciences in the United States. Vaughan received 6 awards out of 13 nominations.

Year	Nominee / work	Award	Result
1984	"Texas Flood"	Best Traditional Blues Performance	Nominated
1984	"Rude Mood"	Best Rock Instrumental Performance	Nominated
1985	"Voodoo Child (Slight Return)"	Best Rock Instrumental Performance	Nominated
1985	Blues Explosion	Best Traditional Blues Performance	Won
1986	"Say What!"	Best Rock Instrumental Performance	Nominated
1988	"Pipeline"	Best Rock Instrumental Performance	Nominated
1988	"Say What" (live version)	Best Rock Instrumental Performance	Nominated
1990	In Step	Best Contemporary Blues Performance	Won
1990	"Travis Walk"	Best Rock Instrumental Performance	Nominated
1991	Family Style	Best Contemporary Blues Performance	Won
1991	"D/FW"	Best Rock Instrumental Performance	Won
1993	The Sky Is Crying	Best Contemporary Blues Album	Won
1993	"Little Wing"	Best Rock Instrumental Performance	Won

== Austin Music Awards ==
The Austin Music Awards are presented annually in Austin by The Austin Chronicle. Vaughan has received 10 Austin Music Awards, along with an induction into the Austin Music Hall of Fame.

Year	Nominee / work	Award	Result
1983	Texas Flood	Album of the Year	Won
1983	"Love Struck Baby"	Best Single	Nominated
1983	"Pride and Joy"	Best Single	Nominated
1983	"Love Struck Baby"	Song of the Year	Nominated
1983	"Texas Flood"	Song of the Year	Nominated
1983	"Pride and Joy"	Song of the Year	Nominated
1984	Couldn't Stand the Weather	Album of the Year	Won
1984	"Cold Shot" / "Honey Bee"	Best Single	Nominated
1984	"Cold Shot"	Song of the Year	Nominated
1984	"Couldn't Stand the Weather"	Song of the Year	Nominated
1985	Soul to Soul	Album of the Year	Won
1985	"Change It" / "Look at Little Sister"	Best Single	Nominated
1985	"Change It"	Song of the Year	Nominated
1985	"Say What!"	Song of the Year	Nominated
1986	Live Alive	Album of the Year	Nominated
1986	"Willie the Wimp"	Song of the Year	Nominated
1989	In Step	Album of the Decade	Nominated
1989	In Step	Album of the Year	Won
1989	"Crossfire"	Best Single	Won
1989	"The House Is Rockin'"	Best Single	Nominated
1989	"Crossfire"	Song of the Decade	Nominated
1989	"Texas Flood"	Song of the Decade	Nominated
1989	"Crossfire"	Song of the Year	Won
1990	Family Style	Album of the Year	Won
1990	"Tick Tock"	Best Single	Won
1990	"White Boots"	Best Single	Nominated
1990	"Hard to Be"	Best Single	Nominated
1990	"Tick Tock"	Song of the Year	Won
1991	The Sky Is Crying	Album of the Year	Won
1991	"Life By the Drop"	Best 45	Nominated
1991	"The Sky Is Crying"	Best 45	Nominated
1992	In the Beginning	Album of the Year	Nominated

=== Austin Music Hall of Fame ===
Vaughan was one of the first inductees into the Austin Music Hall of Fame.

Year	Nominee / work	Award	Result
1982	Stevie Ray Vaughan	Hall of Fame	Inducted

== W. C. Handy Awards ==
Year	Nominee / work	Award	Result
1984	Stevie Ray Vaughan	Best Contemporary Blues Male Artist	Nominated
1984	Stevie Ray Vaughan	Entertainer of the Year	Won
1984	Stevie Ray Vaughan	Instrumentalist of the Year	Won
1985	Stevie Ray Vaughan	Instrumentalist of the Year	Won
2000	In Session	Blues Album of the Year	Won
2000	In Session	Contemporary Blues Album of the Year	Won

== Rock and Roll Hall of fame ==
Although he became eligible for the Rock and Roll Hall of Fame in 2008, he didn't appear on a nominations roster until 2014. In 2015, he, along with Double Trouble, were inducted into the Rock and Roll Hall of Fame. Jimmie Vaughan accepted the award on his behalf.
