= Pride and Joy (Stevie Ray Vaughan video) =

Video by Stevie Ray Vaughan
- Released: November 20, 1990
- Recorded: 1983–1990
- Genre: Blues
- Length: 70 minutes
- Label: Sony
- Director: Joe Butts, D.J. Webster, Charlie Rice, Josh Aronson, Larry Jordan, Phil Tucket, Allie Eberhardt
- Producer: Dale Ward, Julie Kaufman-Webster, Bob Jason, Gail Kramer, Jon Douglas West, John Diaz, Steven Brandman, Nina M. Dluhy, Alex Coletti, Bruce Leddy, Allie Eberhardt, John Jackson, Michael Rubenstein

Stevie Ray Vaughan chronology
| Pride and Joy (1990) | Live at the El Mocambo (1991) |

Pride and Joy is a music video/live compilation by Stevie Ray Vaughan. It was the original video collection, spanning all of the music videos made from 1983-1989, plus a live track from MTV's Mardi Gras celebration in February 1987. Pride and Joy was also released in 2007 on DVD, expanded to include the video for "Little Wing", and three MTV Unplugged performances from January 30, 1990. The DVD also includes material for the Vaughan brothers' Family Style album and vintage television advertisements.

== Track listing ==
- "Love Struck Baby"
- "Cold Shot"
- "Couldn't Stand The Weather"
- "Change It"
- "Superstition"
- "I'm Leaving You (Commit A Crime)" (live)
- "The House Is Rockin'"
- "Crossfire"
- "Little Wing"
- "Rude Mood" (acoustic) [from MTV Unplugged]
- "Pride and Joy" (acoustic) [from MTV Unplugged]
- "Testify" (acoustic) [from MTV Unplugged]
- TV Commercial for Couldn't Stand the Weather
- TV Commercial for Soul to Soul
- "Tick Tock" [The Vaughan Brothers]
- "Good Texan" [The Vaughan Brothers]
- The Vaughan Brothers EPK
