= Stevie Ray Vaughan's musical instruments =

List of Stevie Ray Vaughan's instruments

This is a list and description of the guitars and other equipment played by musician Stevie Ray Vaughan. Vaughan played a number of Fender Stratocasters throughout his career, one of which, a 1963 body and a 1962 (with a rosewood slab fingerboard) neck, became "the most famous battered Strat in rock history". He was notoriously hard on his guitars, and many of them required extensive periodic maintenance, as well as other equipment. He used a limited number of (mainly vintage) effect pedals, and favored Fender and Marshall amplification.

In spite of being rough on his gear, it was reported Vaughan could hear even the slightest malfunction, even when, for instance, he was running 32 amplifiers into the mixing console for the recording of In Step. His guitars were serviced by Charley Wirz of Charley's Guitar Shop in Dallas, Texas, and especially Rene Martinez, who worked in Wirz's shop for a while. Martinez also built guitars for Carlos Santana. His amplifiers were tuned and serviced by Cesar Diaz, also the guitar technician for Eric Clapton and Bob Dylan.

== Number One ==
Number One (also known as Vaughan's 'First Wife') was a Fender Stratocaster used by Vaughan for most of his career; it was "rebuilt more times than a custom Chevy." Vaughan always claimed it was a 1959 model, since that date was written on the back of the pick-ups; Rene Martinez, who maintained the guitar since 1980, saw the year 1963 stamped in the body and 1962 on the neck. The guitar was given to him by Ray Hennig, owner of Ray & Shane Hennig's Heart of Texas Music store on South Lamar in Austin, Texas, in 1973 and was his main performing instrument and companion. Vaughan used the guitar on all five of his studio albums and on Family Style. The distinctive cigarette burn on the headstock comes from an incident when Vaughan had left a burning cigarette tucked under the sixth string for too long while playing.

The article "Supernova Strats" by Dan Erlewine in the February 1990 issue of Guitar Player magazine includes measurements of the specifications of several of Vaughan's guitars. All of Vaughan's guitars had a neck relief of approximately .012" at the 7th and 9th frets, and leveled out through the remainder of the fingerboard. The fingerboard radius of Number One when new would have been 7.25" like most Fender instruments made before the 1980s, but after refretting the fingerboard multiple times the radius evolved into a 9" or 10" radius in the upper registers. The guitar featured frets that measured 0.110" wide by 0.055" when new, similar to Dunlop 6100 fretwire. String height was measured to be 5/64" on the high E string and 7/64" on the low E string. Each string had three full winds for the best angle at the bone nut. It had a left-handed tremolo block, even though Vaughan was right-handed.

=== Neck ===
The original neck has a fairly thick D-shaped profile. It was not as sometimes stated a "D" width nut (D width was 1 7/8 inch – the standard width was B which is 1 5/8 – SRV's guitar had a standard B width of nominally 1 5/8). The nut width letter was stamped on the end of the neck on Fender guitars from March 1962. It had a curved rosewood fingerboard and was refretted so often that, after a while, it could not be refretted anymore. Martinez replaced it with the neck from "Red" (see below). This neck was destroyed when a piece of stage rigging fell on it. After Vaughan's death, the original neck was reinstalled on Number One, and both are now in the possession of Jimmie Vaughan.

=== Fender signature model ===
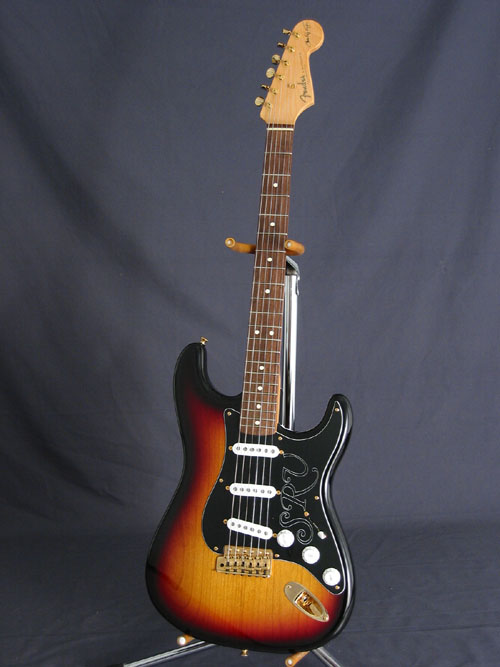
A Stevie Ray Vaughan signature Stratocaster, based on Number One

Vaughan collaborated with Fender for an Artist Signature model, based on Number One; already in the works at the time of Vaughan's death, his brother Jimmie asked for the process to be sped up and the guitar became available in 1992. To achieve the sound Vaughan wanted, builder Larry Brooks put 600 windings on the pickups. Besides adding to the number of windings, the polarity of the middle pickup was reversed to eliminate hum. The signature Strat has an alder body with a maple neck and pau ferro fingerboard, and comes equipped with .010-.046 strings (lighter than Vaughan's); it was praised by Guitar Player for its neck and "juicy tone": "the SRV is one of the coolest Strats we've ever played."

== Yellow ==
Yellow was a 1959 Stratocaster formerly owned by Vanilla Fudge's lead guitarist, Vince Martell, who sold it to Charley Wirz. The body had been hollowed out to make room for "a shitload of humbuckers," but Wirz fashioned a new pickguard in which he placed a single Fender Strat pickup in the neck position and painted the body yellow. Wirz gave the guitar to Vaughan in 1982; it is the guitar with the letters "SRV" on the pickguard under the strings.

== Red ==
In late 1983, Vaughan purchased a 1962 sunburst Fender Stratocaster from Charley's Guitar Shop, though he had it repainted by Fender in fiesta red as a custom color option, and simply named the guitar "Red." The guitar remained stock until 1986, when a left-handed neck was installed and "SRV" stickers were applied to the pickguard. In 1989, the neck on "Number One" was unable to withstand more re-fret jobs, replacing it with the original neck from "Red." The next year, following a concert at the Garden State Arts Center in Holmdel, New Jersey, a stanchion fell onto Vaughan's rack of guitars, splitting the neck from "Red" that was installed on "Number One." The neck was replaced the next night.

== Hamiltone Guitars ==
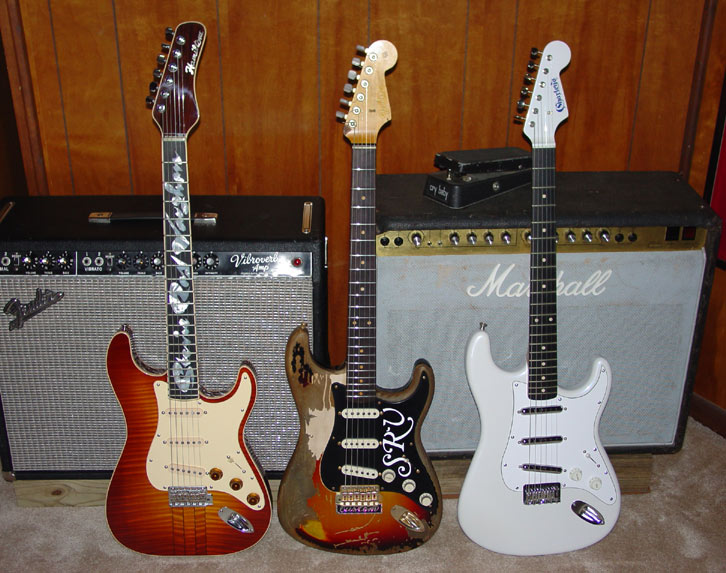
On the left: The 20th Anniversary Hamiltone made by Jim Hamilton

Hamiltone (also known as "Main" or the "Couldn't Stand the Weather" guitar) was a custom Stratocaster-style guitar made for Vaughan by James Hamilton in Buffalo, NY. It was presented to Vaughan by James as a gift from ZZ Top's Billy Gibbons on April 29, 1984.

This guitar features a 2-piece maple body and a 3-piece "neck-through body" design. It also originally had EMG preamped pickups, but Vaughan didn't like the pickups in it. He was about to make next the music video for "Couldn't Stand the Weather", and didn't want to get Number One wet during filming, as that would have ruined the 1959 pickups, so he used the Hamiltone for filming. The EMG pickups and Gibson style amber top hat knobs were changed in June 1984.

The Hamiltone's fingerboard is ebony with a mother-of-pearl inlay that read "Stevie Ray Vaughan". The guitar was originally set to be made for Stevie in 1979, but the plan was dropped when Vaughan started using his middle name "Ray"; he was only known as "Stevie Vaughan" at the time.

This guitar has been on display at a Guitar Center in Austin, TX since 2018 in celebration of his 64th birthday.

== Scotch ==
Scotch is a 1961 Fender Stratocaster used by Vaughan for the last five years of his life. He acquired this guitar in the fall of 1985, and it is said to have been bought in either Baltimore or "The Boathouse" in Norfolk, Virginia. It was to be a prize at one of Stevie's shows, but he bought the guitar instead and gave away another one of his guitars.

This guitar has a butterscotch colored finish with a non-original tiger-striped pickguard made by Rene Martinez, Vaughan's guitar tech. The tiger-striped pickguard resembled the same pickguard Buddy Guy had on his butter-colored guitar at the time.

Scotch was stock except for the tiger-striped pickguard where he added his famous "SRV" prismatic stickers.

== Charley ==
Charley was a white custom-made "hardtail" (non-tremolo, fixed bridge) "Stratocaster-style" guitar built by Charley Wirz, a friend of Vaughan's and owner of Charley's Guitar Shop in Dallas. Wirz built it in late 1983, and placed a neck plate on it engraved "To Stevie Ray Vaughan, more in '84". It had three Danelectro lipstick pickups. This guitar often was used during "Life Without You", which was itself said to be written as a tribute to Charley Wirz.

== Lenny ==
Lenny is a 1963 or 1964 Stratocaster, bought for Vaughan for his birthday by his wife, Lenora, and several friends because he didn't have the money to buy it. Originally 3-tone sunburst with a rosewood neck, it was later stripped down to a dark natural finish and re-fitted with a mid-'50s-style maple neck reportedly given to him by Billy Gibbons. Behind the bridge, on the lower bout of the guitar body is a unique inlay, thought to be originally from an early 1900s mandolin. The Fender Custom Shop has produced a limited-edition run of Lenny replicas since December 12, 2007, and they are sold by Guitar Center for $17,000. The guitar was mainly used for "Lenny". In 2004, Lenny was put up for auction and was sold to Guitar Center for $623,500. It is on display at Guitar Center's Austin location on Anderson Lane.

== Guild acoustic ==
He played a Guild JF6512 on MTV Unplugged, and on "Life By The Drop" from the posthumous album The Sky Is Crying.

== Other guitar equipment ==
=== Strings ===
Vaughan was noted for playing extraordinarily thick strings, "as thick as barbed wire," "sometimes as extreme as a .018 through .074 set." He was not picky on string brand, but favored GHS Nickel Rockers of heavy gauge, partly for tone and partly because his fretting and strumming were so strong he often snapped strings while playing. He changed around gauges often, depending on the condition of his fingers, but always favored, from high to low, .013, .015, .019, .028, .038, .058, though sometimes he used a slightly lighter high E string (.012 or .011). He always tuned down one half step.

=== Picks ===
Vaughan favored Fender Medium picks, and played with the round end of the pick, maintaining that the rounded end allowed for more string attack than the tip.

== Amplifiers ==
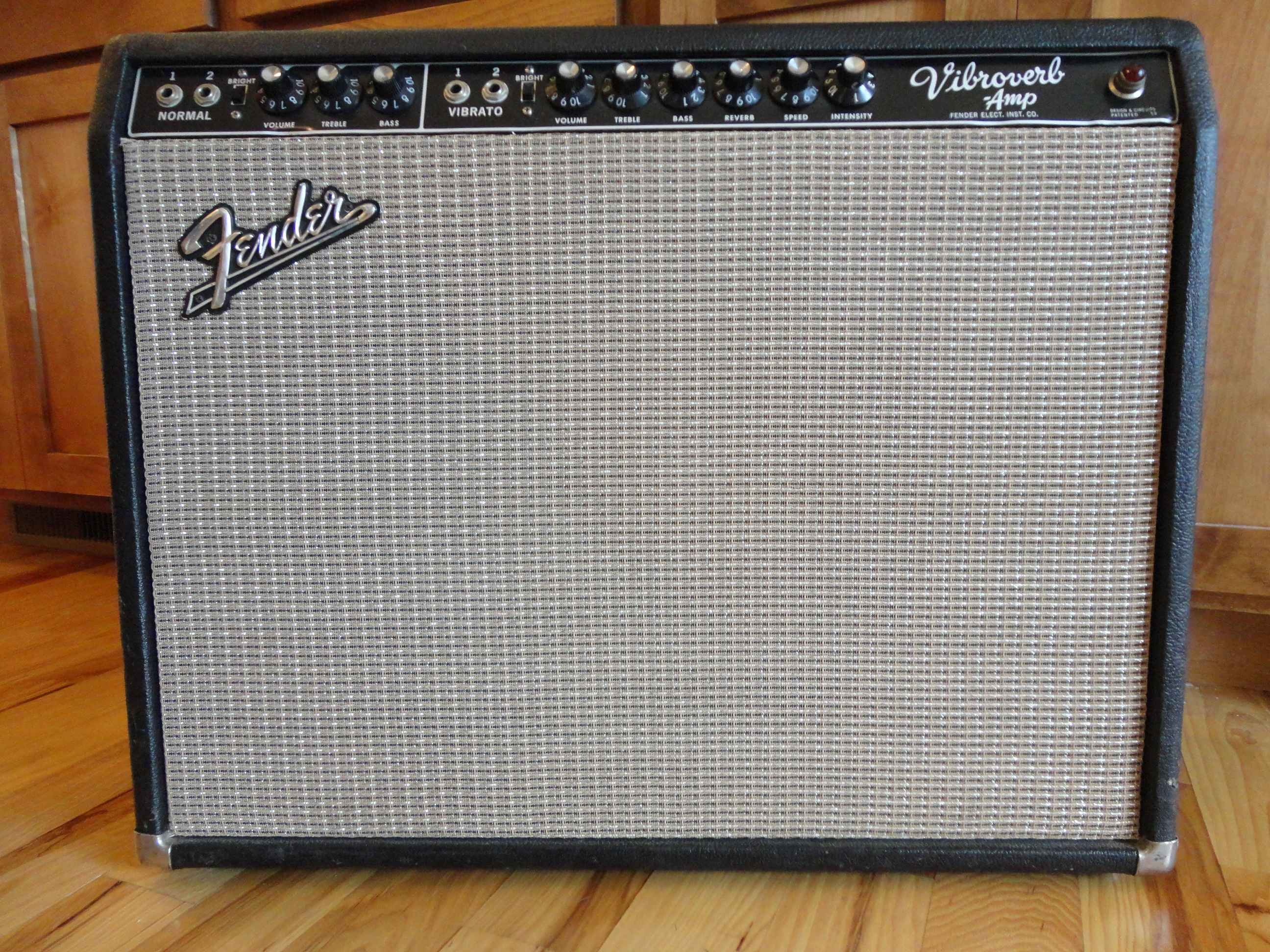
A 1964 Fender Vibroverb

Vaughan used various amplifiers, mainly Fender and Marshall. On his choice of amp use, he stated that he used the "Fenders for distortion and the Marshall for clarity", in contrast to most guitarists utilizing both amps the other way around. He often used two amplifiers simultaneously, one more distorted than the other.

The amplifiers he used on stage included:

- Two "Blackface" Fender Super Reverbs
- Marshall Club & Country combo amp with 2×12" JBL speakers
- Two 1964 "Blackface" Fender Vibroverb amplifiers (numbers five and six off production line), each with one 15" speaker

From early on his career, beginning in 1979, Vaughan received technical assistance from César Díaz, who began by replacing and tweaking the output transformers on his amplifiers. Vaughan played so hard (especially on the low strings) and his heavy strings produced such "non-standard frequencies" that the amplifiers' vacuum tubes would occasionally spark and emit smoke, causing the need to buffer the input.

An oddity about Vaughan's usage was that he preferred the amplifier's dials to always have the same numbers ("Volume at 7, treble at 5 1/2, bass at 4"), and "in order to avoid problems, [Díaz] would back off the volume control by unscrewing the knob and turning it back a bit so it would appear to be at the same level as before."

=== Studio equipment ===
On Texas Flood, Vaughan borrowed a Howard Dumble amplifier from Jackson Browne, and he later bought a 150-watt Dumble Steel String Singer. Besides Dumble, he also used Mesa Boogie amplifiers and a Groove Tubes pre-amp.

After he kicked his addictions, Vaughan became especially obsessed with the sound produced by his amplifiers. During the rehearsals for In Step in New York City, Díaz brought 32 amplifiers, as well as 200-watt Marshall 4×15" bass cabinets. According to Díaz, "the whole studio was taken up with amps—upstairs, downstairs, every room was filled with amps. So he would hit these notes, and the whole place would rattle."

== Effects ==
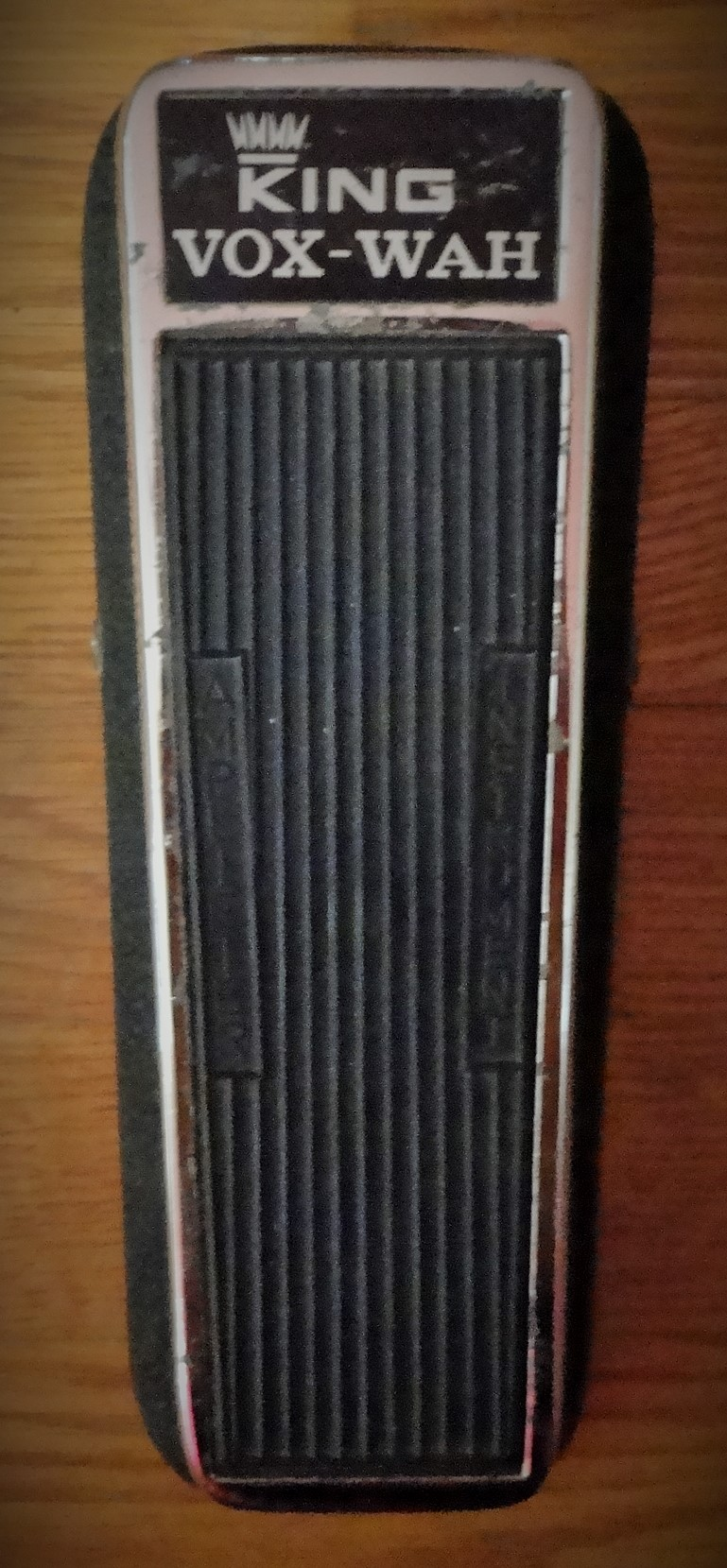
A 1968 King Vox Wah pedal

Vaughan typically used an Ibanez Tube Screamer (various kinds—the TS-808, TS9, and TS10), a Dimension D chorus rack unit, and a Leslie revolving speaker. Occasionally he used a Fender Vibratone (aka. Leslie 16/18. A Leslie speaker especially designed for guitar), and a Fuzz Face and Octavia. His standard wah pedal was a Vox, sometimes two simultaneously.

== See also ==
- List of guitars
