= Love Struck Baby =

Single by Stevie Ray Vaughan and Double Trouble

from the album Texas Flood
- B-side: "Rude Mood"
- Released: 1983
- Recorded: November 24, 1982
- Genre: Blues, rock
- Length: 2:19
- Label: Epic (US & UK)
- Songwriter: Stevie Ray Vaughan
- Producers: Stevie Ray Vaughan; Richard Mullen

Stevie Ray Vaughan and Double Trouble singles chronology
| "Love Struck Baby" (1983) | "Pride and Joy" (1983) |

"Love Struck Baby" is a blues rock song performed by Stevie Ray Vaughan and Double Trouble. Vaughan wrote the song about the night that he moved in with his then-wife, Lenny. The track was produced by Vaughan for the band's debut album Texas Flood, recorded in Los Angeles. "Love Struck Baby" was the first single from Texas Flood, released by Epic Records in the United States and United Kingdom. In the song's accompanying music video, bassist Tommy Shannon and drummer Chris Layton are shown relaxing at a bar before Vaughan enters and starts performing the song for a crowd. "Love Struck Baby" was a concert favorite for fans of the band; Vaughan would frequently play the guitar behind his head for part of the solo.

== Background, recording, and composition ==
Vaughan and Double Trouble had performed at the Montreux Jazz Festival in July 1982, which caught the attention of musician Jackson Browne. He offered the band free use of his personal recording studio in Downtown Los Angeles. During Thanksgiving weekend, they accepted Browne's offer and recorded a demo. It was heard by John H. Hammond, a talent scout who had discovered artists such as Aretha Franklin, Bob Dylan, and Bruce Springsteen among many others. He presented the demo to Greg Geller, head of A&R at Epic Records, and arranged a recording contract. As a result, the demo was mixed and Epic released Texas Flood in June 1983. "Love Struck Baby" was recorded on November 24, 1982. The song was engineered and co-produced by Richard Mullen. In early 1983, Vaughan's vocals were recorded at Riverside Sound in Austin, Texas.

"Love Struck Baby" is 2 minutes 19 seconds long and cited as a blues rock song on the sheet music published on Musicnotes.com by Alfred Music Publishing, composed in the key of A♭. It consists of a twelve-bar blues chord progression which is repeated for the first verse and guitar solos; the second, third, and fourth verses are played with a D♭–A♭–D♭–E♭ progression, while the choruses are played with a A♭–D♭–A♭–E♭ progression. The lyrics were written about the night that Vaughan and his then-wife, Lenny, moved in together. The song was performed in common time, with a moderately fast tempo of 170 beats per minute. A train-style drum beat played by Chris Layton carries through the track, over which Vaughan plays a driving rhythm guitar figure similar to Chuck Berry. He combines the influences of Berry and T-Bone Walker in the guitar solos.

== Music video ==
Stevie Ray Vaughan in the music video of "Love Struck Baby"

The music video for "Love Struck Baby" was filmed at the Rome Inn in Austin, Texas, and was directed by Dale Ward. In the video, a man is shown playing a game of pool in a bar, while other people are casually seated and relaxed. Shannon and Layton sit at the bar before Vaughan enters, giving them a head cue to follow him to the stage. The band starts playing the song, with various crowd members beginning to dance. The video ends with the audience applauding to the performance. The video is included on the Pride and Joy music video compilation DVD released in 2007.
