= Live Alive =

Live album by Stevie Ray Vaughan and Double Trouble
- Released: November 15, 1986
- Recorded: July 16, 1985 at Montreux Jazz Festival; July 17–18, 1986 at Austin Opera House; July 19, 1986 at Dallas Starfest
- Genre: Blues rock
- Length: 70:26
- Label: Epic
- Producers: Stevie Ray Vaughan, Double Trouble

Stevie Ray Vaughan and Double Trouble chronology
Soul to Soul (1985)	Live Alive (1986)	In Step (1989)

Live Alive is the first live album compiled from four live performances by Stevie Ray Vaughan and Double Trouble. The performances were recorded on July 15, 1985 at the Montreux Jazz Festival; July 17–18, 1986 at the Austin Opera House; and July 19, 1986 at Dallas Starfest. Much of the album was overdubbed in the studio. CD releases of the album omit the final song "Life Without You", without mentioning the omission and despite packaging stating "2-Record Set On 1 Compact Disc".

== Background ==
In addition to songs from his previous three studio albums, the album includes cover songs that were recorded for the first time on this release, "Superstition," "I'm Leaving You", and "Willy the Wimp". The track "Life Without You", which was included on the original LP, was omitted from the CD releases at the time, but it made its CD debut in 2009 on the Japanese paper-sleeve edition (EICP 1088-9).

== Reception ==
Professional ratings
Review scores
Source	Rating
AllMusic	3/5 stars
The Penguin Guide to Blues Recordings	3/4 stars

The album reached number 52 on the Billboard 200 in the United States and was certified Platinum by the RIAA in December 1994. Steve Huey of AllMusic gave it 3 out of 5 stars, commenting that "it's not as polished as the studio recordings, Vaughan's guitar tone is raw, and the performances feel spontaneous and passionate."

== Track listing ==
All tracks are written by Stevie Ray Vaughan, except where noted.

Side 1
No.	Title	Writer(s)	Length
1.	"Say What!"		4:43
2.	"Ain't Gone 'n' Give Up on Love"		6:26
3.	"Pride and Joy"		4:59
4.	"Mary Had a Little Lamb"	Buddy Guy	4:20

Side 2
No.	Title	Writer(s)	Length
1.	"Superstition"	Stevie Wonder	4:33
2.	"I'm Leaving You (Commit a Crime)"	Chester Burnett	5:40
3.	"Cold Shot"	Michael Kindred arr. Vaughan	5:36
4.	"Willie the Wimp"	Ruth Ellsworth, Bill Carter	4:51

Side 3
No.	Title	Writer(s)	Length
1.	"Look at Little Sister"	Hank Ballard	4:06
2.	"Texas Flood"	Larry C. Davis, Joseph Wade Scott	6:36
3.	"Voodoo Child (Slight Return)"	Jimi Hendrix	9:42

Side 4
No.	Title	Writer(s)	Length
1.	"Love Struck Baby"		3:41
2.	"Change It"	Doyle Bramhall	4:53
3.	"Life Without You"		9:30

== Personnel ==
- Stevie Ray Vaughan – guitar and vocals
- Tommy Shannon – bass
- Chris "Whipper" Layton – drums
- Reese Wynans – keyboards

Guest musician

- Jimmie Vaughan - guitar and six-string bass on "Willie the Wimp", "Love Struck Baby", "Look at Little Sister", and "Change It"

== Charts ==
Chart (1986–1987)	Peak position
Australian Albums (Kent Music Report)	49
Canada Top Albums/CDs (RPM)	34
Dutch Albums (Album Top 100)	48
Finnish Albums (The Official Finnish Charts)	26
New Zealand Albums (RMNZ)	20
US Billboard 200	52

== Certifications ==
Region	Certification	Certified units/sales
Canada (Music Canada)	Platinum	100,000^{^}
United States (RIAA)	Platinum	1,000,000^{^}
^{^} Shipments figures based on certification alone.
