= Stevie Ray Vaughan =

American blues guitarist (1954–1990)

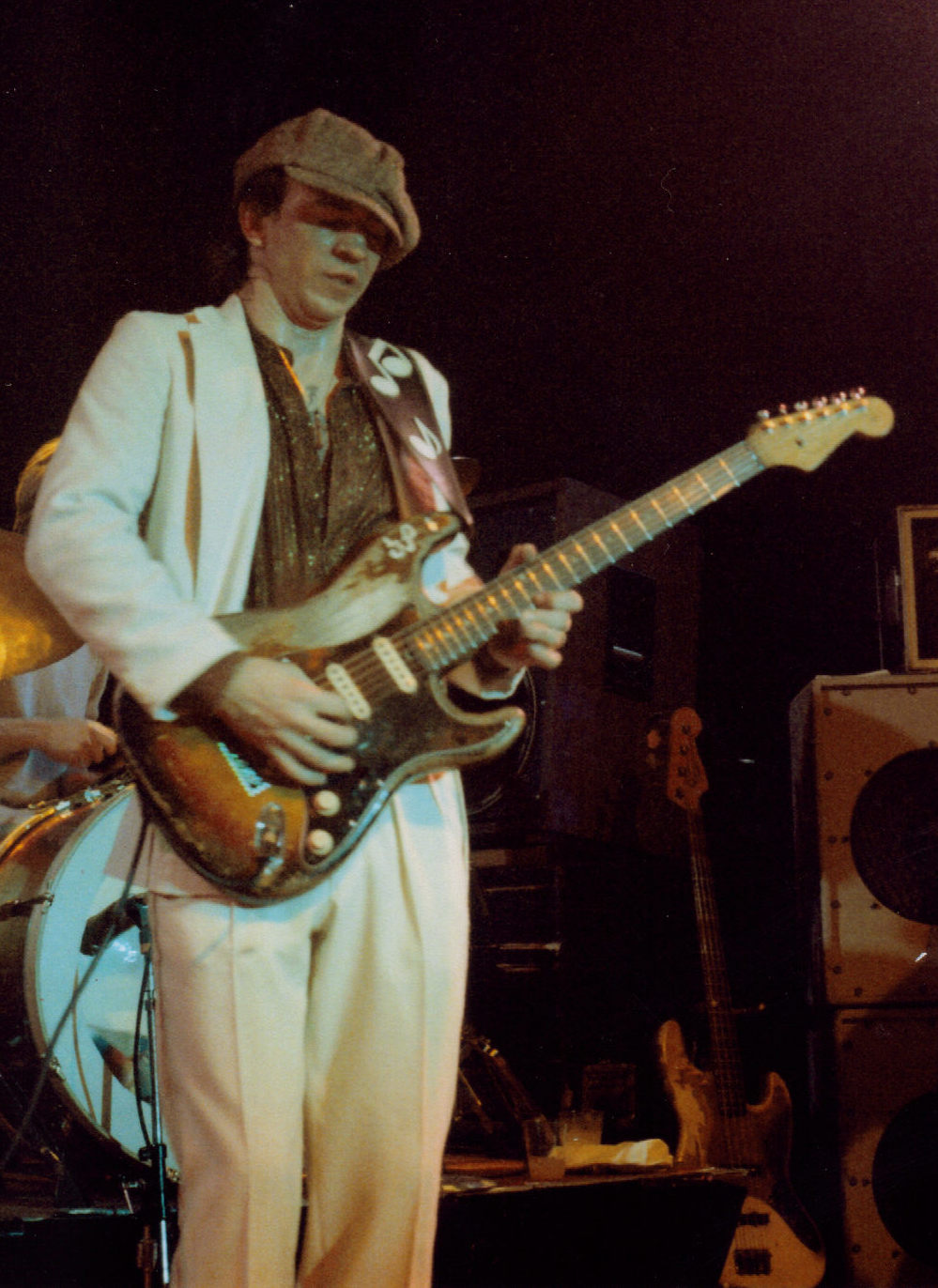
- Vaughan performing at the Ritz Theater in Austin, Texas, March 1983
- Born: Stephen Ray Vaughan; October 3, 1954; Dallas, Texas, U.S.
- Died: August 27, 1990 (aged 35); East Troy, Wisconsin, U.S.
- Cause of death: Helicopter crash
- Other names: Stevie Vaughan, SRV
- Occupations: Musician; songwriter
- Spouse: Lenora Bailey (m. 1979; div. 1988)
- Partners: Lindi Bethel (1973–1979); Janna Lapidus (1986–1990)
- Relatives: Jimmie Vaughan (brother)
- Awards: List of awards and nominations
- Musical career
- Genres: Texas blues; blues rock; electric blues; rock and roll; fusion jazz
- Instruments: Guitar; vocals
- Works: Discography
- Years active: 1965–1990
- Labels: Epic; Legacy; Sony
- Formerly of: Double Trouble; The Vaughan Brothers
- Website: srvofficial.com

Stephen Ray Vaughan (October 3, 1954 – August 27, 1990), also known abbreviated as SRV, was an American musician, best known as the guitarist and frontman of the blues rock trio Stevie Ray Vaughan and Double Trouble. Although his mainstream career spanned only seven years, he is considered one of the most influential musicians in the history of blues music, and one of the greatest guitarists of all time. He was the younger brother of guitarist Jimmie Vaughan, a pioneer in his own right of the late '70's into '80's Texas-blues revival, and Stevie's earliest mentor and lifelong inspiration.

Born and raised in Dallas, Vaughan began playing guitar at age seven, motivated initially by his brother Jimmie, who was three years his senior. In 1972, he dropped out of high school and moved to Austin, where he began to gain a following after playing gigs on the local club circuit. Vaughan joined forces with Tommy Shannon on bass and Chris Layton on drums as Double Trouble in 1978. The band established itself in the Austin music scene and soon became one of the most popular acts in Texas. They performed at the Montreux Jazz Festival in July 1982, where David Bowie saw Vaughan play. Bowie contacted him for a studio gig in December where he played blues guitar on the album Let's Dance (1983). John Hammond heard a demo album that Vaughan and Double Trouble had recorded and interested major label Epic Records in signing them to a record deal in March 1983. Within months, they achieved mainstream success for the critically acclaimed debut album Texas Flood. With a series of successful network television appearances and extensive concert tours, Vaughan became the leading figure in the blues revival of the 1980s.

Vaughan struggled with alcoholism and drug addiction for most of his life. He also struggled with the personal and professional pressures of fame and his marriage to Lenora "Lenny" Bailey. He successfully completed rehabilitation and began touring again with Double Trouble in November 1986. His fourth and final studio album In Step reached number 33 in the United States in 1989; it was one of Vaughan's most critically and commercially successful releases and included his only number-one hit, "Crossfire". He became one of the world's most popular blues performers, and he headlined Madison Square Garden in 1989 and the Beale Street Music Festival in 1990.

On August 27, 1990, Vaughan and four others were killed in a helicopter crash in East Troy, Wisconsin, after performing with Double Trouble at Alpine Valley Music Theatre. An investigation concluded that the cause of the accident was pilot error.

Vaughan's music continued to achieve commercial success with several posthumous releases and has sold over 15 million albums in the United States alone. Rolling Stone has twice ranked him among the top twenty guitar players of all time. Vaughan was posthumously inducted into the Rock and Roll Hall of Fame in 2015, along with Double Trouble bandmates Chris Layton, Tommy Shannon, and Reese Wynans.

== Family and early life ==
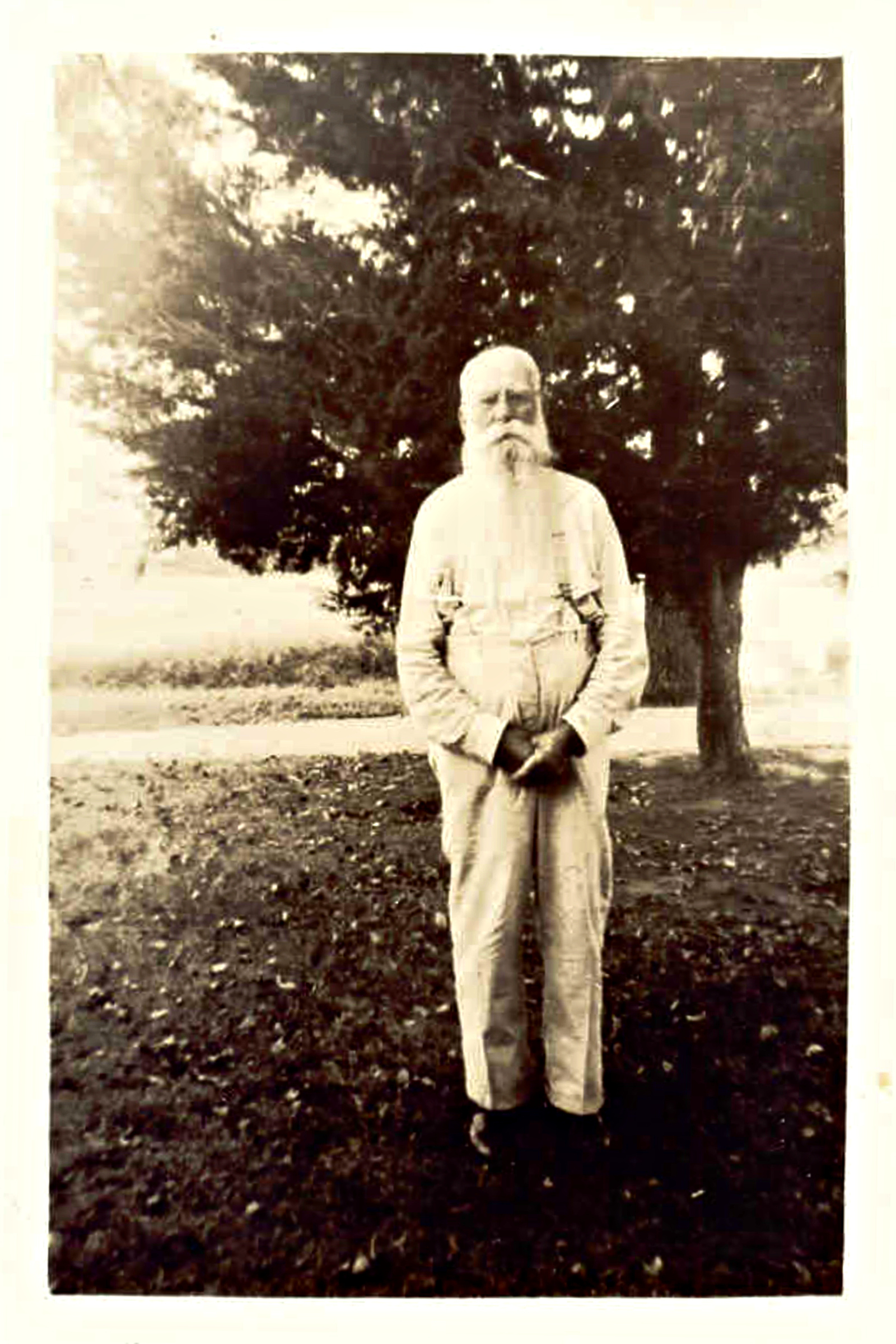
Vaughan's grandfather, Thomas Lee Vaughan, married Laura Belle LaRue and moved to Rockwall County, Texas, where they lived by sharecropping. (Note: Vaughan's great-grandfather, Robert Hodgen LaRue, c. 1900s Vaughan's ancestry has been traced back to his great-grandfather, Robert Hodgen LaRue. Vaughan's paternal grandmother, Laura Belle LaRue, was a sharecropper who moved to Rockwall County from Terrell, Texas, after marrying her husband, Thomas Lee Vaughan, on July 13, 1902. She gave birth to nine children, eight of whom survived infancy. On Sundays, Laura would gather her children around her piano in the living room, singing hymns and popular standards. In 1928, Thomas died from Bright's disease and left Laura's family to pick cotton for a living at the beginning of the Great Depression.)

Stevie's father, Jimmie Lee Vaughan, was born on September 6, 1921. Jimmie Vaughan, also known as Jim or Big Jim, dropped out of school at age sixteen and enlisted in the U.S. Navy during World War II. After his discharge from the military, he married Martha Jean (née Cook; 1928–2009) on January 13, 1950. They had a son, Jimmie, in 1951. Stevie was born at Methodist Hospital on October 3, 1954, in Dallas. Big Jim secured a job as an asbestos worker. The family moved frequently and lived in other states such as Arkansas, Louisiana, Mississippi, and Oklahoma before ultimately moving to the Oak Cliff section of Dallas. A shy and insecure boy, Vaughan was deeply affected by his childhood experiences. His father struggled with alcohol abuse and often terrorized his family and friends with his bad temper. In later years, Vaughan recalled that he had been a victim of his father's violence. His father died on August 27, 1986, exactly four years before Vaughan himself.

=== First instruments ===
In the early 1960s, Vaughan's admiration for his brother Jimmie resulted in his trying different instruments such as the drums and saxophone. (Note: According to Vaughan, his first instrument was a drum set fashioned out of shoe boxes and pie pans, using clothes hangers as drum sticks. He also attempted playing saxophone, though Vaughan recalled: "... all I could get were a few squeaks".) In 1961, for his seventh birthday, Vaughan received his first guitar, a toy guitar from Sears with a Western motif. (Note: This guitar was known as the "Wyatt Earp" model designed by Jefferson Manufacturing, a Philadelphia-based company. Available from 1959 to 1968, it was made out of fiberboard with a black to cream sunburst finish and red screen-printed Western designs.) Learning by ear he diligently committed himself, following along to songs by the Nightcaps, particularly "Wine, Wine, Wine" and "Thunderbird". (Note: In the late 1950s, the Nightcaps were widely recognized as one of the first white blues groups from Dallas. Though they never gained national attention, the band became a fixture of the city's music scene.) He listened to blues artists such as Albert King, Otis Rush, and Muddy Waters, and rock guitarists including Jimi Hendrix and Lonnie Mack, as well as jazz guitarists including Kenny Burrell. In 1963, he acquired his first electric guitar, a Gibson ES-125T, as a hand-me-down from Jimmie.

Soon after he acquired the electric guitar, Vaughan joined his first band, the Chantones, in 1965. Their first show was at a talent contest held in Dallas' Hill Theatre, but after realizing that they could not perform a Jimmy Reed song in its entirety, Vaughan left the band and joined the Brooklyn Underground, playing professionally at local bars and clubs. He received Jimmie's Fender Broadcaster, which he later traded for an Epiphone Riviera. When Jimmie left home at age sixteen, Vaughan's apparent obsession with the guitar caused a lack of support from his parents. Miserable at home, he took a job at a local hamburger stand, where he washed dishes and dumped trash for seventy cents an hour. After falling into a barrel of grease, he grew tired of the job and quit to devote his life to a music career.

== Music career ==
=== Early years ===
In May 1969, after leaving the Brooklyn Underground, Vaughan joined a band called the Southern Distributor. He had learned the Yardbirds' "Jeff's Boogie" and played the song at the band audition. Mike Steinbach, the group's drummer, commented: "The kid was fourteen. We auditioned him on 'Jeff's Boogie,' really fast instrumental guitar, and he played it note for note." Although they played pop rock covers, Vaughan conveyed his interest in the addition of blues songs to the group's repertoire; he was told that he would not earn a living playing blues music and he and the band parted ways. Later that year, bassist Tommy Shannon walked into a Dallas club and heard Vaughan playing guitar. Fascinated by the skillful playing, which he described as "incredible even then", Shannon borrowed a bass guitar and the two jammed. (Note: In 1969, Shannon, who had parted ways with musician Johnny Winter after performing at Woodstock, moved back to Dallas and first met Vaughan at a club called the Fog, which was coincidentally the same place where he had met Winter.) Within a few years, they began performing together in a band called Krackerjack.

In February 1970, Vaughan joined a band called Liberation, which was a nine-piece group with a horn section. Having spent the past month briefly playing bass with Jimmie in Texas Storm, he had originally auditioned as bassist. Impressed by Vaughan's guitar playing, Scott Phares, the group's original guitarist, modestly became the bassist. In mid-1970, they performed at the Adolphus Hotel in downtown Dallas, where ZZ Top asked them to perform. During Liberation's break, Vaughan jammed with ZZ Top on the Nightcaps song "Thunderbird". Phares later described the performance: "they tore the house down. It was awesome. It was one of those magical evenings. Stevie fit in like a glove on a hand."

Attending Justin F. Kimball High School during the early 1970s, Vaughan's late-night shows contributed to his neglect of his studies, including music theory; he would often sleep during class. His pursuit of a musical career was disapproved of by many of the school's administrators but he was also encouraged by many people, including his art teacher, to strive for a career in art. (Note: Some of Vaughan's cartoons were published in his high school's newspaper.) In his second year, he attended an evening class for experimental art at Southern Methodist University, but left when it conflicted with rehearsal. Vaughan later spoke of his dislike of the school and recalled having received daily notes from the principal about his grooming.

=== First recordings ===
In September 1970, Vaughan made his first studio recordings with the band Cast of Thousands, which included future actor Stephen Tobolowsky. They recorded two songs, "Red, White and Blue" and "I Heard a Voice Last Night", for a compilation album, A New Hi, that featured various teenage bands from Dallas. In late January 1971, feeling confined by playing pop hits with Liberation, Vaughan formed his own band, Blackbird. After growing tired of the Dallas music scene, he dropped out of school and moved with the band to Austin, Texas, which had more tolerant audiences. There, Vaughan initially took residence at the Rolling Hills Club, a local blues venue that would later become the Soap Creek Saloon. Blackbird played at several clubs in Austin and opened shows for bands such as Sugarloaf, Wishbone Ash, and Zephyr, but could not maintain a consistent lineup. In early December 1972, Vaughan left Blackbird and joined Krackerjack; he performed with them for less than three months.

In March 1973, Vaughan joined Marc Benno's band, the Nightcrawlers, having met Benno at a jam session years before. The band featured vocalist Doyle Bramhall, who met Vaughan when he was twelve years old. The next month, the Nightcrawlers recorded an album at Sunset Sound Recorders in Hollywood for A&M Records. While the album was rejected by A&M, it included Vaughan's first songwriting efforts, "Dirty Pool" and "Crawlin'". Soon afterward, he and the Nightcrawlers traveled back to Austin without Benno. In mid-1973, they signed a contract with Bill Ham, manager for ZZ Top, and played various gigs across the Southern United States, although many of them were unsuccessful. Ham left the band stranded in Mississippi without any way to make it back home and demanded reimbursement from Vaughan for equipment expenses; Ham was never reimbursed. (Note: According to authors Joe Nick Patoski and Bill Crawford, Bill Ham had invested $11,000 for a U-Haul truck and backline equipment.)

In 1975, Vaughan joined a six-piece band called Paul Ray and the Cobras which included guitarist Denny Freeman and saxophonist Joe Sublett. For the next two-and-a-half years, he earned a living performing weekly at a popular venue in town, the Soap Creek Saloon, and ultimately the newly opened Antone's, widely known as Austin's "home of the blues". (Note: Founded and opened by Clifford Antone on July 15, 1975, Antone's was managed by singer Angela Strehli and hired The Fabulous Thunderbirds as the unofficial house band.) In late 1976, Vaughan recorded a single with them, "Other Days" as the A-side and "Texas Clover" as the B-side. With Vaughan playing guitar on both tracks, the single was released on February 7, 1977. In March, readers of the Austin Sun voted them as Band of the Year. In addition to playing with the Cobras, Vaughan jammed with many of his influences at Antone's, including Buddy Guy, Hubert Sumlin, Jimmy Rogers, Lightnin' Hopkins, and Albert King.

Vaughan toured with the Cobras during much of 1977, but near the end of September, when they decided to strive for a mainstream musical direction, he left the band and formed Triple Threat Revue, which included singer Lou Ann Barton, bassist W. C. Clark, and drummer Fredde "Pharaoh" Walden. In January 1978, they recorded four songs in Austin, including Vaughan's composition "I'm Cryin'". The thirty-minute audio recording marks the only known studio recording of the band.

=== Double Trouble ===
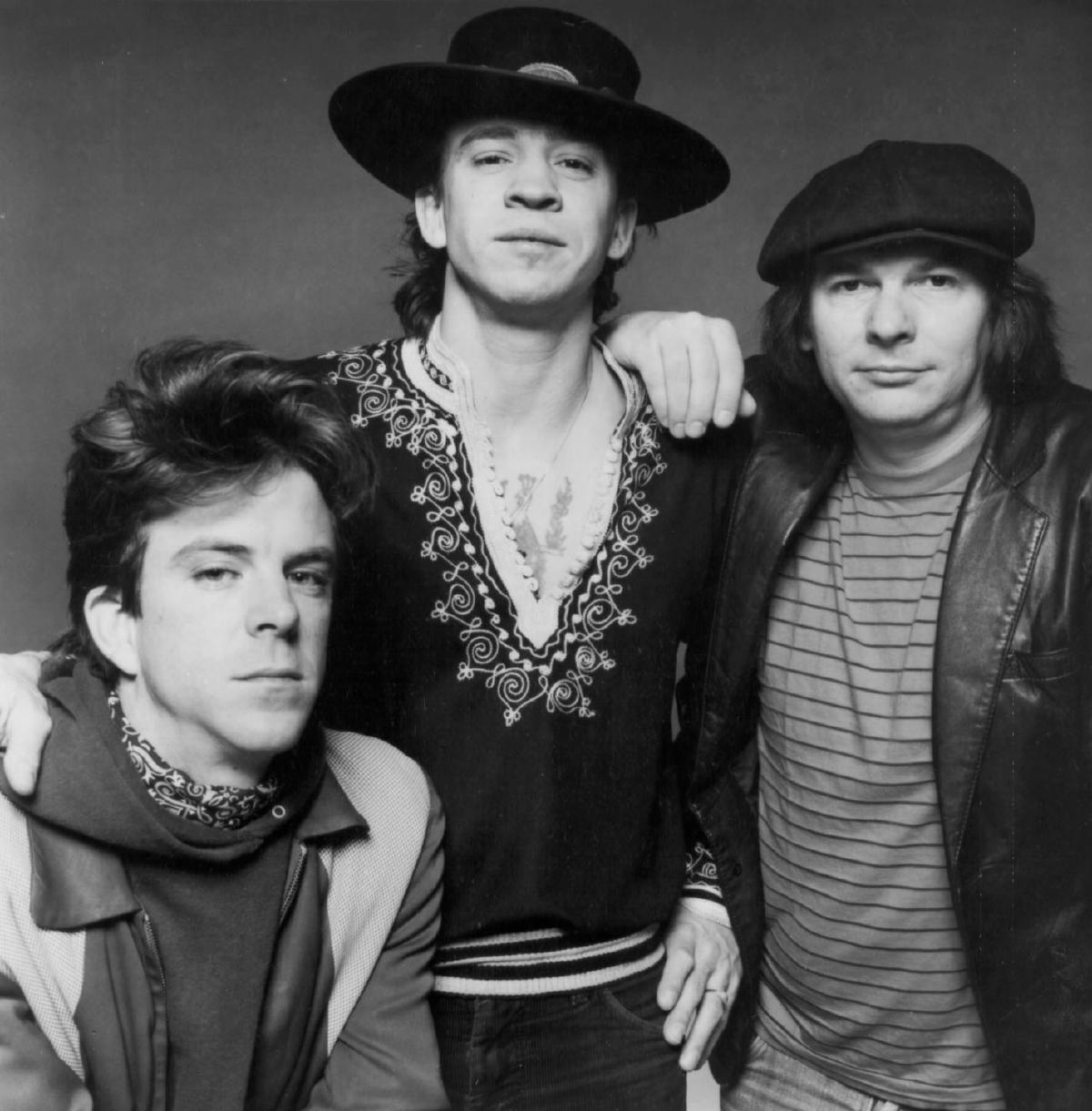
Double Trouble in 1983. From left to right: Chris Layton, Vaughan and Tommy Shannon.

In mid-May 1978, Clark left to form his own group and Vaughan renamed the band Double Trouble, taken from the title of an Otis Rush song. Following the recruitment of bassist Jackie Newhouse, Walden quit in July, and was briefly replaced by Jack Moore, who had moved to Texas from Boston; he performed with the band for about two months. Vaughan then began looking for a drummer and soon after, he met Chris Layton through Sublett, who was his roommate. Layton, who had recently parted ways with Greezy Wheels, was taught by Vaughan to play a shuffle rhythm. When Vaughan offered Layton the position, he agreed. In early July, Vaughan befriended Lenora Bailey, known as "Lenny", who became his girlfriend, and ultimately his wife. The marriage was to last for six and a half years. (Note: Vaughan and Lenny married on December 23, 1979, at the Rome Inn, after he had a dream that Lenny was sitting on Howlin' Wolf's knee.)

In early October 1978, Vaughan and Double Trouble earned a frequent residency performing at one of Austin's most popular nightspots, the Rome Inn. During a performance, Edi Johnson, an accountant at Manor Downs, noticed Vaughan. She remembered: "I'm not an authority on music—it's whatever turned me on—but this did." She recommended him to Manor Downs owner Frances Carr and general manager Chesley Millikin, who was interested in managing artists and saw Vaughan's musical potential. After Barton quit Double Trouble in mid-November 1979, Millikin signed Vaughan to a management contract. Vaughan also hired Robert "Cutter" Brandenburg as road manager, whom he had met in 1969. Addressing him as "Stevie Ray", Brandenburg convinced Vaughan to use his middle name on stage. In October 1980, bassist Tommy Shannon attended a Double Trouble performance at Rockefeller's in Houston. Shannon, who was playing with Alan Haynes at the time, participated in a jam session with Vaughan and Layton halfway through their set. Shannon later commented: "I went down there that night, and I'll never forget this: it was like, when I walked in the door and I heard them playing, it was like a revelation. 'That's where I want to be; that's where I belong, right there.' During the break, I went up to Stevie and told him that. I didn't try to sneak around and hide it from the bass player [Jackie Newhouse]—I didn't know if he was listening or not. I just really wanted to be in that band. I sat in that night and it sounded great." Almost three months later, when Vaughan offered Shannon the position, he readily accepted.

==== Drug charge and trial ====
On December 5, 1979, while Vaughan was in a dressing room before a performance in Houston, an off-duty police officer arrested him after witnessing him using cocaine near an open window. He was formally charged with cocaine possession and subsequently released on $1,000 bail. Double Trouble was the opening act for Muddy Waters, who said about Vaughan's drug abuse: "Stevie could perhaps be the greatest guitar player that ever lived, but he won't live to get 40 years old if he doesn't leave that white powder alone." The following year, he was required to return on January 16 and February 29 for court appearances.

During the final court date on April 17, 1980, Vaughan was sentenced with two years' probation and was prohibited from leaving Texas. Along with a stipulation of entering treatment for drug abuse, he was required to "avoid persons or places of known disreputable or harmful character"; he refused to comply with both of these orders. After a lawyer was hired, his probation officer had the sentence revised to allow him to work outside the state. The incident later caused him to refuse maid service while staying in hotels during concert tours.

==== Montreux Jazz Festival ====
Although popular in Texas at the time, Double Trouble failed to gain national attention. The group's visibility improved when record producer Jerry Wexler recommended them to Claude Nobs, organizer of the Montreux Jazz Festival. He insisted the festival's blues night would be great with Vaughan, whom he called "a jewel, one of those rarities who comes along once in a lifetime", and Nobs agreed to book Double Trouble on July 17, 1982.

Vaughan opened with a medley arrangement of Freddie King's song "Hide Away" and his own extremely fast instrumental composition, "Rude Mood". Double Trouble went on to perform renditions of Larry Davis' "Texas Flood", Hound Dog Taylor's "Give Me Back My Wig", and Albert Collins' "Collins Shuffle", as well as three original compositions: "Pride and Joy", "Love Struck Baby", and "Dirty Pool". The set ended with boos from the audience. People's James McBride wrote:

He seemed to come out of nowhere, a Zorro-type figure in a riverboat gambler's hat, roaring into the '82 Montreux festival with a '59 Stratocaster at his hip and two flame-throwing sidekicks he called Double Trouble. He had no album, no record contract, no name, but he reduced the stage to a pile of smoking cinders and, afterward, everyone wanted to know who he was." (Note: According to authors Joe Nick Patoski and Bill Crawford, "like the audiences' adverse reaction to Muddy Waters' debut in England in 1958 as recorded by blues scholar Paul Oliver, Stevie's full-volume electric blues experience was 'meat that proved too strong for many stomachs.' The Europeans, accustomed to a quieter, folk blues style, cringed at the sheer volume level emitted by the Texas trio." Biographer Craig Hopkins wrote: "the two nights in Montreux became the single most important gigs in Stevie's career.")

According to road manager Don Opperman: "the way I remember it, the 'ooos' and the 'boos' were mixed together, but Stevie was pretty disappointed. Stevie [had] just handed me his guitar and walked off stage, and I'm like, 'are you coming back?' There was a doorway back there; the audience couldn't see the guys, but I could. He went back to the dressing room with his head in his hands. I went back there finally, and that was the end of the show." According to Vaughan: "it wasn't the whole crowd [that booed]. It was just a few people sitting right up front. The room there was built for acoustic jazz. When five or six people boo, wow, it sounds like the whole world hates you. They thought we were too loud, but shoot, I had four army blankets folded over my amp, and the volume level was on 2. I'm used to playin' on 10!" The performance was filmed and later released on DVD in September 2004.

On the following night, Double Trouble was booked in the lounge of the Montreux Casino, with Jackson Browne in attendance. Browne jammed with Double Trouble until the early morning hours and offered them free use of his personal recording studio in downtown Los Angeles. In late November the band accepted his offer and recorded ten songs in two days. While they were in the studio, Vaughan received a telephone call from David Bowie, who had met him after the Montreux performance, and he invited him to participate in a recording session for his next studio album, Let's Dance. In January 1983, Vaughan recorded guitar on six of the album's eight songs, including the title track and "China Girl". The album was released on April 14, 1983, and sold over three times as many copies as Bowie's previous album.

==== National success ====
In mid-March 1983, Gregg Geller, vice president of A&R at Epic Records, signed Double Trouble to the label at the recommendation of record producer John Hammond. Soon afterward, Epic financed a music video for "Love Struck Baby", which was filmed at the Cherry Tavern in New York City. Vaughan recalled: "we changed the name of the place in the video. Four years ago I got married in a club where we used to play all the time called the Rome Inn. When they closed it down, the owner gave me the sign, so in the video we put that up behind me on the stage."

With the success of Let's Dance, Bowie requested Vaughan as the featured instrumentalist for the upcoming Serious Moonlight Tour, realizing that he was an essential aspect of the album's groundbreaking success. In late April, Vaughan began rehearsals for the tour in Las Colinas, Texas. When contract renegotiations for his performance fee failed, Vaughan abandoned the tour days before its opening date, and he was replaced by Earl Slick. Vaughan commented: "I couldn't gear everything on something I didn't really care a whole lot about. It was kind of risky, but I really didn't need all the headaches." Although contributing factors were widely disputed, Vaughan soon gained major publicity for quitting the tour.

On May 9, the band performed at The Bottom Line in New York City, where they opened for Bryan Adams, with Hammond, Mick Jagger, John McEnroe, Rick Nielsen, Billy Gibbons, and Johnny Winter in attendance. Brandenburg described the performance as "ungodly": "I think Stevie played every lick as loud and as hard and with as much intensity as I've ever heard him." The performance earned Vaughan a positive review published in the New York Post, asserting that Double Trouble outperformed Adams. "Fortunately, Bryan Adams, the Canadian rocker who is opening arena dates for Journey, doesn't headline too often", wrote Martin Porter, who claimed that after the band's performance, the stage had been "rendered to cinders by the most explosively original showmanship to grace the New York stage in some time."

==== Texas Flood ====
After acquiring the recordings from Browne's studio, Double Trouble began assembling the material for a full-length LP. The album, Texas Flood, opens with the track "Love Struck Baby", which was written for Lenny on their "love-struck day". He composed "Pride and Joy" and "I'm Cryin'" for one of his former girlfriends, Lindi Bethel. Although both are musically similar, their lyrics are two different perspectives of the relationship. Along with covers of Howlin' Wolf, the Isley Brothers, and Buddy Guy, the album included Vaughan's cover of Larry Davis' "Texas Flood", a song that he became strongly associated with. "Lenny" served as a tribute to his wife, which he composed at the end of their bed.

Texas Flood featured cover art by illustrator Brad Holland, who is known for his artwork for Playboy and The New York Times. Originally envisioned with Vaughan sitting on a horse depicting a promotable resemblance, Holland painted an image of him leaning against a wall with a guitar, using a photograph as a reference. Released on June 13, 1983, Texas Flood peaked at number 38 and ultimately sold half a million copies. While Rolling Stone editor Kurt Loder asserted that Vaughan did not possess a distinctive voice, according to AllMusic senior editor Stephen Thomas Erlewine, the release was a "monumental impact". Billboard described it as "a guitar boogie lovers delight". Agent Alex Hodges commented: "No one knew how big that record would be, because guitar players weren't necessarily in vogue, except for some that were so established they were undeniable ... he was one of the few artists that was recouped on every record in a short period of time."

On June 16, Vaughan gave a performance at Tango nightclub in Dallas, which celebrated the album's release. Assorted VIPs attended the performance, including Ted Nugent, Sammy Hagar, and members of The Kinks and Uriah Heep. Jack Chase, vice president of marketing for Epic, recalled: "the coming-out party at Tango was very important; it was absolutely huge. All the radio station personalities, DJs, program directors, all the retail record store owners and the important managers, press, all the executives from New York came down—about seven hundred people. We attacked in Dallas first with Q102-FM and [DJ] Redbeard. We had the Tango party—it was hot. It was the ticket." The Dallas Morning News reviewed the performance, starting with the rhetorical question; "what if Stevie Ray Vaughan had an album release party and everybody came? It happened Thursday night at Tango. ... The adrenaline must have been gushing through the musicians' veins as they performed with rare finesse and skill."

Following a brief tour in Europe, Hodges arranged an engagement for Double Trouble as The Moody Blues' opening act during a two-month tour of North America. (Note: Double Trouble received $5,000 in compensation for each show, as well as a $1,000–$2,000 bonus for successful ticket sales.) Hodges stated that many people disliked the idea of Double Trouble opening for The Moody Blues, but asserted that a common thread that both bands shared was "album-oriented rock". Tommy Shannon described the tour as "glorious": "Our record hadn't become that successful yet, but we were playing in front of coliseums full of people. We just went out and played, and it fit like a glove. The sound rang through those big coliseums like a monster. People were going crazy, and they had no idea who we were!" After appearing on the television series Austin City Limits, the band played a sold-out concert at New York City's Beacon Theatre. Variety wrote that their ninety-minute set at the Beacon "left no doubt that this young Texas musician is indeed the 'guitar hero of the present era.'"

==== Couldn't Stand the Weather ====
In January 1984, Double Trouble began recording their second studio album, Couldn't Stand the Weather, at the Power Station, with John Hammond as executive producer and engineer Richard Mullen. Layton later recalled working with Hammond: "he was kind of like a nice hand on your shoulder, as opposed to someone that jumped in and said, 'let's redo this, let's do that more.' He didn't get involved in that way at all. He was a feedback person." As the sessions began, Vaughan's cover of Bob Geddins' "Tin Pan Alley" was recorded while audio levels were being checked. Layton remembers the performance: "... we did probably the quietest version we ever did up 'til that point. We ended it and [Hammond] said; 'that's the best that song will ever sound,' and we went; 'we haven't even got sounds, have we?' He goes, 'that doesn't matter. That's the best you'll ever do that song.' We tried it again five, six, seven times – I can't even remember. But it never quite sounded like it did that first time."

During recording sessions, Vaughan began experimenting with other combinations of musicians, including Fran Christina and Stan Harrison, who played drums and saxophone respectively on the jazz instrumental, "Stang's Swang". Jimmie Vaughan played rhythm guitar on his cover of Guitar Slim's "The Things That I Used to Do" and the title track, in the latter of which Vaughan carries a worldly message in his lyrics. According to musicologist Andy Aledort, Vaughan's guitar playing throughout the song is marked by steady rhythmic strumming patterns and improvised lead lines, with a distinctive R&B and soul single-note riff, doubled in octaves by guitar and bass.

Couldn't Stand the Weather was released on May 15, 1984, and two weeks later it had rapidly outpaced the sales of Texas Flood. (Note: Three weeks after its release, Couldn't Stand the Weather sold 242,000 copies and was ultimately certified platinum, selling over one million units by the end of the year.) It peaked at number 31 and spent 38 weeks on the charts. The album includes Vaughan's cover of Jimi Hendrix's song, "Voodoo Child (Slight Return)", which provoked inevitable comparisons to Hendrix. According to AllMusic editor Stephen Thomas Erlewine, Couldn't Stand the Weather "confirmed that the acclaimed debut was no fluke, while matching, if not bettering, the sales of its predecessor, thereby cementing Vaughan's status as a giant of modern blues." According to authors Joe Nick Patoski and Bill Crawford, the album "was a major turning point in Stevie Ray Vaughan's development" and Vaughan's singing improved.

==== Carnegie Hall ====
On October 4, 1984, Vaughan headlined a performance at Carnegie Hall that included many guest musicians. For the second half of the concert, he added Jimmie as rhythm guitarist, drummer George Rains, keyboardist Dr. John, Roomful of Blues horn section, and featured vocalist Angela Strehli. (Note: Originally, the Carnegie Hall lineup included keyboardist Booker T. Jones, Tower of Power horn section, and the Golden Echos, the latter of which was a teenage gospel trio from Boston that had never performed outside a church.) The ensemble rehearsed for less than two weeks before the performance, and despite the solid dynamics of Double Trouble for the first half of the performance, according to Patoski and Crawford, the big band concept never entirely took form. (Note: In late September 1984, Double Trouble rehearsed for three days at a sound stage in Austin. On September 29, the twelve-piece band performed two shows at the Caravan of Dreams in Fort Worth, Texas, for a dress rehearsal. On October 1–2, they rehearsed on a sound stage in New York before a quick run-through during soundcheck on the afternoon of the performance.) Before arriving at the engagement, the venue sold out, which made Vaughan overexcited and nervous; he did not calm down until halfway through the third song. The benefit for the T.J. Martell Foundation's work in leukemia and cancer research was an important draw for the event. As his scheduled time slot drew closer, he indicated that he preferred traveling to the venue by limousine to avoid being swarmed by fans on the street; the band took the stage around 8:00 pm. The audience of 2,200 people, which included Vaughan's wife, family and friends, transformed the venue into what Stephen Holden of The New York Times described as "a whistling, stomping roadhouse".

Introduced by Hammond as "one of the greatest guitar players of all time", Vaughan opened with "Scuttle Buttin'", wearing a custom-made mariachi suit he described as a "Mexican tuxedo". (Note: Double Trouble wore mariachi-style suits fabricated by Nelda's Tailors in Austin. They were made out of velvet and decorated with silver buttons, which were sewn by a tailor in Nuevo Laredo. With Layton and Shannon in royal blue suits, Vaughan wore both a royal blue and ruby red suit, for each portion of the performance respectively. An elaborate stage set was built from plywood, painted lapis blue enamel with metallic gold striping.) Double Trouble went on to perform renditions of the Isley Brothers' "Testify", The Jimi Hendrix Experience's "Voodoo Child (Slight Return)", "Tin Pan Alley", Elmore James' "The Sky Is Crying", and W. C. Clark's "Cold Shot", along with four original compositions including "Love Struck Baby", "Honey Bee", "Couldn't Stand the Weather", and "Rude Mood". During the second half of the performance, Vaughan performed covers by Larry Davis, Buddy Guy, Guitar Slim, Albert King, Jackie Wilson, and Albert Collins. The set ended with Vaughan performing solo renditions of "Lenny" and "Rude Mood".

The Dallas Times-Herald wrote that the performance was "full of stomping feet and swaying bodies, kids in blue jeans hanging off the balconies, dancing bodies that clogged the aisles". (Note: According to Patoski and Crawford, some members of the audience were initially reserved during the performance, but a fan shouted, "Stand up. This isn't La traviata.") The New York Times asserted that, despite the venue's "muddy" acoustics, the band's performance was "filled with verve", and Vaughan's playing was "handsomely displayed". Jimmie Vaughan later commented: "I was worried the crowd might be a little stiff. Turned out they're just like any other beer joint." Vaughan commented: "We won't be limited to just the trio, although that doesn't mean we'll stop doing the trio. I'm planning on doing that too. I ain't gonna stay in one place. If I do, I'm stupid." The performance was recorded, and in 1997 Epic Records released Live at Carnegie Hall, which was ultimately certified gold.

After the concert, Vaughan attended a private party at a downtown club in New York, which was sponsored by MTV, where he was greeted by an hour's worth of supporters. On the following day, Double Trouble made an appearance at a record store in Greenwich Village, where they signed autographs for fans. (Note: According to Hopkins, Double Trouble signed autographs for over 500 fans, an appearance which lasted for two and a half hours; the line of fans stretched out of the door onto Broadway and around the corner.)

In late October 1984, the band toured Australia and New Zealand, which included one of their first appearances on Australian television—on Hey Hey It's Saturday—where they performed "Texas Flood", and an interview on Sounds. On November 5 and 9, they played sold-out concerts at the Sydney Opera House. After returning to the U.S., Double Trouble went on a brief tour in California. Soon afterward, Vaughan and Lenny went to the island of Saint Croix, part of the U.S. Virgin Islands, where they had spent some time vacationing in December. The next month, Double Trouble flew to Japan, where they appeared for five performances, including at Kōsei Nenkin Kaikan in Osaka.

==== Soul to Soul ====
In March 1985, recording for Double Trouble's third studio album, Soul to Soul, began at the Dallas Sound Lab. As the sessions progressed, Vaughan became increasingly frustrated with his own lack of inspiration. He was also allowed a relaxed pace of recording the album, which contributed to a lack of focus due to excesses in alcohol and other drugs. Roadie Byron Barr later recalled: "the routine was to go to the studio, do dope, and play ping-pong." Vaughan, who found it increasingly difficult to be able to play rhythm guitar parts and sing at the same time, wanted to add another dimension to the band, so he hired keyboardist Reese Wynans to record on the album; he joined the band soon thereafter.

During the album's production, Vaughan appeared at the Houston Astrodome on April 10, 1985, where he performed a slide guitar rendition of the U.S. national anthem, "The Star-Spangled Banner"; his performance was met with booing. Upon leaving the stage, Vaughan acquired an autograph from former player for the New York Yankees, Mickey Mantle. Astrodome publicist Molly Glentzer wrote in the Houston Press: "As Vaughan shuffled back behind home plate, he was only lucid enough to know that he wanted Mickey Mantle's autograph. Mantle obliged. 'I never signed a guitar before.' Nobody asked Vaughan for his autograph. I was sure he'd be dead before he hit 30." Critics associated his performance with Jimi Hendrix's rendition at Woodstock in 1969, yet Vaughan disliked this comparison: "I heard they even wrote about it in one of the music magazines and they tried to put the two versions side by side. I hate that stuff. His version was great."

Released on September 30, 1985, Soul to Soul peaked at number 34 and remained on the Billboard 200 through mid-1986, eventually certified gold. (Note: The Soul to Soul album cover was taken at the Anderson Mill Garden Club in Volente, Texas.) Critic Jimmy Guterman of Rolling Stone wrote: "there's some life left in their blues rock pastiche; it's also possible that they've run out of gas." According to Patoski and Crawford, sales of the album "did not match Couldn't Stand the Weather, suggesting Stevie Ray and Double Trouble were plateauing". Vaughan commented: "as far as what's on there song-wise, I like the album a lot. It meant a lot to us what we went through to get this record. There were a lot of odds and we still stayed strong. We grew a lot with the people in the band and immediate friends around us; we learned a lot and grew a lot closer. That has a lot to do with why it's called [Soul to Soul]."

==== Live Alive ====
After touring for nine and a half months, Epic requested a fourth album from Double Trouble as part of their contractual obligation. In July 1986, Vaughan decided that they would record the LP, Live Alive, during three live appearances in Austin and Dallas. On July 17 and 18, the band performed sold-out concerts at the Austin Opera House, and July 19 at the Dallas Starfest. They used recordings of these concerts to assemble the LP, which was produced by Vaughan. Shannon was backstage before the Austin concert and predicted to new manager Alex Hodges that both Vaughan and he were "headed for a brick wall". Guitarist Denny Freeman attended the Austin performances; he called the shows a "musical mess, because they would go into these chaotic jams with no control. I didn't know what exactly was going on, but I was concerned." Both Layton and Shannon remarked that their work schedule and drugs were causing the band to lose focus. According to Wynans: "Things were getting illogical and crazy."

The Live Alive album was released on November 17, 1986, and was the only official live Double Trouble LP made commercially available during Vaughan's lifetime, though it never appeared on the Billboard 200 chart. Though many critics claimed that most of the album was overdubbed, engineer Gary Olazabal, who mixed the album, asserted that most of the material was recorded poorly. Vaughan later admitted that it was not one of his better efforts; he recalled: "I wasn't in very good shape when we recorded Live Alive. At the time, I didn't realize how bad a shape I was in. There were more fix-it jobs done on the album than I would have liked. Some of the work sounds like [it was] the work of half-dead people. There were some great notes that came out, but I just wasn't in control; nobody was."

==== Drugs and alcohol ====
In 1960 when Vaughan was six years old, he began stealing his father's drinks. Drawn in by its effects, he started making his own drinks and this resulted in alcohol dependence. He explained: "that's when I first started stealing daddy's drinks. Or when my parents were gone, I'd find the bottle and make myself one. I thought it was cool ... thought the kids down the street would think it was cool. That's where it began, and I had been depending on it ever since." According to the authors Joe Nick Patoski and Bill Crawford: "In the ensuing twenty-five years, he had worked his way through the Physicians' Desk Reference before finding his poisons of preference—alcohol and cocaine."

Stevie and I reached this point where we had to have the drugs and alcohol all the time. If the phone would ring in the morning and wake us up, we couldn't answer the phone before we had some alcohol.

— Tommy Shannon

While Vaughan asserted that he first experienced the effects of cocaine when a doctor prescribed him a liquid solution containing it as a nasal spray, according to Patoski and Crawford, the earliest that Vaughan is known to have used it is in 1975, while performing with the Cobras. Before that, Vaughan had briefly used other drugs such as cannabis, methamphetamine, and Quaaludes, the brand name for methaqualone. After 1975, he regularly drank whiskey and used cocaine, particularly mixing the two substances together. According to Hopkins, by the time of Double Trouble's European tour in September 1986, "his lifestyle of substance abuse had reached a peak, probably better characterized as the bottom of a deep chasm."

At the height of Vaughan's substance abuse, he drank 1 US quart (0.95 L) of whiskey and used one-quarter of an ounce (7 g) of cocaine each day. Personal assistant Tim Duckworth explained: "I would make sure he would eat breakfast instead of waking up drinking every morning, which was probably the worst thing he was doing." According to Vaughan: "it got to the point where if I'd try to say "hi" to somebody, I would just fall apart crying. It was like solid doom."

In September 1986, Double Trouble traveled to Denmark for a one-month tour of Europe. During the late night hours of September 28, Vaughan became ill after a performance in Ludwigshafen, Germany, suffering from near-death dehydration, for which he received medical treatment. The incident resulted in his checking into The London Clinic under the care of Dr. Victor Bloom, who warned him that he was a month away from death. After staying in London for more than a week, he returned to the United States and entered Peachford Hospital in Atlanta, where he spent four weeks in rehabilitation, and then checked into rehab in Austin.

==== Live Alive tour ====
In November 1986, following his departure from rehab, Vaughan moved back into his mother's Glenfield Avenue house in Dallas, which is where he had spent much of his childhood. During this time, Double Trouble began rehearsals for the Live Alive tour. Although Vaughan was nervous about performing after achieving sobriety, he received positive reassurance. Wynans later recalled: "Stevie was real worried about playing after he'd gotten sober...he didn't know if he had anything left to offer. Once we got back out on the road, he was very inspired and motivated." The tour began on November 23 at Towson State University, which was Vaughan's first performance with Double Trouble after rehab. On December 31, 1986, they played a concert at Atlanta's Fox Theatre, which featured encore performances with Lonnie Mack. (Note: A portion of the show was broadcast on local radio, but as of 2014, only one song has officially been released.)

As the tour progressed, Vaughan was longing to work on material for his next LP, but in January 1987, he filed for divorce from Lenny, which restricted him from any projects until the proceedings were finalized. This prevented him from writing and recording songs for almost two years, but Double Trouble wrote the song "Crossfire" with Bill Carter and Ruth Ellsworth. Layton recalled: "we wrote the music, and they had to write the lyrics. We had just gotten together; Stevie was unable to be there at that time. He was in Dallas doing some things, and we just got together and started writing some songs. That was the first one we wrote." On August 6, 1987, Double Trouble appeared at the Austin Aqua Festival, where they played to one of the largest audiences of their career. According to biographer Craig Hopkins, as many as 20,000 people attended the concert. Following a month-long tour as the opening act for Robert Plant in May 1988, which included a concert at Toronto's Maple Leaf Gardens, the band was booked for a European leg, which included 22 performances, and ended in Oulu, Finland on July 17. This would be Vaughan's last concert appearance in Europe.

==== In Step ====
After Vaughan's divorce from Lenora "Lenny" Darlene Bailey became final, recording for Double Trouble's fourth and final studio album, In Step, began at Kiva Studios in Memphis, Tennessee, working with producer Jim Gaines and co-songwriter Doyle Bramhall. Initially, he had doubts about his musical and creative abilities after achieving sobriety, but he gained confidence as the sessions progressed. Shannon later recalled: "In Step was, for him, a big growing experience. In my opinion, it's our best studio album, and I think he felt that way, too." Bramhall, who had also entered rehab, wrote songs with Vaughan about addiction and redemption. According to Vaughan, the album was titled In Step because "I'm finally in step with life, in step with myself, in step with my music." The album's liner notes include the quote; "'thank God the elevator's broken," a reference to the twelve-step program proposed by Alcoholics Anonymous (AA).

After the In Step recording sessions moved to Los Angeles, Vaughan added horn players Joe Sublett and Darrell Leonard, who played saxophone and trumpet respectively on both "Crossfire" and "Love Me Darlin'". Shortly before the album's production was complete, Vaughan and Double Trouble appeared at a presidential inaugural party in Washington, D.C. for George H. W. Bush. In Step was released on June 13, 1989, and eight months later, it was certified gold. The album was Vaughan's most commercially successful release and his first one to win a Grammy Award. It peaked at number 33 on the Billboard 200, spending 47 weeks on the chart. In Step included the song, "Crossfire", which was written by Double Trouble, Bill Carter, and Ruth Ellsworth; it became his only number one hit. The album also included one of his first recordings to feature the use of a Fuzz Face on Vaughan's cover of the Howlin' Wolf song, "Love Me Darlin'".

In July 1989, Neil Perry, a writer for Sounds magazine, wrote: "the album closes with the brow-soothing swoon of 'Riviera Paradise,' a slow, lengthy guitar and piano workout that proves just why Vaughan is to the guitar what Nureyev is to ballet." According to music journalist Robert Christgau, Vaughan was "writing blues for AA...he escapes the blues undamaged for the first time in his career." In October 1989, the Boca Raton News described Vaughan's guitar solos as "determined, clear-headed and downright stinging" and his lyrics as "tension-filled allegories".

== Death ==
On Monday, August 27, 1990, at 12:50 a.m. (CDT), Vaughan and members of Eric Clapton's touring entourage played an all-star encore jam session at Alpine Valley Music Theatre in Alpine Valley Resort in East Troy, Wisconsin. They then left for Midway International Airport in Chicago in a Bell 206B helicopter, the most common way for acts to enter and exit the venue, as there is only one road in and out, heavily used by fans. The helicopter crashed into a nearby ski hill shortly after takeoff. Vaughan and the four others on board—pilot Jeff Brown, agent Bobby Brooks, bodyguard Nigel Browne, and tour manager Colin Smythe—died. The helicopter was owned by Chicago-based company Omniflight Helicopters. The Elkhorn coroner's inquest found that all five men died instantly.

The investigation determined the aircraft departed in foggy conditions with visibility reportedly under 2 mi (3.2 km), according to a local forecast. The National Transportation Safety Board report stated: "As the third helicopter was departing, it remained at a lower altitude than the others, and the pilot turned southeasterly toward rising terrain. Subsequently, the helicopter crashed on hilly terrain about three-fifths of a mile from the takeoff point." Federal Aviation Administration (FAA) records showed that Brown was qualified to fly by instruments in a fixed-wing aircraft, but not in a helicopter. Toxicology tests performed on the victims revealed no traces of drugs or alcohol in their systems. Vaughan's funeral service was held on August 31, 1990, at Laurel Land Cemetery in Dallas, Texas. His wooden casket quickly became adorned with bouquets of flowers. An estimated 3,000 mourners joined a procession led by a white hearse. Among those at the public ceremony were Jeff Healey, Charlie Sexton, ZZ Top, Colin James, Stevie Wonder, Bonnie Raitt and Buddy Guy. Vaughan's grave marker reads: "Thank you ... for all the love you passed our way."

Vaughan's older brother, guitarist Jimmie Vaughan, was reputedly so devastated by his death that he almost quit playing guitar.

== Musical style ==
Video of Stevie Ray Vaughan in Ardent studios in Memphis in 1989, doing a sound check before recording a solo for Italian artist Zucchero.

Vaughan's music was rooted in blues, rock, and jazz. He was influenced by Johnny Winter, Jimi Hendrix, Albert King, Lonnie Mack, B.B. King, Freddie King, Albert Collins, Johnny "Guitar" Watson, Buddy Guy, Howlin' Wolf, Otis Rush, Guitar Slim, Chuck Berry, and Muddy Waters. According to nightclub owner Clifford Antone, who opened Antone's in 1975, Vaughan jammed with Albert King at Antone's in July 1977 and it almost "scared him to death", saying "it was the best [I] ever saw Albert or the best I ever saw Stevie". Vaughan was also influenced by such jazz guitarists as Django Reinhardt, Wes Montgomery, Kenny Burrell, and George Benson.

In 1987, Vaughan listed Lonnie Mack first among the guitarists he had listened to, both as a youngster and as an adult. Vaughan observed that Mack was "ahead of his time" and said, "I got a lot of my fast stuff from Lonnie". On another occasion, Vaughan said that he had learned tremolo picking and vibrato from Mack and that Mack had taught him to "play guitar from the heart." Mack recalled his first meeting with Vaughan in 1978:

We was in Texas looking for pickers, and we went out to see the Thunderbirds. Jimmie was saying, 'Man, you gotta hear my little brother. He plays all your [songs].' He was playing a little place called the Rome Inn, and we went over there and checked him out. As it would be, when I walked in the door, he was playing 'Wham!' And I said, 'Dadgum.' He was playing it right. I'd been playing it wrong for a long time and needed to go back and listen to my original record. That was in '78, I believe.

Vaughan's relationship with another Texas blues legend, Johnny Winter, was a little more complex. Although they met several times, and often played sessions with the same musicians or even performed the same material, as in the case of "Boot Hill," Vaughan always refrained from acknowledging Winter in any form. In his biography, Raisin' Cain, Winter says that he was unnerved after reading Vaughan stating in an interview that he never met or knew Johnny Winter. "We even played together over at Tommy Shannon's house one time." Vaughan settled the issue in 1988 on the occasion of a blues festival in Europe where both he and Winter were on the bill, explaining that he has been misquoted and that "Every musician in Texas knows Johnny and has learned something from him". Asked to compare their playing styles in an interview in 2010, Winter admitted that "mine's a little bit rawer, I think."

== Equipment ==
=== Guitars ===
Vaughan owned and used a variety of guitars during his career. His guitar of choice, and the instrument that he became most associated with, was the Fender Stratocaster, his favorite being a 1963 body with a 1962 neck and pickups dated from 1959; hence Vaughan usually referring to it as a "1959 Strat". He explained why he favored this guitar in a 1983 interview: "I like the strength of its sound. Any guitar I play has got to be pretty versatile. It's got a big, strong tone and it'll take anything I do to it." Vaughan also referred to this instrument as his "first wife", or "Number One". Another favorite guitar was a slightly later Strat he named 'Lenny' after his wife, Lenora. While at a local pawn shop in 1980, Vaughan had noticed this particular guitar, a 1965 Stratocaster that had been refinished in red, with the original sunburst finish peeking through. It also had a 1910 Mandolin inlay just below the bridge. The pawn shop was asking $300 for it, which was way more than Vaughan had at the time. Lenny saw how badly he wanted this guitar, so she got six of their friends to chip in $50 each, and bought it for him. The guitar was presented to him on his birthday in 1980, and that night, after bringing "Lenny" (the guitar, and wife) home with him, he wrote the song, "Lenny". He had started using a borrowed Stratocaster during high school and used Stratocasters predominantly in his live performances and recordings, although he did play other guitars, including custom guitars.

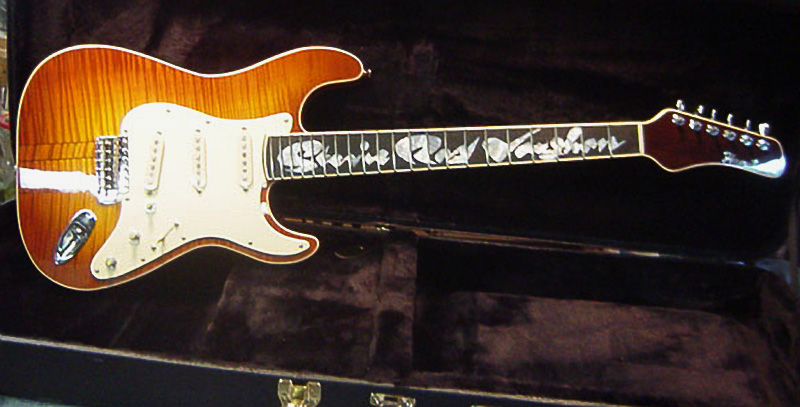
Jim Hamilton-signed Stevie Ray Vaughan reproduction guitar#01

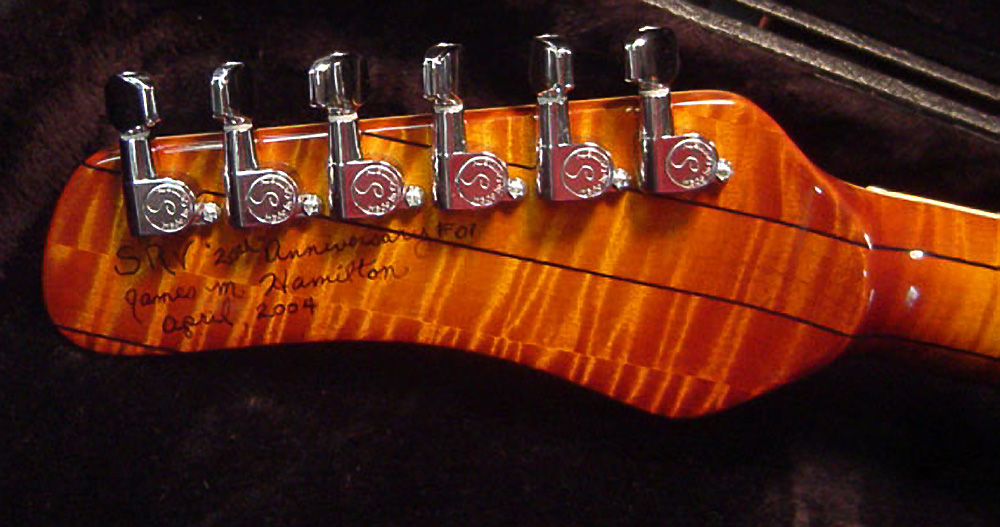
Jim Hamilton signature on rear of headstock

One of the custom guitars—nicknamed "Main"—was built by James Hamilton of Hamiltone Guitars in Buffalo, New York. It was a gift from Billy Gibbons of ZZ Top. Gibbons had commissioned Hamilton to build the guitar in 1979. There were some delays, including having to re-do the mother of pearl inlay of Vaughan's name on the fretboard when he changed his stage name from Stevie Vaughan to Stevie Ray Vaughan. The guitar was presented to him by Jim Hamilton on April 29, 1984. Hamilton recalls that Stevie Ray Vaughan was so happy with the guitar that he played it that night at Springfest on the University of Buffalo campus. It remained one of the main guitars he used on stage and in studio. Vaughan made some alterations to the guitar, including replacing the bronze color Gibson knobs with white Fender knobs, as he preferred the ribbing on the Fender knobs. The pickups had to be changed after the guitar was used in the "Couldn't Stand the Weather" video, in which Stevie and "Main" were drenched with water, and the pickups were ruined. Vaughan's preferred guitar has been summarized as his,

Number One Strat, which Stevie claimed to be a '59, since that was the date stamped on the back of the pickups… this was incorrect, however, as guitar tech Rene Martinez (who oversaw SRV's guitars since 1980) found the stamp of 1963 on the body and 1962 on the original neck (the neck was replaced in 1989 after it could no longer be refretted properly; Rene used the neck from another SRV favorite, "Red", as it was also a 1962 model). The pickups are also relatively low output, not the hot overwound myth that gained legs during the 80s… all 3 pickups are rumored to be under 6k ohms output impedance, which would be typical of a 1959 set (the neck pickups tended to be hottest, but not by much). Although the Fender SRV signature model uses Texas Special pickups, which Stevie was heavily involved in the making of, they do not accurately represent the sound of his original Number One.

Vaughan bought many Stratocasters and gave some away as gifts. A sunburst Diplomat Strat-style guitar was purchased by Vaughan and given to his girlfriend Janna Lapidus to learn to play on. Vaughan used a custom set of uncommonly heavy strings, gauges .013, .015, .019 (plain), .028, .038, .058, and tuned a half-step below standard tuning. With these heavy string sizes, it was not uncommon for him to separate his fingernail because of his quick movement along the strings. The owner of an Austin club recalled Vaughan coming into the office between sets to borrow super glue, which he used to keep a fingernail split from widening while he continued to play. The super glue was suggested by Rene Martinez, who was Stevie's guitar technician. Martinez eventually convinced Stevie to change to slightly lighter strings. He preferred a guitar neck with an asymmetrical profile (thicker at the top), which was more comfortable for his thumb-over style of playing. Heavy use of the vibrato bar necessitated frequent replacements; Vaughan often had his roadie, Byron Barr, obtain custom stainless steel bars made by Barr's father. As for his usage of plectrums, Vaughan preferred Fender medium gauge guitar picks, using one of the rounder shoulders of the pick rather than the pointed tip to pluck and strum the strings.

Vaughan was also photographed playing a Rickenbacker Capri, a National Duolian, Epiphone Riviera, Gibson Flying V, Benedict Thin Line Strat (made in Minneapolis) as well as several other models. Vaughan used a Gibson Johnny Smith to record "Stang's Swang", and a Guild 12-string acoustic for his performance on MTV Unplugged in January 1990. On June 24, 2004, one of Vaughan's Stratocasters, the aforementioned "Lenny" strat, was sold at an auction to benefit Eric Clapton's Crossroads Centre in Antigua; the instrument was bought by Guitar Center for $623,500.

=== Amplifiers and effects ===
Vaughan was a catalyst in the revival of vintage amplifiers and effects during the 1980s. His loud volume required powerful and robust amplifiers. Vaughan used two black-face Fender Super Reverbs, which were crucial in shaping his clear overdriven sound. He would often blend other amps with the Super Reverbs, including black-face Fender Vibroverbs, and brands including Dumble and Marshall, which he used for his clean sound.

While an Ibanez Tube Screamer and a Vox wah-wah pedal were his mainstay effects, Vaughan experimented with a range of effects. He used a Fender Vibratone, designed as a Leslie speaker for electric guitars which provided a warbling chorus effect; it can be heard on the track "Cold Shot". He used a vintage Dallas Arbiter Fuzz Face that can be heard on In Step, as well as an Octavia. The Guitar Geek website provides a detailed illustration of Vaughan's 1985 equipment set up based on interviews with his guitar tech and effects builder, Cesar Diaz.

== Legacy ==
Vaughan throughout his career revived blues rock and paved the way for many other artists. Vaughan's work continues to influence numerous blues, rock, and alternative artists, including John Mayer, Kenny Wayne Shepherd, Mike McCready, Albert Cummings, Los Lonely Boys and Chris Duarte among others. AllMusic's Stephen Thomas Erlewine described Vaughan as "the leading light in American blues" who developed "a uniquely eclectic and fiery style that sounded like no other guitarist, regardless of genre". In 1983, Variety magazine called Vaughan the "guitar hero of the present era".

In the months that followed his death, Vaughan sold over 5.5 million albums in the United States. On September 25, 1990, Epic released Family Style, an LP the Vaughan brothers cut at Ardent Studios in Memphis, Tennessee. The label released several promotional singles and videos for the collaborative effort. In November 1990, CMV Enterprises released Pride and Joy, a collection of eight Double Trouble music videos. Sony signed a deal with the Vaughan estate to obtain control of his back catalog, as well as permission to release albums with previously unreleased material and new collections of released work. On October 29, 1991, The Sky Is Crying was released as Vaughan's first posthumous album with Double Trouble, and featured studio recordings from 1984 to 1985. Other compilations, live albums, and films have also been released since his death.

On October 3, 1991, Texas governor Ann Richards proclaimed "Stevie Ray Vaughan Commemoration Day", during which a memorial concert was held at the Texas Theatre. In 1993, a memorial statue of Vaughan was unveiled on Auditorium Shores and is the first public monument of a musician in Austin. In September 1994, a Stevie Ray Vaughan Memorial Run for Recovery was held in Dallas; the event was a benefit for the Ethel Daniels Foundation, established to help those in recovery from alcoholism and drug addiction who cannot afford treatment. In 1999, the Musicians' Assistance Program (later renamed MusiCares MAP Fund) created the "Stevie Ray Vaughan Award" to honor the memory of Vaughan and to recognize musicians for their devotion to helping other addicts struggling with the recovery process. The recipients include Eric Clapton, David Crosby, Steven Tyler, Alice Cooper, Ozzy Osbourne, Pete Townshend, Chris Cornell, Jerry Cantrell, Mike McCready and many among others. In 1993, Martha Vaughan established the Stevie Ray Vaughan Memorial Scholarship Fund, awarded to students at W.E. Greiner Middle School in Oak Cliff who intend to attend college and pursue the arts as a profession.

=== Awards and honors ===
Vaughan won five W. C. Handy Awards and was posthumously inducted into the Blues Hall of Fame in 2000. In 1985, he was named an honorary admiral in the Texas Navy. Vaughan had a single number-one hit on the Hot Mainstream Rock Tracks chart for the song "Crossfire". His album sales in the U.S. stand at over 15 million units. Family Style, released shortly after his death, won the 1991 Grammy Award for Best Contemporary Blues Album and became his best-selling, non-Double Trouble studio album with over a million shipments in the U.S. In 2003, Rolling Stone ranked him seventh among the "100 Greatest Guitar Players of All Time", with a 2023 update placing him 20th. He also became eligible for the Rock and Roll Hall of Fame in 2008, but did not appear on a nominations roster until 2014. He was inducted in the RRHOF alongside Double Trouble in 2015. Guitar World magazine ranked him as Number One in its list of the greatest blues guitarists.

In 1994 the city of Austin, Texas, erected the Stevie Ray Vaughan Memorial on the hiking trail beside Lady Bird Lake.

== Discography ==
- Texas Flood (1983)
- Couldn't Stand the Weather (1984)
- Soul to Soul (1985)
- In Step (1989)
- Family Style (1990)
- The Sky Is Crying (1991)

== See also ==
- 1980s in music
- List of blues rock musicians
- List of electric blues musicians
- List of guitarists
- List of Texas blues musicians
- Music of Austin, Texas
- Music of Texas

== Notes ==
=== Citations ===
Biography. (n.d.). The Official Stevie Ray Vaughan Site. Retrieved April 24, 2024, from https://www.srvofficial.com/biography/

Cummings, T. (2023). Documentary about Jimmie and Stevie Ray Vaughan tells untold stories: Dallas Morning News, The (TX). In Dallas Morning News, The (TX) (Dallas Morning News, The (TX)). Dallas Morning News, The (TX). https://search.ebscohost.com/login.aspx?direct=true&AuthType=shib&db=nfh&AN=2W61370259651&authtype=sso&custid=s8441008&site=ehost-live&scope=site

== Sources ==
- Aledort, Andy (August 2000). "Stevie Ray Vaughan: The Guitar World Tribute". Guitar World.
- "Billboard Hot 100". Billboard. June 1983.
- "Cesar Diaz Interview". The ToneQuest Report. Vol. 1, no. 10. August 2000.
- Corcoran, Michael (March 26, 1987). "Alive and well: Texas bluesman SRV conquers the urge to splurge". Dallas Observer.
- Crawford, Bill (October 6, 1995). "Stevie Ray Vaughan: The Artistic Afterlife". The Austin Chronicle.
- Evans, Steve; Middlebrook, Ron (2002). Cowboy Guitars. Centerstream Publishing. ISBN 978-1-57424-102-0.
- Fricke, David (February 22, 2007). "The New Guitar Gods: John Mayer, John Frusciante and Derek Trucks". Rolling Stone. Archived from the original on March 27, 2010.
- Gill, Chris (2010). "Stevie Ray Vaughan: Lone Star Rising".
- Gill, Chris (October 3, 2013). "Thirty Years After 'Texas Flood,' Guitar World Celebrates the Phenomenal Rise of Stevie Ray Vaughan". Guitar World.
- Greene, Andy (October 9, 2014). "Green Day, Nine Inch Nails, Smiths Nominated for Rock Hall of Fame". Rolling Stone. Archived from the original on October 19, 2014.
- Gregory, Hugh (2003). Roadhouse Blues: Stevie Ray Vaughan and Texas R&B. Hal Leonard Corporation. ISBN 978-0-87930-747-9.
- Holden, Stephen (October 8, 1984). "Stevie Ray Vaughan, guitarist, at Carnegie Hall". The New York Times.
- Holland, Brian D. (May 29, 2005). "Albert Cummings Interview". Modern Guitars. Archived from the original on July 5, 2008.
- Hopkins, Craig (September 15, 2010). Stevie Ray Vaughan – Day by Day, Night After Night: His Early Years, 1954–1982. Backbeat Books. ISBN 978-1-4234-8598-8.
- Hopkins, Craig (October 18, 2011). Stevie Ray Vaughan – Day by Day, Night After Night: His Final Years, 1983–1990. Backbeat Books. ISBN 978-1-61774-022-0.
- Jordan, Oscar (August 2011). "Kenny Wayne Shepherd – How He Goes". Premier Guitar. Archived from the original on April 16, 2012.
- Kopp, Bill (February 23, 2010). "Interview: Johnny Winter". Blog.musoscribe.com.
- Larkin, Colin (2006). Encyclopedia of Popular Music. Oxford University Press. ISBN 978-0-19-531373-4.
- McBride, James (March 1985). "You Can Take the Boy Out of Texas, but You Can't Take Texas Out of Blues' Golden Boy Stevie Ray Vaughan". People.
- Menn, Don, ed. (1992). Secrets From The Masters. Miller-Freeman, Inc. ISBN 0-87930-260-7.
- Milkowski, Bill (September 1988). "A Focused Stevie Ray Vaughan Comes Clean". Guitar World.
- "My Guitar Heroes". Request. July 10, 1989.
- Nixon, Bruce (June 1983). "Playing the Blues for Bowie". Record. Vol. 2, no. 8. p. 21.
- Nixon, Bruce (November 1985). "Stevie Ray Vaughan discusses fame, Hendrix and his new album, 'Soul To Soul'". Guitar World.
- Patoski, Joe Nick; Crawford, Bill (1993). Stevie Ray Vaughan: Caught in the Crossfire. Little, Brown and Company. ISBN 978-0-316-16069-8.
- Paul, Alan (August 1999). "Blue Smoke". Guitar World.
- Perry, Neil (July 1, 1989). "A Small Step for Mankind". Sounds.
- Prial, Dunstan (2006). The Producer: John Hammond and the Soul of American Music. Farrar, Straus and Giroux. ISBN 978-0-312-42600-2.
- Reid, Jan (July 5, 2010). The Improbable Rise of Redneck Rock. University of Texas Press. ISBN 978-0-292-78776-6.
- "Reviews". Boca Raton News. October 13, 1989.
- Rhodes, Joe (October 11, 1984). "Even now, Stevie Ray has to pinch himself". Dallas Times-Herald.
- Rhodes, Joe (October 6, 1984). "Stevie Ray wows Carnegie crowd". Dallas Times-Herald.
- Rosen, Steven (October 29, 1985). "Stevie Ray Vaughan Interview". Modern Guitars. Archived from the original on November 17, 2006.
- Rotondi, James (January 1994). "Blood on the Tracks". Guitar Player.
- Santelli, Robert (October 1985). "Stratocasting the Blues with a Touch of Texas". Music & Sound Output.
- Schwartz, Andy (1997). Live at Carnegie Hall (booklet). Epic Records.
- Smith, Troy L. (March 4, 2015). "Rock Hall confirms members of Paul Butterfield Blues Band, the Blackhearts and Double Trouble being inducted". Cleveland Plain Dealer.
- Sullivan, Mary Lou (2010). Raisin' Cain: The Wild and Raucous Story of Johnny Winter. Backbeat Books. ISBN 978-0-87930-973-2.
- "Stevie Ray Vaughan". Variety. December 1983.
