= Lenny (instrumental) =

1982 song by Stevie Ray Vaughan

Song by Stevie Ray Vaughan and Double Trouble

from the album Texas Flood
- Released: June 13, 1983
- Recorded: November 24, 1982
- Genre: Electric blues Blues rock Instrumental ballad
- Length: 4:59
- Label: Epic Records
- Songwriter: Stevie Ray Vaughan
- Producers: Stevie Ray Vaughan; Richard Mullen; Double Trouble

"Lenny" is the tenth and final track on the first Stevie Ray Vaughan and Double Trouble album Texas Flood. The song is in 4/4 time and notated in the key of E flat major (but instruments are tuned down a half-step, so the chordal structure is in E). It is played very slowly and freely, with Vaughan alternating between jazz-inflected chords and solo runs. The main chord featured in the song is a movable major 6th chord to which Vaughan applies moderate vibrato with the tremolo bar. The solos incorporate the E major scale, the E minor pentatonic scale, and the E Minor blues scale. Its style is influenced by Jimi Hendrix ballads like "The Wind Cries Mary". The song was written and named for Vaughan's wife at the time, Lenora. Vaughan also named one of his guitars "Lenny", which he used on "Lenny" and on his later instrumental ballad, "Riviera Paradise". The track was often played at live shows.
