= Albert Cummings =

American blues musician

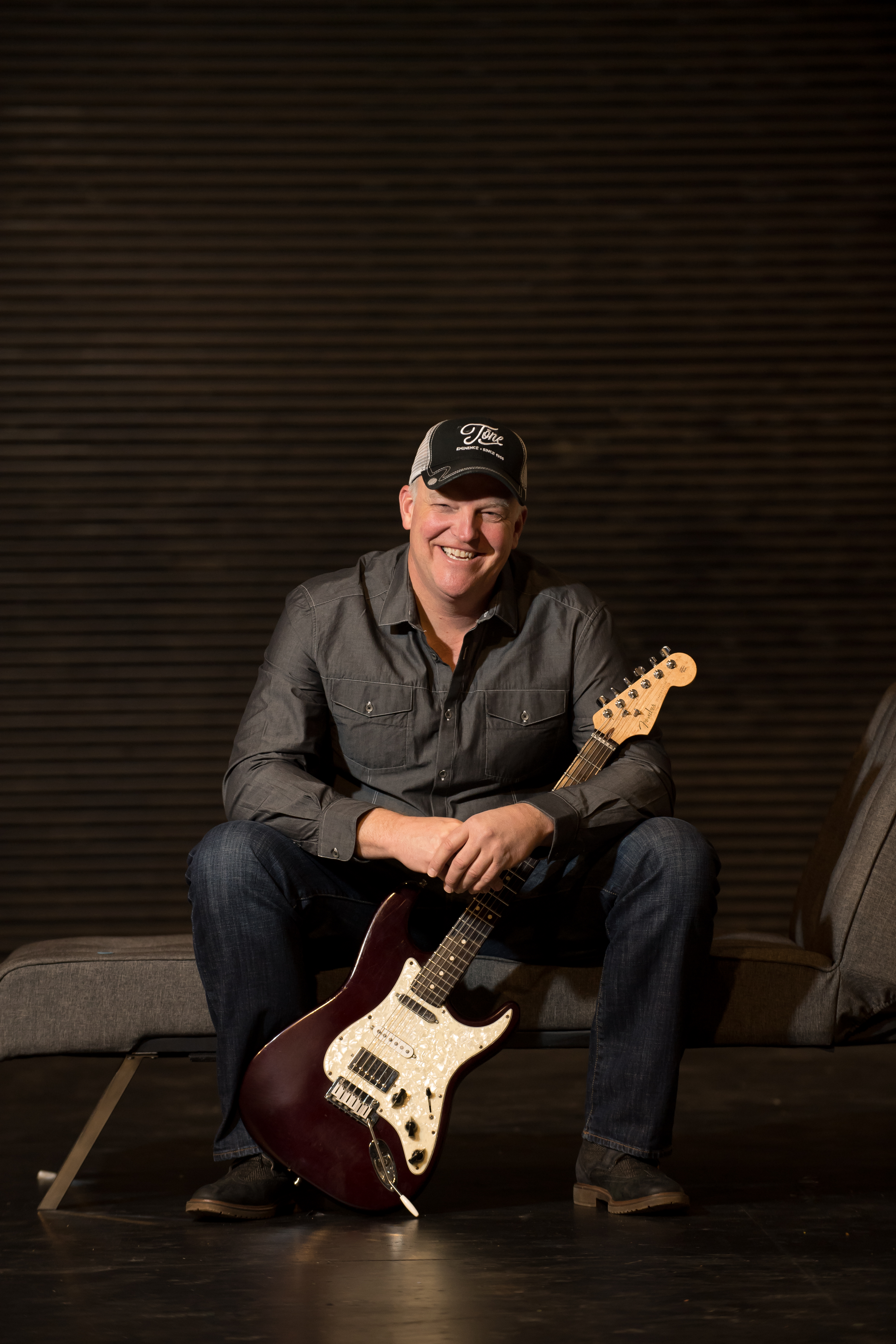

Background information
- Born: Williamstown, Massachusetts, U.S.
- Genres: Blues
- Instrument: Guitar
- Years active: 1999–present
- Label: Provogue Records
- Website: albertcummings.com

Albert Cummings is an American blues musician recording music with Blind Pig Records. He is known for playing with other artists with B.B. King, Johnny Winter, and Buddy Guy.

== Biography ==
Cummings began playing the five-string banjo at the age of twelve, and developed a love for bluegrass music. In his late twenties, Cummings formed a trio called "Swamp Yankee." In 1999, the band released an independently produced album, The Long Way.

After the album’s release, the band went on the Northeast blues circuit. In 1999, Cummings competed in the Blues Foundation's International Blues Challenge, in Memphis. The following year, he released his debut recording The Long Way.

He later worked with Double Trouble and the late Stevie Ray Vaughan's rhythm section. Bassist Tommy Shannon and drummer Chris Layton voluntarily played on and produced Cummings' solo debut recording, self-released, From the Heart in 2003. Recorded in Austin, Texas, it featured Cummings fronting Double Trouble (including Reese Wynans) in their first recording project since Stevie Ray’s passing.

In 2004, Cummings signed a multi-album deal with Blind Pig Records. Shannon remained as the bassist for Cummings' next album, True To Yourself, released in 2004.

In 2006, Cummings recorded a fourth album, Working Man, with new band members.

In 2008, Cummings released a live album, Feels So Good, recorded at the Colonial Theater in Pittsfield, Massachusetts.

In 2011, Cummings released an instructional DVD for the Hal Leonard Corporation entitled, Working Man Blues Guitar. His 2012 album No Regrets debuted at No. 1 in the U.S., Canada and Franc] on the iTunes Blues Charts and at No. 5 on the Billboard blues chart.

In July 2015, Cummings released Someone Like You, a 12-track Blind Pig album produced by David Z.

In February 2020, Cummings released his 11-track Provogue Records debut, titled Believe, produced by Grammy Award-winning producer Jim Gaines. Recording at FAME Studios in Muscle Shoals, Alabama, influenced the creation of the project. One of the tracks on the album is a cover of the song "Hold On", originally by Sam & Dave.

On April 8, 2022, Cummings released Ten, a 13-track Ivy Music Company album produced by Grammy Award-winning producer Chuck Ainlay. A Blues Rock Review article described the compilation as "the blues rocker's gone country" suggesting that in this album Cummings reveals "discovered depth and complexity within a new style".

Cummings' tenth album, Strong, was released on February 16, 2024.

== Discography ==
- The Long Way (Albert Cummings and Swamp Yankee), 2000
- From the Heart, 2003
- True to Yourself, 2004
- Working Man, 2006
- Feel So Good, 2008
- No Regrets, 2012
- Someone Like You, 2015
- Believe, 2020
- Ten, 2022
- Strong, 2024
