= César Díaz (guitarist) =

PuertoRico-born guitarist (1951–2002)

César Carrillo Díaz (July 13, 1951 – April 26, 2002) was a Puerto Rican-born guitar amplifier technician and guitarist who worked with a number of high-profile musicians, most notably Stevie Ray Vaughan, as well as Bob Dylan, Eric Clapton, Keith Richards, Neil Young, and others. Guitar World dubbed him "The Amp Doctor" for his work in tube amplifier repair and modification.

== Biography ==
As a native of Puerto Rico, Díaz was playing guitar by the age of six. Listening to records by Robert Johnson and Sonny Terry sparked an early love for blues music. At 12, he was guitarist for The Hungry Men, where he would remain until 1969, when he came to the mainland with Johnny Nash (of "I Can See Clearly, Now" fame), before moving on to join Frijid Pink. In 1970, he met G. E. Smith, and they were friends ever since. During the 1970s, Díaz played a major role in the then-developing market for vintage tube-powered guitar amplifiers. In 1979, Díaz befriended the as-yet-unsigned Stevie Ray Vaughan, and ended up as his amplifier technician.

By the early 1980s, Díaz was designing and building prototypes that would become his own line of guitar equipment. The early 1980s also saw many partnerships with companies such as Angela Instruments and John Sprung's American Guitar Center. In 1984, Diaz met Eric Clapton through a member of The Rolling Stones' camp; he worked with the Stones and Keith Richards from 1982 to 1987 and would continue the relationship until his death, locating and restoring vintage amplifiers for Clapton and Richards. Díaz served as Clapton's technical adviser on the Journeyman album.

In 1988, G. E. Smith, who had just joined Bob Dylan's band, brought Cesar on board to tend to the two guitarists' gear and tone. After G.E. left the band, Díaz played some 50 dates with Dylan, including a show for the Lifetime Achievement Grammy Dylan won in 1991, and in 1993 left Dylan to devote his time to his amplifier business.

== Diaz Amplifiers ==
Díaz began to manufacture amplifiers and guitar effects—hand-made, in small production runs. His amplifiers are built in the Fender tradition; the Classic Twin-100, for instance, is a 100-watt two channel amp inspired by the Fender Twin. Effects include a spring reverb unit. His Tremodillo tremolo pedal is highly sought after. In 1992, Cesar performed in and helped to design The Ultimate Guitar tech film. The film was a very well received guitar tech industrial training film, teaching the best way to change and tune strings on the guitar, to fixing tube amplifiers, filmed, produced and edited by Leonard J Eisenberg, the Jimi Hendrix photographer.
