= Testify (Isley Brothers song) =

"Testify (Part I)"

Single by The Isley Brothers
- B-side: "Testify (Part II)"
- Released: June 1964
- Recorded: March 21, 1964
- Studio: Atlantic, New York City
- Genre: Soul
- Length: 2:53
- Label: T-Neck
- Songwriters: Ronald Isley; O'Kelly Isley Jr.; Rudolph Isley
- Producer: The Isley Brothers

The Isley Brothers singles chronology
"Who's That Lady" (1964)	"Testify (Part I)" (1964)	"The Last Girl" (1964)

"Testify" is an uptempo soul song by the American rhythm and blues group the Isley Brothers. Written by the Isleys and recorded in 1964, it followed several successful singles by the group and was the first single to appear on their own T-Neck record label.

Music critic Richie Unterberger describes "Testify" as "a delightful track, one that worked as a both an out-and-out raver and a novelty", praising it as "tremendously exciting uptempo soul music". Jimi Hendrix provided the guitar parts, which Unterberger identifies as one of the best examples of his pre-Experience recordings.

== Lyrics and composition ==
The practice of "testifying" is used in churches in the American South to express belief in Christian faith and experiences. For their song, the Isleys parody the practice:

Brothers and sisters and to all this song may concern, if you want to have some soul, if you want to be a witness I want you to listen while I testify ... All it takes is a rhythm in your feet, don't worry about the music baby, you gotta have a beat, now you got soul"

During the song, others are called upon and testify briefly, including "Raymond, the genius, Ray", "James from Augusta, Georgia", "our friend Stevie", "another friend that lives in Detroit called Jackie", and "across the water ... them cats with long hair". The Isley Brothers respond, imitating the singing styles of Ray Charles, James Brown, Stevie Wonder, Jackie Wilson and the Beatles.

Ronald Isley provides the lead vocals, with Rudolph Isley and O'Kelly Isley Jr. supplying the background vocals. Due to its length of nearly six minutes, "Testify" was split into two parts for release as a single. Although it missed the record charts, it later gained wider exposure as one of the first recordings featuring guitarist Jimi Hendrix.

== Hendrix involvement ==
The Isley Brothers were one of the first groups that Hendrix recorded and toured with after relocating to New York's Harlem neighborhood from Nashville, Tennessee. Hendrix biographer Harry Shapiro describes his guitar parts for the song as "churning, hard-hitting rhythm chords and fluid blues-inspired solo breaks". Unterberger notes Hendrix's "spindly, roving electric guitar" in the opening section, and about ten seconds of "really wild, unhinged R&B soloing" later in the track. In 2010, "Testify" was included on the Hendrix compilation West Coast Seattle Boy: The Jimi Hendrix Anthology, along with several other of his pre-Experience recordings.

American blues guitarist Stevie Ray Vaughan recorded the song for his 1983 debut album Texas Flood. Music writer Brad Tolinski calls it "More a tip of the hat than a cover ... one of Vaughan’s very best performances".
