= Texas Flood =

Studio album by Stevie Ray Vaughan and Double Trouble
- Released: June 13, 1983
- Recorded: November 22–24, 1982
- Studios: Down Town Studio (Los Angeles, California); Riverside Sound (Austin, Texas)
- Genres: Texas blues; electric blues
- Length: 38:48
- Label: Epic
- Producers: Stevie Ray Vaughan and Double Trouble; Richard Mullen

Stevie Ray Vaughan and Double Trouble chronology
Texas Flood (1983)	Couldn't Stand the Weather (1984)

Singles from Texas Flood
- 1. "Love Struck Baby" Released: 1983; 2. "Pride and Joy" Released: 1983

Texas Flood is the debut studio album by the American blues rock band Stevie Ray Vaughan and Double Trouble, released on June 13, 1983, by Epic Records. The album was named after a cover song featured on the album, "Texas Flood", which was first recorded by blues singer Larry Davis in 1958. Produced by the band and recording engineer Richard Mullen, Texas Flood was recorded in the space of three days at Jackson Browne's personal recording studio in Los Angeles. Vaughan wrote six of the album's ten tracks.

Two singles, "Love Struck Baby" and "Pride and Joy", were released from the album. A music video was made for "Love Struck Baby" and received regular rotation on MTV in 1983. Texas Flood was reissued in 1999 with five bonus tracks, including an interview segment, studio outtake, and three live tracks recorded on September 23, 1983, at The Palace in Hollywood, California. The album was reissued again in 2013, with two CDs in celebration of the album's 30th anniversary. Disc 1 is the original album with one bonus track, "Tin Pan Alley". Disc 2 is selections from a previously unreleased concert recorded at Ripley's Music Hall in Philadelphia, Pennsylvania, on October 20, 1983, originally recorded for the King Biscuit Flower Hour radio program.

Texas Flood received positive reviews, with critics praising the deep blues sound, and Vaughan's songwriting, while some criticized the album for straying too far from mainstream rock. A retrospective review by AllMusic awarded it five out of five stars. In 2026, Texas Flood was selected by the Library of Congress for preservation in the National Recording Registry for its "cultural, historical or aesthetic importance in the nation's recorded sound heritage."

== Background ==
Vaughan and Double Trouble had performed at the Montreux Jazz Festival in July 1982 and caught the attention of musician Jackson Browne. He offered the band three days' free use of his Los Angeles recording studio. They accepted the offer and recorded a demo during Thanksgiving weekend in late November. It was heard by record producer John H. Hammond, who had discovered artists such as Aretha Franklin, Bob Dylan, and Bruce Springsteen among many others. He presented the demo to Greg Geller, head of A&R at Epic Records, and arranged a recording contract.

== Recording and production ==
As the first day of production largely involved setting up equipment, Texas Flood was recorded in two days, with no overdubs. In early 1983, subsequent to the band's signing with Epic, they were given an advance of $65,000 to re-master the recordings. The album was mixed and mastered in New York City. The recordings were released as Texas Flood in June 1983.

Bassist Tommy Shannon recalls of the sessions, "It really was just a big warehouse with concrete floors and some rugs thrown down. We just found a little corner, set up in a circle looking at and listening to each other and played like a live band." Vaughan used two Fender Vibroverbs and a 150-watt Dumbleland Special owned by Browne. A combination of these amps marked the first time Vaughan used the Dumbleland Special, which contributed to his trademark sound. Engineer and co-producer Richard Mullen says of his production techniques:

Just one mic on everything. I used two Shure SM57s on his guitar amps—one on a Fender Vibroverb with a 15-inch Altec Lansing speaker, and one on a Dumble 4x12" bottom (with Electro-Voice speakers) connected to a Dumble head. Stevie played through two Vibroverbs, but I only miked one of the speakers in one of them. I positioned the mics about three or four inches off the cabinet at about a 45 degree angle to the cone. The only effect he used was an Ibanez Tube Screamer.

— Richard Mullen,

== Touring ==
Vaughan and Double Trouble toured North America and Europe in June–December 1983 to support Texas Flood. On July 15, 1983, they performed at the Rooftop Skyroom Bar in Buffalo, NY, then July 20 the El Mocambo in Toronto and a film was released in December 1999 by Sony named Live at the El Mocambo on DVD. A performance from Austin City Limits was also released on the video Live from Austin, Texas. On August 22, 1983, the band performed a sold-out concert at The Palace in Hollywood. The show was broadcast on the King Biscuit Flower Hour and three tracks were included on the reissue of Texas Flood. The tour continued on through Europe and the band appeared at the Reading Festival in England. They went back to the United States and opened 17 shows for The Moody Blues.

== Reception ==
Professional ratings
Review scores
Source	Rating
AllMusic	5/5 stars
The Boston Phoenix	2.5/4 stars
Classic Rock	4.5/5 stars
Encyclopedia of Popular Music	4/5 stars
The Great Rock Discography	6/10
MusicHound Blues	3.5/5
The Penguin Guide to Blues Recordings	4/4 stars
Rolling Stone	3/5 stars
The Rolling Stone Album Guide	4/5 stars
The Village Voice	B

Texas Flood was released on June 13, 1983, with two singles released from the album—"Pride and Joy" and "Love Struck Baby". "Pride and Joy" peaked at #20 on the Mainstream Rock Tracks chart. "Texas Flood" was nominated for Best Traditional Blues Performance and "Rude Mood" was nominated for Best Rock Instrumental Performance. The album was mostly well received by critics. A retrospective five-star AllMusic review by Stephen Thomas Erlewine described it as a "monumental impact" and said it "sparked a revitalization of the blues". Despite many positive responses, it also received some negative notices with Rolling Stone criticizing Vaughan for a lack of originality and claiming that he did not possess a distinctive style.

Texas Monthly gave the album a positive review, calling Vaughan "the most exciting guitarist to come out of Texas since Johnny Winter". In a less enthusiastic review for The Village Voice, Robert Christgau felt that the album lacked "momentum and song form", which he averred to be the essence of rock and roll. It was the lack of these characteristics that was, he said, the reason his attention wandered "after the kickoff originals 'Love Struck Baby' and 'Pride and Joy.'" The album peaked at #38 on the Billboard 200 chart immediately after its release. It went platinum in Canada and double-platinum in the United States, selling over 2,000,000 units. On the year-end charts it finished #56 in Canada.

On December 21, 2020, it was announced that the album was a 2021 inductee into the Grammy Hall of Fame in recognition of its historical significance.

== Track listing ==
=== Original release ===
All tracks are written by Stevie Ray Vaughan except where noted.

Side A
No.	Title	Writer(s)	Length
1.	"Love Struck Baby"		2:19
2.	"Pride and Joy"		3:39
3.	"Texas Flood"	Larry Davis, Joseph Wade Scott	5:21
4.	"Tell Me"	Howlin' Wolf	2:48
5.	"Testify"	Ronald Isley, O'Kelly Isley Jr., Rudolph Isley	3:20

Side B
No.	Title	Writer(s)	Length
1.	"Rude Mood"		4:36
2.	"Mary Had a Little Lamb"	Buddy Guy	2:46
3.	"Dirty Pool"	Doyle Bramhall, Vaughan	4:58
4.	"I'm Cryin'"		3:41
5.	"Lenny"		5:00

Note: Many releases of the album erroneously attribute songwriting credits of "Testify" for Parliament members who have written an unrelated song of the same name.

=== 1999 reissue bonus tracks ===
1999 reissue bonus tracks
No.	Title	Writer(s)	Length
11.	"SRV Speaks"		0:37
12.	"Tin Pan Alley (aka Roughest Place in Town)"	Robert Geddins	7:42
13.	"Testify [Live]"	Ronald Isley, O'Kelly Isley Jr., Rudolph Isley	3:54
14.	"Mary Had a Little Lamb [Live]"	Buddy Guy	3:31
15.	"Wham! [Live]"	Lonnie Mack	4:20

"SRV Speaks" is from a studio interview with Timothy White for Westwood One Radio. "Tin Pan Alley" is a studio outtake from the sessions for the album. The remaining bonus tracks are all from recordings for the Superstar Concert Series radio broadcast.

=== 2013 reissue ===
Disc one
No.	Title	Writer(s)	Length
1.	"Love Struck Baby"		2:23
2.	"Pride and Joy"		3:40
3.	"Texas Flood"	L.C. Davis, J.W. Scott	5:21
4.	"Tell Me"	C.A. Burnett	2:48
5.	"Testify"	The Isley Brothers	3:22
6.	"Rude Mood"		4:40
7.	"Mary Had a Little Lamb"	Buddy Guy	2:47
8.	"Dirty Pool"		5:02
9.	"I'm Cryin'"		3:47
10.	"Lenny"		5:02
11.	"Tin Pan Alley (a.k.a. Roughest Place in Town)"	R.L. Geddins	7:37

=== Disc 2: Live at Ripley's Music Hall in Philadelphia, PA (October 20, 1983) ===
1. "Testify" – 4:14
2. "So Excited" – 4:17
3. "Voodoo Child (Slight Return)" – 7:44
4. "Pride and Joy" – 4:57
5. "Texas Flood" – 10:00
6. "Love Struck Baby" – 3:08
7. "Mary Had a Little Lamb" – 2:59
8. "Tin Pan Alley (aka Roughest Place in Town)" – 8:14
9. "Little Wing/Third Stone from the Sun" – 12:28

== Personnel ==
- Stevie Ray Vaughan – guitar, vocals

Double Trouble

- Tommy Shannon – bass guitar
- Chris "Whipper" Layton – drums

Production

- Produced by Stevie Ray Vaughan, Richard Mullen, Tommy Shannon, and Chris Layton
- Executive producer – John H. Hammond
- Production assistant – Mikie Harris
- Engineered by Richard Mullen, assisted by James Geddes; Vocals on "I'm Cryin'" recorded by Lincoln Clapp
- Mixed by Lincoln Clapp, assisted by Don Wershba and Harry Spiridakis
- Mastered by Ken Robertson
- Cover art by Brad Holland
- Tray card photo by Don Hunstein
- Art direction by John Berg and Allen Weinberg

1999 reissue

- Executive producer – Tony Martell
- Produced by Bob Irwin
- Mastered by Vic Anesini
- Track 12 mixed by Danny Kadar
- Dialogue edited by Darcy Proper
- Research assistance by George Deahl, Al Quaglieri, Matthew Kelly, and Jon Naatjes
- Art direction by Josh Cheuse
- Editorial direction by Andy Schwartz
- Liner notes by Michael Ventura

== Charts ==
1983–1985 chart performance for Texas Flood
Chart (1983–1985)	Peak position
Australian Albums (Kent Music Report)	46
Canada Top Albums/CDs (RPM)	15
Finnish Albums (The Official Finnish Charts)	22
New Zealand Albums (RMNZ)	16
US Billboard 200	38

2013 weekly chart performance for Texas Flood
Chart (2013)	Peak position
Belgian Albums (Ultratop Flanders)	189
Belgian Albums (Ultratop Wallonia)	116

2025–2026 weekly chart performance for Texas Flood
Chart (2025–2026)	Peak position
US Top Blues Albums (Billboard)	2

== Certifications ==
Certifications for Texas Flood
Region	Certification	Certified units/sales
Canada (Music Canada)	Platinum	100,000^{^}
France (SNEP)	Gold	100,000^{*}
New Zealand (RMNZ)	Gold	7,500^{^}
United Kingdom (BPI) 1999 release	Gold	100,000^{‡}
United States (RIAA)	2× Platinum	2,000,000^{^}
^{*} Sales figures based on certification alone.^{^} Shipments figures based on certification alone.^{‡} Sales+streaming figures based on certification alone.

== Release history ==
Release history and formats for Texas Flood
Region	Year	Label	Format	Catalog
United States	1983	Epic	LP	38734
United States	1990	Epic	CD	38734
United States	1999	Epic/Legacy	CD	65870
Japan	2005	Sony Music Entertainment	CD	636
