= Rude Mood =

Song by Stevie Ray Vaughan and Double Trouble

from the album Texas Flood
- Released: June 13, 1983
- Recorded: November 24, 1982
- Genre: Electric blues Blues rock
- Length: 4:40
- Label: Epic Records
- Songwriter(s): Stevie Ray Vaughan

"Rude Mood" is the sixth track on Stevie Ray Vaughan's debut album, Texas Flood. It is an instrumental blues shuffle in 4/4 (common time) and played at 264 beats per minute.

The song was nominated for the Grammy Award for Best Rock Instrumental Performance in 1984, losing to Sting's "Brimstone and Treacle".

== Origin and structure ==
"Rude Mood" is a take on a Lightnin' Hopkins song called "Hopkins' Sky Hop". Vaughan's recorded live performances of the song include Live at Carnegie Hall and the DVD Live at Montreux 1982. He occasionally played the song on acoustic guitar instead of his characteristic Stratocaster, sometimes taking it faster or slower than the studio version.

The song starts out with the main riff introduced by the guitar; the bass notes are played quickly with muted notes in between, resulting in a swung feel. The bass guitar and drums are introduced after the introduction, establishing the beat that continues to the end.
