= Family Style (Vaughan Brothers album) =

Studio album by the Vaughan Brothers
- Released: September 25, 1990
- Recorded: 1990
- Studios: Ardent Studios, Memphis Tennessee; The Dallas Sound Lab, Dallas Texas and Skyline Studios, New York City
- Genres: Rock, blues rock
- Length: 40:47
- Label: Epic
- Producer: Nile Rodgers

Professional ratings
Review scores
Source	Rating
AllMusic	3/5 stars
The Penguin Guide to Blues Recordings	2/4 stars

Family Style is the only studio album featuring guitarists and vocalists Jimmie and Stevie Ray Vaughan (credited as the Vaughan Brothers). It was released on September 25, 1990.

Stevie Ray often remarked that he would like to do an album with his elder brother; this album was released posthumously a month after his death. The liner notes end with "Thanks Mama V. for letting us play."

The album received mixed reviews. Critics praised the songwriting of both brothers, and highlighted songs such as "D/FW", "Tick Tock", and "Telephone Song", while some criticized the lack of their own personal styles, and the songs straying too far from traditional blues. The album peaked at number seven on the Billboard 200 Albums chart.

== Track listing ==
No.	Title	Writer(s)	Lead vocals	Length
1.	"Hard to Be""	Stevie Ray Vaughan, Doyle Bramhall	Stevie Ray Vaughan, Jimmie Vaughan	4:43
2.	"White Boots"	Billy Swan, Jim Leslie, Deborah Hutchenson	Stevie Ray Vaughan	3:50
3.	"D/FW"	Jimmie Vaughan	Instrumental; spoken word intro by Nile Rodgers	2:52
4.	"Good Texan"	J. Vaughan, Nile Rodgers	Jimmie Vaughan	4:22
5.	"Hillbillies from Outerspace"	J. Vaughan, S. R. Vaughan	Instrumental; spoken word outro by Rodgers	3:42
6.	"Long Way from Home"	S. R. Vaughan, Bramhall	Stevie Ray Vaughan	3:15
7.	"Tick Tock"	J. Vaughan, Rodgers, Jerry Lynn Williams	Stevie Ray Vaughan	4:57
8.	"Telephone Song"	S. R. Vaughan, Bramhall	Stevie Ray Vaughan	3:28
9.	"Baboom/Mama Said"	J. Vaughan, S. R. Vaughan, Denny Freeman	Stevie Ray Vaughan, Jimmie Vaughan	4:29
10.	"Brothers"	J. Vaughan, S. R. Vaughan	Instrumental w/ spoken word	5:05

== Personnel ==
- Jimmie Vaughan – guitar, lap steel guitar, vocals, organ
- Stevie Ray Vaughan – guitar, vocals
- Al Berry – bass
- Larry Aberman – drums
- Doyle Bramhall – drums
- Nile Rodgers – guitar, producer
- Richard Hilton – organ
- Tawatha Agee – vocals
- Frank Simms – vocals
- George Simms – vocals
- Brenda White-King – vocals
- Curtis King Jr. – vocals
- Preston Hubbard – upright bass
- Stan Harrison – tenor saxophone

== Charts ==
Chart (1990–1991)	Peak position
Australian Albums (ARIA)	17
Canada Top Albums/CDs (RPM)	6
Dutch Albums (Album Top 100)	53
Finnish Albums (The Official Finnish Charts)	9
New Zealand Albums (RMNZ)	16
Norwegian Albums (VG-lista)	16
Swedish Albums (Sverigetopplistan)	20
Swiss Albums (Schweizer Hitparade)	24
UK Albums (Official Charts)	63
US Billboard 200	7

== Certifications ==
Region	Certification	Certified units/sales
Canada (Music Canada)	Platinum	100,000^{^}
United States (RIAA)	Platinum	1,000,000^{^}
^{^} Shipments figures based on certification alone.
