= Pride and Joy (Stevie Ray Vaughan song) =

1983 single by Stevie Ray Vaughan and Double Trouble

Single by Stevie Ray Vaughan and Double Trouble

from the album Texas Flood
- B-side: "Rude Mood"
- Released: June 13, 1983 (album)
- Recorded: November 24, 1982
- Studio: Down Town Studio (Los Angeles, California)
- Genre: Electric blues; blues rock
- Length: 3:41
- Label: Epic
- Songwriter: Stevie Ray Vaughan
- Producers: Stevie Ray Vaughan, Richard Mullen, and Double Trouble

Stevie Ray Vaughan and Double Trouble singles chronology
"Pride and Joy" (1983)	"Couldn't Stand the Weather" (1984)

Audio
- "Pride and Joy on YouTube

"Pride and Joy" is a song by American singer, guitarist and songwriter Stevie Ray Vaughan and his backing band Double Trouble, released in late 1983 by Epic Records.The song was released on Stevie's debut studio album Texas Flood (1983). "Pride and Joy" was released as Vaughan's debut single and has become one of his most popular songs.

== Lyrics ==
"Pride and Joy" was a feature of Vaughan's live repertoire before he recorded it. According to Double Trouble drummer Chris Layton, Vaughan wrote it for a new girlfriend at the time; somewhat ironically, a later fight with her inspired "I'm Crying".

== Composition ==
Called "a classic Texas shuffle", it has a twelve-bar blues arrangement, notated in the key of E (although with Vaughan's guitar tuned one-half step lower, resulting in the pitch of E♭) in 4/4 time with a moderately fast tempo. The main guitar figure features a bassline along with muted chord chops to produce a percussive-like effect. Vaughan also "extracts extra sound from the guitar by choosing finger shapes that allow the maximum number of strings to ring at a time (often the top E-string [E♭])".

== Personnel ==
Credits and personnel are adapted from Texas Flood album liner notes.

Double Trouble

- Stevie Ray Vaughan – guitar, vocals
- Tommy Shannon – bass
- Chris Layton – drums

Production

- Stevie Ray Vaughan – writer, producer
- Tommy Shannon – producer
- Chris Layton – producer
- Richard Mullen – producer, recording
- James Geddes – assistant engineer
- Lincoln Clapp – mixing
- Don Wershba – mixing assistant
- Harry Spiridakis – mixing assistant
- Ken Robertson – mastering

== Chart performance ==
The song was released as a single and reached #20 on Mainstream Rock.

== Certifications ==
Certifications for "Pride and Joy"
Region	Certification	Certified units/sales
New Zealand (RMNZ)	Platinum	30,000^{‡}
^{‡} Sales+streaming figures based on certification alone.
