= Texas Flood Tour =

1983–84 concert tour

- Global tour by Stevie Ray Vaughan and Double Trouble
- Poster for a concert in Dallas
- Location: Europe; North America
- Associated album: Texas Flood
- Start date: June 22, 1983
- End date: February 25, 1984
- Legs: 5
- No. of shows: 115

Stevie Ray Vaughan and Double Trouble concert chronology
- Texas Flood Tour (1983–84); Couldn't Stand the Weather Tour (1984–85)

The Texas Flood World Tour was a concert tour in North America and Western Europe, undertaken by American blues rock band Stevie Ray Vaughan and Double Trouble in 1983 and 1984. The band had released their debut album, Texas Flood, a week before the tour began.

The first leg of the tour took the band through the United States and Canada, and then on to Europe where they toured for two weeks. They then returned to North America where, during a leg that lasted more than three months, Vaughan and Double Trouble opened for Men at Work and The Moody Blues. The tour concluded in the Mid-Atlantic. The band returned to the studio in January 1984. The tour resumed the following month. The final leg incorporated return stops to several cities, and a visit to Hawaii, before the band returned home in late February.

The tour provided the band with widespread exposure and was a commercial success. Vaughan continued to tour in the ensuing seven years before his death in a helicopter crash in August 1990.

== Background ==
Vaughan was one of two children born to Jimmie Lee "Big Jim" and Martha Jean Vaughan. His brother Jimmie Lawrence Vaughan was born March 20, 1951; Stevie (Stephen Ray Vaughan) was born on October 3, 1954, in Dallas. His brother began to teach himself to play the guitar when he was twelve. Vaughan observed him intently, and his musical education was aided by exposure to his brother's constant practicing and playing. According to Vaughan, "he made up three songs the first day. He didn't have to try. It just came out". Steve Stevenson, a family friend, noticed that within a few days Jimmie was able to demonstrate what he had learned.

Vaughan was playing the guitar by the time he was seventeen. In that year, 1972, he brought his band Blackbird to Austin to play at the Rolling Hills Country Club, and later at the Soap Creek Saloon. Vaughan then joined a band called Krackerjack for a three-month stint. He had accepted offers from several local bands, but within six years of arriving in Austin, Vaughan and his own group, Double Trouble, were playing at the Rome Inn. Among those present was Manor Downs accountant, and future business partner, Edi Johnson who remembered, "I'm not an authority on music—it's whatever turned me on—but this did". After an appearance before record producer Jerry Wexler, Vaughan and Double Trouble were invited to the Montreux Jazz Festival in 1982. The audience disliked the band's music and booed their performance. Vaughan and Double Trouble met Jackson Browne the following night. He offered them free use of his personal studio in Los Angeles where they recorded a full-length album in November 1982.

As the band gave several performances toward year's end, they began to be noticed by music industry representatives. At the end of a two-night stand in Austin, Vaughan and Double Trouble earned more than $7,000 for their efforts. The group signed with Epic Records. The label's approval encouraged Vaughan to pursue further opportunities. On a trip to New York, Vaughan and Double Trouble were the opening act at a Bryan Adams concert.

== Tour itinerary ==
=== Preparations ===
In a memorandum to executives at the southwest branch of Epic written before the tour, marketing Vice President Jack Chase agreed to break Vaughan and Double Trouble out of Texas. After a branch meeting he said: "The prize is having Stevie Ray Vaughn [sic] on our label and in your bags to promote and sell". Chase said it was his duty to break Vaughan nationally, otherwise "the pride in selling a 'Men at Work' is long gone". He went on to describe Vaughan as a "remarkable artist". Author Craig Hopkins has suggested that the success of Texas Flood was largely dependent on Chase's expertise in breaking a new artist: "John Hammond has received the most accolades [for the album's success], but without Jack Chase, the record might have been just another of those grapes withering on the vine", according to Hopkins. However, there is no evidence to suggest that Hammond was less involved in the making of the band's subsequent studio albums; it seems that he trusted Vaughan's abilities as an artist.

Chase wanted Vaughan and the band to begin touring as soon as possible—the longer the album took to breakout, the more competition it would face. The itinerary he initially planned included the Eastern and Southwestern United States. The additional legs were only added after the growing international success of Texas Flood. The plan was for the band to begin the tour performing nationwide then tour Western Europe. They would headline theater dates in Texas playing for their immediate statewide fan base. Agents Rick Alter and Alex Hodges provided marketing assistance. Their philosophies and techniques in the major markets led to the band eventually performing arena tours, which enabled them to earn bonuses for reaching specific ticket sales plateaus.

Vaughan and Double Trouble prepared for the tour by performing showcases in Dallas and Houston. These were attended by various musicians, radio station personalities, disc jockeys, record store owners, music critics, and record company executives. The band also made promotional appearances. On tour, even during the busiest traveling days, they would fit these into their daily schedule. The band would later find them exhausting. Before the tour could begin, Vaughan and Double Trouble needed the support of radio stations, Dallas' Q102-FM in particular. At first disc jockey Redbeard received only negative reactions from listeners when he played the album. Nevertheless, he persevered and played Texas Flood for an additional two weeks leading to more album sales in the Southwest. At least 15,000 units were shipped to record stores.

=== Opening leg (June–August 1983) ===
The tour began on June 22, 1983. On the second night Vaughan developed laryngitis, requiring the cancellation of three performances. He used this time to rest his throat. In Philadelphia, on July 8, the band played at Ripley Music Hall and recorded the show for a radio show broadcast. The next stop was Providence, where they appeared before a capacity audience. The group moved on to New York, where they performed for another packed house in Rochester.

The next extended stop was in Canada. Vaughan and Double Trouble played four concerts including a July 20 appearance at the El Mocambo in Toronto. From there the band took their newly purchased tour bus back to New York, where they played additional concerts. One of the concerts was organized by tennis players Vitas Gerulaitis and John McEnroe as a benefit for the Special Olympics. A review of the concert described it as "one of the lightest turnouts of the season", adding that Gerulaitis and McEnroe "still cannot lure hordes of teenagers to a concert, even a benefit for a worthy cause". However, the review praised the band: "The concert opened strongly with the ubiquitous Texas guitarist Stevie Ray Vaughan leading his trio Double Trouble through a workmanlike set of blues and boogie-woogie."

The group proceeded to the Northeast, Mid-Atlantic, Midwest and East South Central regions of the US. Returning to Canada, they reached Montreal, where they performed before over 38,000 people, at the Olympic Stadium. The concert also featured The Police, Talking Heads and Peter Tosh, earning nearly $700,000 in gross revenue. The band proceeded through the west and Midwestern U.S., an area that encompassed Michigan, Illinois, Colorado and California, arriving in Grand Rapids, on August 11. After two performances at ChicagoFest with opening act Buddy Guy and Junior Wells, ("I'll open for them", Vaughan told his agent Rick Alter), Vaughan and Double Trouble gave a performance as the warm-up for Sammy Hagar on August 19. In late August the band departed for England.

=== Europe (August–September 1983) ===
On August 27, 1983, Vaughan and Double Trouble arrived in England. The band hoped for a positive reception from the crowd at the Reading Rock Festival in the county of Berkshire. However, in a lineup with mainly hard rock and heavy metal artists, Vaughan and the band stood out and were not received well by the audience, some of whom began throwing bottles of urine. One person who took particular note of this was the band's road crew member Byron Barr, whose journal records the reaction in demeaning terms: "Played Reading Festival. People were rude bastards. They threw bottles full of piss & all kinds of rude shit." Uber Rock writer Andy P's own recollection, written in 2014, was similar: "He kinda stuck out a bit like a sore thumb and like Steel Pulse the day before he caught the attention of the bottle throwers. Unlike Steel Pulse who ended their set early with bottles clanging off their steel drums he persisted with real flair asking the crowd politely, 'I know it's fun but put a stop to it'."

On August 31 the band traveled to Paris for two shows. There they received their first gold records from the Canadian Recording Industry Association (CRIA) for selling 50,000 copies of Texas Flood. In Paris they also visited the famous Eiffel Tower, then the Arc de Triomphe—"...where Hitler marched through on horseback. Pretty scary to think that all that shit happened just 40 years or so ago", wrote Barr in his journal. A further concert was played in Berlin on September 4 at a nightclub in the borough of Kreuzberg. The next day Vaughan and Double Trouble's first German television appearance was broadcast—a brief interview with Vaughan and a performance of four songs from Texas Flood. The interview featured a male and female host. The male host asked questions in English, and the female host translated Vaughan's responses into German. Hopkins comments that the female host came out wearing Vaughan's trademark flat-brim hat, which he did not appear to find humorous. On September 8 the band arrived in London.

Vaughan and Double Trouble's first London show was at The Venue on Victoria Street. They were advertised as a "special guest at the Reading Rock Festival" with their "new album Texas Flood". The group's London performance proved successful; according to The Guardian, Vaughan's "technique and command are something quite extraordinary". This was, as former bandmate Billy Alford put it, "just a major drug fest". Referring to Vaughan's escalating substance abuse, Alford said, "I knew he was going to be a star, that he had it. It was just a matter of timing and whether he would kill himself before he got there." The final European concert was performed on September 9 at the Paradiso in Amsterdam. The band then returned to the U.S. for a tour of the East Coast.

=== North America (September–December 1983) ===
On September 14 Vaughan and Double Trouble arrived in Norfolk, where they played at The Boathouse; a few days later they played an awards show held by WSHE in Miami. The band's agent Rick Alter was sufficiently confident of their career status to announce the group's appearance at concerts at Houston Music Hall, Austin City Coliseum and the Bronco Bowl in Dallas in early October. An advertisement for the Dallas concert included the phrase "the triumphant return of Stevie Ray Vaughan and Double Trouble". The main reason for their return to Texas was to play celebratory homecoming concerts for Vaughan's immediate fan base in the state. He had performed extensively on the Texas club circuit for nearly a decade. Vaughan featured guitarist Eric Johnson as the warm-up act for each show.

Manager Chesley Millikin had been effusive with his praise in a letter to Epic's Jack Chase, dated October 12. He wrote that the band would not have had the chance to breakout nationally without the benefit of Epic's marketing efforts. He confirmed that Vaughan and Double Trouble would soon return to the studio, and learned that Texas Flood was approaching sales of 300,000 units. According to Alex Hodges, one of the band's agents, many people disliked the idea of them performing in an upcoming tour with The Moody Blues. He reckoned that both bands had a common thread in musical genre, however, and accordingly organized concerts for October through December, which were deemed a success. Hodges apparently "didn't have any doubt" in Vaughan's ability to command the audience. During a short hiatus in mid-December, the band turned their attention briefly from performing to composing. Among other compositions, they finished two instrumentals, which were incorporated into the closing shows of the year, which they completed during a return appearance in Norfolk.

=== United States (February 1984) ===
The band traveled to New York City for two and a half weeks. The band played no concerts during this period although there were recording sessions scheduled at the Power Station with John Hammond. Drummer Chris Layton was effusive about Hammond's presence during the sessions; Hammond, he said, "was kind of like a nice hand on your shoulder", and: "he was a feedback person". Layton called him "our gyroscope", and praised his keen ability to identify keeper takes and eliminate over processing.

The recordings made by Vaughan and Double Trouble during these sessions were released as Couldn't Stand the Weather, the band's second studio album. On February 4, the band left New York for Nashville. They played a concert there at the Nashville Municipal Auditorium, appearing at the tenth-annual Volunteer Jam, an event organized by Charlie Daniels. They moved on to Knoxville where they performed at Alumni Memorial Gym on the University of Tennessee campus. The band traveled to Georgia, arriving in Atlanta on February 8, where they did two shows at the Moonshadow Saloon. During the first performance, Vaughan paused during their set and asked an unruly patron to leave the venue, one of the few times he called out a disruptive patron.

The tour through the Midwest continued, with concerts in Missouri and Illinois. Less than a week after the band left Chicago, a 28-year-old man named Willie M. "Wimp" Stokes, Jr., the son of a drug kingpin, was shot and killed at a motel there. Austin musician Bill Carter read about the incident in a local newspaper and wrote the song "Willie the Wimp". He recorded a demo of the song that he gave to Vaughan, who later included his version on the band's live album, Live Alive. Resuming the tour, the band reached Honolulu on February 25 where they closed the tour as the warm-up for The Police at Aloha Stadium.

== Reception ==
=== Commercial ===
The band had survived a few setbacks, including three canceled shows which were rescheduled due to Vaughan's laryngitis. The full extent of the tour's earnings and expenses was not highly publicized. Hopkins confirms the band had averaged $500 to $950 per show before the release of Texas Flood, but this had grown to $1,500 by the beginning of the tour. After four months on the road, during the Moody Blues tour in October–December 1983, the band received $5,000 per show, an amount that included additional bonuses dependent on ticket sale plateaus. Layton stated that, "I could actually pay my rent and keep my lights turned on and have money to eat on and put gas in my car—that was our real priority in life." He later recounted that the year before they had "very little money" and were "basically broke".

At times, the shows were packed to capacity; in August 1983, near the end of the first North American excursion, the group's performance at The Palace in Los Angeles was a sellout. "As we were pulling up to the club, there was a line all the way around the block," recalled Shannon. Two months later, after their success in Europe, Vaughan and Double Trouble received a portion of the near $75,000 in ticket sale revenue, following an appearance opening for Men at Work in Seattle. However, in December of that year, after the Moody Blues tour concluded, they returned to performing in smaller theaters—they sold out the Beacon Theatre on December 28. The following year, after studio duties were completed, Vaughan and Double Trouble earned a percentage of the near $155,000 gross revenue after their performance in Nashville. The stability of the band's career meant they could enjoy making their living by playing music.

=== Critical response and creative development ===
In terms of critical reception, while there were some mixed reactions, Vaughan and Double Trouble were generally well received. The band was now known throughout the United States, Canada and Europe. As well as encounters with other musical celebrities, the group now had the ability to share the stage with their musical influences; the tour represented, for them, an indicator of success. However, these advantages had been gained at a price; Shannon, in retrospect, noted the stress and strain on the band. They had succumbed to "everything you'd want, [which was] right there—and for a long time it was fun". However, Vaughan's friend Lew Stokes, while also expressing concerns, concludes that, despite Vaughan's substance abuse, his moral compass remained, and the way he treated people had never wavered. The tour confirmed Vaughan's mastery of the electric guitar. This was evidenced in his hometown, on June 16, when a number of radio VIPs attended the Texas Flood record release party. They were frankly skeptical about Vaughan's performance skills, believing them to be feasible only in the studio.

Four songs Vaughan and Double Trouble composed at the end of 1983 were included on their next album, Couldn't Stand the Weather. A number of songs were outtakes, including an instrumental and a lyrical piece. The released works include two instrumentals "Scuttle Buttin'" and "Stang's Swang", and two lyrical pieces "Couldn't Stand the Weather" and "Honey Bee". Vaughan's creative progress is reflected in the songs released on Couldn't Stand the Weather, which, according to Hopkins, quickly outpaced the sales of Texas Flood. The album includes Vaughan's first attempt at instrumental jazz, "Stang's Swang".

== Aftermath ==
Despite his earnings from the tour, Vaughan and his wife Lenny continued to live in their modest house in Austin. However, travel and public appearances dominated the next two years of Vaughan's life. In March 1984 the band was on tour again, this time around North America, Europe, Australasia and Japan, remaining on the road until May 1985. In June Vaughan and Double Trouble left for another tour—with Reese Wynans who was now the band's keyboardist. They were away for over ten months, and took a break in May 1986, to change their management team. A second visit to Europe, from September until October 1986, was the last of the exhaustive touring schedule. Vaughan's new personal assistant, Timothy Duckworth, had concerns about his escalating substance abuse. This ultimately threatened Vaughan's life—and now threatened Shannon's, who was also immersed by addiction.

== Set list ==
1. "Testify" (The Isley Brothers cover)
2. "So Excited"
3. "Voodoo Child (Slight Return)" (The Jimi Hendrix Experience cover)
4. "Pride and Joy"
5. "The Things (That) I Used to Do" (Guitar Slim cover) or "Tin Pan Alley" (Bob Geddins cover)
6. "Mary Had a Little Lamb" (Buddy Guy cover)
7. "Love Struck Baby"
8. "Texas Flood" (Larry Davis cover)
9. "Tell Me" (Howlin' Wolf cover)
10. "Little Wing" (The Jimi Hendrix Experience cover)
11. "Third Stone From the Sun" (The Jimi Hendrix Experience cover)

Encore:

12. "Lenny"
13. "Rude Mood"
14. "Testify" (Reprise) or "Wham!" (Lonnie Mack cover) or "Manic Depression" (The Jimi Hendrix Experience cover)

== Tour dates ==
List of concert dates, cities, states, venues, and opening act(s)
Date	City	Country	Venue / Event	Opening Act(s)
North America
June 22, 1983	Bloomington	United States	Jake's	The Morells
June 23, 1983	Cleveland	United States	Pirate's Cove	Ray Fuller and the Bluesrockers
June 28, 1983	Cincinnati	United States	Bogart's	Ray Fuller and the Bluesrockers
June 29, 1983	St. Louis	United States	Mississippi Nights	
July 1, 1983	Milwaukee	United States	Summerfest Grounds	Short Stuff, Truc
July 2, 1983	Quincy	United States	Quinsippi Island	100 Proof
July 3, 1983	Chicago	United States	Metro Chicago	George Faber and Stronghold
July 6, 1983	Asbury Park	United States	Asbury Park Convention Hall	
July 7, 1983	New York City	United States	First City Cabaret	Eve Moon
July 8, 1983	Philadelphia	United States	Ripley Music Hall	
July 9, 1983	Providence	United States	Lupo's Heartbreak Hotel	
July 10, 1983	Boston	United States	Paradise Theatre	The Lost Tropics
July 12, 1983	Poughkeepsie	United States	The Chance	The Lost Tropics
July 13, 1983	Auburn	United States	Schines Auburn Theatre	
July 14, 1983	Rochester	United States	Red Creek Inn	
July 15, 1983	Buffalo	United States	Rooftop Skyroom	Vincent Michaels Band
July 16, 1983	Toronto	Canada	CNE Bandshell	
July 18, 1983	Montreal	Canada	Montreal Spectrum	
July 19, 1983	Ottawa	Canada	Barrymore's	
July 20, 1983	Toronto	Canada	El Mocambo	
July 22, 1983	Rome	United States	Colmans	The Lost Tropics
July 23, 1983	New York City	United States	Pier 84	
July 24, 1983	Scotia	United States	Radio City	
July 25, 1983	New Haven	United States	Toad's Place	Current
July 27, 1983	Washington, D.C.	United States	The Bayou	Bob Margolin
July 28, 1983	Pittsburgh	United States	The Decade	Loan Sharks
July 30, 1983	Detroit	United States	Saint Andrew's Hall	Street Light Knights
July 31, 1983	Dayton	United States	Gilly's	
August 1, 1983	Louisville	United States	Stage II	Lonnie Mack
August 3, 1983	Montreal	Canada	Montreal Olympic Stadium	
August 11, 1983	Lowell	United States	Lowell Showboat Amphitheater	
August 12, 1983	Chicago	United States	Soldier Field	Vanessa Davis Band Eddie Taylor
August 13, 1983	Chicago	United States	Soldier Field	Buddy Guy and Jr. Wells, Clark Street
August 15, 1983	Colorado Springs	United States	Rose's	Dave Drynan, Red Perry and Walter Chase
August 16, 1983	Denver	United States	Rainbow Music Hall	
August 19, 1983	Sacramento	United States	Cal Expo	Y&T
August 19, 1983	Berkeley	United States	Keystone	Fabulous Pork Swords Mitch Woods and His Rocket 88's
August 20, 1983	San Francisco	United States	The Stone	The Uptones Northern Rockers
August 21, 1983	Palo Alto	United States	Keystone	Expresso, Star Lamone and the Deltoids
August 22, 1983	Los Angeles	United States	The Palace	Hodge Brothers Band
August 23, 1983	Huntington Beach	United States	Golden Bear	
Europe
August 27, 1983	Reading	England	Reading Festival	
September 1, 1983	Paris	France	Rock and Roll Circus	
September 2, 1983	Paris	France	Rock and Roll Circus	
September 4, 1983	West Berlin	West Germany	Sektor	
September 7, 1983	Hamburg	West Germany	Fabrik	
September 8, 1983	London	England	The Venue	
September 9, 1983	Amsterdam	Netherlands	Paradiso	Harry Muskee
North America
September 14, 1983	Norfolk	United States	The Boathouse	Skip Castro Band
September 15, 1983	Richmond	United States	Much More	Johnny Sportcoat and the Casuals
September 16, 1983	York	United States	York Fairgrounds	
September 17, 1983	Benson	United States	Scott Lake Pavilion	The Spongetones Control Group
September 20, 1983	Charlotte	United States	P.B. Scott's Music Hall	Reverend Billy C. Wirtz
September 21, 1983	Stone Mountain	United States	Harlow's	The Heartfixers The Road Ducks
September 22, 1983	Jacksonville	United States	Playground South	The Road Ducks
September 23, 1983	Miami	United States	James L. Knight Convention Center	Mitch Ryder
September 25, 1983	Cocoa Beach	United States	Brassy's Night Club	The Road Ducks
September 26, 1983	Orlando	United States	Tom's Point After	The Road Ducks
September 27, 1983	Sarasota	United States	Playground South	The Road Ducks
September 28, 1983	Clearwater	United States	Mr. T's Club 19	The Road Ducks
September 30, 1983	Gainesville	United States	University of Florida Bandshell	Artimus Pyle Band
October 1, 1983	Destin	United States	Nightown	The Road Ducks
October 2, 1983	New Orleans	United States	McAlister Auditorium	G.T. and the Trustees
October 6, 1983	Houston	United States	Houston Music Hall	Eric Johnson
October 7, 1983	Austin	United States	Austin City Coliseum	Eric Johnson
October 8, 1983	Dallas	United States	Bronco Bowl	Eric Johnson
October 11, 1983	Portland	United States	Portland Memorial Coliseum	Opening act for: Men at Work
October 12, 1983	Seattle	United States	Seattle Center Arena	Opening act for: Men at Work
October 13, 1983	Vancouver	Canada	Pacific Coliseum	Opening act for: Men at Work
October 15, 1983	Edmonton	Canada	Northlands Coliseum	Opening act for: Men at Work
October 17, 1983	Hartford	United States	Hartford Civic Center	Opening act for: The Moody Blues
October 18, 1983	Worcester	United States	Centrum in Worcester	Opening act for: The Moody Blues
October 19, 1983	Buffalo	United States	Buffalo Memorial Auditorium	Opening act for: The Moody Blues
October 21, 1983	Philadelphia	United States	Philadelphia Spectrum	Opening act for: The Moody Blues
October 22, 1983	East Rutherford	United States	Brendan Byrne Arena	Opening act for: The Moody Blues
October 23, 1983	Portland	United States	Cumberland County Civic Center	Opening act for: The Moody Blues
October 25, 1983	Baltimore	United States	Baltimore Civic Center	Opening act for: The Moody Blues
October 26, 1983	Pittsburgh	United States	Pittsburgh Civic Arena	Opening act for: The Moody Blues
October 28, 1983	Cincinnati	United States	Riverfront Coliseum	Opening act for: The Moody Blues
October 29, 1983	Ann Arbor	United States	Crisler Arena	Opening act for: The Moody Blues
October 30, 1983	Rockford	United States	Rockford MetroCentre	Opening act for: The Moody Blues
October 31, 1983	Saint Paul	United States	St. Paul Civic Center	Opening act for: The Moody Blues
November 1, 1983	Cedar Rapids	United States	Five Seasons Center	Opening act for: The Moody Blues
November 2, 1983	Omaha	United States	Omaha Civic Auditorium Arena	Opening act for: The Moody Blues
November 4, 1983	Dallas	United States	Reunion Arena	Opening act for: The Moody Blues
November 6, 1983	Austin	United States	Frank Erwin Center	Opening act for: The Moody Blues
November 7, 1983	Houston	United States	The Summit	Opening act for: The Moody Blues
November 20, 1983	Seattle	United States	Seattle Center Coliseum	Opening act for: The Moody Blues
November 21, 1983	Portland	United States	Veterans Memorial Coliseum	Opening act for: The Moody Blues
November 22, 1983	Vancouver	Canada	Pacific Coliseum	Opening act for: The Moody Blues
November 24, 1983	Edmonton	Canada	Northlands Coliseum	Opening act for: The Moody Blues
November 25, 1983	Calgary	Canada	Olympic Saddledome	Opening act for: The Moody Blues
November 28, 1983	Denver	United States	McNichols Sports Arena	Opening act for: The Moody Blues
November 30, 1983	Tempe	United States	ASU Activity Center	Opening act for: The Moody Blues
December 1, 1983	San Diego	United States	Montezuma Hall	The Paladins
December 2, 1983	Santa Barbara	United States	Campbell Hall	
December 3, 1983	Inglewood	United States	Inglewood Forum	Opening act for: The Moody Blues
December 4, 1983	San Francisco	United States	Kabuki Nightclub	Ron Thompson and the Resistors Pamela Rose and Wild Kingdom
North America
December 27, 1983	Washington, D.C.	United States	Wax Museum Nightclub	Bob Margolin
December 28, 1983	New York City	United States	Beacon Theatre	The Outlaws The Nighthawks
December 29, 1983	Upper Darby Township	United States	Tower Theater	The Outlaws
December 30, 1983	Baltimore	United States	Famous Ballroom	Skip Castro Band
December 31, 1983	Norfolk	United States	The Boathouse	
North America
February 4, 1984	Nashville	United States	Nashville Municipal Auditorium	Grinderswitch Rodney Crowell
February 5, 1984	Knoxville	United States	Alumni Memorial Gym	The Heartfixers
February 7, 1984	Charlotte	United States	P.B. Scott's Music Hall	Robert Cray Band
February 8, 1984	Atlanta	United States	Moonshadow Saloon	The XL's
February 10, 1984	Athens	United States	Tate Student Center	The Heartfixers
February 11, 1984	Carbondale	United States	Shryock Auditorium	Mike Jordan and the Rockamatics
February 12, 1984	Kansas City	United States	Uptown Theater	The Bel Airs
February 15, 1984	Normal	United States	Braden Auditorium	
February 16, 1984	Peoria	United States	Second Chance	Deluxury
February 17, 1984	Chicago	United States	Embassy Ballroom	
February 18, 1984	Chicago	United States	Ida Noyes Hall	Duke Tumatoe and the Power Trio
February 25, 1984	Honolulu	United States	Aloha Stadium	Opening act for: The Police

== See also ==
- Texas Flood
- Couldn't Stand the Weather Tour
- Stevie Ray Vaughan live performances

== Sources ==
- Brown, Mick (September 10, 1983). "Weekend Arts". The Guardian. London.
- Cooper, Sid (2008). It Looked So Good in the Window. Bloomington: iUniverse, Inc. ISBN 978-0-5955-2140-1.
- Haldin, Ken (September 23, 1983). "Concert Listings". Ocala Star-Banner.
- Holden, Stephen (July 25, 1983). "'Tennis Rock': McEnroe and Gerulaitis". The New York Times Digital Archive.
- Hopkins, Craig (2010). Stevie Ray Vaughan – Day by Day, Night After Night: His Early Years, 1954–1982. Milwaukee: Backbeat Books. ISBN 978-1-4234-8598-8.
- Hopkins, Craig (2011). Stevie Ray Vaughan – Day by Day, Night After Night: His Final Years, 1983–1990. Milwaukee: Backbeat Books. ISBN 978-1-61774-022-0.
- Jarvis, Elena (August 12, 1983). "Stevie Ray Vaughan tends the blues with his guitar". The Gazette Telegraph. Colorado Springs.
- LeLievre, Roger (April 18, 2013). "Hot '80s Ann Arbor ska band SLK releases old tunes digitally for new audience". The Ann Arbor News.
- Mahin, Bruce P. (September 16, 1983). "Much More concert review". Richmond Times-Dispatch.
- "Obituaries". Los Angeles Times. November 8, 2006.
- Patoski, Joe Nick; Crawford, Bill (1993). Stevie Ray Vaughan: Caught in the Crossfire. New York: Little, Brown and Company. ISBN 0-316-16069-5.
- Prown, Pete; Sharken, Lisa (2003). Gear Secrets of the Guitar Legends: How to Sound Like Your Favorite Players. San Francisco: Backbeat Books. ISBN 0-879-30751-X.
- Walek, Gordon (August 6, 1983). "ChicagoFest VI at Soldier Field". The Daily Herald. Vol. 111, no. 296. Arlington Heights.
