= List of Stevie Ray Vaughan concert tours =

Double Trouble, an American blues rock band fronted by Stevie Ray Vaughan, did various live performances throughout the world, including tours in North America, Europe, Australia, New Zealand, and Japan. In addition to normal concerts, the band has performed in both supporting and headlining roles at festivals such as the Reading Festival in 1983 and Montreux Jazz Festival in 1985, as well as many other one-off performances including Carnegie Hall. Critical and commercial response to Double Trouble live performances has generally been positive. Critics have pointed to Vaughan's aggressive on-stage intensity as a high point. In total, the band have performed 834 shows throughout their career.

Vaughan performed on all Double Trouble studio material until his death in 1990, with occasional instrumental contributions from other musicians. However, Vaughan has assembled groups of musicians to interpret songs for special live performances. While Vaughan controlled the creative and musical direction of Double Trouble in the studio, his guitar solos differed for every live performance. Several of the band's performances have been chronicled on live albums and videos.

== History ==
=== Texas Flood Tour (1983) ===
The best word I can think of to describe that tour is 'glorious.' Our record hadn't become that successful yet, but we were playing in front of coliseums full of people. We just went out and played, and it fit like a glove. The sound rang through those big coliseums like a monster. People were going crazy, and they had no idea who we were!

—Tommy Shannon in a 2000 interview

After the 1983 release of Texas Flood, Double Trouble embarked on the Texas Flood Tour in support of the album. The tour began with a series of small club performances in mid-1983. Double Trouble toured North America as an opening act for The Moody Blues in October through November 1983; for these performances, the band received $5,000 per show and a bonus for successful ticket sales. Double Trouble received considerable mainstream success thereafter, performing with significantly higher production values. The tour included a performance on Austin City Limits, which was broadcast for PBS on February 28, 1984. The band also performed a sold-out show at the Beacon Theatre in New York City. Variety described the performance by calling Vaughan "the guitar hero of the present era".

=== Couldn't Stand the Weather Tour (1984) ===
In support of Double Trouble's second full-length studio album, Couldn't Stand the Weather, the band embarked on the Couldn't Stand the Weather Tour, which began in January 1984 and ran until the end of the year. Destinations included North America, Europe, Australia, and New Zealand. During the European, Double Trouble performed at the Lorelei open-air theatre in West Germany broadcast on Rockpalast, which had a television audience of an estimated forty-one million. The tour included a sold-out performance at Carnegie Hall and featured many special guests including the Roomful of Blues horn section, Dr. John, Jimmie Vaughan, Angela Strehli, and George Rains. Double Trouble's record label, Epic Records, reportedly refused to film the concert for financial reasons. Epic instead recorded the entire show, posthumously released as Live at Carnegie Hall. The band followed with a tour in Australia and New Zealand, performing two shows at the Sydney Opera House, then concluded with a final leg in North America.

=== Japan Tour 1985 ===
In January 1985, Vaughan and Double Trouble went on their first tour of Japan. They performed at concert halls in Osaka, Nagoya, and Tokyo. On January 24, a show at Yubin Chokin Hall in Tokyo was filmed by Black Box Incorporated. A video of the show was later released as Live in Tokyo in 2007. The band also appeared on Japanese television, where Vaughan played a then-new composition named "Our Riviera Paradise"; the composition was later shortened to "Riviera Paradise" and included on the In Step album.

=== Soul to Soul Tour (1985–1986) ===
Following the recordings of Soul to Soul in March 1985, the band went back on the road for the Soul to Soul Tour. The tour began with a performance at Isla Blanca Park on South Padre Island for a spring break concert (The Isla Blanca Park show was March 19, 1987 – power problems led to SRV going acoustic through an open mic for part of the set.) At the band's next show in Manor Downs, Vaughan was named an honorary admiral of the Texas Navy by then-governor of Texas Mark White. This initial leg of the tour also included performances in Canada, performing at venues such as Massey Hall and Oshawa Civic Auditorium. The band followed with a brief leg in the United States in April, appearing at the New Orleans Jazz & Heritage Festival.

Since the final formation of Double Trouble in 1981, Vaughan wanted to expand the band, hiring Reese Wynans as their full-time keyboardist. Wynans had previously been a member of Delbert McClinton's band and had also played with Jerry Jeff Walker. He began touring with Vaughan and Double Trouble in June. The band was also a part of the Chicago Blues Festival. They were presented with Grammy Awards for Best Traditional Blues Album on their performance of "Texas Flood" at the Montreux Jazz Festival.
