= Couldn't Stand the Weather Tour =

1984–1985 concert tour

- World tour by Stevie Ray Vaughan and Double Trouble
- Promotional poster for the tour
- Location: North America, Europe, Australasia, Japan
- Associated album: Couldn't Stand the Weather
- Start date: March 10, 1984
- End date: May 4, 1985
- Legs: 12
- No. of shows: 145

Stevie Ray Vaughan and Double Trouble concert chronology
- Texas Flood Tour (1983–84); Couldn't Stand the Weather Tour (1984–85); Soul to Soul Tour (1985–86)

The Couldn't Stand the Weather Tour was a worldwide concert tour by blues rock band Stevie Ray Vaughan and Double Trouble. Produced in support of their 1984 album Couldn't Stand the Weather, the tour visited North America, Europe, Australasia and Japan from 1984 to 1985. To reflect the new musical direction that the group took with Couldn't Stand the Weather, the tour was aimed to differ from their past and surpass expectations of the band. In comparison to Vaughan and Double Trouble's modest stage setup from the previous Texas Flood Tour, the Couldn't Stand the Weather Tour involved a slightly more elaborate production. It utilized grander amplifier setups and sound systems to take advantage of the larger venues in which they performed. To avoid their renowned strictly blues material, Vaughan and Double Trouble embodied a more expanded and varied repertoire during performances. In disparity to the previous tour, each of the Couldn't Stand the Weather shows opened with mostly the same three songs before other material was played. The album and the tour were the beginnings of the group's mid-eighties musical development.

Consisting of twelve legs and 145 shows, (Note: The September 29, 1984 show was a dress rehearsal for the band's Carnegie Hall performance and featured a paying audience. Sources conflict on whether this is considered an official show from the tour. Craig Hopkins' book Stevie Ray Vaughan: Day by Day, Night After Night lists it, but the Stevie Ray Vaughan concert fan site SRV Gig Database excludes it. For purposes of completeness, it is counted in this article, bringing the show total to 145.) the tour commenced in Southampton, New York, on March 10, 1984, and concluded in San Antonio, Texas, on May 4, 1985. The first seven legs alternated between North America and Europe, before the following leg took the band to Carnegie Hall. After this leg, the tour's schedule was expanded for concert halls in Oceania, which was branded "First Tour of Australia", accordingly. Despite a variety of reactions from music critics, the tour received mostly positive reviews. Among other top-grossing concerts on the tour, nearly all of the Australian performances were sold-out over its seven-show period. The band's 1985 album Soul to Soul, which saw the addition of a fourth band member, was recorded during breaks in the tour, and its songs were played during the succeeding Soul to Soul Tour. By many accounts, the Couldn't Stand the Weather Tour was regarded as one of the band's busiest tours—in 1997, drummer Chris Layton recalled "at that point in time, it was like delirium seemed to be setting in".

== Background ==
Stevie Ray Vaughan and Double Trouble's debut album Texas Flood and the supporting Texas Flood Tour brought them to commercial and critical success, particularly in the United States and Europe. Like their other tours, the Texas Flood Tour was a basic, minimalist production, and they used this outlet to focus on musical and instrumentation aspects. As a result, the band warranted a renowned strictly blues repertoire, a reputation that became an obstacle of reluctance after their critically acclaimed cover version of the Jimi Hendrix song, "Voodoo Child (Slight Return)", which captured Vaughan's exploration of Hendrix. The band was pressured to remain pure to the blues and "steer clear of Jimi". Their 1983 Texas Flood Tour featured several Hendrix compositions in their setlist, and during a break in the tour, drummer Chris Layton recalled that "It came down to this question: are we going to move forward and push things to the limit, or are we going to cater to the purists and do straight blues shuffles?", encouraging progress for the group.

== Planning, itinerary, and ticketing ==
Before the tour began, a showcase took place on March 6, 1984, at the Sheraton Waikiki Hotel in Honolulu. Vaughan found it increasingly challenging to recreate all the sounds from the newly recorded album. They attempted using additional musicians, but their sentimental attachment to a three-piece prevailed for the time being.

On March 8, the band departed Austin for the Northeast to begin the tour. The tour's opening night took place on March 10, 1984, at Southampton College in Southampton, New York. Unlike the group's previous tour, which began immediately after the release of Texas Flood, the tour started two months before Couldn't Stand the Weather was released, allowing fans to familiarize themselves with the new songs. By opening night, Texas Flood had already sold over 300,000 copies in the US and 50,000 in Canada. For the opening two legs, 17 concerts in the US and Scandinavia were scheduled. Four days after the tour's beginning, tickets for the Scotia, New York show were sold out. The third leg of the tour, consisting of 23 shows in the US, took place from April to May 1984. On April 29, 1984, the band played Buffalo, NY for the 2nd time and this is when Stevie was given the Hamiltone (also known as "Main" or the "Couldn't Stand the Weather" guitar) it was a custom Stratocaster-style guitar made for Vaughan by James Hamilton in Buffalo, NY. It was presented to Vaughan by James as a gift from ZZ Top's Billy Gibbons. In very few cases, slow ticket sales led to canceled shows. Due to a promotional slump, a concert scheduled at Dickinson College in Carlisle, Pennsylvania was canceled. However, larger concerts all around the US opening for Huey Lewis and the News on their sold-out 1984–85 world tour helped to increase the tour's profits.

Two additional legs were immediately scheduled and just as, if not more, successful as the previous leg: the North American legs from June–August 1984, the European leg in August 1984, the US leg in September 1984, and the US "Fall Foliage" leg from September–October 1984. While playing other venues motivated the band, Vaughan and Double Trouble saw their Carnegie Hall appearance as an opportunity to show fans an expanded musical lineup, imagining the special aspects that would be used in such a historic space. Rehearsals for Carnegie Hall began at the Third Coast soundstage in Austin, in September 1984; a public rehearsal show was held on September 29 at the Caravan of Dreams in Fort Worth. Technical and dress rehearsals were incorporated into preparing for the show. Days before the show, the group canceled a Union, New Jersey concert, due to a final rehearsal that was scheduled in New York. By the time the concert began, the group had sold all 2,200 tickets.

The following leg, which began in late October, was the band's first full tour of Oceania and marked the first time they had visited the area. Scheduling for the year-end leg in California in late November afforded the band off-time between legs than the previous tour, but this amplified the exhaustion and delirium that had set in by the tour's end.

== Recording and release of Soul to Soul ==
Vaughan and Double Trouble recorded their next album, Soul to Soul, from March to May 1985 during breaks in the final two legs of the tour. The album was intended to be recorded in a month, but soon expanded into three months. Recording could not be completed before the final leg started, and for the first two weeks of the Soul to Soul sessions, the band wasted much time in the studio, recording until the early morning. Shannon called the sessions "a pretty strange time", while Layton said of it, "It was a bad combination–the long haul, we were all becoming really, really exhausted, but we kept ourselves propped up by doing more drugs." Shannon also said their substance abuse began to take its toll on the band. The album was ultimately released on September 30, 1985. Inspired by the additional musicians featured on select dates on the tour, Soul to Soul was an even greater divergence in style from their earlier recordings, incorporating organ and piano from newly hired band member Reese Wynans. A number of songs from the forthcoming album were included in the final two legs, most frequently early versions of "Say What!" and "Come On (Part III)". An early instrumental version of "Life Without You" was also added to the encore.

== Critical response ==
Many critics published favorable reviews about the tour; The Lakeland Ledger said that the band didn't disappoint, relying on "their music and themselves to entertain". The News & Observer wrote, "The crowd was still shouting for more when Vaughan unstrapped his guitar and said good night." Others praised the Carnegie Hall show; Stephen Holden of The New York Times acknowledged that Vaughan's talents were "handsomely displayed" and "filled with verve". The Dallas Times Herald said that "it was on the slow, bluesy stuff that the Carnegie Hall sound really helped", despite the fact that the hall's "fabled acoustics [didn't] seem to work so well for rock 'n' roll". The Age praised the Australian leg and assured readers that "none of the publicity is exaggerated". It observed that Vaughan was the "complete master of his instruments" and did it with a "minimum of fuss or flash". The Press wrote about the show in Christchurch, "There must be something about coming from the Lone Star State. The Austin, Texas guitarist turned in a virtuoso performance. ...Vaughan and the band showed they could play with a vengeance, notably in 'Love Struck Baby' and 'Pride and Joy,' both highlights of the concert."

Some critics indicated faults in the band's live mix. At the July 2 show in Saint Paul, Minnesota, the Dallas Times Herald noted that the acoustics in the room were awful, and the sound system provided was faulty. After the show, Vaughan said, "I'm sorry anybody had to see that. Those people out there deserved better." The review went on to say that "the fans jammed as close to the stage as they could get, trying to get a better look at his hands, trying to figure out where the magic was coming from". The Age said that Vaughan's voice was mixed back too far for much of it to be heard, "especially on the louder material".

== Typical Setlist ==
1. "Scuttle Buttin'"
2. "Voodoo Child (Slight Return)" (The Jimi Hendrix Experience cover)
3. "Testify" (The Isley Brothers cover)
4. "The Things (That) I Used to Do" (Guitar Slim cover)
5. "Mary Had a Little Lamb" (traditional cover)
6. "Tin Pan Alley" (Bob Geddins cover)
7. "Love Struck Baby"
8. "Cold Shot"
9. "Couldn't Stand the Weather"
10. "Pride and Joy"
11. "Texas Flood" (Larry Davis cover)
12. "Rude Mood"
13. "Lenny"

== Tour dates ==
List of concerts, showing date, city, country, venue, and opening act(s)
Date	City	Country	Venue	Opening Act(s)	Attendance	Revenue
Leg 1: North America and Europe
March 10, 1984	Southampton	United States	Fine Arts Theatre	Steve Bassett	—N/a	—N/a
March 11, 1984	Sunderland	United States	Rusty Nail Inn	Steve Bassett	—N/a	—N/a
March 13, 1984	Poughkeepsie	United States	The Chance	Steve Bassett	—N/a	—N/a
March 14, 1984	Union	United States	Wilkins Theatre	Steve Bassett	—N/a	—N/a
March 15, 1984	Scotia	United States	Radio City	Steve Bassett	1,000 / 1,000	$8,000
March 16, 1984	Providence	United States	Donovan Center	Duke Robillard and the Pleasure Kings, Steve Bassett	—N/a	—N/a
March 17, 1984	New Haven	United States	Twilight Zone	Steve Bassett	—N/a	—N/a
March 21, 1984	Copenhagen	Denmark	Alexandra Rock Teater		—N/a	—N/a
March 22, 1984	Oslo	Norway	Club 7		—N/a	—N/a
March 23, 1984	Voss	Norway	Voss Kino		—N/a	—N/a
March 24, 1984	Bergen	Norway	Hulen		—N/a	—N/a
March 25, 1984	Trondheim	Norway	Skansen		—N/a	—N/a
March 27, 1984	Helsinki	Finland	Kulttuuritalo	The Run Runs	—N/a	—N/a
March 28, 1984	Tampere	Finland	Tampere University of Technology Auditorium	The Run Runs	—N/a	—N/a
March 29, 1984	Oulu	Finland	Urheilutalo		—N/a	—N/a
March 30, 1984	Stockholm	Sweden	Ritz		—N/a	—N/a
March 31, 1984	Lund	Sweden	Pub Sparta		—N/a	—N/a
Leg 2: North America
April 15, 1984	Austin	United States	Auditorium Shores	Angela Strehli, Townes Van Zandt	—N/a	—N/a
April 19, 1984	Greenville	United States	Greenleaf Theater	Steve Bassett	—N/a	—N/a
April 20, 1984	Williamsburg	United States	William & Mary Hall	The Alarm	—N/a	—N/a
April 22, 1984	Roslyn	United States	My Father's Place	Rocket 88	—N/a	—N/a
April 25, 1984	North Brunswick	United States	The Metro	Roustabout	—N/a	—N/a
April 27, 1984	Plattsburgh	United States	Hawkins Hall Auditorium		—N/a	—N/a
April 28, 1984	New Paltz	United States	Tripping Fields	Frank Marino, Danny Johnson and the Bandits	—N/a	—N/a
April 28, 1984	Poughkeepsie	United States	The Chance		—N/a	—N/a
April 29, 1984	Buffalo	United States	Baird Point	Cyndi Lauper	—N/a	—N/a
May 2, 1984	Garden City	United States	Nassau Community College Ballroom		—N/a	—N/a
May 4, 1984	Bristol	United States	Paolino Recreation Center	David Johansen	—N/a	—N/a
May 6, 1984	Oneonta	United States	Arnold Hall	Artie Traum	—N/a	—N/a
May 7, 1984	Geneva	United States	Smith Opera House	Artie Traum	—N/a	—N/a
May 12, 1984	Oklahoma City	United States	Zoo Amphitheatre		9,002 / 9,002	$108,024
May 13, 1984	Tulsa	United States	Mohawk Park	Jim Sweney and the Jumpshotz	15,532 / 15,532	$161,404
May 15, 1984	Little Rock	United States	Barton Coliseum		7,381 / 10,025	$84,881
May 16, 1984	St. Louis	United States	Kiel Auditorium		—N/a	—N/a
May 17, 1984	Davenport	United States	Palmer Alumni Auditorium		4,500 / 4,500	$55,875
May 18, 1984	Dubuque	United States	Five Flags Center		5,200 / 5,200	$64,287
May 19, 1984	Kansas City	United States	Starlight Theatre		8,341 / 8,341	$101,654
May 20, 1984	Wichita	United States	Kansas Coliseum		7,233 / 7,233	$92,220
May 23, 1984	Austin	United States	Austin Opera House	The Fabulous Thunderbirds	—N/a	—N/a
May 28, 1984	Memphis	United States	Memphis Cotton Carnival MusicFest	Danny Tate, Panther Burns	—N/a	—N/a
Leg 3: North America
June 15, 1984	Irvine	United States	Irvine Meadows Amphitheatre		14,615 / 14,615	$204,570
June 16, 1984	Los Angeles	United States	Hollywood Palladium	Billy Rankin	—N/a	—N/a
June 17, 1984	San Francisco	United States	Kabuki Nightclub	Philip Wellford	—N/a	—N/a
June 19, 1984	Portland	United States	Portland Civic Auditorium	Widow	—N/a	—N/a
June 20, 1984	Seattle	United States	Paramount Theatre	Dwight Twilley Band, Widow	—N/a	—N/a
June 21, 1984	Vancouver	Canada	Commodore Ballroom	Wailin' Walker and the House Rockers	—N/a	—N/a
June 22, 1984	Victoria	Canada	Royal Theatre	The Dice	—N/a	—N/a
June 24, 1984	Calgary	Canada	Max Bell Centre	The Dice	—N/a	—N/a
June 25, 1984	Edmonton	Canada	Convention Inn South Ballroom		—N/a	—N/a
June 26, 1984	Saskatoon	Canada	Saskatoon Centennial Auditorium	Colin Munn	—N/a	—N/a
June 28, 1984	Regina	Canada	Saskatchewan Centre of the Arts	Colin Munn	—N/a	—N/a
June 29, 1984	McCreary	Canada	Beaver Dam Lake	Gregg Allman Band, Murray McLauchlan	—N/a	—N/a
July 2, 1984	Saint Paul	United States	Prom Ballroom	Raggs	—N/a	—N/a
July 3, 1984	Milwaukee	United States	Summerfest Grounds	Duke Jupiter, The Piranha Brothers	—N/a	—N/a
July 5, 1984	Rockford	United States	Coronado Theatre	Duke Tumatoe and the Power Trio	—N/a	—N/a
July 6, 1984	Peoria	United States	Peoria Civic Center Arena		—N/a	—N/a
July 8, 1984	Morrison	United States	Red Rocks Amphitheatre	Talk Talk	—N/a	—N/a
July 10, 1984	Amarillo	United States	Amarillo Civic Center Auditorium	Duke Jupiter	—N/a	—N/a
July 11, 1984	Lubbock	United States	Lubbock Municipal Auditorium	Duke Jupiter	—N/a	—N/a
July 12, 1984	Dallas	United States	Fair Park Bandshell	Duke Jupiter	—N/a	—N/a
July 13, 1984	San Antonio	United States	Majestic Performing Arts Center	Duke Jupiter	—N/a	—N/a
July 15, 1984	Temple	United States	Mayborn Civic Center	Duke Jupiter	—N/a	—N/a
July 18, 1984	Houston	United States	Houston Music Hall	Duke Jupiter, Angela Strehli	—N/a	—N/a
July 19, 1984	Houston	United States	Houston Music Hall	Duke Jupiter, Angela Strehli	—N/a	—N/a
July 20, 1984	Corpus Christi	United States	Bayfront Plaza Auditorium	Duke Jupiter	—N/a	—N/a
July 21, 1984	Austin	United States	Palmer Auditorium	Duke Jupiter, Angela Strehli	—N/a	—N/a
Leg 4: North America
July 27, 1984	New Britain	United States	Willow Brook Park	Charlie Daniels Band	9,652 / (unlimited)	$144,780
July 28, 1984	Boston	United States	The Channel	Danny Mo and the Exciters	—N/a	—N/a
July 29, 1984	Salem	United States	Winter Island		—N/a	—N/a
August 1, 1984	New York City	United States	Pier 84	Gregg Allman Band	—N/a	—N/a
August 3, 1984	Tampa	United States	USF Sun Dome		11,468 / 11,468	$143,350
August 4, 1984	Jacksonville	United States	Jacksonville Veterans Memorial Coliseum		11,676 / 11,676	$145,075
August 5, 1984	Columbia	United States	Carolina Coliseum		8,285 / 12,352	$103,567
August 6, 1984	Charlotte	United States	Charlotte Coliseum		7,009 / 12,900	$87,612
August 8, 1984	Atlanta	United States	Omni Coliseum		11,581 / 17,129	$144,762
August 9, 1984	Greensboro	United States	Greensboro Coliseum		11,774 / 15,887	$147,175
August 10, 1984	Roanoke	United States	Roanoke Civic Center		10,853 / 10,853	$137,292
August 11, 1984	Norfolk	United States	Norfolk Scope		12,910 / 13,800	$161,375
August 12, 1984	Harrisburg	United States	City Island		2,918 / 12,000	$97,273
August 14, 1984	Toronto	Canada	Toronto Concert Hall		—N/a	—N/a
August 16, 1984	Ottawa	Canada	National Arts Centre	Saints and Sinners	—N/a	—N/a
August 17, 1984	Montreal	Canada	Spectrum de Montréal	Jimmy James	—N/a	—N/a
Leg 5: Europe
August 25, 1984	Sankt Goarshausen	West Germany	Freilichtbühne Loreley	Paul Brady, Greg Kihn Band	—N/a	—N/a
August 27, 1984	Munich	West Germany	Alabama-Halle	Tutti Bandi	—N/a	—N/a
Leg 6: North America
September 2, 1984	Shreveport	United States	Veterans Park Amphitheatre	"A" Train, Danny Johnson and the Bandits	—N/a	—N/a
September 7, 1984	Chicago	United States	Aragon Ballroom	Albert Collins	5,500 / 5,500	$55,440
September 8, 1984	Royal Oak	United States	Royal Oak Music Theatre		—N/a	—N/a
September 9, 1984	Dayton	United States	Hara Arena	Dale Walton's 2nd Wind	—N/a	—N/a
September 10, 1984	Indianapolis	United States	Clowes Memorial Hall	Rods 'n' Cones	2,127 / 2,182	$24,461
September 13, 1984	Nashville	United States	Memorial Gymnasium	Will Rambeaux and the Delta Hurricanes	—N/a	—N/a
September 14, 1984	Memphis	United States	Orpheum Theatre	Koko Taylor	—N/a	—N/a
September 15, 1984	Greenville	United States	Freedom Village	Bo Diddley, Robert Cray Band	—N/a	—N/a
September 16, 1984	Fort Worth	United States	Will Rogers Coliseum	Van Wilks	—N/a	—N/a
Leg 7: North America ("Fall Foliage")
September 29, 1984	Fort Worth	United States	Caravan of Dreams		—N/a	—N/a
October 4, 1984	New York City	United States	Carnegie Hall		2,200 / 2,200	—N/a
October 6, 1984	Boston	United States	Orpheum Theatre	Jason and the Scorchers	—N/a	—N/a
October 7, 1984	West Hartford	United States	Agora Ballroom	Jason and the Scorchers	—N/a	—N/a
October 9, 1984	Hempstead	United States	Adams Playhouse	Jason and the Scorchers	—N/a	—N/a
October 10, 1984	Philadelphia	United States	Irvine Auditorium	Spinning Infant	—N/a	—N/a
October 11, 1984	Washington, D.C.	United States	Constitution Hall	Jason and the Scorchers	—N/a	—N/a
October 12, 1984	Pittsburgh	United States	Syria Mosque	Jason and the Scorchers	2,329 / 3,774	$48,119
October 14, 1984	Cleveland	United States	Variety Theatre	Jason and the Scorchers	—N/a	—N/a
October 19, 1984	Phoenix	United States	Arizona Veterans Memorial Coliseum		—N/a	—N/a
October 20, 1984	El Paso	United States	El Paso County Coliseum	The Nelsons	1,498 / 8,050	—N/a
Leg 8: Australasia
October 26, 1984	Melbourne	Australia	Melbourne Concert Hall	Tinsley Waterhouse Band	—N/a	—N/a
October 28, 1984	Melbourne	Australia	Melbourne Concert Hall	Bachelors from Prague	—N/a	—N/a
October 31, 1984	Melbourne	Australia	Melbourne Concert Hall	Tinsley Waterhouse Band	—N/a	—N/a
November 1, 1984	Adelaide	Australia	Adelaide Festival Theatre	The Flyers	—N/a	—N/a
November 3, 1984	Brisbane	Australia	Brisbane Festival Hall	The Aussie Rebels	—N/a	—N/a
November 5, 1984	Sydney	Australia	Sydney Opera House	The Champions	—N/a	—N/a
November 9, 1984	Sydney	Australia	Sydney Opera House	The Champions	—N/a	—N/a
November 11, 1984	Palmerston North	New Zealand	Palmerston North Stadium	Chris Thompson	—N/a	—N/a
November 12, 1984	Wellington	New Zealand	Wellington Town Hall	Chris Thompson	—N/a	—N/a
November 13, 1984	Christchurch	New Zealand	Christchurch Town Hall	Chris Thompson	—N/a	—N/a
November 14, 1984	Auckland	New Zealand	Logan Campbell Centre	Chris Thompson	—N/a	—N/a
Leg 9: North America
November 20, 1984	Santa Barbara	United States	Arlington Theatre	James Harman Band	—N/a	—N/a
November 21, 1984	Universal City	United States	Universal Amphitheatre	Joe Ely	6,251 / 6,251	$87,367
November 23, 1984	Fresno	United States	Warnors Theatre	Dr. Gonzo	—N/a	—N/a
November 24, 1984	San Francisco	United States	Warfield Theatre	Dr. Gonzo	4,400 / 4,400	$60,760
November 25, 1984	San Francisco	United States	Warfield Theatre	Dr. Gonzo	4,400 / 4,400	$60,760
November 27, 1984	Santa Cruz	United States	Santa Cruz Civic Auditorium	Dr. Gonzo	1,964 / 1,964	$26,514
November 28, 1984	Davis	United States	Freeborn Hall	Bourgeois Tagg	—N/a	—N/a
November 29, 1984	Oroville	United States	Butte College Gym	Ralph Shine Blues Band	—N/a	—N/a
November 30, 1984	Arcata	United States	HSU East Gym	Jimmy Lyon	—N/a	—N/a
Leg 10: Japan
January 20, 1985	Osaka	Japan	Osaka Kōsei Nenkin Kaikan	Kenji Jammer	—N/a	—N/a
January 21, 1985	Nagoya	Japan	Unryu Hall	Kenji Jammer	—N/a	—N/a
January 23, 1985	Tokyo	Japan	Yubin Chokin Kaikan	Kenji Jammer	—N/a	—N/a
January 24, 1985	Tokyo	Japan	Yubin Chokin Kaikan	Kenji Jammer	—N/a	—N/a
January 25, 1985	Tokyo	Japan	Yubin Chokin Kaikan	Kenji Jammer	—N/a	—N/a
Leg 11: North America
March 10, 1985	South Padre Island	United States	Isla Blanca Park	Joe King Carrasco and the Crowns	—N/a	—N/a
March 21, 1985	Manor	United States	Manor Downs	Jerry Jeff Walker, Delbert McClinton	—N/a	—N/a
March 23, 1985	Boston	United States	Boston Opera House	Albert King	—N/a	—N/a
March 24, 1985	Worcester	United States	E.M. Loew's Center	Luther "Guitar Junior" Johnson	—N/a	—N/a
March 27, 1985	Hamilton	Canada	Hamilton Place Great Hall	Johnny MacLeod with the Young Pioneers	—N/a	—N/a
March 28, 1985	Waterloo	Canada	Super Skate Seven	Johnny MacLeod with the Young Pioneers	—N/a	—N/a
March 29, 1985	Toronto	Canada	Massey Hall	Johnny MacLeod with the Young Pioneers	—N/a	—N/a
March 30, 1985	Oshawa	Canada	Oshawa Civic Auditorium	Johnny MacLeod with the Young Pioneers	—N/a	—N/a
Leg 12: North America
April 21, 1985	Dallas	United States	Dallas Convention Center Arena	Lonnie Mack	—N/a	—N/a
April 24, 1985	Omaha	United States	Omaha Music Hall	Tim Krekel and the Sluggers	2,476 / 2,608	$26,306
April 25, 1985	Wichita	United States	Cotillion Ballroom	Lonnie Mack	—N/a	—N/a
April 27, 1985	Oklahoma City	United States	Zoo Amphitheatre	Gregg Allman Band, Lonnie Mack	—N/a	—N/a
April 28, 1985	Tulsa	United States	Mohawk Park	Gregg Allman Band, Lonnie Mack	—N/a	—N/a
April 30, 1985	Corpus Christi	United States	Bayfront Plaza Auditorium	Eric Johnson	—N/a	—N/a
May 2, 1985	New Orleans	United States	Riverboat President	Albert King, Clarence "Gatemouth" Brown	—N/a	—N/a
May 4, 1985	San Antonio	United States	Majestic Performing Arts Center	Emerald	—N/a	—N/a
