= Soul to Soul Tour =

1985–86 concert tour

- World tour by Stevie Ray Vaughan and Double Trouble
- Poster to the concert in Bonn, East Germany
- Location: North America, Europe, Australasia
- Associated album: Soul to Soul
- Start date: June 7, 1985
- End date: October 2, 1986
- Legs: 7 in North America; 2 in Europe; 1 in Oceania; 9 total
- No. of shows: 158 in North America; 25 in Europe; 18 in Oceania; 201 total, 13 cancelled

Stevie Ray Vaughan and Double Trouble concert chronology
- Couldn't Stand the Weather Tour (1984–85); Soul to Soul Tour (1985–86); Live Alive Tour (1986–88)

The Soul to Soul Tour was a concert tour through North America, Europe and Australasia, undertaken by American blues rock band Stevie Ray Vaughan and Double Trouble from 1985 through 1986. At the beginning of the tour, the band had finished recording their album Soul to Soul. Their commercial and critical acclaim had been demonstrated during the Couldn't Stand the Weather Tour in 1984, when they had played before a sold-out audience at Carnegie Hall. Longing for opportunities to expand the group's lineup, Vaughan and Double Trouble hired keyboardist Reese Wynans during the Soul to Soul recording sessions in Dallas, Texas. Throughout the tour, the band's success was confirmed as their performances consistently amazed and gratified their audiences.

The first leg of the tour's itinerary took the band to the United States and then on to Europe, where they performed for nearly two weeks. They then returned to North America where during a span of eight months, they alternated visits between the US and Canada, before the fifth leg took the group to Australasia. After two additional North American legs, the band made a second trip to Europe, where the schedule of performances was interrupted after Vaughan suffered a mental breakdown, although he continued to perform two more shows with Double Trouble. The final leg in Europe incorporated stops in seven countries, before the group's return to the US in October 1986.

Although the tour elicited a variety of reactions from music critics, it was generally well received. Among several sold-out shows, the Farm Aid concert sold over 40,000 tickets. The band's 1986 live album, Live Alive, was recorded during select shows of the tour, and many of its songs were played in 1986 through 1988. The length of the Soul to Soul Tour, then Vaughan and Double Trouble's longest, exhausted the band as the final leg unfolded. However, the extended break at the tour's conclusion enabled both Vaughan and bassist Tommy Shannon to enter treatment for drug and alcohol addictions and successfully achieve sobriety. In Vaughan's case, this lifestyle would continue through further tours in the following four years, prior to his death in a helicopter accident in August 1990.

== Background ==
Stevie Ray Vaughan is widely regarded as one of the most influential electric guitarists in the history of blues music, and one of the most important musicians in the revival of blues in the 1980s. Allmusic describes him as "a rocking powerhouse of a guitarist who gave blues a burst of momentum in the '80s, with influence still felt long after his tragic death." Despite a mainstream career that spanned only seven years, Vaughan eventually became recognized among musicians as the future standard for success and promise in blues. Biographer Craig Hopkins explains that Vaughan's talent was the result of the youth culture in the 1960s: "the popularity of playing instruments as a form of teen entertainment, the prevalence of teen dances, the success of his older brother, the practicality of playing guitar as an outlet for a shy boy and the singular, intense focus on the guitar all contributed to create one of the best electric guitar players of all time."

Born and raised in Dallas, Texas, Vaughan began playing guitar at the age of seven, inspired by his older brother Jimmie Vaughan. He was an apt pupil, no less quick to learn than his brother, and was playing the guitar with striking virtuosity by the time he was fourteen. In 1971, he dropped out of high school and moved to Austin the following year. Soon afterward, he began playing gigs on the nightclub circuit, earning a spot in Marc Benno's band, the Nightcrawlers, and later with Denny Freeman in the Cobras, with whom he continued to work through late 1977. He then formed his own group, Double Trouble, before performing at the Montreux Jazz Festival in mid-July 1982 and being discovered by John Hammond, who in turn interested Epic Records with signing them to a recording contract. Within a year, they achieved international fame after the release of their debut album Texas Flood, and in 1984 their second album, Couldn't Stand the Weather, along with the supporting tour, brought them to further commercial and critical success; the album quickly outpaced the sales of Texas Flood.

In October 1984, Vaughan and Double Trouble headlined a sold-out performance at Carnegie Hall in New York City. For the second half of the concert, he added guitarist Jimmie Vaughan, keyboardist Dr. John, drummer George Rains, and the Roomful of Blues horn section. The ensemble rehearsed for less than two weeks before the performance, and according to biographers Joe Nick Patoski and Bill Crawford, the big band concept never entirely took form. However, Vaughan was determined to deviate from the group's power trio format: "We won't be limited to just the trio, although that doesn't mean we'll stop doing the trio. I'm planning on doing that too. I ain't gonna stay in one place. If I do, I'm stupid." As recording began for the band's third studio album, Soul to Soul, Vaughan found it increasingly difficult to be able to play rhythm guitar parts and sing at the same time, and was longing to add another dimension to the band. They hired keyboardist Reese Wynans to record on the album in April 1985; he joined the band soon thereafter.

== Tour itinerary ==
For the opening leg, 21 concerts in the United States and Europe were scheduled from June through July 1985. The second leg of the tour consisted of 23 shows in North America from July to September. Two additional US legs were planned: the third leg from September–December 1985, and the fourth leg from January–March 1986. The fifth leg, which began in March, was the band's second full tour of Australasia and marked the first time they had visited certain venues. Scheduling for the sixth and seventh legs in North America from April–August allowed the band more off-days between shows than previous legs, but this amplified the exhaustion that had set in by the tour's end.

== Typical Setlist ==
1. "Scuttle Buttin'"
2. "Say What!"
3. "Ain't Gone 'n' Give Up on Love"
4. Lookin' Out the Window
5. "Look at Little Sister" (Hank Ballard cover)
6. "Mary Had a Little Lamb" (Buddy Guy cover)
7. "Voodoo Child (Slight Return)" (The Jimi Hendrix Experience cover)
8. "Pride and Joy"
9. "Cold Shot"
10. "Come On (Part I)" (Earl King cover)
11. "Couldn't Stand the Weather"
12. "Love Struck Baby"
13. "Life Without You" or "Testify" (The Isley Brothers cover) or "Third Stone From the Sun" (The Jimi Hendrix Experience cover) or "Rude Mood'

== Tour dates ==
List of concerts, showing date, city, country, venue, and opening act(s)
Date	City	Country	Venue	Opening Act(s)	Attendance	Revenue
United States
June 7, 1985	Chicago	United States	Petrillo Music Shell	Koko Taylor, Sugar Blue	—N/a	—N/a
June 8, 1985	Grand Rapids	United States	Welsh Auditorium	Flash Kahan	2,653 / 3,354	$35,815
June 9, 1985	Cuyahoga Falls	United States	Blossom Music Center	Ray Charles, Bobby "Blue" Bland	—N/a	—N/a
June 14, 1985	Santa Fe	United States	Paolo Soleri Amphitheater	Gary Eckard	—N/a	—N/a
June 16, 1985	Los Angeles	United States	Hollywood Bowl	Horace Silver Quintet, Chico Freeman	—N/a	—N/a
June 19, 1985	Morrison	United States	Red Rocks Amphitheatre	B.B. King, Albert King	8,886 / 8,886	$140,707
June 21, 1985	Del Mar	United States	Del Mar Fairgrounds Grandstand		—N/a	—N/a
June 25, 1985	New York City	United States	Avery Fisher Hall	Benny Goodman, Carrie Smith	—N/a	—N/a
June 26, 1985	Red Bank	United States	Count Basie Theatre	The Shades	—N/a	—N/a
June 28, 1985	Hampton	United States	Hampton Coliseum	Jeffrey Osborne, The Manhattans	—N/a	—N/a
June 29, 1985	Washington, D.C.	United States	Constitution Hall		—N/a	—N/a
June 30, 1985	Saratoga Springs	United States	Saratoga Performing Arts Center	Dave Brubeck Quartet, Woody Herman	—N/a	—N/a
Europe
July 5, 1985	Hamburg	West Germany	Fabrik		—N/a	—N/a
July 7, 1985	Stockholm	Sweden	Skeppsholmen		—N/a	—N/a
July 8, 1985	Oslo	Norway	Chateau Neuf		—N/a	—N/a
July 9, 1985	Bergen	Norway	Oleana		—N/a	—N/a
July 11, 1985	Pori	Finland	Kirjurinluoto	Mezzoforte	—N/a	—N/a
July 11, 1985	Pori	Finland	Rantasipi Yyteri	Mombasa, New Jungle Orchestra	—N/a	—N/a
July 12, 1985	Vienne	France	Theatre Antique de Vienne	Johnny Otis Show, Johnny Copeland & Arthur Blythe	—N/a	—N/a
July 13, 1985	The Hague	Netherlands	Nederlands Congresgebouw	B.B. King, Miles Davis Septet	—N/a	—N/a
July 14, 1985	Perugia	Italy	Piazza IV Novembre	Bushrock, Umbria Jazz All-Stars	—N/a	—N/a
July 15, 1985	Montreux	Switzerland	Montreux Casino	Duke Robillard and the Pleasure Kings	—N/a	—N/a
North America
July 23, 1985	Montreal	Canada	Montreal Forum		—N/a	—N/a
July 24, 1985	Ottawa	Canada	Ottawa Civic Centre		—N/a	—N/a
July 25, 1985	Ottawa	Canada	Ottawa Civic Centre		—N/a	—N/a
July 26, 1985	Toronto	Canada	Varsity Arena		—N/a	—N/a
July 27, 1985	Toronto	Canada	Varsity Arena		—N/a	—N/a
July 28, 1985	Toronto	Canada	Varsity Arena		—N/a	—N/a
July 29, 1985	Toronto	Canada	Varsity Arena		—N/a	—N/a
July 31, 1985	Rochester Hills	United States	Baldwin Memorial Pavilion	James Cotton Blues Band	—N/a	—N/a
August 9, 1985	Baltimore	United States	Pier Six Pavilion		3,133 / 3,133	$32,563
August 10, 1985	New York City	United States	Pier 84		—N/a	—N/a
August 12, 1985	Albany	United States	Palace Theatre	The Sharks	2,997 / 2,997	$37,463
August 16, 1985	Kingston	United States	Ulster Performing Arts Center	Jump Street	—N/a	—N/a
August 17, 1985	West Hartford	United States	Agora Ballroom	Shaboo All-Stars	—N/a	—N/a
August 18, 1985	Newport	United States	Fort Adams State Park	Wynton Marsalis Quartet, Lee Ritenour & Dave Grusin	—N/a	—N/a
August 27, 1985	Edmonton	Canada	Northern Alberta Jubilee Auditorium	Colin Munn	—N/a	—N/a
August 28, 1985	Calgary	Canada	Southern Alberta Jubilee Auditorium	Colin Munn	—N/a	—N/a
August 29, 1985	Vancouver	Canada	Commodore Ballroom	Mud Bay Blues Band	—N/a	—N/a
August 30, 1985	Victoria	Canada	Royal Theatre	The Wardells	—N/a	—N/a
August 31, 1985	Vancouver	Canada	Commodore Ballroom	Mud Bay Blues Band	—N/a	—N/a
September 1, 1985	Seattle	United States	Seattle Center Coliseum	Slamhound Hunters	—N/a	—N/a
September 2, 1985	Salem	United States	Oregon State Penitentiary		—N/a	—N/a
September 6, 1985	South Bend	United States	Morris Civic Auditorium	Spandex	—N/a	—N/a
September 7, 1985	Pittsburgh	United States	Heinz Hall for the Performing Arts	Albert King	—N/a	—N/a
September 19, 1985	Tucson	United States	McKale Center		9,914 / 10,000	$120,555
September 21, 1985	Passaic	United States	Capitol Theatre		—N/a	—N/a
United States
September 24, 1985	Dayton	United States	Hara Arena	Johnny Copeland	—N/a	—N/a
September 25, 1985	Fort Wayne	United States	Foellinger Theatre	Johnny Copeland	—N/a	—N/a
September 26, 1985	Cleveland	United States	Cleveland Music Hall	Johnny Copeland	3,000 / 3,000	—N/a
September 27, 1985	Ann Arbor	United States	Hill Auditorium	Johnny Copeland	—N/a	—N/a
September 28, 1985	Louisville	United States	Louisville Gardens	Johnny Copeland	—N/a	—N/a
September 29, 1985	Columbus	United States	Veterans Memorial Auditorium	Johnny Copeland	—N/a	—N/a
October 1, 1985	Toledo	United States	Masonic Auditorium	Johnny Copeland	—N/a	—N/a
October 2, 1985	Kalamazoo	United States	Miller Auditorium	Johnny Copeland	—N/a	—N/a
October 4, 1985	Davenport	United States	The Col Ballroom	Johnny Copeland	—N/a	—N/a
October 5, 1985	Springfield	United States	McDonald Arena	Johnny Copeland	—N/a	—N/a
October 7, 1985	Laramie	United States	Arts & Sciences Auditorium	Lonnie Mack	—N/a	—N/a
October 8, 1985	Boulder	United States	Colorado University Events Center	Lonnie Mack	—N/a	—N/a
October 9, 1985	Salt Lake City	United States	Utah State Fairgrounds Coliseum	Lonnie Mack	—N/a	—N/a
October 11, 1985	Berkeley	United States	Hearst Greek Theatre	Lonnie Mack	6,240 / 8,000	$87,993
October 12, 1985	Los Angeles	United States	Greek Theatre	Lonnie Mack	6,187 / 6,187	—N/a
October 13, 1985	San Diego	United States	UCSD Gymnasium	Lonnie Mack	—N/a	—N/a
October 15, 1985	Santa Cruz	United States	Santa Cruz Civic Auditorium	Mitch Woods and His Rocket 88's	—N/a	—N/a
October 16, 1985	Santa Barbara	United States	Arlington Theatre		—N/a	—N/a
October 18, 1985	Albuquerque	United States	Albuquerque Civic Auditorium	Lawyers, Guns and Money	—N/a	—N/a
October 19, 1985	Phoenix	United States	Arizona Veterans Memorial Coliseum		—N/a	—N/a
October 24, 1985	Stillwater	United States	Gallagher Hall	Jason & the Scorchers	—N/a	—N/a
October 26, 1985	Beaumont	United States	Montagne Center	Jason & the Scorchers	1,334 / 7,000	$16,008
October 30, 1985	Memphis	United States	Orpheum Theatre	Jason & the Scorchers	—N/a	—N/a
October 31, 1985	Knoxville	United States	Knoxville Civic Coliseum	Jason & the Scorchers	—N/a	—N/a
November 2, 1985	Miami	United States	James L. Knight Convention Center	The Fabulous Thunderbirds	—N/a	—N/a
November 3, 1985	Orlando	United States	Bob Carr Performing Arts Centre	The Fabulous Thunderbirds	—N/a	—N/a
November 4, 1985	Jacksonville	United States	Jacksonville Civic Auditorium	The Fabulous Thunderbirds	—N/a	—N/a
November 5, 1985	Tampa	United States	Curtis Hixon Hall	The Fabulous Thunderbirds	—N/a	—N/a
November 7, 1985	Atlanta	United States	Fox Theatre	The Fabulous Thunderbirds	4,513 / 4,513	$62,053
November 8, 1985	Fayetteville	United States	Cumberland County Memorial Auditorium	The Fabulous Thunderbirds	—N/a	—N/a
November 9, 1985	Norfolk	United States	The Boathouse	The Fabulous Thunderbirds	—N/a	—N/a
November 10, 1985	Richmond	United States	The Mosque	Terry McNeal	2,381 / 3,667	$32,144
November 12, 1985	Springfield	United States	Springfield Symphony Hall	The Fabulous Thunderbirds	—N/a	—N/a
November 13, 1985	Providence	United States	Providence Performing Arts Center	The Fabulous Thunderbirds	—N/a	—N/a
November 14, 1985	New Haven	United States	Palace Theater	The Fabulous Thunderbirds	—N/a	—N/a
November 15, 1985	Portland	United States	Cumberland County Civic Center	The Fabulous Thunderbirds	—N/a	—N/a
November 17, 1985	Boston	United States	Orpheum Theatre	The Fabulous Thunderbirds	2,800 / 2,800	—N/a
November 18, 1985	Burlington	United States	Burlington Memorial Auditorium	The Fabulous Thunderbirds	—N/a	—N/a
November 19, 1985	Poughkeepsie	United States	Mid-Hudson Civic Center	The Fabulous Thunderbirds	—N/a	—N/a
November 21, 1985	Upper Darby Township	United States	Tower Theater	Shaboo All-Stars	—N/a	—N/a
November 22, 1985	Albany	United States	JB's Theatre	Shaboo All-Stars	—N/a	—N/a
November 23, 1985	Rochester	United States	Auditorium Theatre	The Fabulous Thunderbirds	2,464 / 2,464	$30,800
November 24, 1985	Syracuse	United States	Landmark Theatre	Shaboo All-Stars	—N/a	—N/a
United States
December 6, 1985	Chicago	United States	Aragon Ballroom	Eddy Clearwater	—N/a	—N/a
December 7, 1985	Milwaukee	United States	Oriental Theatre	R&B Cadets	2,074 / 2,200	$30,073
December 8, 1985	Madison	United States	Oscar Mayer Theater	Paul Black and the Flip Kings	2,170 / 2,170	—N/a
December 9, 1985	West Lafayette	United States	Loeb Playhouse	Contact Blues Band	—N/a	—N/a
December 11, 1985	Eau Claire	United States	UW-Eau Claire Arena	J.D. and the Back Alley Madmen	721 / 2,373	$7,502
December 12, 1985	Des Moines	United States	Easy Street	The Jailbreakers	—N/a	—N/a
December 13, 1985	Minneapolis	United States	Orpheum Theatre		—N/a	—N/a
December 15, 1985	Dallas	United States	Fair Park Coliseum	The Fabulous Thunderbirds	—N/a	—N/a
December 16, 1985	Austin	United States	Palmer Auditorium	Omar & the Howlers	—N/a	—N/a
December 31, 1985	San Antonio	United States	HemisFair Arena	The Fabulous Thunderbirds, Joe King Carrasco and the Crowns	—N/a	—N/a
United States
January 23, 1986	Utica	United States	Stanley Theater	The Fabulous Thunderbirds	—N/a	—N/a
January 24, 1986	Pittsburgh	United States	Syria Mosque	The Fabulous Thunderbirds	3,774 / 3,774	$48,119
January 25, 1986	Charlottesville	United States	University Hall	The Fabulous Thunderbirds	—N/a	—N/a
January 27, 1986	Athens	United States	Georgia Coliseum	The Fabulous Thunderbirds	—N/a	—N/a
January 28, 1986	Nashville	United States	Grand Ole Opry House	The Fabulous Thunderbirds	4,425 / 4,425	$60,445
January 29, 1986	Birmingham	United States	Boutwell Auditorium	The Fabulous Thunderbirds	—N/a	—N/a
January 30, 1986	Jackson	United States	Jackson Municipal Auditorium	The Fabulous Thunderbirds	—N/a	—N/a
February 1, 1986	Houston	United States	Sam Houston Coliseum	The Fabulous Thunderbirds	—N/a	—N/a
February 4, 1986	Fort Worth	United States	Will Rogers Auditorium	The Fabulous Thunderbirds	2,964 / 2,964	$48,906
February 5, 1986	Fort Worth	United States	Will Rogers Auditorium	The Fabulous Thunderbirds	2,964 / 2,964	$48,906
February 7, 1986	St. Louis	United States	Kiel Opera House	The Fabulous Thunderbirds	—N/a	—N/a
February 8, 1986	Kansas City	United States	Kansas City Memorial Hall	The Fabulous Thunderbirds	3,314 / 3,314	$40,703
February 9, 1986	Omaha	United States	Omaha Music Hall	The Fabulous Thunderbirds	2,608 / 2,608	$37,164
February 11, 1986	Athens	United States	Alumni Memorial Auditorium	The Fabulous Thunderbirds	—N/a	—N/a
February 12, 1986	Royal Oak	United States	Royal Oak Music Theatre	The Fabulous Thunderbirds	4,953 / 4,953	$79,248
February 13, 1986	Royal Oak	United States	Royal Oak Music Theatre	The Fabulous Thunderbirds	4,953 / 4,953	$79,248
February 14, 1986	Royal Oak	United States	Royal Oak Music Theatre	The Fabulous Thunderbirds	4,953 / 4,953	$79,248
February 16, 1986	Bloomington	United States	Indiana University Auditorium	The Fabulous Thunderbirds	—N/a	—N/a
February 18, 1986	Champaign	United States	Virginia Theatre	The Fabulous Thunderbirds	—N/a	—N/a
February 19, 1986	Merrillville	United States	Holiday Star Theatre	The Fabulous Thunderbirds, René Martinez	—N/a	—N/a
February 20, 1986	Royal Oak	United States	Royal Oak Music Theatre	The Fabulous Thunderbirds	4,953 / 4,953	$79,248
February 21, 1986	Royal Oak	United States	Royal Oak Music Theatre	The Fabulous Thunderbirds	4,953 / 4,953	$79,248
February 22, 1986	Royal Oak	United States	Royal Oak Music Theatre	Walk the West	4,953 / 4,953	$79,248
March 2, 1986	Honolulu	United States	Blaisdell Arena	The Fabulous Thunderbirds	—N/a	—N/a
Australasia
March 6, 1986	Auckland	New Zealand	Logan Campbell Centre	The Fabulous Thunderbirds, René Martinez	—N/a	—N/a
March 8, 1986	Palmerston North	New Zealand	Arena Manawatu	The Fabulous Thunderbirds, René Martinez	—N/a	—N/a
March 10, 1986	Dunedin	New Zealand	Dunedin Town Hall	The Fabulous Thunderbirds, René Martinez	—N/a	—N/a
March 11, 1986	Christchurch	New Zealand	Christchurch Town Hall	The Fabulous Thunderbirds, René Martinez	—N/a	—N/a
March 12, 1986	Wellington	New Zealand	Wellington Town Hall	The Fabulous Thunderbirds, René Martinez	—N/a	—N/a
March 13, 1986	Wellington	New Zealand	Wellington Town Hall	The Fabulous Thunderbirds, René Martinez	—N/a	—N/a
March 14, 1986	Auckland	New Zealand	Auckland Town Hall	The Fabulous Thunderbirds, René Martinez	—N/a	—N/a
March 16, 1986	Sydney	Australia	Hordern Pavilion	The Fabulous Thunderbirds, Weddings Parties Anything	—N/a	—N/a
March 17, 1986	Sydney	Australia	Hordern Pavilion	The Fabulous Thunderbirds, Weddings Parties Anything	—N/a	—N/a
March 19, 1986	Brisbane	Australia	Brisbane Festival Hall	The Fabulous Thunderbirds, René Martinez	—N/a	—N/a
March 20, 1986	Brisbane	Australia	Brisbane Festival Hall	The Fabulous Thunderbirds, René Martinez	—N/a	—N/a
March 22, 1986	Melbourne	Australia	Melbourne Festival Hall	The Fabulous Thunderbirds, Weddings Parties Anything	—N/a	—N/a
March 23, 1986	Melbourne	Australia	Melbourne Festival Hall	The Fabulous Thunderbirds, Weddings Parties Anything	—N/a	—N/a
March 24, 1986	Adelaide	Australia	Thebarton Theatre	The Fabulous Thunderbirds, René Martinez	—N/a	—N/a
March 25, 1986	Adelaide	Australia	Thebarton Theatre	The Fabulous Thunderbirds, René Martinez	—N/a	—N/a
March 27, 1986	Perth	Australia	Perth Concert Hall	The Fabulous Thunderbirds, René Martinez	—N/a	—N/a
March 29, 1986	Perth	Australia	Perth Concert Hall	The Fabulous Thunderbirds, René Martinez	—N/a	—N/a
United States
April 13, 1986	Montclair	United States	Panzer Gymnasium	Shaboo All-Stars	—N/a	—N/a
April 15, 1986	Piscataway	United States	Livingston Gymnasium	Shaboo All-Stars	—N/a	—N/a
April 16, 1986	Amherst	United States	Fine Arts Center	Shaboo All-Stars	—N/a	—N/a
April 18, 1986	Ithaca	United States	Bailey Hall	Shaboo All-Stars	—N/a	—N/a
April 19, 1986	Oneonta	United States	SUNY Oneonta	Shaboo All-Stars	—N/a	—N/a
April 20, 1986	West Long Beach	United States	Alumni Memorial Gymnasium	Shaboo All-Stars	—N/a	—N/a
April 22, 1986	Springfield	United States	Prairie Capital Convention Center	The Fabulous Thunderbirds	1,942 / 8,420	$26,217
April 23, 1986	Cedar Rapids	United States	Paramount Theatre	Lonnie Brooks	1,913 / 1,913	—N/a
April 25, 1986	Norman	United States	Lloyd Noble Center	Edgar Winter	—N/a	—N/a
April 26, 1986	Tulsa	United States	Brady Theater	Edgar Winter	—N/a	—N/a
April 27, 1986	Monroe	United States	Ewing Coliseum	The Producers	—N/a	—N/a
May 3, 1986	New Orleans	United States	Fair Grounds Race Course	Will Soto, Dave Bartholomew	—N/a	—N/a
May 25, 1986	Liverpool	United States	Long Branch Park	The Band, Pure Prairie League	—N/a	—N/a
June 7, 1986	Wichita Falls	United States	Lucy Park	Red River Lyric Theater, Take To	—N/a	—N/a
North America
June 20, 1986	Hoffman Estates	United States	Poplar Creek Music Theatre	The Fabulous Thunderbirds	—N/a	—N/a
June 21, 1986	Indianapolis	United States	Indianapolis Sports Center	The Fabulous Thunderbirds	—N/a	—N/a
June 22, 1986	Ionia	United States	Ionia Fairgrounds	The Fabulous Thunderbirds	—N/a	—N/a
June 23, 1986	Cincinnati	United States	Riverbend Music Center	The Fabulous Thunderbirds	7,387 / 16,289	—N/a
June 24, 1986	Cuyahoga Falls	United States	Blossom Music Center	The Fabulous Thunderbirds	—N/a	—N/a
June 26, 1986	New York City	United States	Pier 84	The Fabulous Thunderbirds	—N/a	—N/a
June 27, 1986	Columbia	United States	Merriweather Post Pavilion	The Fabulous Thunderbirds	—N/a	—N/a
June 28, 1986	Philadelphia	United States	Mann Music Center	The Fabulous Thunderbirds, Roy Buchanan	—N/a	—N/a
June 29, 1986	McCreary	Canada	Beaver Dam Lake	John Anderson, Eddy Raven	—N/a	—N/a
July 2, 1986	Milwaukee	United States	Summerfest Grounds	The Fabulous Thunderbirds	22,500 / 22,500	—N/a
July 4, 1986	Manor	United States	Manor Downs	Delbert McClinton, John Conlee	40,500 / 40,500	$810,000
July 9, 1986	Toronto	Canada	Kingswood Music Theatre	Johnnie Lovesin	—N/a	—N/a
July 11, 1986	Saint Paul	United States	Harriet Island Regional Park	The Blasters	—N/a	—N/a
July 17, 1986	Austin	United States	Austin Opera House		2,000 / 2,000	—N/a
July 18, 1986	Austin	United States	Austin Opera House		2,000 / 2,000	—N/a
July 19, 1986	Dallas	United States	Park Central Amphitheater	René Martinez	—N/a	—N/a
July 20, 1986	Mansfield	United States	Great Woods Center for the Performing Arts	James Cotton Blues Band, Roy Buchanan	—N/a	—N/a
July 22, 1986	Bonner Springs	United States	Sandstone Center for the Performing Arts	Bonnie Raitt	—N/a	—N/a
July 24, 1986	Morrison	United States	Red Rocks Amphitheatre	Bonnie Raitt, Taj Mahal	8,897 / 8,897	$137,513
July 27, 1986	Los Angeles	United States	Greek Theatre	Bonnie Raitt	6,187 / 6,187	—N/a
July 29, 1986	Tucson	United States	Tucson Music Hall	René Martinez	—N/a	—N/a
July 31, 1986	San Diego	United States	SDSU Open Air Theatre	Bonnie Raitt	—N/a	—N/a
August 2, 1986	Sacramento	United States	Sacramento Community Center Theater	Bonnie Raitt	—N/a	—N/a
August 3, 1986	Concord	United States	Concord Pavilion	Bonnie Raitt	8,350 / 8,350	$127,763
August 4, 1986	Santa Cruz	United States	Santa Cruz Civic Auditorium	René Martinez	1,964 / 1,964	—N/a
August 6, 1986	Salem	United States	Oregon State Penitentiary		—N/a	—N/a
August 7, 1986	Eugene	United States	Cuthbert Amphitheater	Bonnie Raitt, Robert Cray Band	—N/a	—N/a
August 8, 1986	Portland	United States	Portland Civic Auditorium	Bonnie Raitt	—N/a	—N/a
August 9, 1986	Spokane	United States	Spokane Opera House	Bonnie Raitt	—N/a	—N/a
August 10, 1986	Seattle	United States	Paramount Theatre	Bonnie Raitt	—N/a	—N/a
August 11, 1986	Vancouver	Canada	Expo Theatre	Bonnie Raitt	—N/a	—N/a
August 23, 1986	Syracuse	United States	New York State Fair Grandstand	René Martinez	—N/a	—N/a
August 24, 1986	Saratoga Springs	United States	Saratoga Performing Arts Center	René Martinez	—N/a	—N/a
August 26, 1986	Memphis	United States	Orpheum Theatre	Marshall Chapman	—N/a	—N/a
August 29, 1986	Montreal	Canada	Parc Jarry	Frank Marino & Mahogany Rush, Southside Johnny and the Asbury Jukes	12,035 / 40,000	$132,385
Europe
September 12, 1986	Copenhagen	Denmark	Saga Cinema	René Martinez	—N/a	—N/a
September 14, 1986	Hamburg	West Germany	Große Freiheit 36	René Martinez	—N/a	—N/a
September 15, 1986	Berlin	West Germany	Metropol	René Martinez	—N/a	—N/a
September 16, 1986	Offenbach am Main	West Germany	Stadthalle	René Martinez	—N/a	—N/a
September 17, 1986	Essen	West Germany	Saalbau	René Martinez	—N/a	—N/a
September 18, 1986	Bonn	West Germany	Biskuithalle	René Martinez	—N/a	—N/a
September 19, 1986	Kerkrade	Netherlands	Rodahal	René Martinez	—N/a	—N/a
September 20, 1986	Deinze	Belgium	Brielpoort	René Martinez	—N/a	—N/a
September 21, 1986	Utrecht	Netherlands	Muziekcentrum Vredenburg	René Martinez	—N/a	—N/a
September 23, 1986	Paris	France	Paris Olympia	René Martinez	—N/a	—N/a
September 24, 1986	Paris	France	Paris Olympia	René Martinez	—N/a	—N/a
September 25, 1986	Sindelfingen	West Germany	Stadthalle	René Martinez	—N/a	—N/a
September 26, 1986	Munich	West Germany	Circus Krone Building	René Martinez	—N/a	—N/a
September 28, 1986	Ludwigshafen	West Germany	Pfalzbau	René Martinez	—N/a	—N/a
September 29, 1986	Zürich	Switzerland	Volkshaus	René Martinez	—N/a	—N/a
October 2, 1986	London	England	Hammersmith Palais	Electric Bluebirds	—N/a	—N/a
~~October 4, 1986~~	Doetinchem	Netherlands	Markthal	—N/a	—N/a	—N/a
~~October 5, 1986~~	Amsterdam	Netherlands	Haarlem	—N/a	—N/a	—N/a
~~October 6, 1986~~	Helsinki	Finland	Kulturehuset	—N/a	—N/a	—N/a
~~October 8, 1986~~	Örebro	Sweden	Park Teatern	—N/a	—N/a	—N/a
~~October 9, 1986~~	Lund	Sweden	Akademiska föreningen	—N/a	—N/a	—N/a
~~October 10, 1986~~	Stockholm	Sweden	Gröna Lund	—N/a	—N/a	—N/a
~~October 12, 1986~~	Bergen	Norway	Olena	—N/a	—N/a	—N/a
~~October 13, 1986~~	Stavanger	Norway	De Rode Sjohus	—N/a	—N/a	—N/a
~~October 14, 1986~~	Oslo	Norway	Circus	—N/a	—N/a	—N/a
~~October 16, 1986~~	London	England	Hammersmith Palais	—N/a	—N/a	—N/a
~~October 17, 1986~~	Newcastle	England	Mayfair Ballroom	—N/a	—N/a	—N/a
~~October 18, 1986~~	Manchester	England	Manchester Apollo	—N/a	—N/a	—N/a
~~October 20, 1986~~	Dublin	Ireland	National Stadium	—N/a	—N/a	—N/a

== See also ==
- Stevie Ray Vaughan
- Soul to Soul
