= Iowa Audubon Society =

Non-profit Organization in Waterloo, Lowa

- Type: Non-profit organization
- Legal status: 501(c)(3)
- Headquarters: Waterloo, Iowa
- Region served: Illinois
- President: Doug Harr
- Main organ: Board of Directors

The Iowa Audubon Society is a nonprofit organization based in Waterloo, Iowa. Its mission statement states that the Society's goal is to "identify, protect and restore Iowa’s bird habitats, to educate Iowa’s citizens toward a greater level of conservation awareness, and to promote enjoyment and greater pride in Iowa’s natural ecosystems, birds, [and] other wildlife."

== Description ==
The Iowa Audubon Society leads the understanding and celebration of Iowa birds, especially the birds that visit the Important Bird Areas (IBAs) that are landmark biomes. The Iowa Audubon Society's Technical Committee works to enhance scientific identification of these IBAs, and their avian visitors, so that these sites and their ecosystems can be preserved. This includes ongoing partnerships with the United States Army Corps of Engineers, the Iowa Department of Natural Resources, and other groups that own or have custody over Iowa bird resources.

The Iowa Audubon Society works with partner organizations, including Pheasants Forever, and with communities across Iowa to foster bird enjoyment and environmental understanding. As of May 2023, ten counties (including Audubon County, Iowa) and eleven municipalities have been named “Bird Friendly Iowa” communities.
