= Pheasants Forever =

American nonprofit organization

- Founded: 1982
- Founder: Dennis Anderson
- Type: Habitat conservation and hunting
- Location: Saint Paul, Minnesota
- Region served: North America
- Members: 150,000
- Key people: Matthew J. Kucharski, chair Marilyn Vetter, president and CEO
- Website: www.pheasantsforever.org

Pheasants Forever, Inc. (PF), a 501(c)(3) non-profit conservation organization, is dedicated to conserving wildlife habitat suitable for pheasants. Formed in 1982 as a response to the continuing decline of upland wildlife and habitat throughout the United States, Pheasants Forever, and its quail conservation division, Quail Forever, have a combined membership of approximately 150,000 throughout North America.

== History ==
Pheasants Forever began in Saint Paul, Minnesota, in 1982 as a response to the decline of pheasant numbers in the state, the result of substantial losses of habitat suitable for pheasants as farming practices intensified. Pheasants Forever was created to return those grassland acres to wildlife habitat.

Dennis Anderson, outdoor editor for the St. Paul Pioneer Press and Dispatch, wrote an article on March 7, 1982, regarding the state of grassland habitat in Minnesota. After the article appeared, Anderson received over 100 written responses and 50 phone calls, voicing concerns for the state of the upland it has a lot of birds during mating season habitat and the state's upland game birds. It was from this article that the concept of Pheasants Forever was formed and, shortly after, Anderson and some friends established Pheasants Forever.

The first Pheasants Forever banquet was held on April 15, 1983, at the former Prom Center on University Avenue in St. Paul. Over 800 people attended, including famed waterfowler and outdoors writer Jimmy Robinson, who presented two $1,000 checks to the organization, one from him and one from Robert Naegele Sr.

The keynote speaker at the inaugural Pheasants Forever banquet was the governor of Minnesota, Rudy Perpich, who later signed the state's first pheasant stamp bill. As of 2008, the state pheasant stamp has raised over $14.6 million for pheasant habitat and development on private and public lands, and for public land acquisition. The stamp costs $7.50 and it is required of pheasant hunters age 18 and older.

=== Membership growth ===
- 1983: 1,000 members
- 1984: 3,000 members
- 1985: 6,000 members
- 1986: 12,000 members
- 1987: 25,000 members
- 1988: 34,250 members
- 1989: 46,000 members
- 1999: 60,000 members

== Organization ==
Pheasants Forever uses a grassroots system of fundraising and project development that allows members to see the direct result of their contributions. This is accomplished through Pheasants Forever and Quail Forever local chapters determining how 100% of their locally raised funds will be spent. Pheasants Forever and Quail Forever have a combined 700 local chapters throughout the United States and Canada.

== Organizational projects ==
Pheasants Forever and Quail Forever have chapters in 40 states, members in all other states and chapters in their sister organization, Pheasants Forever Canada. The organization participates in habitat projects on local and national levels, and has an average annual completion of 20,000+ habitat projects. Pheasants Forever wildlife habitat projects have been completed in conjunction with local, state and federal natural resource agencies, and all of those projects have subsequently been opened to public hunting or compatible outdoor recreational use.

Since 1982, Pheasants Forever and Quail Forever have enhanced over 6,100,000 acres (25,000 km^{2})—including planting grasslands, restoring wetlands, planting woody cover or food plots and purchased lands to provide habitat for pheasant, quail and other wildlife. This total also includes approximately 400,000 wildlife habitat projects, which have helped pheasant, quail and other wildlife.

Pheasants Forever and Quail Forever chapters hold more than 500 youth events per annum, with 25,000 plus youth to the outdoors. Many of the organizations' chapters provide educators with scholarships to attend Leopold Education Project workshops (named after the environmentalist writer, Aldo Leopold). The educators facilitate youth mentor hunts, outdoor conservation days, shooting sports, competitive events, conservation camps, and youth fishing tournaments, outdoor expos, hunter education classes, schoolyard habitats and much more.

The No Child Left Indoors initiative builds on Pheasants Forever and Quail Forever's Leopold Education Project and chapter youth events with youth and family programs. The No Child Left Indoors initiative is carried out through youth habitat projects, youth and family community events and youth outdoor education programs hosted by chapters and volunteers across the country.

The grassroots conservation campaign was formed by the organization with the goal of raising $25 million in planned gifts, estate, bequests and other donations. The objective of the campaign is to accelerate the organization's ability to conserve and enhance North America/North America's wildlife resources as well as Americans' hunting traditions.

=== Statistics ===
- Minnesota's conservation groups
1. Ducks Unlimited, 42,000
2. National Wild Turkey Federation, 26,000
3. Pheasants Forever, 22,500
4. Minnesota Deer Hunters Association, 20,000
5. Minnesota Waterfowl Association
- Top five states for Pheasants Forever members
1. Minnesota, 23,800
2. Iowa, 18,900
3. Nebraska, 10,300
4. Michigan, 7,900
5. Illinois and Wisconsin, 7,500
