= McAlister Auditorium =

Unique historic building located on the campus of Tulane University in New Orleans

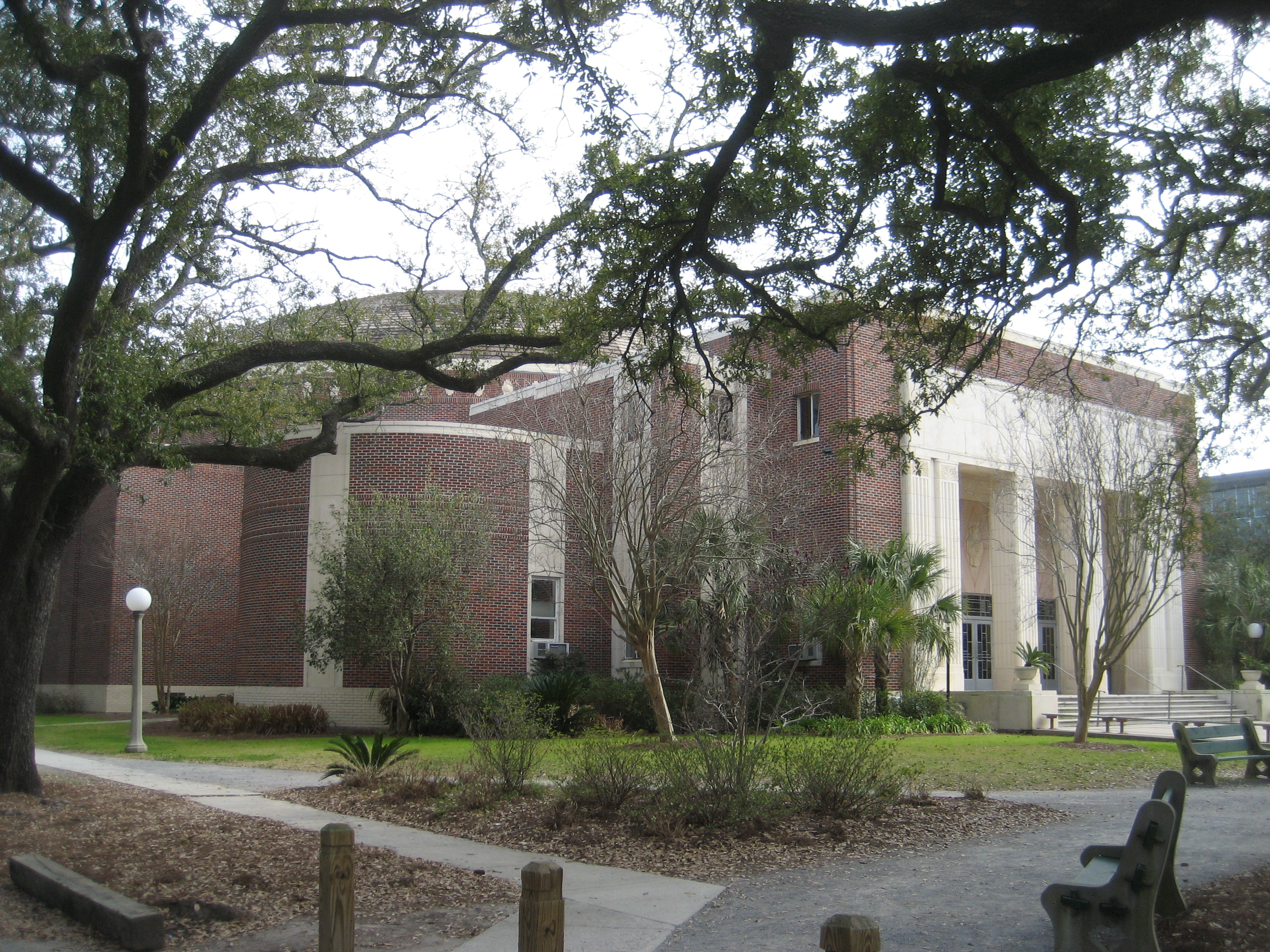
Main entrance (2010).

McAlister Auditorium is an event space located on Tulane University's Uptown Campus. It has been used for a variety of events on campus including academic ceremonies, lectures, & concerts.

== Building description ==
The Society of Architectural Historians described the building as "a Moderne version of the Roman Pantheon, with a saucer-shaped, self-supporting dome of reinforced concrete, 110 feet in diameter, and inscribed pilasters framing the triple-door entrance, representing a kind of classical portico rendered in shallow relief."

== History ==
The building was constructed in 1940 through a bequest from the estate of Amelie McAlister Upshur in honor of her mother, Armantine Reynaud McAlister. Constructed by Favrot and Reed, the building was said to be "the world's largest self-suspended concrete dome" at the time of its completion.

=== Removal of the "Victory Bell" ===
In 2020, Tulane University removed what was then known as "the McAlister Victory Bell" from its pedestal in front of the building. This occurred after university officials were made aware of the bell's historical usage as part of the task-system used to control the labor of enslaved workers on a plantation. As of mid-2021, the pedestal had also been removed.
