= Prom Ballroom =

Former dance hall in St. Paul, Minnesota

Coordinates: 44°57′19″N 93°9′1″W

- Interactive map of Prom Ballroom
- Address: 1190 University Avenue West
- Location: Saint Paul, Minnesota
- Capacity: 2,000

Construction
- Opened: 1941
- Demolished: 1987

The Prom Ballroom was a dance hall in Saint Paul, Minnesota, United States.

== History ==
The Prom Ballroom opened in 1941 with a performance by Glenn Miller.

The club played a diverse array of acts, ranging from rock to polka and jazz, and included acts like Count Basie and Lawrence Welk. The house orchestra was called the Jules Herman Orchestra. It was considered one of the most prestigious clubs in the Midwest.

Performers at the venue included Bobby Vee, The Trashmen, The Beach Boys, and the Everly Brothers. It was also one of the most important venues for the burgeoning rock-music scene in Minnesota in the 1950s and 1960s.

The ballroom was one of the final stops (January 28, 1959) on the infamous, ill-fated "Winter Dance Party", the Buddy Holly-led tour which ended in the plane crash that killed Holly, The Big Bopper and Ritchie Valens. The performance drew an overcapacity crowd of more than 2,000 people.

Prince celebrated his 27th birthday at the Prom with a masquerade party and live concert; he and the Revolution had been scheduled to play songs from his then-new album Around the World in a Day, but instead played a selection of as-yet-unreleased songs including "Sometimes It Snows in April."

It was torn down in 1987.
