= The Chance =

Coordinates: 41.703162°N 73.924469°W

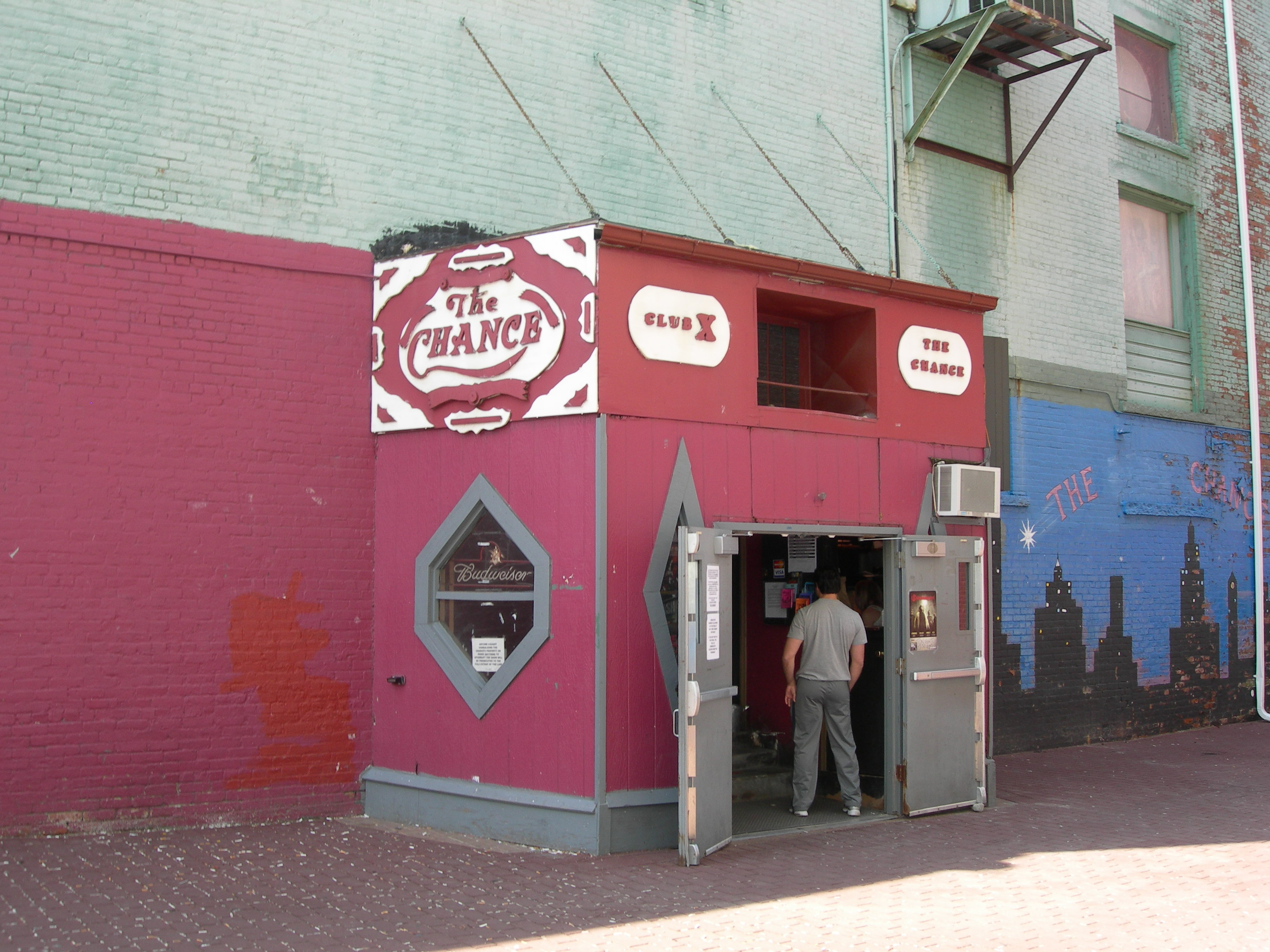
- Main entrance to the venue (c. 2008)
- Interactive map of The Chance
- Former names: Dutchess Theatre (1912–26); Carroll Players Playhouse (1926–28); Playhouse Theatre (1928–30); Community Theater (1930–33); New Playhouse Theatre (1933–35); Astor Theater (1935–40); Starlight Theater (1940–45); Frivolous Sal's Last Chance Saloon (1970–77); The Chance (1980–present)
- Address: 6 Crannell St; Poughkeepsie, NY 12601-3306
- Location: Downtown Poughkeepsie
- Owner: Chai Developers
- Capacity: 900

Construction
- Opened: July 23, 1912
- Closed: 1945–70; 1977–80

The Chance is a concert and theater complex located in downtown Poughkeepsie, New York. The complex consists of four rooms: the Chance Theater, which is the primary concert hall; The Loft, a smaller upstairs concert hall; The Platinum Lounge, a downstairs bar-nightclub; and The Nuddy Irishmen, a downstairs cafe-bar.

== History ==
The theater opened in 1912 under the name the "Carroll Players Playhouse", and in 1928, changed its name to the "Playhouse Theatre". It primarily featured older silent films in its early days. The theater closed in 1945, but reopened once more in 1970 when Larry Plover turned the film stages into a music venue named Frivolous Sal's Last Chance Saloon. It was also closed from 1977 through 1980, finally changing its name to The Chance. The theater is owned by Frank Pallett, who purchased the venue in 1994.

The theater has held no events since October 29, 2023.
