= Fabrik (Hamburg) =

Coordinates: 53°33′23.7″N 9°55′45.2″E

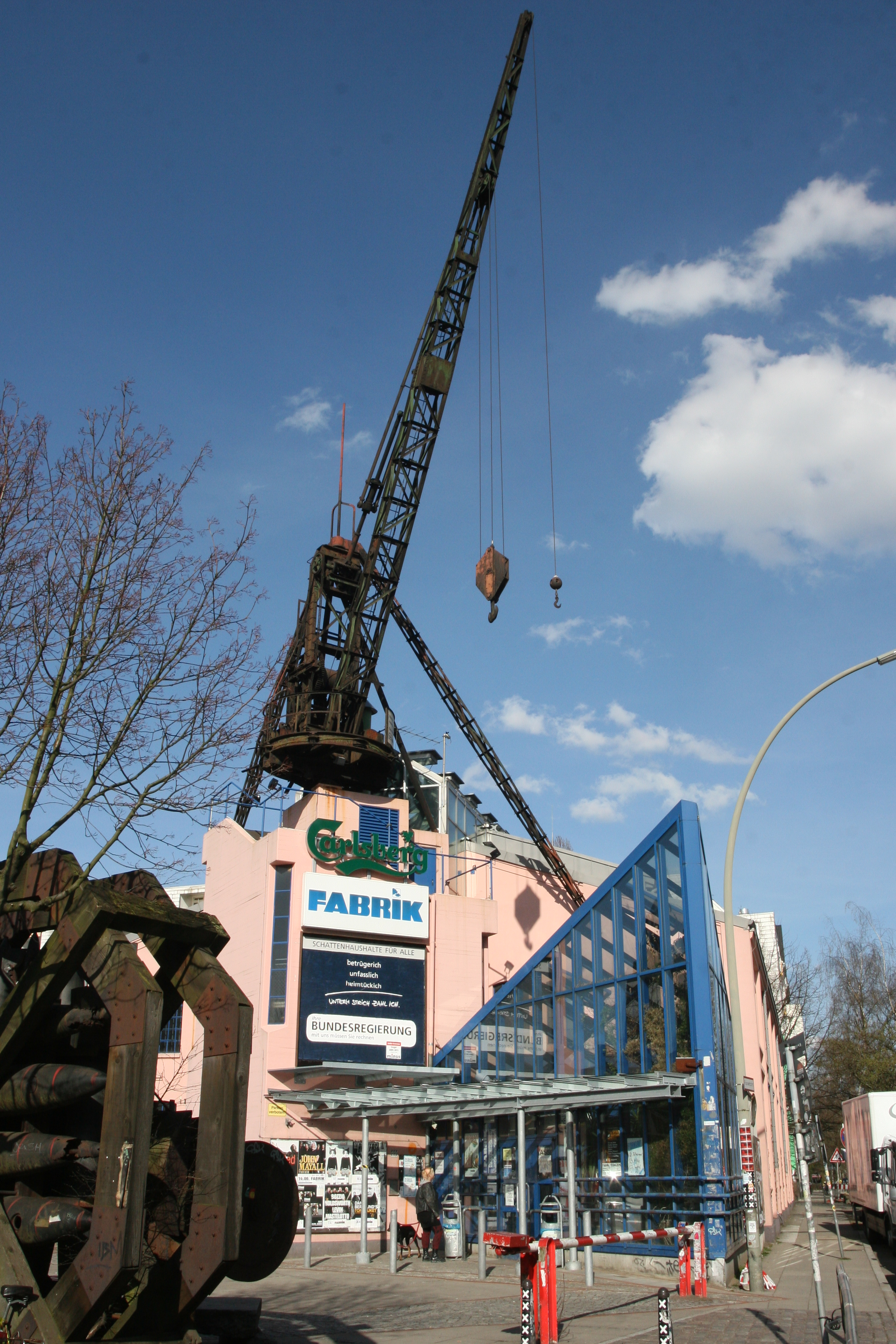
The Fabrik in April 2010.

The Fabrik (English: "Factory") is a cultural centre in Hamburg, Germany.

It occupies a former machine parts factory in Ottensen, in the Altona district. The building dates from the Gründerzeit (around 1840), and consists of a large, nave-like central hall with wooden girders, overlooked by running galleries on the two upper floors. An old crane still hangs over the entrance as a memorial to the building's industrial past.

The Fabrik was founded in 1971 by the painter Horst Dietrich and the architect Friedhelm Zeuner. Dietrich, who died in 2014, was the director until 2012. He was awarded the 1993 Max Brauer Prize, given by the Alfred Toepfer Foundation. Zeuner received the senate of Hamburg's architecture prize for the renovation, The Fabrik burned down in 1977, but was rebuilt as before in 1979.

Today the Fabrik hosts activities for young people, together with teaching events, lectures, debates, exhibitions, theatre productions and concerts. Many prominent musicians have played there, including B.B. King, Miles Davis, Meat Loaf and Nirvana.

The Fabrik is funded partly by its own takings and partly by the city of Hamburg.
