= Manor Downs =

Horse racetrack in Manor, Texas

Coordinates: 30.36074°N 97.577713°W

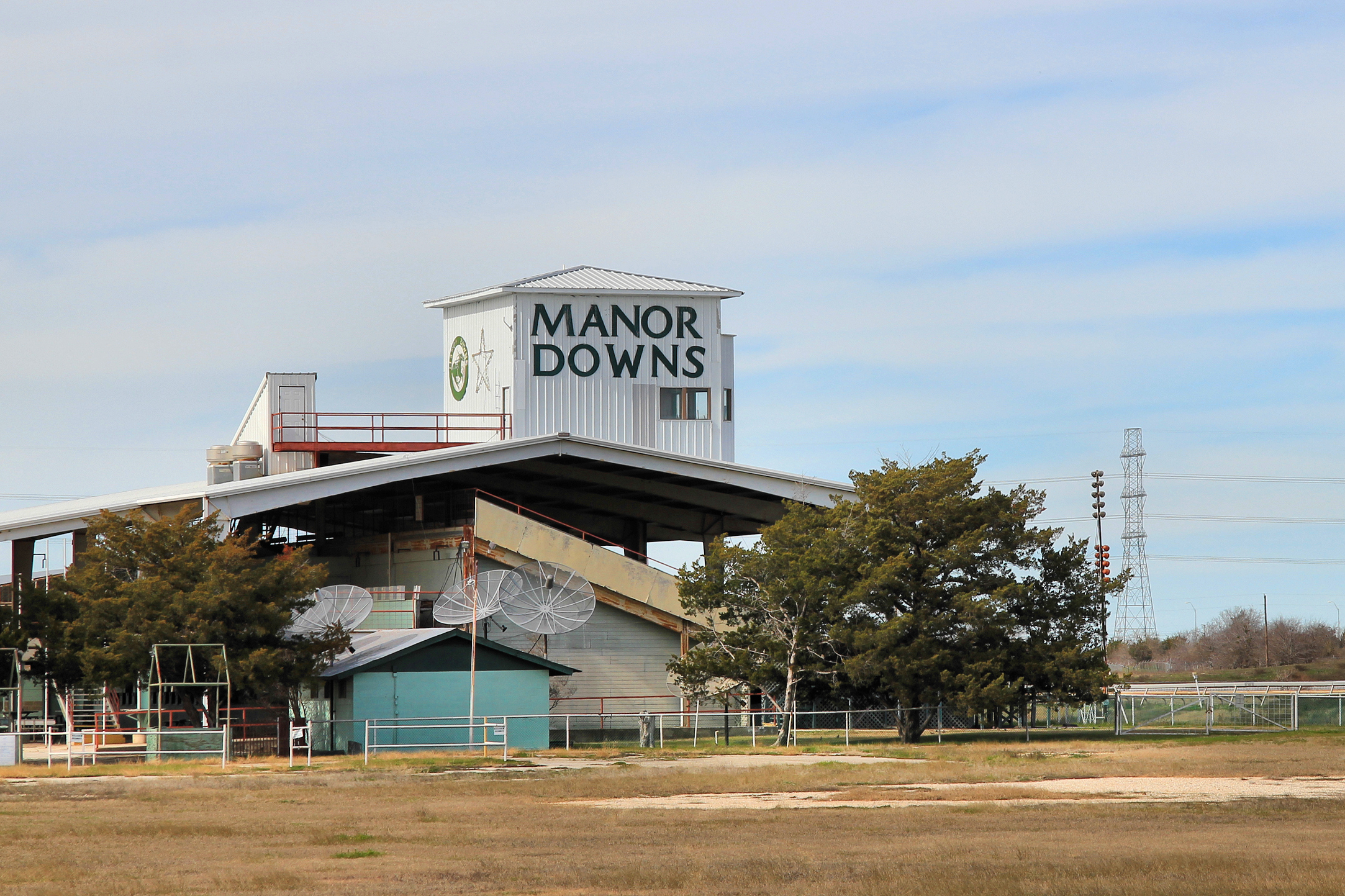
- Interactive map of Manor Downs
- Location: Travis County, near Manor, Texas

Manor Downs was a horse racetrack located outside Manor, Texas, United States. It was Texas' oldest pari-mutuel horse racetrack. Live racing in the spring featured both quarter horse and thoroughbred racing. Simulcast racing was also available.

Frances Carr and Sam Cutler began development of Manor Downs in 1975 on 44 acres (180,000 m^{2}) of land that had an old horse race track on it. They initially planned for Manor Downs to be a horse-training stable and fairground facility.

Manor Downs originally hosted just quarter-horse racing; but when pari-mutuel betting was legalized, the track was later upgraded for thoroughbred racing in order to qualify for a pari-mutuel license.

Manor Downs was licensed as a class 2 racetrack in Texas. A class 2 racetrack is a racetrack on which racing is conducted for no more than 44 days in a calendar year.

Manor Downs has also been the site for concerts through the years including Farm Aid 2 (July 4, 1986), Blondie, and five shows by the Grateful Dead.

As horse racing's popularity waned with the slow economy of the Great Recession, Manor Downs ceased operations in late July 2010 rather than continue losing money.

== Racing ==
The following graded stakes were run at Manor Downs:

- Grade I Manor Downs Futurity $300,000
- Grade II Longhorn Futurity $200,000
- Grade II Manor Downs Derby $145,540
- Grade III Longhorn Derby $121,560
