= Gojira discography =

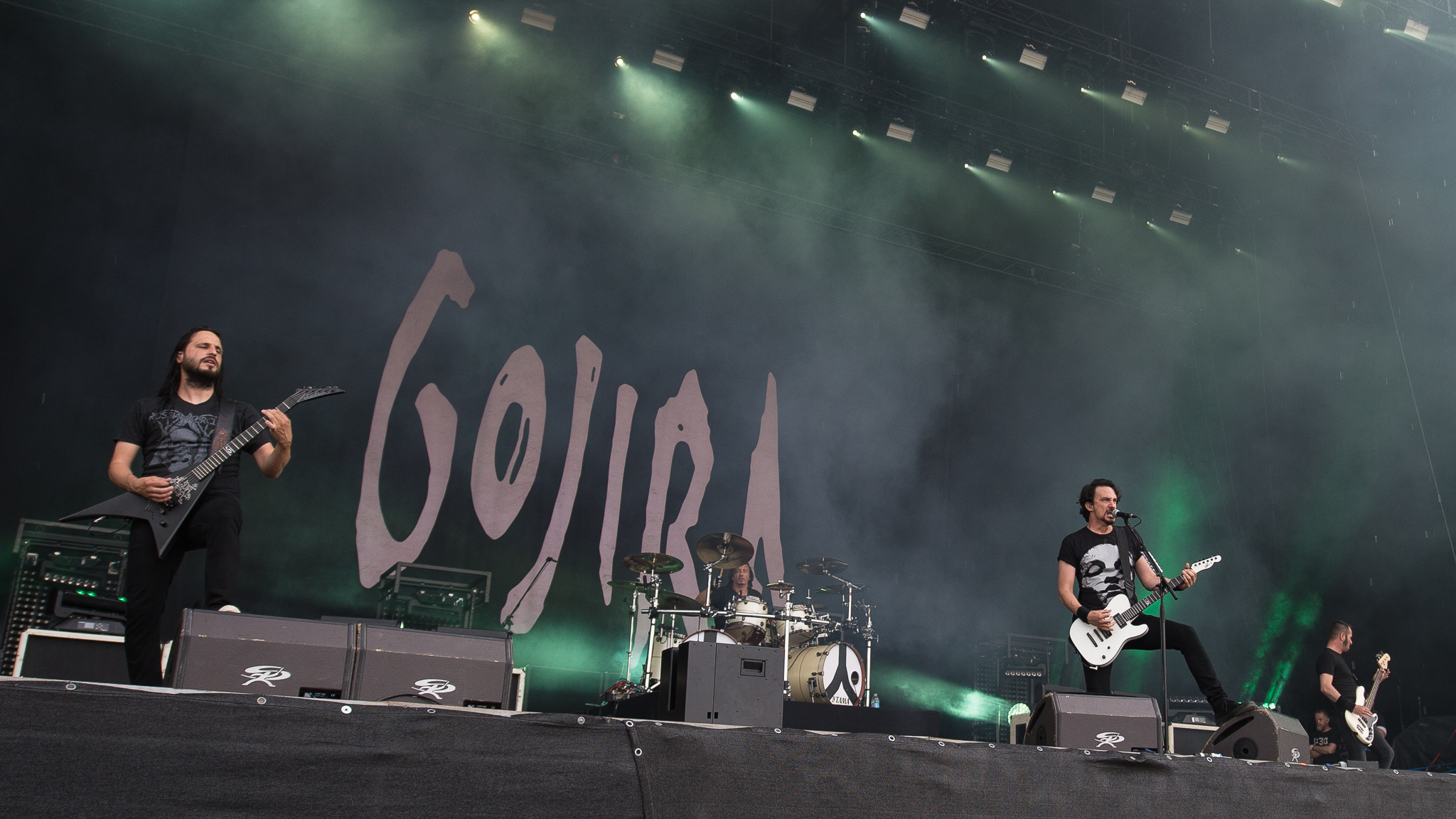
- Gojira performing at Rock im Park in Germany in 2017
- Studio albums: 7
- Extended plays: 1
- Live albums: 3
- Singles: 11
- Video albums: 3
- Music videos: 17
- Demo albums: 4
- Film score albums: 1

The discography of Gojira, a French heavy metal band, consists of seven studio albums, three live albums, one film score album (live), four demo albums, one extended play, ten singles, seventeen music videos, and three video albums.

Gojira was formed in 1996 under the name Godzilla by guitarist Joe Duplantier, his brother, drummer Mario Duplantier, guitarist Christian Andreu, and bassist Alexandre Cornillon. Jean-Michel Labadie replaced Cornillon in 1998. Godzilla released a series of demos from 1996 to 2000.

The band changed their name to Gojira for legal reasons in 2001, and released their first full-length album, Terra Incognita, in March 2001 through Gabriel Editions (themselves). Gojira then signed with Boycott Records for their second studio album, The Link, in April 2003, and their first live DVD, The Link Alive, in 2004, which was also released as a live album.

In September 2005, Gojira released their third album, From Mars to Sirius through Mon Slip, which was later released worldwide via Prosthetic Records. From Mars to Sirius was Gojira's first album to appear on any country's record chart, debuting at No. 44 in France. It remained on the chart for three weeks. After extensive world touring, the band released their fourth album The Way of All Flesh in October 2008, which debuted and peaked at No. 138 on the Billboard 200 chart in the United States, No. 25 in Finland and No. 28 in France.

Gojira signed to Roadrunner Records in 2011 and released their fifth album L'Enfant Sauvage, in June 2012, alongside their second live album/DVD/Blu-ray, The Flesh Alive. L'Enfant Sauvage reached No. 34 on the Billboard 200 chart and entered the Top 40 albums chart in six European countries. In 2014, the band released a live CD/DVD titled, Les Enfants Sauvages. Gojira's sixth studio album, Magma, was released in June 2016. The album debuted at No. 24 on the US Billboard 200 chart and topped the Billboard Hard Rock Albums chart for one week. The album landed in the Top 40 albums chart in twelve European countries. Within eight months, Magma reached the bar of 400,000 albums sold worldwide.

The band's seventh studio album, Fortitude, was released in April 2021 under Roadrunner, and increased Magma's sales and chart positions. The album entered the US Billboard 200 chart at No. 12 and landed the top spot on Billboard's Top Album Sales chart, leading nine new releases. It topped the Billboard Top Rock Albums chart and Hard Rock Albums chart (for a second time after Magma). In terms of pure album sales, Fortitude was the best-selling album in the United States during its first week of release.

== Albums ==
=== Studio albums ===
List of studio albums, with selected chart positions
Title	Album details	Peak chart positions											Certifications
Title	Album details	FRA	AUS	AUT	CAN	FIN	GER	NOR	SWE	SWI	UK	US	Certifications
Terra Incognita	Released: 19 March 2001; Label: Gabriel	—	—	—	—	—	—	—	—	—	—	—	
The Link	Released: 18 April 2003; Label: Boycott	—	—	—	—	—	—	—	—	—	—	—	
From Mars to Sirius	Released: 27 September 2005; Label: Listenable	44	—	—	—	—	—	—	—	—	—	—	
The Way of All Flesh	Released: 13 October 2008; Label: Listenable	28	—	—	—	25	—	—	—	—	124	138	
L'Enfant Sauvage	Released: 26 June 2012; Label: Roadrunner	7	47	64	—	11	44	12	28	23	53	34	SNEP: Gold
Magma	Released: 17 June 2016; Label: Roadrunner	10	11	9	17	5	14	9	26	4	24	24	SNEP: Gold
Fortitude	Released: 30 April 2021; Label: Roadrunner	2	3	3	15	2	8	10	13	4	6	12	SNEP: Gold
"—" denotes a recording that did not chart or was not released in that territory.

=== Live albums ===
List of live albums, with selected chart positions
Title	Album details	Peak chart positions
Title	Album details	FRA
The Link Alive	Released: 16 April 2004; Label: Boycott	174
The Flesh Alive	Released: 6 June 2012; Label: Mascot	76
Les Enfants Sauvages	Released: 11 March 2014; Label: Roadrunner	—

=== Film score albums ===
List of score albums
Title	Album details
Maciste All'Inferno	Released: 2003; Label: self-released; Live performance

=== Demo albums ===
List of demo albums
Title	Album details
Victim (as Godzilla)	Released: 1996; Label: self-released
Possessed (as Godzilla)	Released: 1997; Label: self-released
Saturate (as Godzilla)	Released: 1999; Label: self-released
Wisdom Comes (as Godzilla)	Released: 2000; Label: self-released

== Extended plays ==
List of extended plays
Title	EP details
End of Time	Released: 2011; Label: self-released

== Singles ==
List of singles, showing year released and album name
Title	Year	Peak chart positions	Album
Title	Year	US Main.	Album
"Of Blood and Salt"	2012	—	Unreleased Sea Sheperd EP
"L'Enfant Sauvage"	2012	—	L'Enfant Sauvage
"Stranded"	2016	—	Magma
"Silvera"	2016	—	Magma
"Another World"	2020	—	Fortitude
"Born for One Thing"	2021	—	Fortitude
"Amazonia"	2021	31	Fortitude
"Into the Storm"	2021	—	Fortitude
"The Chant"	2021	—	Fortitude
"Our Time Is Now"	2022	—	Non-album singles
"Mea Culpa (Ah! Ça ira!)"	2024	—	Non-album singles

== Videos ==
=== Music videos ===
List of music videos, showing year released and director(s)
Title	Year	Album	Director(s)
"Love"	2001	Terra Incognita	Alain Duplantier
"To Sirius"	2006	From Mars to Sirius	Alain Duplantier
"Vacuity"	2008	The Way of All Flesh	Julien Mokrani and Samuel Bodin
"All the Tears"	2009	The Way of All Flesh	Jossie Malis
"L'Enfant Sauvage"	2012	L'Enfant Sauvage	Anne Deguehegny
"Explosia"	2012	L'Enfant Sauvage	Anne Deguehegny
"Born In Winter"	2014	L'Enfant Sauvage	Jossie Malis
"Stranded"	2016	Magma	Vincent Caldoni
"Silvera"	2016	Magma	Drew Cox
"Low Lands"	2016	Magma	Alain Duplantier
"The Shooting Star"	2016	Magma	Markus Hofko
"The Cell"	2017	Magma	Drew Cox
"Another World"	2020	Fortitude	Maxime Tiberghien and Sylvain Favre
"Born for One Thing"	2021	Fortitude	Charles de Meyer
"Amazonia"	2021	Fortitude	Charles de Meyer
"The Chant"	2021	Fortitude	Russell Brownley
"Sphinx"	2021	Fortitude	Zev Deans

=== Video albums ===
List of video albums
Title	Album details
The Link Alive	Released: 16 April 2004; Label: Boycott
The Flesh Alive	Released: 6 June 2012; Label: Mascot
Les Enfants Sauvages	Released: 11 March 2014; Label: Roadrunner
