= Hypno5e =

French avant-garde metal band

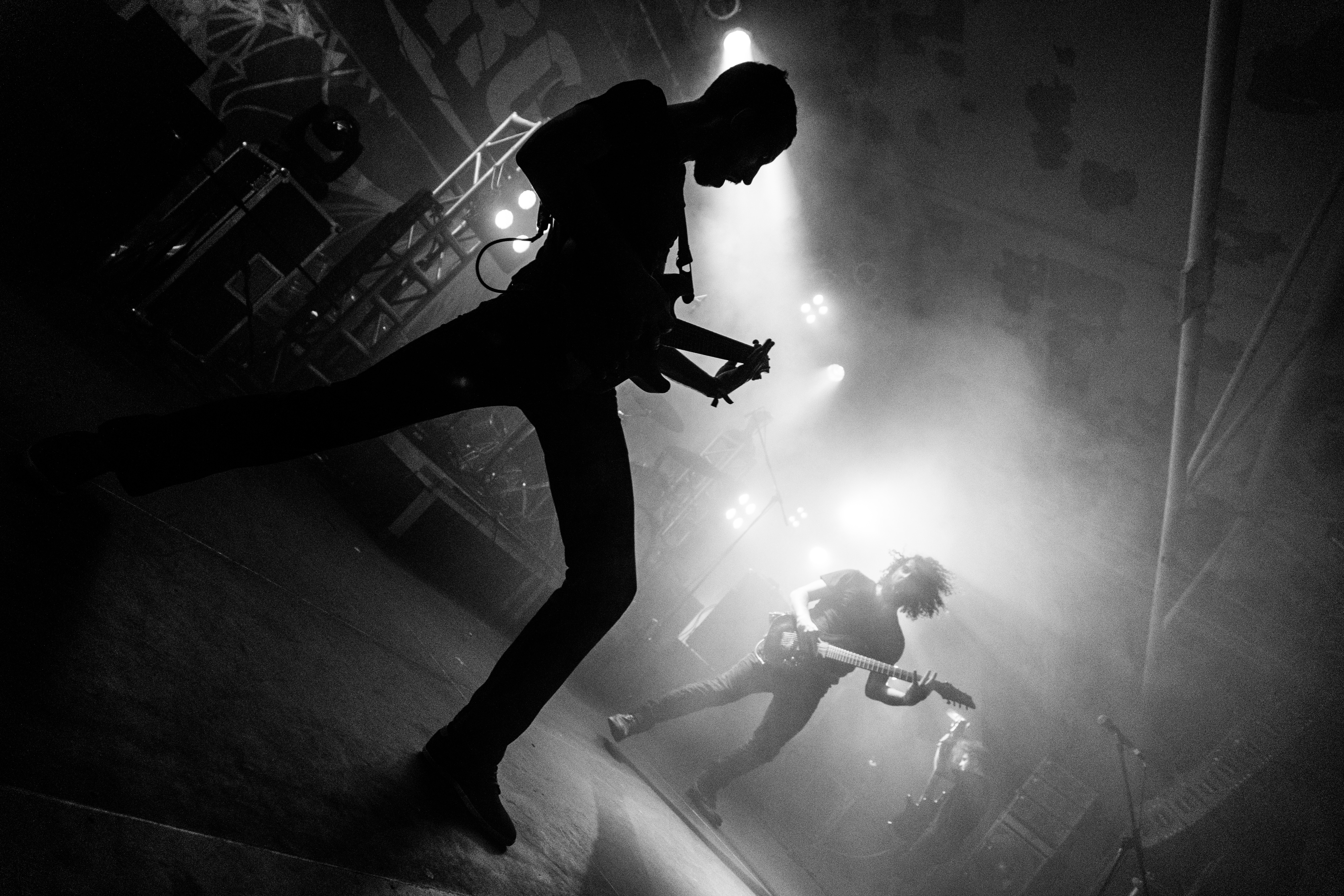
- Hypno5e performing live at Euroblast Festival 2015, Cologne, Germany

Background information
- Also known as: Hypnose (2003–2005), A Backward Glance on a Travel Road
- Origin: Montpellier, France
- Genres: Progressive metal; post-metal; sludge metal; extreme metal; avant-garde metal
- Years active: 2003–present
- Labels: Pelagic Records, Overcome Distribution, D-Prod
- Members: Emmanuel Jessua; Jonathan Maurois; Pierre Rettien; Charles Villanueva
- Past members: Thibault Lamy; Jérémie Lautier; Cédric Pages (aka Gredin); Théo Begue; Maxime Mangeant
- Website: www.hypno5e.com

Hypno5e is a French avant-garde metal band formed in Montpellier in 2003. They released their debut album Des Deux l'Une Est l'Autre in January 2007. Hypno5e uses lyrics in French, English and Castilian Spanish. The band has toured throughout France and the United States with other bands such as Gojira, the Ocean Collective, Watcha, Black Bomb A and Eths.

== Discography ==
=== Studio albums ===
- Des deux l'une est l'autre (2007)
- A Backward Glance on a Travel Road (2009) (as A Backward Glance on a Travel Road)
- Acid Mist Tomorrow (2012)
- Shores of the Abstract Line (2016)
- Alba - Les ombres errantes (2018)
- A Distant (Dark) Source (2019)
- Sheol (2023)
- Trame Noire (2026)

=== EPs ===
- Manuscrit côté MS408 (2006)

=== Demos ===
- H492053 (2004)

=== Singles ===
- "A Distant Dark Source" (2019)
- "Tauca - Part II (Nowhere)" (2019)
- "Sheol" (2022)

== Members ==
=== Current members ===
- Emmanuel Jessua – vocals, guitar (2003–present)
- Jonathan Maurois – guitar (2011–present)
- Pierre Rettien – drums (2022–present)
- Charles Villanueva – bass (2022–present)

=== Former members ===
- Thibault Lamy – drums, samples (2003–2012)
- Jérémie Lautier – guitar (2004–2010)
- Cédric "Gredin" Pages – bass, backing vocals (2005–2022)
- Théo Begue – drums, samples (2012–2021)
- Maxime Mangeant – drums (2021–2022)
