= Gojira (band) =

French metal band

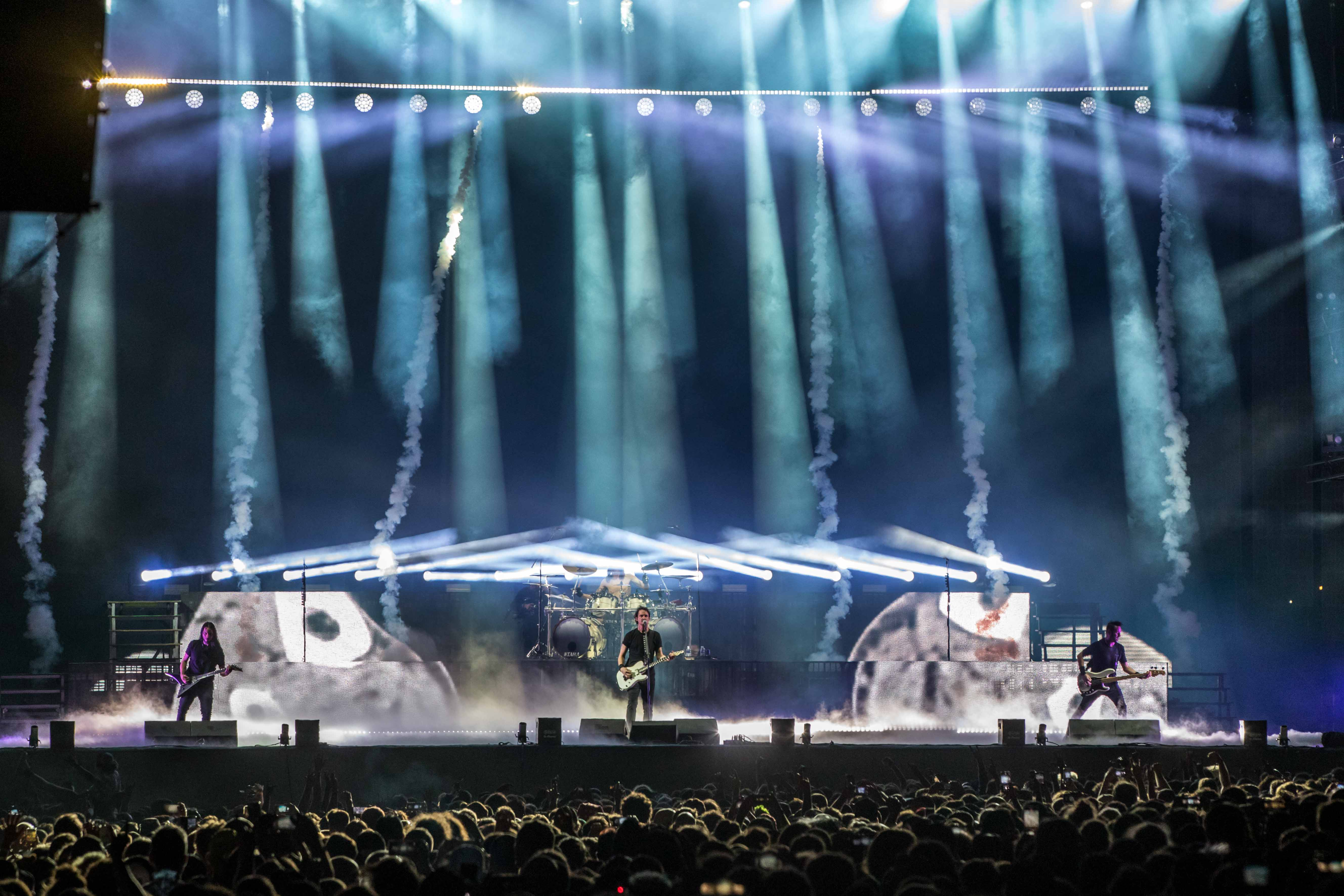
- Gojira performing in 2022; L–R: Christian Andreu, Mario Duplantier, Joe Duplantier, Jean-Michel Labadie

Background information
- Also known as: Godzilla (1996–2001)
- Origin: Ondres, Landes, France
- Genres: Progressive metal; technical death metal; groove metal; post-metal
- Years active: 1996–present
- Labels: Gabriel Editions; Boycott Records; Next Music; Listenable; Prosthetic; Roadrunner
- Spinoffs: Empalot
- Members: Joe Duplantier; Mario Duplantier; Christian Andreu; Jean-Michel Labadie
- Past members: Alexandre Cornillon
- Website: gojira-music.com

Gojira is a French heavy metal band from Ondres. Founded as Godzilla in 1996, the band's lineup—brothers Joe (vocals, guitar) and Mario Duplantier (drums), Christian Andreu (guitar), and Jean-Michel Labadie (bass)—has been the same since the band changed its name to Gojira in 2001. Gojira has been known for its progressive and technical death metal styles and lyrics that often feature themes of spirituality, philosophy, and environmentalism. The band has gone "from the utmost obscurity during the first half of their career to widespread global recognition in the second".

Gojira's first two albums, Terra Incognita (2001) and The Link (2003), and powerful live performances established its reputation as a leading French metal band. Maciste All'Inferno was a silent film score composed and performed for a one-night show in Bordeaux. Its third album, the critically acclaimed From Mars to Sirius (2005) with "Backbone", "The Heaviest Matter of the Universe", and "Flying Whales", was covered in the British metal press. The band then signed with Prosthetic Records, which gave it visibility in North America. The follow-up album, The Way of All Flesh (2008), charted on the Billboard 200, and Gojira later launched its first overseas headlining tour.

The band began recording the Sea Shepherd EP in a collaborative framework involving several metal musicians. In 2011, Gojira signed with Roadrunner Records. The band released L'Enfant Sauvage (2012) and Magma (2016), which peaked at numbers 34 and 24, respectively, on the Billboard 200 and were certified gold in France. Gojira shelved death metal in favor of a more straightforward style on Magma, the band's breakthrough album. In 2020, it released its first Billboard-charting single, "Another World". The chart-topping Fortitude (2021) was the best-selling album in the US during its first week. In 2022, Gojira attained arena headliner status in Europe, the UK, and South America. With a DIY approach, the band produces its albums at its own recording studios in France and New York City.

Gojira has released seven studio albums and three live DVDs, and is the first French band to top the Billboard Hard Rock Albums chart. The band has received Grammy nominations for Best Rock Album for Magma and Best Metal Performance for the singles "Silvera", "Amazonia", and "Mea Culpa (Ah! Ça ira!)". Throughout its career, the band has been involved in environmental, human rights, and animal rights activism.

Gojira also became the first heavy metal band to perform at an Olympics opening ceremony during the 2024 Summer Olympics in France.

== History ==
=== Background and formation (1993–1996) ===
At the age of seventeen, while in high school, vocalist and guitarist Joe Duplantier formed his first band called Eclipse after discovering heavy metal three years earlier. His brother, Mario, started a band at the age of twelve and had already demonstrated his capabilities as a drummer. Over time, the two brothers embarked on jam sessions after school.

Joe and Mario Duplantier, aged nineteen and fourteen respectively in 1996, decided to start a technical death metal band emphasizing melodies and recruited nineteen-year-old guitarist Christian Andreu. According to Mario, Andreu was "a passionate [fan], like we, of Metallica". They began practicing with guitars and drums in the Duplantiers' garage (where the group had set up a studio) in their hometown of Ondres in southern Landes, on the outskirts of Bayonne. The band soon recruited bassist Alexandre Cornillon, a friend of Andreu from Hossegor. Joe Duplantier said, "We wanted to go fast and strong. We had no plan, no pressure ... We didn't even have a [band] name".

=== Early years and Terra Incognita (1996–2002) ===
"Bleeding"
A sample of "Bleeding" from the 1997 demo album, Possessed

In 1996, the band settled on the name Godzilla. The idea sprang from the original 1954 kaiju film Godzilla and "the myth of the big furious atomic lizard ... It was, in our heads, a symbol of devastating power". The band first performed in Bayonne bars (four months after its formation), selling cassettes at shows and to their friends. Playing straight-ahead death metal with elements of thrash metal, Godzilla self-released a pair of demo albums (Victim in 1996 and Possessed in 1997), and toured southwest France.

Gojira's logo first appeared in 2001 on the album Terra Incognita

Cornillon left the band in 1998 and was replaced by Jean-Michel Labadie, a "young bass player very active on the Basque scene", according to author Marie-Hélène Soenen. Godzilla won the tremplin Ultrasons (Ultrasound Springboard, a regional festival for emerging artists) in early 1999. The band toured regularly, serving as the opening act for Cannibal Corpse, Edge of Sanity, and Impaled Nazarene. In September 1999, the band supported Immortal during a ten-date tour in France that ended in Lille. While touring with Immortal, Godzilla received national exposure, developing a reputation on the French metal scene for their "incendiary riffs". The band recorded Saturate, their third demo album, which was released in the Fall of 1999.

The band released Wisdom Comes, their fourth demo album, in 2000. Godzilla then began writing what they intended as their first full-length album, a project planned since 1996. According to Joe Duplantier, Mike Oldfield inspired his songwriting.

In 2001, Godzilla was legally compelled to change its name. They became "Gojira" (ゴジラ), the rōmaji spelling for the original Japanese name for Godzilla. Inspired by the production quality of an album by Watcha, a Parisian metal band, Gojira moved to the same Brussels studio to record their debut album, Terra Incognita. Before entering the recording studio, they asked friends and family for donations. Although Joe Duplantier said that Gojira took a long time to write the album, it was recorded in ten days.

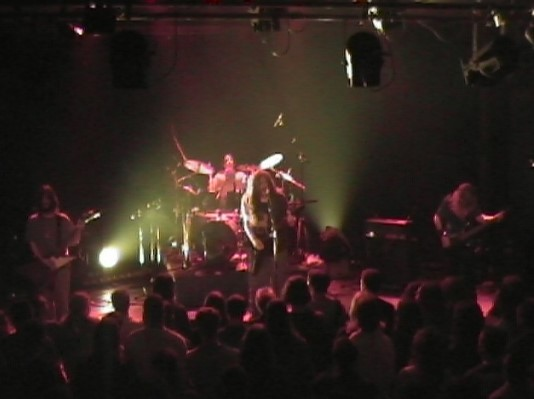
Gojira performing in Niort, France, during the October 2002 Terra Incognita Tour

After finishing recording and mixing by Stephan Kraemer at Impuls Studios, Gojira had no label, record company, or management. Joe Duplantier said that after the tour with Immortal, Gojira became "a real war machine". However, Soenen wrote that record labels called them "too ambitious" for their style of music. Labels advised them to abandon death metal and sing in French; "The door was clearly closed", said Joe Duplantier. The band realized that their way out was to consider an independent infrastructure; they established Gabriel Editions (their own label) as a limited-liability company. Andreu said that they could now "manage the band's activities, financing everything ourselves".

Gojira released their debut studio album, Terra Incognita, on Gabriel Editions in March 2001. The album "made significant waves", according to John D. Buchanan of AllMusic. Do-it-yourselfers, the band had a shipment of 1,500 albums delivered to the Duplantiers' parents' kitchen and persuaded a small store in Bayonne to sell them. Gojira then signed a contract with Sphere Management, and Richard Gamba became their manager. The band went on a nationwide tour to promote Terra Incognita, sharing the stage with French death–thrash metal crossover acts such as Scarve, Hertz and Silence, Nihil, and No Flag. Gojira later signed with the independent Boycott Records–Next Music for national distribution.

The band acquired what became Le Studio des Milans (Red Kites' Studio), a recording studio and rehearsal space in the Landes forest, in November 2002. The studio was originally a derelict barn, which Gojira rebuilt over a two-year period between tours and recording. On their investment, Joe Duplantier said that "The budget is important for this [second] record, but for the next one, it will be minimal", and further noted that they could "henceforth produce" their music "from A to Z".

=== The Link and From Mars to Sirius (2003–2007) ===
"Remembrance"
Sample of "Remembrance" from The Link (2003)

Writing The Link, Gojira's second studio album, took a year. Mario Duplantier said about his approach to the album that "it was a period during which I wanted to play fast: I was starting to master the grind parts and the double bass pedal properly". Newly purchased equipment had not been delivered to Le Studio des Milans, and the scheduled recording start date for the album had passed; it was hastily self-produced and recorded with Laurentx Etchemendy, the band's live engineer. The songs were conceived without delay on the vocals or reverb; Joe Duplantier called it "all very raw and very honest". In April 2003, Gojira released The Link; 2,500 copies were shipped to French stores with the same self-distribution as Terra Incognita. The Link was well received. In June, Gojira played at the Furyfest (an earlier version of Hellfest Summer Open Air) as part of a lineup of hardcore bands. Renowned for their live performances, Gojira was developing a fan base through a 40-concert nationwide tour. The band also performed beyond metropolitan France, including Belgium, Switzerland, and Bilbao.

In March 2004, the band played with Loudblast, No Return, Scarve, the Old Dead Tree and Garwall at La Locomotive in Montmartre. A reviewer described this Gojira concert as "timed, with millimeter precision, of a phenomenal power ... With a gigantic sound! ... the Landais cataclysm has just struck at La Locomotive". Gojira continued to promote the album and toured with the Swiss grindcore band Nostromo. Joe Duplantier (alongside singers of Loudblast and Scarve) appeared on the 2004 April issue of Rock Hard, which marked Gojira's first-ever magazine cover. The band released The Link Alive, a concert DVD from The Link tour, in April 2004. The DVD was filmed by a team of seventeen cameramen during a sold-out 2003 show for an audience of 800 in Bordeaux. The Link Alive, self-produced and self-distributed, was marketed without a major distributor and was followed by a 500-copy album version. In late May 2004, the organizers of the concert venue Le Florida in Agen invited Gojira and Yat-Kha for a three-show one-night stand of metal and ethno-rock music. Both bands played separately (Gojira toning down their performance) before playing together. In July 2004, Terra Incognita and The Link had sold 7,000 and 8,000 copies respectively. The Link era ended after a successful tour of almost two years, with significant financial difficulties. Gojira signed with the Mon Slip label (which gave them a higher financial advance), followed by a contract with French-based Listenable Records in December 2004.

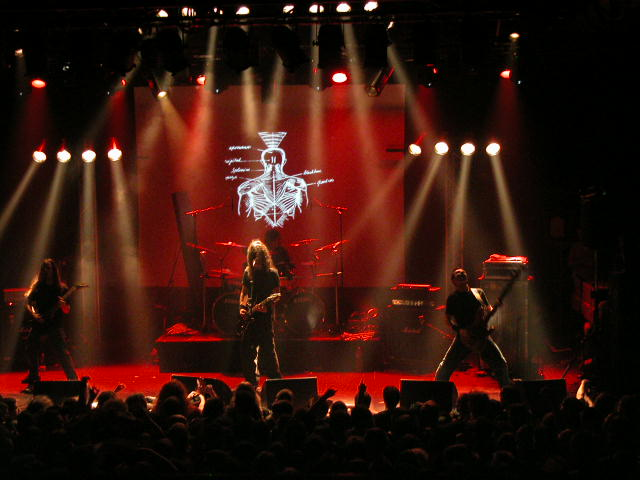
Gojira in Nantes during the October 2005 Sirius Tour

The band entered Le Studio des Milans to compose their third album, From Mars to Sirius, focusing on an "irreproachable sound". "Gojira wants to control all stages of creation, from composition to mixing", said Labadie. For the album's themes, Joe Duplantier was influenced by the possibility of other worlds and dimensions. He devoted his time to reading The Celestine Prophecy and books by Baird T. Spalding and other spiritual seekers. Writing the album took seven months, reinforced by Labadie and Andreu. The band performed "Backbone" and "The Heaviest Matter of the Universe" from their forthcoming album at the twenty-ninth Printemps de Bourges in April 2005. Gojira released From Mars to Sirius, their self-produced album, in September of that year; it received positive reviews from French music critics. Pascal Bagot of RFI wrote that "the public and critical acclaim is phenomenal". Fifteen thousand albums were shipped to French stores. Entering the Top Albums chart in France at No. 44, it remained on the chart for three weeks. After the album's release, Gojira toured France, Belgium, and the Netherlands. That year, Listenable Records re-released The Link.

In 2006, the "surging wave Gojira" inspired London journalist Lucy Williams of Kerrang! to write a laudatory article about the album. The band played a February concert at the Élysée Montmartre in Paris, where a number of journalists had gathered. By the end of the month, The Link Alive DVD had sold over 5,000 copies and From Mars to Sirius had sold 12,000 to 13,000 copies. According to Labadie, they earned their living primarily by touring. At that time, they worked jointly with Listenable Records, intending to promote their music overseas; "Gojira wants to work with people whose approach is sincere", said Labadie. In May, after 300 concerts in France and the surrounding region, the band signed a contract with American label Prosthetic Records (an "exclusive licensing agreement" with Listenable Records) to give them exposure in North America. Gojira performed in Brighton (their first UK show) on 19 May, forging links with England's media community after a party organized by Kerrang!

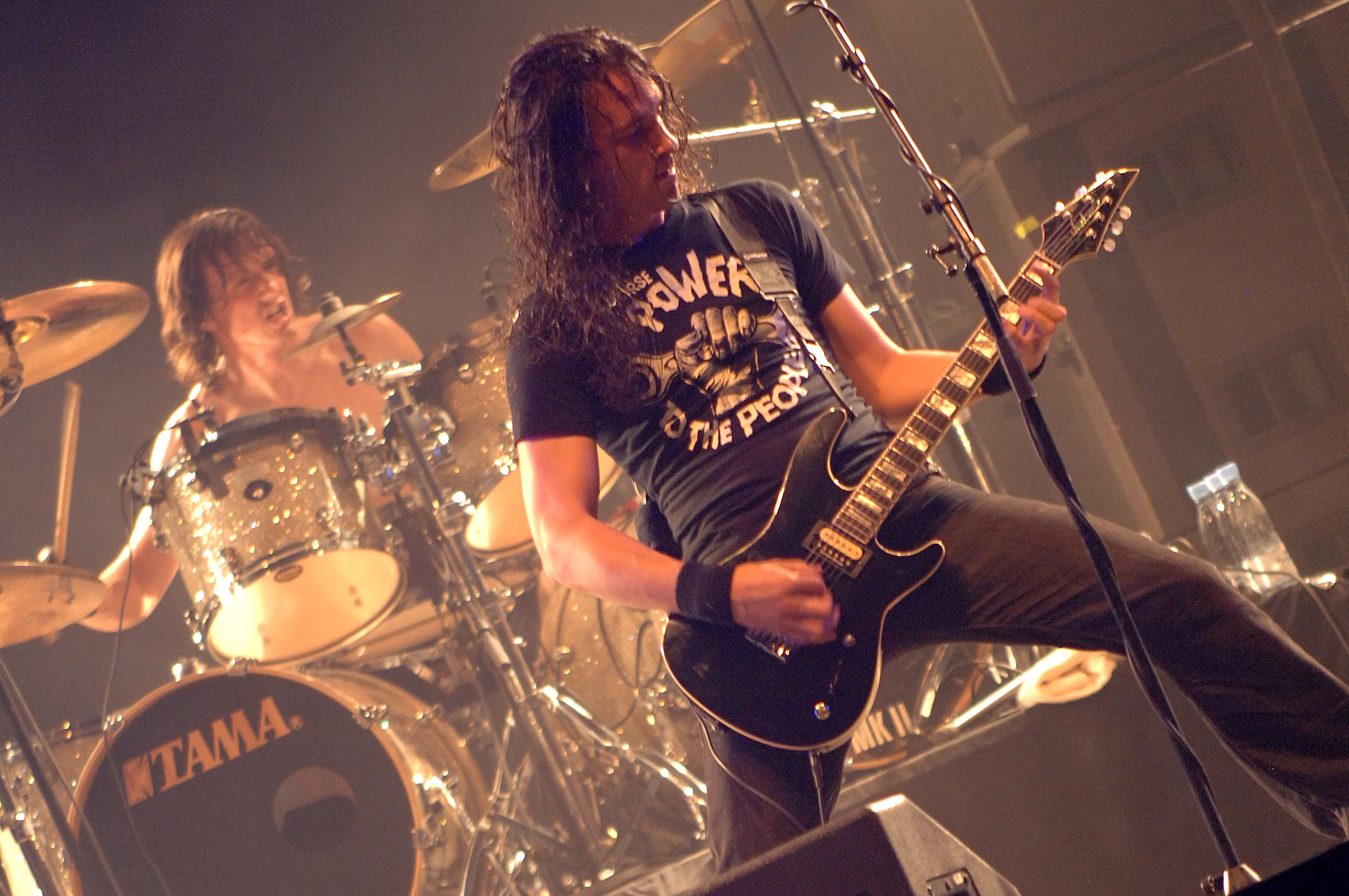
Mario (left) and Joe Duplantier during a 2007 Gojira concert at Denmark's Roskilde Festival

After Williams' article in Kerrang! and increased exposure in the British metal press, Gojira was asked to replace Mastodon at England's 2006 Download Festival; according to Joe Duplantier, "It was a decisive concert". In June, they performed on the main stage at the Hellfest Summer Open Air in Clisson, and a series of summer festivals in Germany, England and the Scandinavian countries. Prosthetic Records released From Mars to Sirius in the US on 22 August 2006, which led to a sudden pre-order of 5,000 copies on the label's website, followed by an upload of a cover version of Metallica's "Escape". AllMusic writer Eduardo Rivadavia highlighted the album's songwriting, describing the "fluidity with which utmost heaviness and delicate melodies were made to coexist" in songs such as "Flying Whales", "World to Come", and "Where Dragons Dwell". In September (a year after its release), the album had sold over 20,000 copies in France and as many abroad. In early October, Gojira and Hatesphere began a co-headlining tour of the UK. In November, the band performed at the European Unholy Alliance Tour, headlined by Slayer at Paris' Accor Arena. The band was included in Children of Bodom's US tour in late 2006, joining Amon Amarth and Sanctity as opening acts. Brandon Geist of Revolver wrote that since the release of From Mars to Sirius, "they have risen from virtual unknowns outside of their homeland to the single-most-buzzed-about metal band on the planet".

In March 2007, Listenable Records (Prosthetic Records in the US), reissued The Link with remastered audio and new booklet artwork in North America. The following month, the label released The Link Alive DVD in the US. Gojira later supported Lamb of God on their American tour with Trivium and Machine Head. The band made a cameo appearance in Machine Head's "Aesthetics of Hate" music video, which was broadcast on 5 May on MTV2's Headbangers Ball. The band supported Trivium on the UK dates of their European tour with Sanctity and Annihilator, and made a number of festival appearances. In October, Listenable Records re-released Gojira's 1997 demo album Possessed as a limited-edition CD. Gojira participated in the late-2007 Radio Rebellion Tour, featuring co-headliners Behemoth, Job for a Cowboy, and Beneath the Massacre. Near the end of their over-220-concert tour to promote From Mars to Sirius, Gojira began working on their follow-up album.

=== The Way of All Flesh (2008–2011) ===
Returning to Le Studio des Milans to write their fourth studio album, The Way of All Flesh, Gojira had developed their desired sound by touring. Joe Duplantier said that the album would be "more intense, more brutal, and more melodic" than its predecessor. The album took four months to write, with its songwriting finished in late March 2008. The album was recorded from April to June, and the drums were initially recorded by Logan Mader with Joe and Mario Duplantier in Los Angeles before they returned to Le Studio des Milans to continue working with Laurentx Etchemendy. Mader mixed the album in Los Angeles over a two-week period. Randy Blythe of the American band Lamb of God, an active supporter of Gojira in the US, co-wrote and appeared on "Adoration for None". In August, two months before the album was released, Gojira performed "Vacuity" live for the first time at the Rock en France Festival in Arras as the opening act for Metallica.

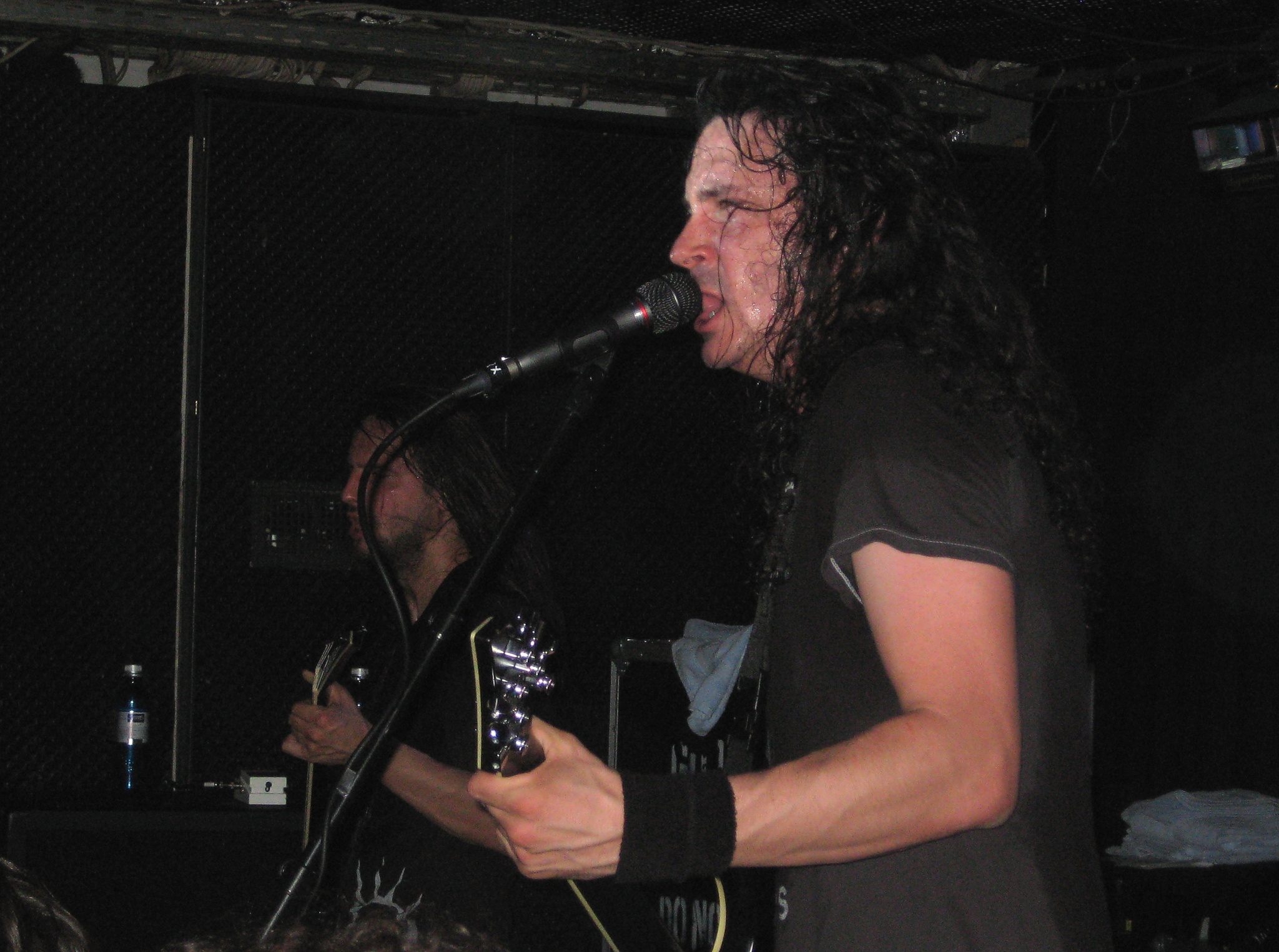
Andreu (left) and Joe Duplantier in 2009

The Way of All Flesh was released on 13 October 2008 in Europe on Listenable Records and the following day in North America on Prosthetic Records. The album debuted at No. 138 on the US Billboard 200 chart, selling 4,200 copies in its first week of release. It reached No. 28 on France's Top Albums chart, and No. 25 on the Official Finnish Albums Chart. The album topped the Billboard Heatseekers Albums chart for one week, remaining on the chart for four weeks. It reached No. 21 on the Billboard Independent Albums chart. Rivadavia wrote that the album provided "imaginative progressive headbangers ... that were rife with technical fireworks and songwriting variety" and "a few failed experiments". Gojira supported In Flames's European tour in October, touring North America in November and December. The Way of All Flesh ranked fifth on Metal Hammer's list of the top 50 albums of 2008, and LA Weekly listed it as one of the year's top 10 metal albums.

In late January 2009, Gojira began a headlining tour of France, the UK, and Ireland to promote the album. On 17 March, the band's first North American headlining tour was announced; their opening bands were the Chariot and Car Bomb. In June, Gojira followed Soulfly on the main stage at the Hellfest Summer Open Air and performed to more than 20,000 people. They appeared for the fourth time at Belgium's July Dour Festival and Les Eurockéennes de Belfort. Terra Incognita was re-released with bonus tracks on 24 August in Europe and on 15 October in North America. Gojira accompanied Metallica on their tour of the US and Canada from 14 September to 12 October, performing before Lamb of God. Lamb of God frontman Randy Blythe began to join Gojira on "Backbone" at concerts when the bands appeared together. The tour included headline dates on off days, supported by Burst and Zoroaster. As their popularity spread to America's metal scene, a Blabbermouth.net poster said that the band "has become one of metal's most acclaimed and admired acts". Gojira returned to France after the US tour for a few concerts and began a planned six-month hiatus; Joe Duplantier cited "just five days' break" since 2004.

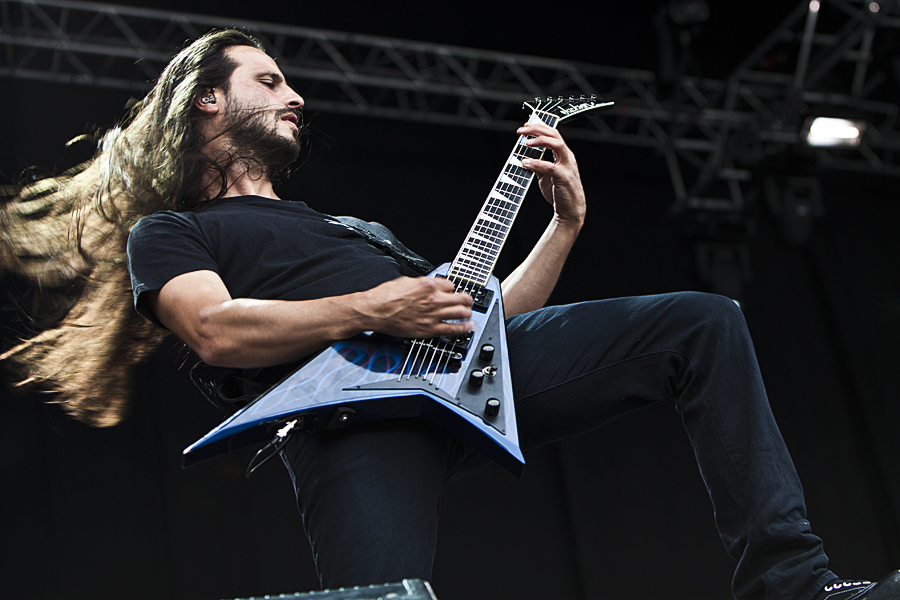
Andreu at the Bergen Calling Festival in Norway, 2011

The band's break ended earlier than expected after Gojira was announced as the opening act of Metallica's European and Russian tour in April 2010. In July of that year, they were included in the lineup of the rock-oriented Vieilles Charrues Festival in Brittany. (Note: Before the concert, Le Télégramme warned festival attendees that "Gojira could blow up the sound barrier tonight".) Playing for an audience largely unaccustomed to metal music, Gojira's "delicate mission" was to close Saturday evening on the Glenmor stage. Described in an article in Le Télégramme as "more powerful" than Motörhead's concert in 2008 on the same stage, the show began with "Lizard Skin" to an estimated crowd of 40,000 to 50,000; twenty minutes later, between 4,000 and 5,000 people remained. According to Le Télégramme, "The show had a rare sonic power ... so brutal that the band lost 90 percent of its attendance along the way". Undaunted, they continued to perform "as if their lives depended on it" with a drum solo of "breathtaking mastery". Since the Gojira show, metal has been slowly excluded from the Vieilles Charrues Festival. In August, they headlined the Rock Altitude Festival in Switzerland. The band continued to promote The Way of All Flesh into 2010, including the European Wacken Open Air, Bloodstock Open Air, and Brutal Assault festivals.

Gojira had made substantial progress on their fifth album by March 2011, saying that they had written almost half of it; according to Joe Duplantier "These songs are original and a good reflection of what we are today". The band was relatively quiet during the year, focusing on new material and playing a handful of concerts in June and July, including at the Sonisphere Festival in Greece and France. The band became free agents during the summer of 2011, after their contract with Prosthetic Records expired. Admired by Monte Conner, Gojira was acquired by Roadrunner Records on 9 November 2011. (Note: After a "fiercely" competitive bidding war between record labels.) With their new recording contract, the band entered Spin Studios in New York City in November to record their next album.

=== L'Enfant Sauvage (2012–2015) ===
Gojira's fifth album, L'Enfant Sauvage, was co-produced by Josh Wilbur and Joe Duplantier. The band juxtaposed their death-metal roots with more ambient and sophisticated elements on the album to find "the ultimate sound" on which they had been working since their beginning. In 2012, K2 Agency founder John Jackson agreed to produce Gojira concerts abroad.

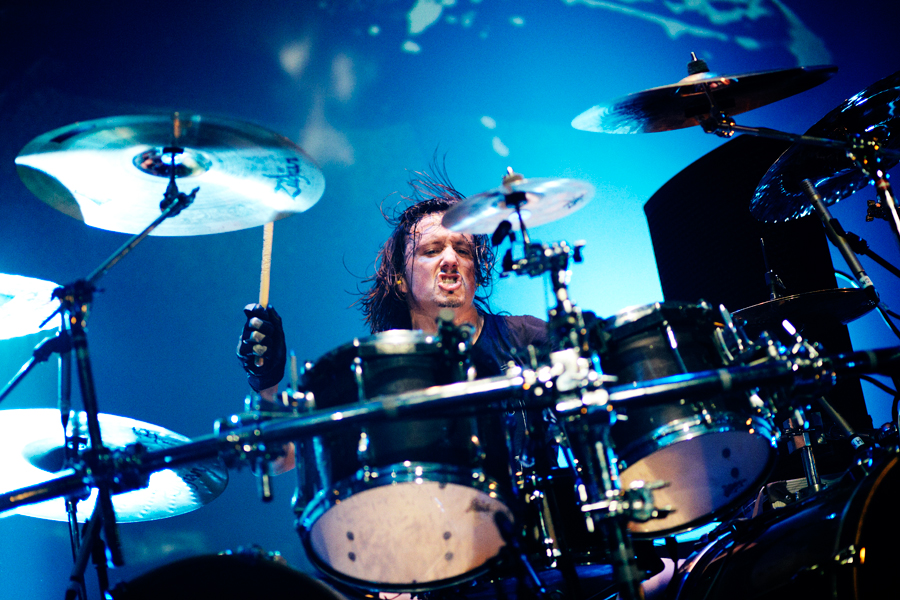
Mario Duplantier performing in Brittany, France, in 2012

In March 2012, Devin Townsend and Meshuggah's Fredrik Thordendal joined Gojira for the collaboration track "Of Blood And Salt" (intended to appear on the unreleased Sea Shepherd EP) at the Soundwave Festival in Australia. With Volcom Entertainment, a limited-edition 7" single containing "Bleeding" and "End of Time"—originally on Godzilla's 1997 Possessed demo—was released in 12" vinyl packaging in North America and Europe. (Note: Volcom Entertainment had originally organized two exhibitions of Mario Duplantier's art in France.) Following an Australian tour with Mastodon and Kvelertak, Gojira began a national tour supporting the album. After many tours with Metallica, the band was invited to open a series of concerts on the European Black Album Tour (including the Stade de France, the country's largest stadium, on 12 May 2012). Gojira's performance was measured at 120 decibels in the backstage corridors, setting a stadium volume record. (Note: The loudest crowd roar at the Stade de France was measured by a sound level meter at 109 decibels, from 80,000 fans during the 2015 Coupe de la Ligue Final.) About Metallica's motive for taking Gojira on tour with them, James Hetfield told a reporter, "I discovered their music with From Mars to Sirius, an album that I loved. Humanly speaking, I liked them a lot. They have their feet on the ground, are intelligent, sensitive. I have immense respect for them. And then Mario is an incredible drummer." Gojira performed at the European Sonisphere Festival during the summer. The band shared two French dates with Slayer headlining: 27 May in Toulouse and 29 May in Clermont-Ferrand. Mascot Records released a live DVD/Blu-ray, The Flesh Alive, on 4 June in Europe.

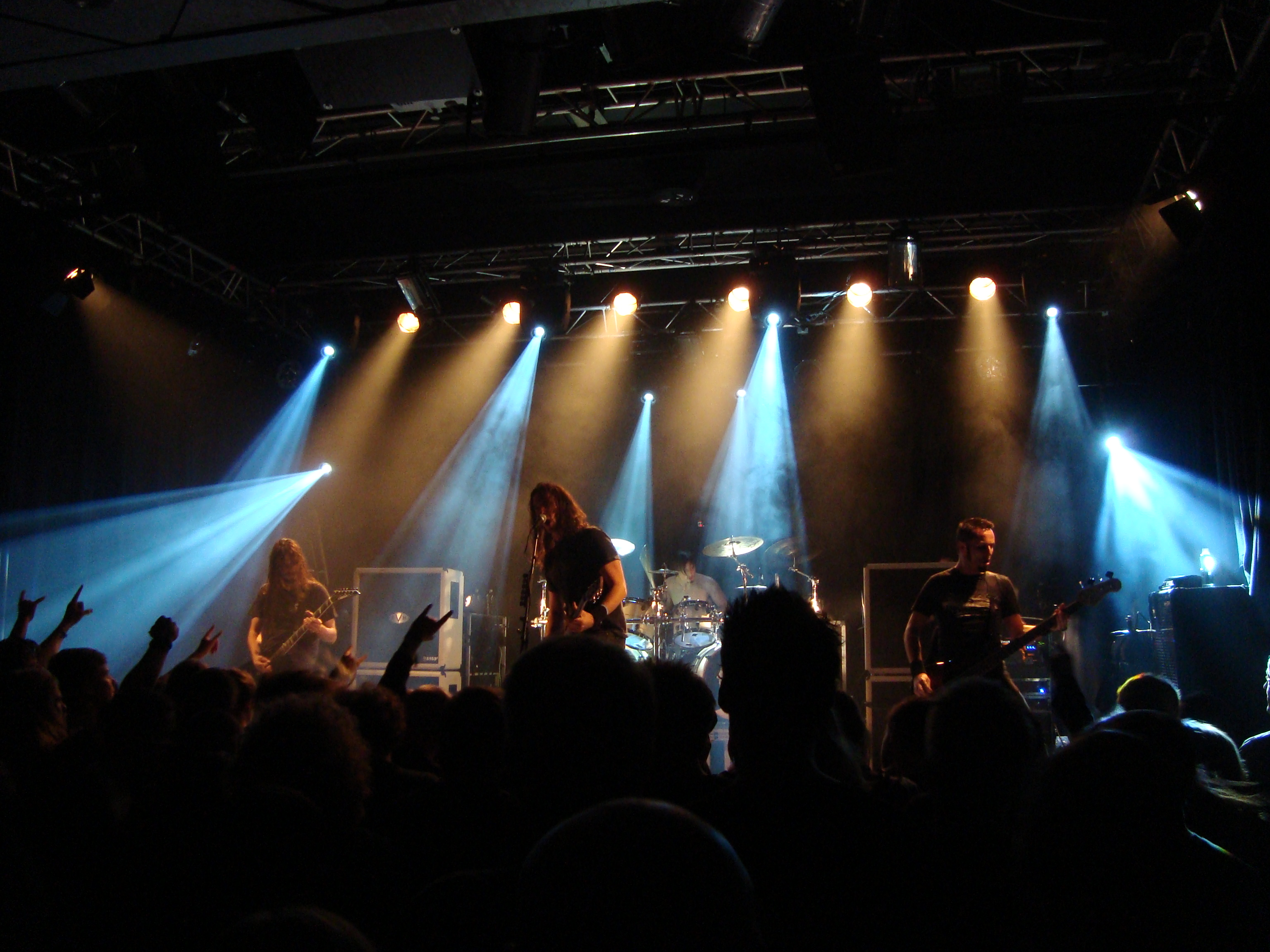
At the 2012 Aalborg Metal Festival in Denmark

Gojira released L'Enfant Sauvage in June 2012 on Roadrunner Records for worldwide distribution. The album reached No. 34 on the Billboard 200, selling 11,000 copies in the US in its first week. L'Enfant Sauvage charted 104 places higher in its first week than The Way of All Flesh did. It peaked at No. 9 on the Billboard Tastemaker Albums chart, No. 13 on the US Top Rock Albums chart, and No. 6 on the Billboard Hard Rock Albums chart. The album reached the top 40 in six European countries. In Flanders and Wallonia it charted for 10 and 14 weeks, respectively. Terrorizer's Rob Sayce said that the album charted "without making a single concession to accessibility". Dom Lawson of The Guardian gave the album the maximum rating of five stars, and Stephen Hill of Metal Hammer called the album "the bridge between Gojira's past and future".

In June, Gojira participated in the Nova Rock Festival. The Flesh Alive DVD was released in the US on 31 July, and the band then began the long L'Enfant Sauvage World Tour. Gojira's setlist during the tour contained "Tron", a short interlude where Mario Duplantier and his brother swapped instruments. Gojira was scheduled to tour North America with Lamb of God and Dethklok, but the tour was postponed due to the incarceration of Randy Blythe in the Czech Republic; the tour was postponed until October. However, despite instabilities, the band continued to tour North America and was included at the Slipknot's Knotfest at Somerset Amphitheater with Cannibal Corpse, Deftones, and Serj Tankian. In August 2012, at the Heavy Montréal Festival, Labadie announced the European tour until the end of 2012 and a US and Canadian tour in 2013. By this time, Joe Duplantier had lived in New York for a year; his brother, Labadie, and Andreu remained in southwestern France. Labadie said, "We communicate differently, because of the time difference, and it is not really easy, but that is okay because he is truly happy to live in the States ... he is passionate about the United States; his mother is American". On 15 December, Gojira headlined the Indian Metal Festival in Bangalore; "the whole front row was crying", said Joe Duplantier. Their musicianship and live performances had earned them the nickname "Gojiramazing" by fans in 2012.

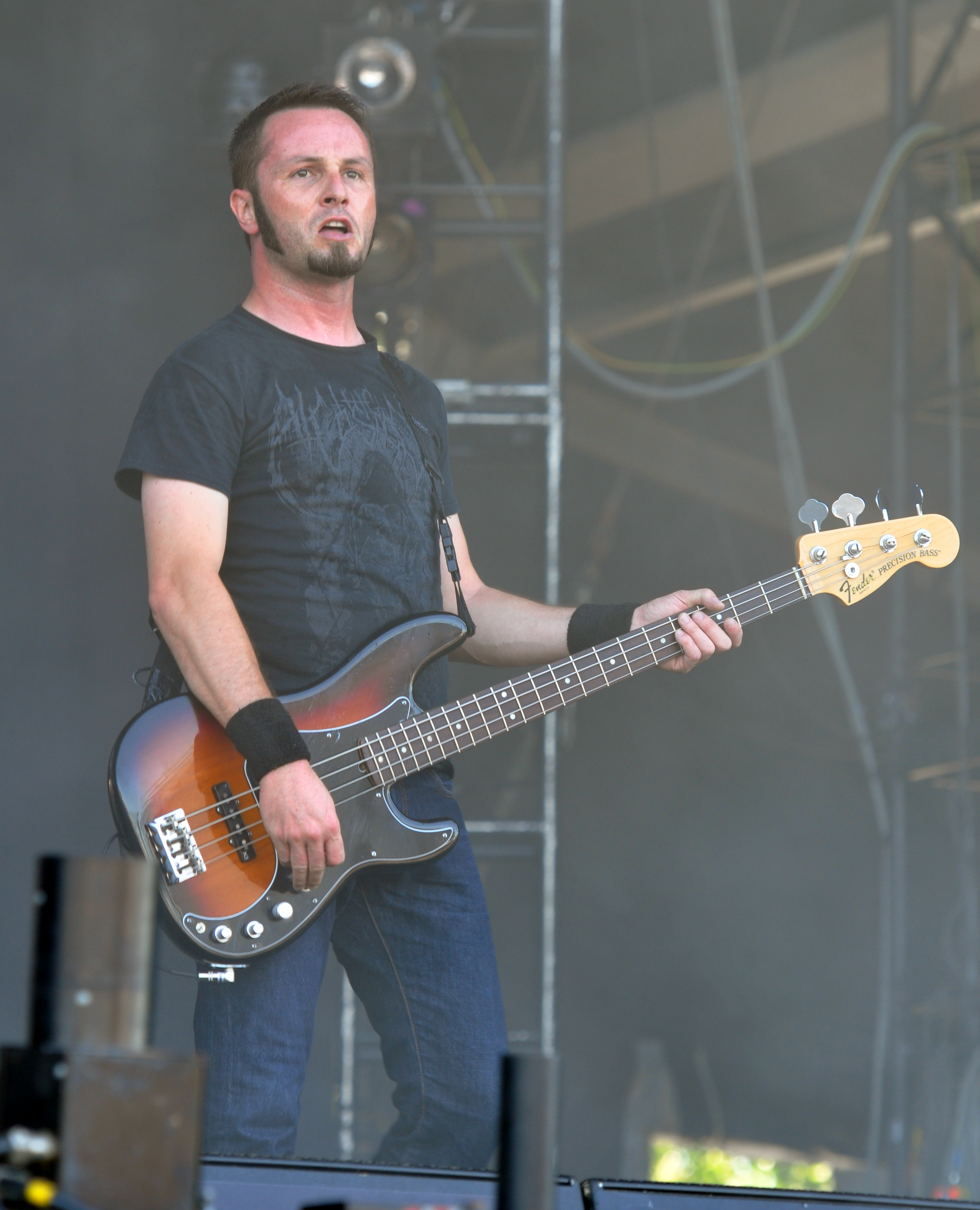
Labadie at the 2013 Wacken Open Air festival

In January and February 2013, Gojira, the Devin Townsend Project and the Atlas Moth toured North America. In March, the band played a handful of UK concerts supporting Ghost on the Jägermeister Music Tour. In the middle of the month, Gojira headlined Norway's Trondheim Metal Fest. L'Enfant Sauvage was nominated for Album Of The Year at the Revolver Golden Gods Awards at Club Nokia in downtown Los Angeles on 2 May 2013. Gojira received the Metal Hammer Golden Gods Award for Best Live Band at The O2 on 17 June 2013 in London. The tour continued, and the band appeared at the Hellfest Summer Open Air, the Wacken Open Air, and the Bloodstock Open Air. Gojira made its first Israeli appearance on 15 August 2013 at Reading 3 in Tel Aviv, a "packed venue", according to Terrorizer's Avi Pitchon, whose security barriers were bent by the crowd. The band performed at Austin's November Fun Fun Fun Fest, followed by a North American tour with 4Arm and Slayer.

Gojira released Les Enfants Sauvages in March 2014, a live-CD/DVD and picture book documenting the band's more than 150 concerts on three continents in support of L'Enfant Sauvage. The DVD includes a March 2013 Jägermeister Music Tour concert at London's Brixton Academy which was recorded by 14 cameras. In an interview that month at Australia's Soundwave Festival, Mario Duplantier said that the band was working on a new album. Gojira supported Mastodon and Kvelertak on a string of North American dates in April and May. The band continued successfully touring in support of the album, further consolidating their discography and launching them "into a new realm of success", wrote Graham Hartmann of Loudwire. The band played throughout the United States and Europe, including Rock on the Range, Resurrection Fest, Garorock Festival in Marmande (for the third time) and the Graspop Metal Meeting. Gojira continued on the festival circuit, headlining the Sylak Open Air Festival on 9 August 2014 in France and the Vagos Open Air Festival the following day in Lisbon. Mastodon, Gojira and Kvelertak reunited for another US tour in October and November 2014. Joe Duplantier began work on a recording studio in Ridgewood, Queens in November, and Mario moved to New York.

=== Magma (2015–2019) ===
Joe and Mario Duplantier finished building Silver Cord Studio, Joe's New York recording studio, in early April 2015. It has become Gojira's recording studio and headquarters in America, joining Le Studio des Milans in Ondres. Audio files were created sporadically since late 2013 "on the computer in the tour bus", said Mario Duplantier; the new songs were a change in style for the band, as Joe experimented with clean vocals. The brothers began recording Magma, Gojira's sixth album, at Silver Cord Studio on 6 April. Ten days into recording, however, recording was suspended when they learned that their mother was ill and flew back to France.

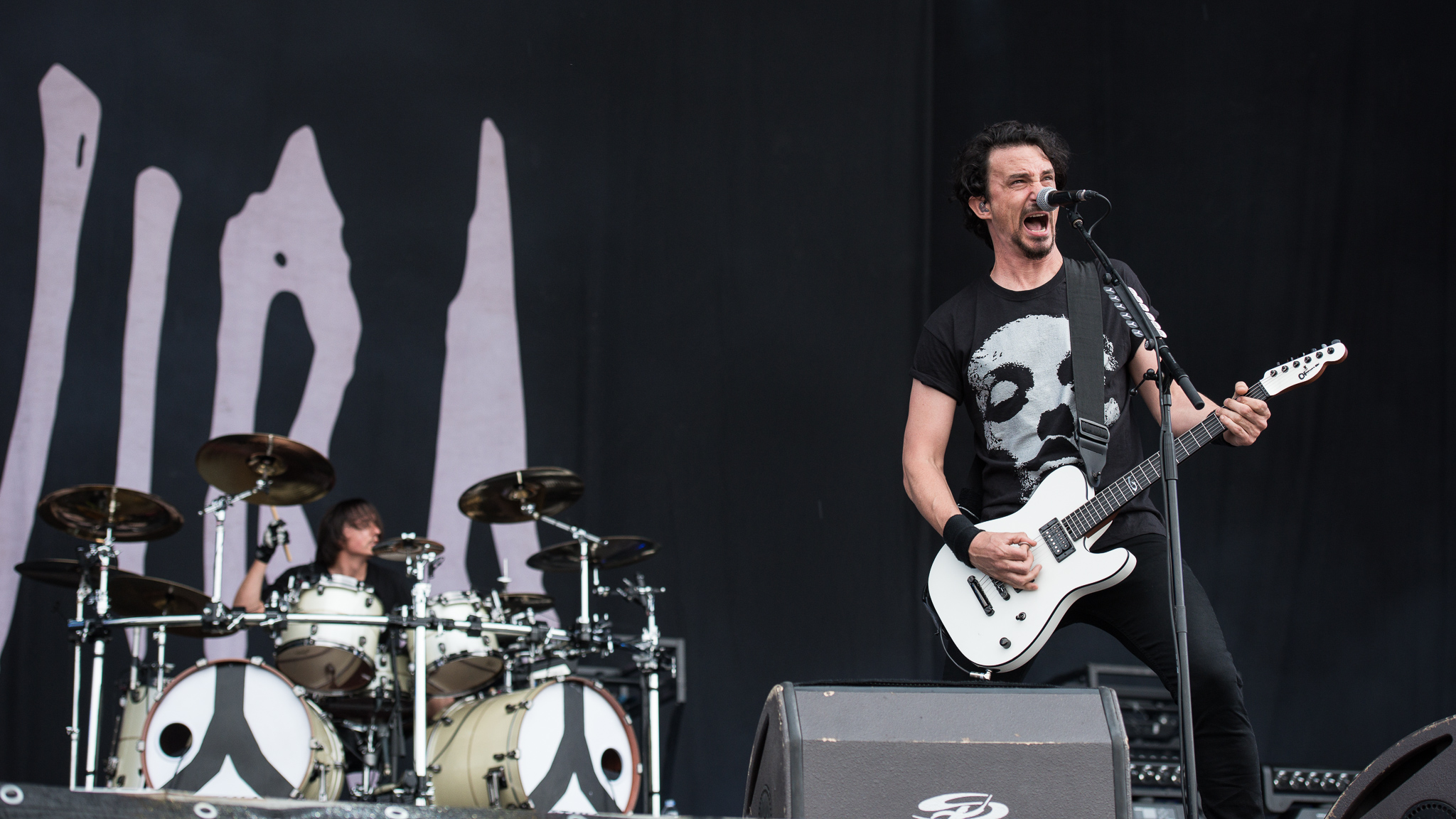
The death of Mario and Joe Duplantier's mother greatly affected the recording of Magma.

The band played a handful of dates in Europe for several festivals, ending L'Enfant Sauvage's tour cycle. On 5 July 2015, Patricia Rosa Duplantier died of cancer; Gojira concerts were canceled, and the recording of Magma was greatly affected. The band again toured worldwide, commencing at Musilac Music Festival in Aix-les-Bains on 10 July, and was billed beneath Korn at the Rock Off Festival in Istanbul on 1 August. On 28 August, Mario Duplantier announced before Gojira's concert in Dublin that recording had resumed and was almost completed. The band played at Brazil's Rock in Rio festival, one of the world's largest music festivals, on 19 September and closed their set with "The Gift of Guilt". From mid-September to mid-October, their tour visited Canada, Mexico, Argentina, and the Santiago Gets Louder Festival in Chile. Gojira went to Japan as the supporting act for Slayer in Osaka and Tokyo in October 2015, followed by a performance at the Loud Park Festival at Saitama Super Arena before returning to Israel shortly afterwards.

Rolling Stone included the band's forthcoming release in their list of "25 Most Anticipated Metal Albums of 2016". In May 2016, Joe Duplantier announced the itinerary (in larger venues) in France, Italy, Poland, Switzerland, Belgium and the UK for the tour supporting the upcoming album. In early June, a private concert for one hundred people was filmed in black and white by seven cameras at a television studio in Plaine Saint-Denis (near Paris). Director Paul Ouazan decided to film a performance video focused on the crowd: "I was immediately convinced that the band had a fifth member: its audience". The performance was broadcast on Arte later that month. The band was included in the live lineup of the 13 June Metal Hammer Golden Gods Awards at the Eventim Apollo in London. They made their first world television appearance as musical guests of the day on Le Petit Journal three days later, performing an excerpt from "Silvera" in prime time on Canal+ in France.

"Stranded"
A sample of "Stranded" from Magma

Magma, Gojira's self-produced album, was released on 17 June 2016 on Roadrunner Records. The album was available for streaming on the band's official YouTube channel two days before its release. It debuted at No. 24 on the Billboard 200 chart, selling 17,000 units in its first week of release in the US. The album debuted and peaked at No. 4 on the Billboard Top Rock Albums chart and No. 6 on the Tastemaker Albums chart. It topped the Billboard Hard Rock Albums chart, making Gojira the first French band to top that chart. The album debuted (and peaked) at No. 17 on the Billboard's Canadian Albums Chart, and debuted at No. 11 on Australia's Australian Albums Chart. Magma reached the top 40 in twelve European countries and the top 10 in Switzerland, Finland, Austria, Norway and France. The album had a generally-favorable critical reception, scoring a 79 on Metacritic. Gojira departed from its tech-death and tried to emphasize its progressive–post-genres side, which divided some fans. Remfry Dedman of The Independent called the band "pioneers of modern 21st-century progressive metal".

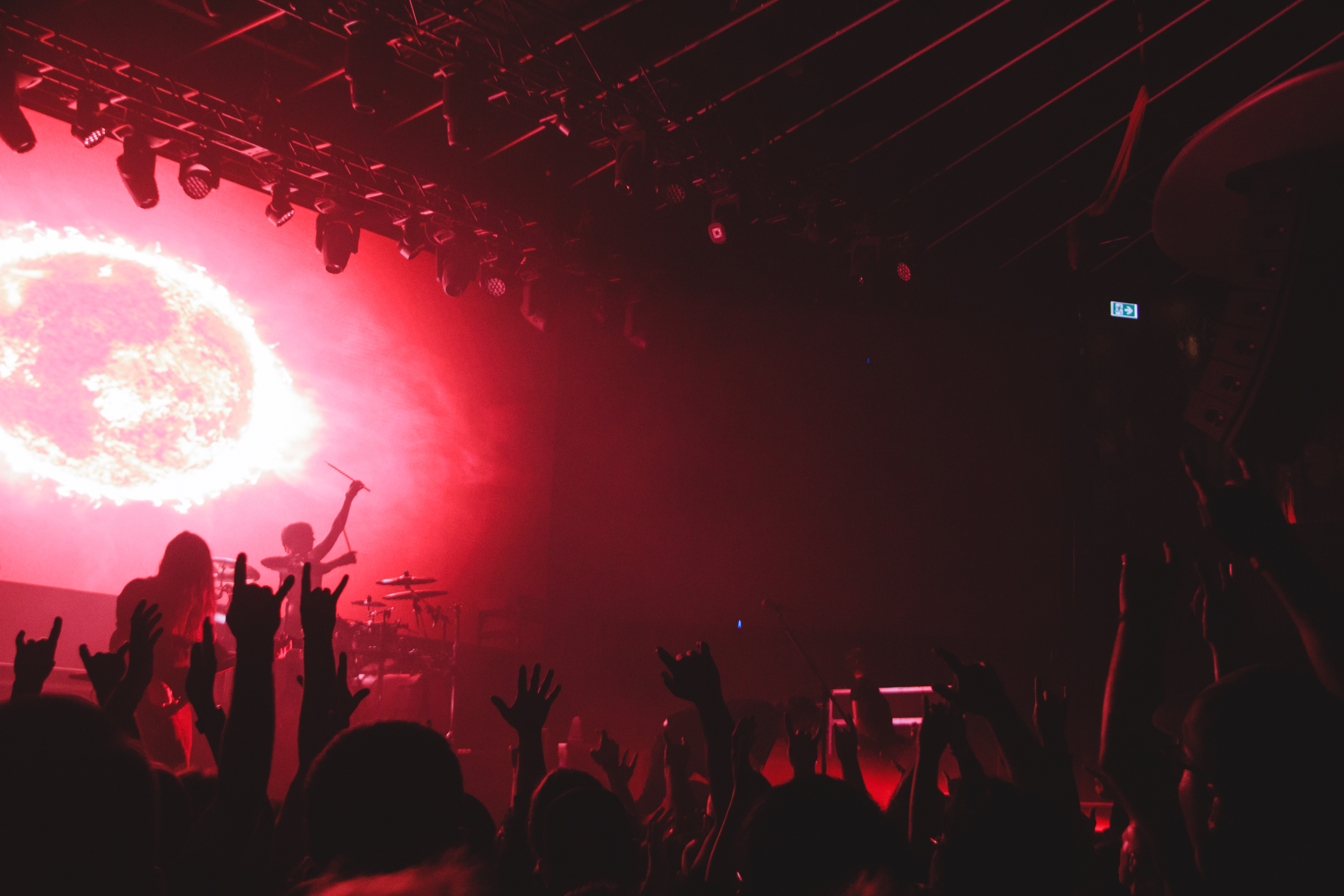
Gojira in Toronto during the Magma Tour, 2016

Gojira began its three-to-four-year Magma world tour in Europe and at a number of summer music festivals, followed by a 27-date headlining tour of North America with Tesseract as the opening act from mid-July through October 2016. By this time, Gojira had made seventeen US tours. The band began their UK and European arena tour in November and December with Alter Bridge, Volbeat and Like a Storm. A November 2016 Metal Hammer article said that Gojira had "emerged as one of the most important metal outfits on the planet", with a "loyal, passionate, fiercely evangelical fanbase". In mid-November, the band appeared on a live broadcast of the BBC Radio 1 Rock Show at London's Maida Vale Studios. Kirk Hammett later called Magma "an incredible piece of art".

In January 2017, Gojira began a French tour with nine consecutive sold-out concerts. (Note: Grindcore band Nostromo, with whom Gojira shared the stage on the Terra Incognita tour, was chosen as the opener for the tour.) Two more sold-out concerts concluded the French leg of the tour at the Paris Olympia on 1 and 2 April. Within eight months of its release, Magma had sold 400,000 copies worldwide. On 12 February 2017, the band was nominated for two Grammy Awards; Magma was nominated for Best Rock Album and its second single, "Silvera", was nominated for Best Metal Performance at the 59th Annual Grammy Awards at the Staples Center in Los Angeles. At that time, Gojira was labeled a "French-American metal band" by the Los Angeles Times. On 6 May 2017, the band performed along with Opeth, Mastodon, Eagles of Death Metal, the Devin Townsend Project, and Russian Circles at Philadelphia's Electric Factory. Magma received the Best Album award at the Metal Hammer Golden Gods Awards on 12 June 2017. Gojira began a short run of US co-headlining dates with Opeth, and supported Metallica's US WorldWired Tour that summer with Avenged Sevenfold and Volbeat. They headlined the Main Stage 2 at Download Festival, before Linkin Park on the Main Stage 1, in Paris on 9 June and Spain on 22 June. On 15 July, Gojira had top billing at the Dynamo Metal Fest in Eindhoven. The band played a US headlining tour during the fall; Converge, Code Orange, Pallbearer, Oni, and Torche supported them on selected dates with festival appearances. In 2017, Mario Duplantier returned to France due to visa-related technical reasons and to see his family, saying that Gojira "is a bit in Ondres, a little bit in Brooklyn, a bit in Bassussarry ... Between the Landes, the United States, and the Basque Country".

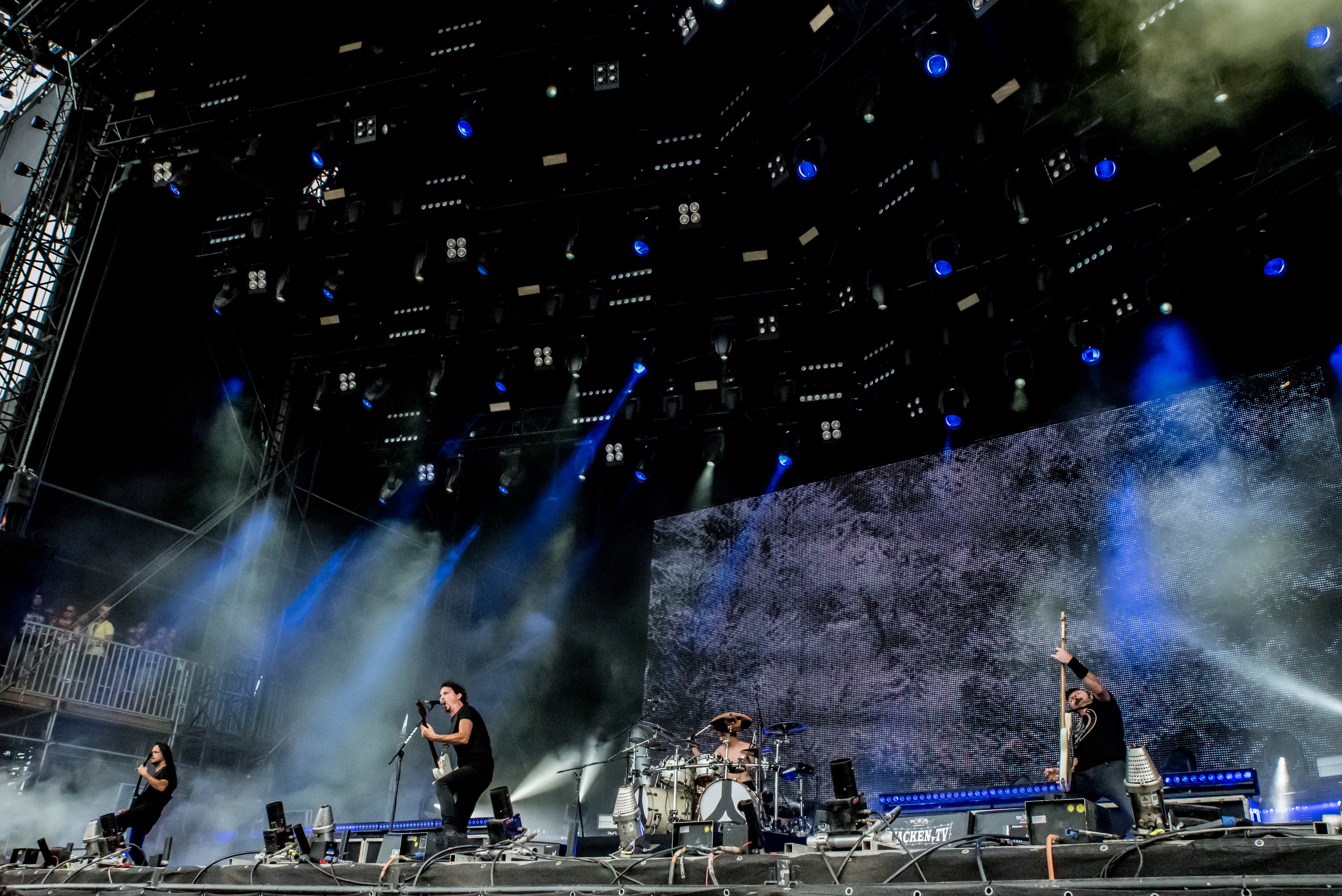
Gojira at Wacken Open Air in Germany, August 2018

In 2018, the band achieved headlining status at heavy metal festivals. Gojira played a string of festival dates throughout the summer, including the Tuska Open Air Metal Festival, Brutal Assault Open Air, and Bloodstock Open Air. In early August 2018, Gojira played to the largest crowd of their career at Pol'and'Rock Festival in Kostrzyn nad Odrą, Poland. More than 400,000 people attended the festival. Nick John, who managed Gojira, Mastodon and Slayer, died of cancer on 8 September; John had managed Gojira since 2012.

On 16 January 2019, Gojira released its Pol'and'Rock Festival 2018 set on YouTube. That summer, they supported Slipknot on their US Knotfest Roadshow tour; Behemoth and Volbeat were also supporting acts. Gojira headlined the first day of the Hellfest Summer Open Air, one of Europe's largest metal festivals, on 21 June. On 2 November, they supported Deftones during their Dia De Los Deftones Festival with Chvrches, Youth Code, JPEGMafia and Brutus at San Diego's Petco Park.

=== Fortitude (2020–present) ===
In May 2020, Gojira streamed Live At Red Rocks on YouTube, their 2017 concert at Red Rocks Amphitheatre in Morrison, Colorado, to celebrate their thousandth performance. The band released "Another World", their first single in four years, on 5 August; it was their first Billboard-charting single. It peaked at No. 5 on the Hard Rock Digital Song Sales and No. 12 on the Hot Hard Rock Songs charts. Their performance at Hellfest 2019 was made available for streaming on YouTube in November 2020.

Gojira announced their seventh studio album, Fortitude, on 17 February 2021. Production had begun in early 2018 at Silver Cord Studio, and its original June 2020 release date had been postponed to September of that year due to the COVID-19 pandemic. Fortitude was called "one of 2021's most heavily anticipated metal releases". Gojira's 2021 single, "Amazonia", was released as part of a month-long fundraiser by the band for a Brazilian indigenous rights initiative. It peaked at No. 17 on the Billboard Hot Hard Rock Songs charts, and the band also placed the single "Born for One Thing" at No. 18.

Fortitude, produced and recorded by Joe Duplantier at Silver Cord Studio and mixed by Andy Wallace, was released on 30 April 2021 on Roadrunner Records. Sonically, the album contained an array of genres, tempos, and socially conscious songs, as they continued venturing into new territory while maintaining the band's trademark sound. Fortitude topped the US iTunes all-genre sales chart and debuted at No. 12 on the Billboard 200. It topped the Billboard Top Rock Albums and Hard Rock Albums charts. The album topped the Billboard Top Album Sales and Top Current Albums Sales charts with 27,372 album-equivalent units; 24,104 were album sales, making it the bestselling album in its opening week in the United States. Fortitude exceeded Magma's chart positions and sales. (Note: DJ Khaled's Khaled Khaled took the No. 1 spot on the Billboard 200 with 94,000 album-equivalent units, but 15,000 were pure sales. Gojira sold more traditional copies (24,104), outperforming DJ Khaled's new album. DJ Khaled's album-equivalent units included more streaming equivalent albums than Gojira, which helped him gain the highest chart position.) The album topped the UK Rock & Metal Albums chart. It reached No. 3 on the Australian Albums Chart and No. 8 on the German Albums Chart. Upon release, the album received critical praise reviews from music critics of The Guardian, Rolling Stone, Kerrang!, Metal Hammer, and Revolver. In mid-May 2021, "New Found" peaked at No. 24 on the Hot Hard Rock Songs charts; Gojira was No. 12 on the Billboard Artist 100.

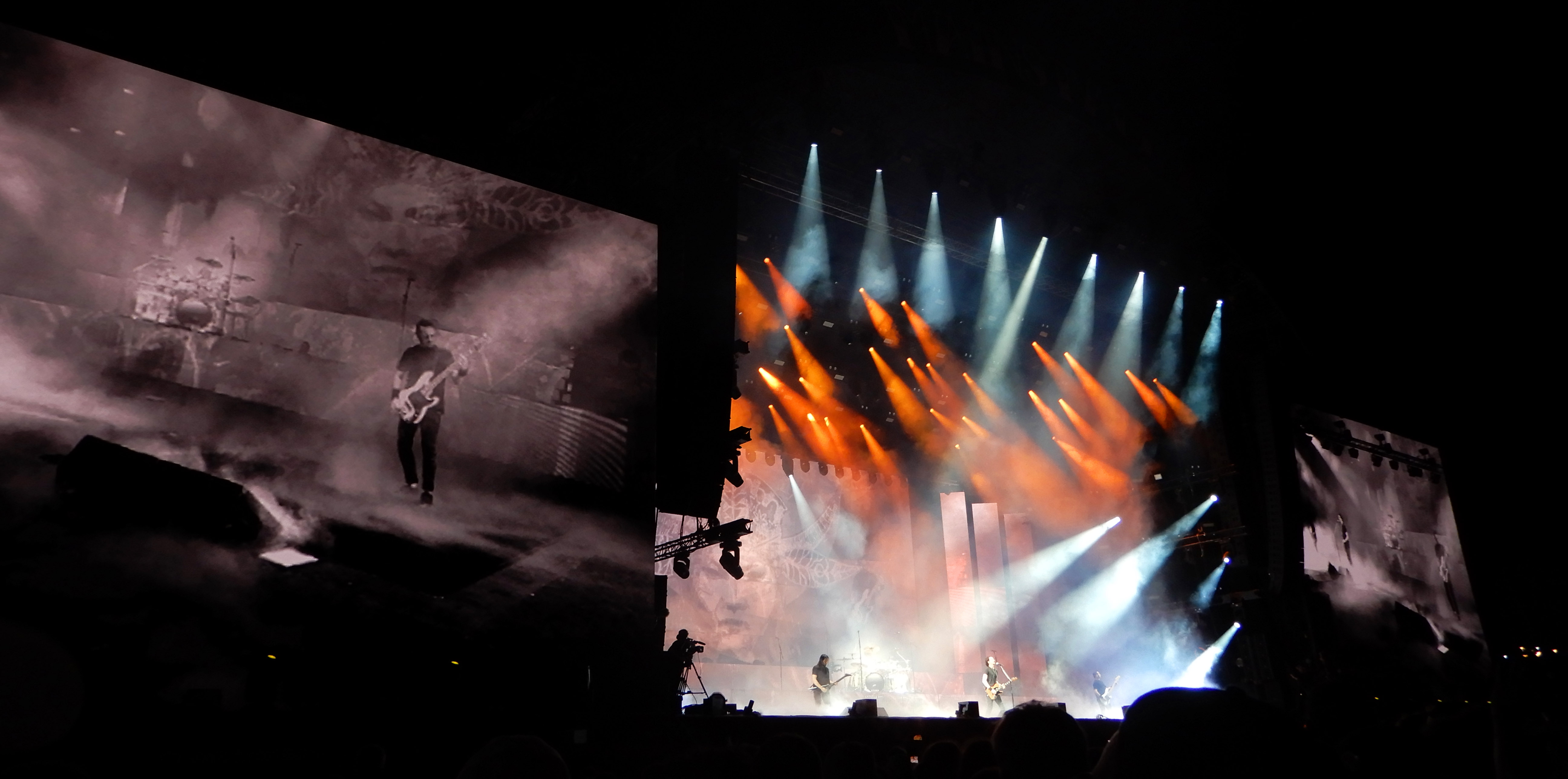
Gojira headlining Hellfest during the 2022 Fortitude Tour

Their headlining US tour commenced on 24 September. On 1 November, Lamb of God's Randy Blythe made a guest appearance at Gojira's concert in his hometown of Richmond, Virginia, which marked the first time they had performed "Adoration for None" live together. Gojira announced a UK and European headline tour from mid-January to mid-March 2022, with performances at the Tauron Arena Kraków, Motorpoint Arena Nottingham, and Cardiff International Arena, among other locations. The band also announced a three-date French arena tour, including the Accor Arena. It marked Gojira's first-ever headline arena shows in Europe and the UK. However, the tour was postponed to July 2022 and February 2023 due to Covid-19-related restrictions. "Amazonia" received a nomination for Best Metal Performance at the 2022 Grammy Awards. Andreu left Gojira on the remaining eight dates of their 2022 North American tour with Deftones to be present with his newborn child. They recruited Aldrick Guadagnino from the French band Klone to replace him temporarily from 18 to 28 May. On 19 June, Gojira headlined the third day of Hellfest Summer Open Air, performing to a crowd of 60,000. The band then went on a 4-date South America tour, including performances at the Movistar Arena and the Luna Park arena. (Note: A riot broke out at the entrance to the Caupolicán Theatre in Chile on 30 August 2022 when 80 fans attempted to enter the venue during the concert, which had sold out in less than 24 hours. This required the intervention of national police officers, and two security guards were injured.)

On 26 July 2024, Gojira performed at the 2024 Summer Olympics opening ceremony in Paris; their exhibition, held at the Conciergerie, consisted in a live rendition of French classic revolutionary song "Ça Ira", arranged in collaboration with Victor Le Masne, and performed with opera singer Marina Viotti. In the process, the band became the first hard rock or metal act to ever perform in an opening ceremony at the Olympic Games. On 30 August, Gojira released a studio version of their rendition, named "Mea Culpa (Ah! Ça ira!)", as a single on streaming services. In November, "Mea Culpa (Ah! Ça ira!)" was unveiled as a nominee for the Best Metal Performance at the 2025 Grammy Awards, their third nomination in the category, which they ultimately won.

In February 2026, the band was announced as part of the lineup for the Louder Than Life music festival in Louisville, scheduled to take place in September.

== Musical style and development ==
Metal is a music of passionate musicians. Its baseline is rock [music]. We come from Led Zeppelin, and push the limits of this music. When I was a teenager, I was fascinated by the technical and fast side of metal and I became addicted. It's an ambiguous style, which can have a disturbing image while being subtle and positive.

— Mario Duplantier

Gojira's sound blends several styles. Rooted in technical death metal, the band also incorporates thrash metal, groove metal, progressive metal, and post-metal. They have also incorporated math metal and avant-garde metal into their music. Magma marked a significant change in Gojira's sound. Writer Remfry Dedman said that the album "reinvented the band's signature death metal sound, introducing an accessible thread without compromising their raw intensity". Thus, some songs showcased musical traits associated with post-punk, neo-psychedelia, and leaning towards post-rock. The band's musical palette sometimes extends by stepping into progressive rock territory on quieter passages.

Gojira plays a technical, rhythmic style of heavy metal with polyrhythmic patterns, a fast double bass drum, blast beats, precision drumming, jazzy fills, and syncopated guitar riffs. Mario Duplantier's style on From Mars to Sirius and The Way of All Flesh was called a "paradise for drumophiles", and he has been considered Gojira's "anchor" since the group's inception. Their songs have "atypical" time signatures and uncommon song structures and display "technical precision" with a sonic characteristic described as "sheer heaviness". The band's sound is characterized by a pick-scrape technique that occurred spontaneously for the first time while playing "Embrace the World" during their 2003 The Link tour. Subsequently, the Gojira pick-scrape has become "a calling card" of the band. Joe Duplantier's first electric guitar, a Gibson Flying V, was used for guitar solos on albums. Andreu and Joe Duplantier's guitar playing includes tapping solo techniques, and on Magma, they introduced a new sonority with the use of the whammy pedal. Gojira creates textures and ambiences throughout their albums. They also use palm-muted guitar riffs and pinch harmonics. Minimalist, almost avant-garde guitar riffs occasionally appear, contrasting with intricate drum patterns. Their albums have been punctuated by instrumental interludes, which also feature non-musical sounds mingled with the band's music. Vocal styles vary, from the screaming technique often used in extreme metal to death metal's death growl, pitch screaming and clean vocals. Screams and clean vocals are sometimes combined to create an aggressive, melodic effect. Joe Duplantier's vocals feature a post-punk singing style in some of Gojira's songs.

=== Influences ===
Gojira was influenced by the early albums of Death, Metallica, Sepultura, Tool, and Morbid Angel, and have also cited Led Zeppelin and Rage Against the Machine's debut album as influences. Mario Duplantier called Death "an obligatory path; they are at the origin of death metal", and Andreu agreed: "It's our culture, we come from Death." One of Labadie's earliest influences was Metallica's Ride the Lightning, the first metal album he listened to at age eleven. Joe Duplantier said that "Ride the Lightning saved my life when I faced difficult times in high school" and has also cited Machine Head's 1994 album, Burn My Eyes, as an influence. He described Morbid Angel's 1993 album, Covenant, as "beautiful, and it's full of magic and epic brutality" and praised their 1995 album Domination. Other musical influences, to a lesser degree, include Slayer, Pantera, and Meshuggah. Gojira's music has been compared to that of Neurosis. In 2003, Joe Duplantier expressed admiration for Sade. By 2016, the band had admitted their interest in the music of the Beatles. Gojira also named Pink Floyd and Mike Oldfield as influences. On Fortitude, they focused on the lingering influence that the "classic" rock bands of the 1970s and 1980s had on them. The British sound continued to inspire the band's writing, citing Radiohead and trip hop act Portishead. In 2021, Joe Duplantier said that traditional rock, blues, and Americana had been childhood influences "reawakened" by long conversations with Mastodon guitarist Brent Hinds: "The older the other guys and I get, the more we appreciate it".

In recollecting the band's early history, Joe Duplantier explained how they were "nourished by the rock energy of the Basque Country, fairly unique in France," but, by contrast, compared it to the broader context of their lifestyle, secluded in a forest with their American musical influences while being detached from the local scene. He said: "Thus, we created our own language, our own musical codes. The Gojira sound comes from there." Andreu and Joe and Mario Duplantier described classical music as a particular inspiration; Andreu said, "I listen to 70 percent classical music". About Gojira's songs, which rely on syncopation and contretemps (on- and off-beats), Mario Duplantier said: "Joe and I were introduced to classical very early on. There was a love and an understanding of this music in the family. There is a strong link between metal and classical music through [their] solemn side and attention paid to existential subjects: life and death. Pop [music] is more focused on romantic feelings." The Duplantier brothers said that their upbringing in a Landes house "lost in the forest, with no neighbors," was reflected in Gojira's music and lyrics. Their father, Dominique Duplantier, was a French architectural drafter and painter; their mother, Patricia, was an American with Azorean roots. Mario Duplantier described his mother as

... a very free spirit, who has always encouraged our creativity. On the one hand, we had this extroverted mother who drew, sculpted, and made magnificent paintings out of driftwood; on the other hand [we had] a silent, 'workaholic' father who could spend whole days on gigantic drawings in Chinese ink with an almost-worrying rigor. These two aspects of our upbringing are found in Gojira, a mixture of discipline and something more extroverted, wacky, and chaotic.

=== Lyrical themes ===
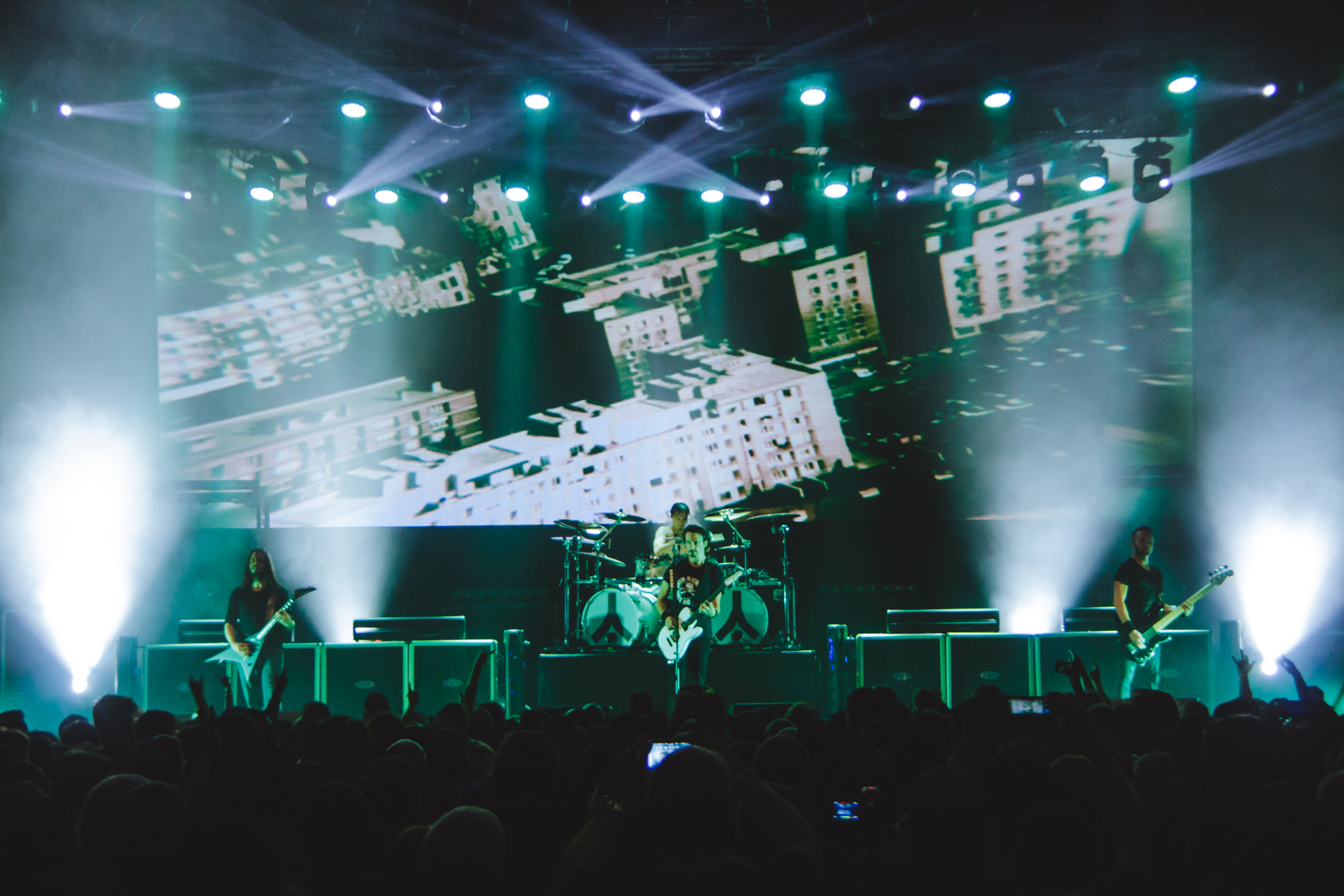
Spirituality, philosophy, and human domination over his environment are among the themes addressed in Gojira's songs

Gojira's lyrics address spirituality, life, death, rebirth, and nature. The band realized from the start that it could combine metal's "darkness" with Joe Duplantier's lyrics, which were inspired by the "mystery of nature", the environment, human nature and psychology. When Joe proposed a song entitled "Love", his fellow musicians were uncertain but the audience reaction was positive. Duplantier then wrote about his beliefs in reincarnation and the "existence of the soul". The band's lyrics revolve around the human condition and humanity's place in the world. Andreu said that to "speak and commit ourselves in the fields of ecology and spirituality is essential to the band."

From Mars to Sirius was a concept album about environmental issues, the death of Earth, and its "resurrection". Mario Duplantier said that the album's lyrics and title are "an allegory of [Joe's] desire to see humanity go from a destructive and masculine energy (symbolized by the warrior Mars) to an energy based on emotion and femininity". Gojira's lyrics have been described as philosophical "reflections on life". Mario Duplantier said about his brother's lyrics, "each album is a situational analysis of his life. I can see his convictions and his emotions of the moment by listening to our music again". The Way of All Flesh addressed the question of life after death. Joe Duplantier said, "That's the theme it's about death itself ... It's also about the immortality of the soul. That's the main subject for us." The title of L'Enfant Sauvage (The Wild Child), according to Joe Duplantier, could not be adequately conveyed in English: "Sauvage is something that is not educated or something that is like free and completely free in nature ... The idea with L'Enfant Sauvage is like with a human that would grow up in nature, raised by wolves, for example, without the influence from others and the influence from institutions or society in general." The album's title made an indirect reference to François Truffaut's 1970 film, The Wild Child, but Mario Duplantier said that "it is first and foremost about poetry".

Gojira is well known for environmentalism, and have used their lyrics and music videos to highlight climate change, marine pollution, and deforestation of the Amazon rainforest. The song "Global Warming" explore human impacts on the environment, and "Toxic Garbage Island" refers to the Great Pacific Garbage Patch, a trash vortex in the Pacific Ocean. "Amazonia" has been characterized by Alec Chillingworth of Metal Hammer as a protest song "amidst a discography littered with them". The band's members were raised in the southwest of France and French Basque Country (Pyrénées-Atlantiques). Thus, the rugged coastline and its surrounding scenic countryside inspired Gojira's interest in nature and the sea. Mario Duplantier has said that seeing oil spills in the nearby ocean inspired the band's interest in environmentalism. Joe Duplantier believes that songs can make concrete changes in environmental practices. In articulating his environmentalist position, he also shared a sense of anger and frustration with the corrupt political systems and financial crime. Paste called the song "Into the Storm" a "revolutionary anthem".

== Activism ==
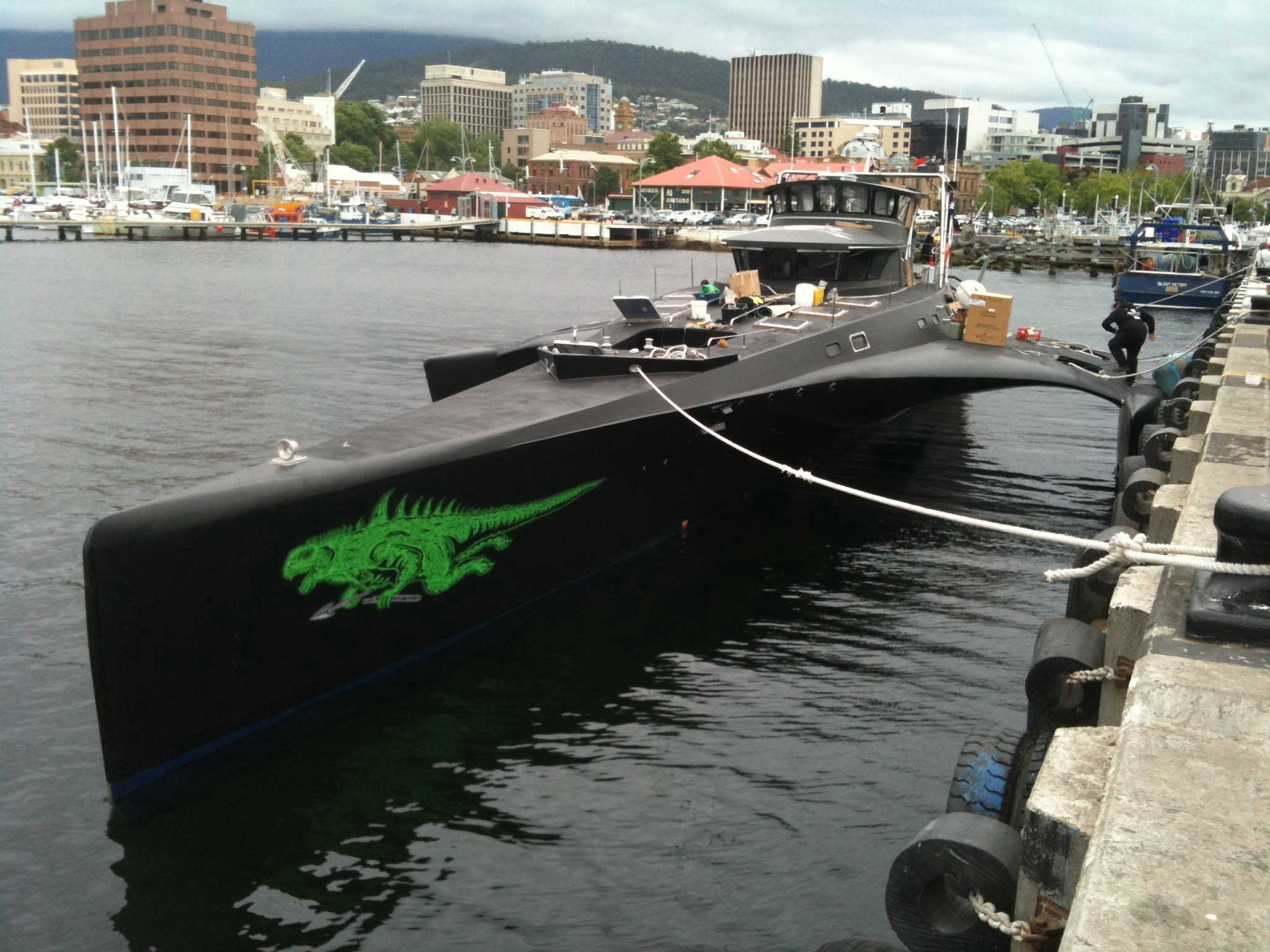
Sea Shepherd named MV Gojira after the band in recognition of their support of the charity.

Gojira was involved in action against injustices and social inequalities. For example, on 2 March 2004, a demonstration called Avis de KO Social (Social Knockout Notice) was organized by voluntary associations, labor unions, and NGOs to discuss, exchange views and protest at the Place de la Republique in central Paris against repressive policies undermining fundamental human rights and accentuating inequalities between the rich and the poor. Joe Duplantier advocated a moderate and constructive discourse, describing himself as "less refractory" than the other artists. A concert at the Zénith followed, and Gojira was the only metal band in the multi-genre lineup. All proceeds were donated to associations and organizations; Joe Duplantier cited specifically the Fight Against HIV/AIDS and Greenpeace.

The band has frequently supported environmental causes. Joe Duplantier has said if he was not a musician, he would be an environmental activist with Greenpeace or the Sea Shepherd Conservation Society. The band cooperates with Sea Shepherd to raise money for the organization's work to protect marine life, especially dolphins, whales, and sharks. Sea Shepherd named a $4 million interceptor vessel the MV Gojira before they were forced to rename it the MV Brigitte Bardot by Toho, the owners of the Godzilla/Gojira name. (Note: In 2010, the trimaran Ocean 7 Adventurer was purchased by Sea Shepherd and renamed MV Gojira to join "Operation No Compromise" in Antarctica. Sea Shepherd received legal pressure from the Japanese company that oversees the Godzilla–Gojira brand. MV Gojira was renamed MV Brigitte Bardot in honor of the French actress and animal activist Brigitte Bardot.) Members of both organizations may have a merchandise and literature booth at Gojira concerts.

Gojira participated in Le Cabaret Vert, a 2010 environmentally-friendly, multi-genre music festival in Charleville-Mézières, which aims to reduce its environmental impact. (Note: The band described itself as militant without pretending to call themselves ecologists and pointed out: "we take planes, cars, like everyone else. But we try to be eco-responsible".) Joe Duplantier expressed the band's support for Sea Shepherd and its founder, Paul Watson, when he appeared onstage between two Gojira songs at the June 2012 Rock am Ring Festival in Germany. Gojira was invited to perform at the 2015 Emmaüs Lescar-Pau festival in France, organized by the international movement to fight poverty and homelessness. The theme of the festival was: "the climate, an emergency, a commitment."

In 2017 and 2018, Mario Duplantier collaborated with the Los Angeles art team SceneFour to create a collection of canvases entitled Vers le Cosmos (Towards the Cosmos) from videos of him drumming with LED-lit drumsticks. Proceeds from the sale of one work were donated to The Ocean Cleanup, an organization which aims to rid the oceans of plastic waste.

Gojira released "Amazonia", their second single from Fortitude, on 26 March 2021. The song and its music video address the deforestation of the Amazon rainforest; the video depicts the 2019 Amazon rainforest wildfires, native Brazilians performing a ritual dance, and protests against the deforestation of the Amazon which have increased since Jair Bolsonaro became president in 2019. The band established a month-long fundraiser for the Brazilian indigenous rights charity Articulation of Indigenous People of Brazil (APIB), dedicated to those impacted by harassment, violence, forced labour, and loss of their native lands due to the deforestation of the Amazon region. The indigenously owned NGO APIB represents three hundred Brazilian indigenous groups. The campaign quadrupled its initial goal of $75,000 on 30 April 2021, raising more than $300,000 by selling autographed instruments and memorabilia from bands such as Metallica, Slash, Slayer, Tool, and Lamb of God. (Note: Bands that participated in Gojira's auction campaign also included Sepultura, Bring Me the Horizon, Korn, Mastodon, Rage Against the Machine, Slipknot, and Deftones.) Items in the auction included one of Slash's signature top hats, a signed Gibson "Appetite" Les Paul, and an autographed Fender Precision Bass used by Labadie during the recording of From Mars to Sirius. A guitar owned by Joe Dupantier was sold for $27,000.

The band's 2021 music video for "The Chant", filmed in West Bengal, was inspired by Tenzin Tsundue and depicts the refugee children of Tibet during its invasion by China in 1949 fleeing their country in the hope of preserving their culture. The music video was written and conceived by Joe Duplantier and directed by Russell Brownley. Discussing "The Chant", Joe Duplantier said that he felt a kinship with all indigenous traditions.

In 2021, Paris' Rock & Folk included Gojira in their global list of the "Top 10 Artists Committed to the Animal Cause".

== Other projects and collaborations ==
=== Empalot ===
The Duplantier brothers formed Empalot, an avant-garde metal–jazz fusion–funk rock band, in 1998 with Joe's friends from his high-school thrash metal band. Empalot had nine members, including two bass players, a guitarist, a saxophonist, an electronic keyboard player, a percussionist and a drummer. (Note: With live engineer Laurentx Etchemendy (saxophone) and lighting engineer Stéphane Chateauneuf (vocals); Chateauneuf appears in The Link Alive DVD's short show "Tchang & Tanguy" and the "Love" and "To Sirius" music videos.) Considered by the band the antithesis of Gojira because of its musical style and festive side, Empalot emphasized burlesque and self-deprecating humor. Mario Duplantier said, "It's funny, it's crazy. We had a blast doing it. Above all, it's a bunch of guys who share the same convictions, the same sense of humor and common values". For Joe Duplantier, Empalot evoked happiness and laughter.

Empalot released Brout, a 1999 demo album. The following year, they won the regional tremplin Ultrasons highlighting local bands. Empalot's first album, Tous aux Cèpes, was released in 2002. The band went on a regional underground tour from 1999 to 2004. An Empalot concert would attract an audience of 1,000 in their hometown, and the band performed in disguise and under fictitious names. (Note: Empalot toured with avant-garde French metal–fusion bands such as Psykup.) Empalot en Concert, a live album, was released in 2004 before the band went on hiatus.

=== Avec vautours ===
Gojira composed the music for Xabi Molia's short film, Avec vautours (With Vultures), in early 2003. It was filmed in the mountains of the French Basque country.

=== Maciste All'Inferno ===
In 2000, Alain Marty conceptualized the Printemps des Cinéconcerts (CineConcerts' Springtime), a series of film concerts in Bordeaux where regional artists of various musical genres and styles were invited to integrate their music with pre-selected films for two-week shows. In 2003, Gojira received a request from Marty to compose the instrumental music for Maciste in Hell, a 1925 Italian black-and-white silent film directed by Guido Brignone, and to perform it at the Rock School Barbey, a former Bordeaux theater.

That year, the band performed their music in two sold-out performances in front of the film screened at the theater. Gojira's fifty-minute one-night show of avant-garde metal was recorded and released later in 2003 as an album entitled Maciste All'Inferno. In a 2008 interview, Mario Duplantier expressed his hope to release a second version as a fully-fledged Gojira album.

=== Cavalera Conspiracy ===
Max and Igor Cavalera, the founding brothers of the Brazilian band Sepultura, wanted to recruit a bass player for Cavalera Conspiracy (their new band) in 2007. Labadie was chosen through Roadrunner Records, but could not accept the offer for family reasons. Joe Duplantier called Gloria Cavalera, and he was invited to play bass. He met Logan Mader, recording engineer on The Way of All Flesh in 2008, while recording with Cavalera Conspiracy in Los Angeles. Joe performed with the band on 31 August 2007 at the 11th annual D-Low Memorial Show at the Marquee Theatre in Tempe, Arizona, a concert for Dana "D-Low" Wells (Max Cavalera's stepson, who was killed in a 1996 car crash).

The album Inflikted was released in March 2008, and a tour followed several months later. Touring with Cavalera Conspiracy became problematic for Joe Duplantier, who preferred to concentrate on recording The Way of All Flesh and its promotion: "I put everything in Gojira, my whole life."

=== Unreleased Sea Shepherd EP ===
In early November 2010, Gojira entered a Los Angeles studio with producer Logan Mader to begin recording a four-song extended play whose proceeds would benefit the Sea Shepherd Conservation Society, an anti-whaling organization. The EP would feature guest appearances from the international metal scene; sales were expected on the Gojira website "without going through traditional ways", said Joe Duplantier.

As a preview of the Sea Shepherd EP, Gojira released "Of Blood And Salt" in May 2011 and appeared on a Metal Hammer UK sampler album with guest vocalist Devin Townsend and a guest guitar solo by Meshuggah's Fredrik Thordendal. The other tracks featured Brent Hinds, Randy Blythe, Anders Fridén, and Max Cavalera. The EP was originally intended for release in August and September 2011; it was never released, however, because the hard drive which contained the recordings crashed.

=== Olympic Games ===
Gojira played at the 2024 Summer Olympics opening ceremony in Paris, France, on 26 July 2024, becoming the first metal band to ever play at the opening ceremony. Their performance from the Conciergerie, on the bank of the Seine, included depictions of a decapitated Marie Antoinette, and the band played a heavy metal rendition of "Ah! Ça Ira!", a revolutionary song that was popular during the French Revolution. Aside from metal news websites and magazines, Gojira's performance made headlines in many news outlets as the first metal band ever to play in an Olympic opening ceremony, delivering an epic rendition of an old song.

At the 67th Annual Grammy Awards, the band, together with Franco-Swiss opera singer Marina Viotti and French composer Victor Le Masne, awon the Grammy Award for the best metal performance with their performance of "Mea Culpa (Ah! Ça ira!)" at the Opening Ceremony of the Olympic Games Paris 2024.

== Legacy and influence ==
Gojira was ranked sixth on Paris magazine L'Express' 2009 list of the top 10 best-selling French music artists in the US. In 2012, Gojira was top-ranked in the French metal category by the Cultural Services of the French Embassy in the US. By August 2016, the band was one of France's biggest rock exports to the US. French national newspaper Le Monde said in 2016 that Gojira was the country's first metal band to reach international status without support from the Institut Français, which promotes French culture abroad. (Note: Mario Duplantier noted that France "is rather a country of chansons (French language as an instrument) with chanteurs à texte (lyric-driven French singers – dramatic singers), and it is fine like that". French politician Patrick Roy, who championed heavy metal several times in the hemicycle of the National Assembly, challenged Minister of Culture Frédéric Mitterrand there in 2010 and suggested he listen to Gojira, as well as Metallica, Epica, Opeth, Adagio, and Mass Hysteria.)

Gojira has influenced bands and musicians such as the Agonist, Alien Weaponry, Avatar, Betraying the Martyrs, Black Crown Initiate, the Contortionist, Erra, Fit for an Autopsy, Hypno5e, Jinjer, Tallah drummer Max Portnoy, Miss May I, Rolo Tomassi, and Thy Art Is Murder. While the band garnered international attention through the release of From Mars to Sirius, vocalist Will Garner of the rock band Black Peaks said that Gojira changed his "perception of music". Vocalist and guitarist Josh Middleton of Sylosis said that his vocal approach was inspired by Gojira: "when From Mars to Sirius came out, this album was huge for most people who love heavy music ... There are a lot of very melodic screams on this album, it seems like there is always a height in [Joe Duplantier's] singing, and that influenced me enormously". Tesseract lead guitarist Acle Kahney said that touring with Gojira influenced the "darker tone" of his band's fourth studio album. Myles Kennedy explained his inspiration in composing Alter Bridge's song, "Native Son": "When I wrote that riff, I had certainly been listening to a lot of Gojira". Norwegian singer Aurora said that she was inspired by the band's lyrics, and "Gojira is my favorite band of all time". Jinjer's Tatiana Shmayluk and Aurora have said that they would like to collaborate with the band. Spiritbox and Trivium have incorporated the "Gojira-esque pick scrape technique" into their music, according to Guitar World and Billboard. Niklas Karlsson of Orbit Culture said that their sound and music was "A mixture of Metallica and Gojira", whom he described as having a considerable influence on the band, saying, "Without either band, Orbit Culture simply would not exist." Born of Osiris guitarist Lee McKinney cited The Way of All Flesh as his inspiration and one of his five favorite progressive metal albums. He praised the album for its technical compositions and described the musical structure complexity of "The Art of Dying" as "Absolutely astonishing."

Writing for Metal Hammer, Luke Morton noticed how Gojira gradually rose to prominence over the decades at a constant pace. After their headlining show at Bloodstock Open Air in 2018, he credited the band as having "cemented themselves as one of the best metal bands in the world". In 2019, Kennedy called Gojira "the most important metal band out there right now"; he also said, "They're very important to the evolution of where things are going with hard rock and metal". In December 2019, "Stranded" was ranked No. 8 on Guitar World's list of the decade's 20 best guitar riffs. In January 2020, Alternative Press included "Toxic Garbage Island" in the list of the "Top 50 metal songs from the past 20 years" and deemed it "one of the best metal songs of all time". Kerrang! listed Joe Duplantier's tapping in "Silvera" among "The 20 Best Guitar Solos Of The 2010s". In 2020, Stereogum called Gojira "one of this century's most important underground metal institutions": "The band figured out a way to weld the grimy, mathy complications of technical death metal to the grand, mathy complications of prog-rock, and they quickly became the kind of band that other bands mythologize." In April 2021, they were called "the band of the decade" by Metal Hammer. In June 2021, Brad Angle of Guitar World called Gojira "titans of groove metal: progressive, heavy-hitting riff giants", adding that they continue "in the lineage of Metallica, Sepultura, Pantera, Lamb of God and others". The Guardian ranked "Amazonia" at No. 8 on its list of "The greatest songs about the climate crisis". "L'Enfant Sauvage" was listed in Revolver's "15 Greatest Title Tracks in Metal History". From Mars to Sirius was ranked at No. 10 and L'Enfant Sauvage at No. 44 on the Loudwire "100 Best Rock + Metal Albums of the 21st Century" list. Will Hodgkinson of The Times dubbed Gojira the "French metal masters" after attending a 2023 show.

Three Jurassic-era brittle star fossils, Ophiogojira labadiei, Ophiogojira andreui, and Ophioduplantiera noctiluca, were named after band members by scientists Ben Thuy and Lea Numberger from the National Museum of Natural History, Luxembourg, and Tania Pineda-Enríquez from the Florida Museum of Natural History. They wrote that the genus Ophiogojira was named in honor of Gojira "for producing songs of an unfathomable intensity, beautifully dark and heavy, and exploring the abyss of life and death, of human strength and error, and of thriving and yet threatened oceans."

== Band members ==
Current

- Joe Duplantier − vocals, guitar (1996–present)
- Mario Duplantier − drums (1996–present)
- Christian Andreu − guitar (1996–present)
- Jean-Michel Labadie − bass guitar (1998–present)

Former touring substitutes

- Aldrick Guadagnino − guitar (2022; substitute for Christian Andreu)
- Greg Kubacki – guitar (2025; substitute for Joe Duplantier)
- Luigi Paraventi – drums (2026; substitute for Mario Duplantier)

Former

- Alexandre Cornillon − bass guitar (1996–1998)

== Discography ==
Studio albums

- Terra Incognita (2001)
- The Link (2003)
- From Mars to Sirius (2005)
- The Way of All Flesh (2008)
- L'Enfant Sauvage (2012)
- Magma (2016)
- Fortitude (2021)

== Awards and nominations ==
=== Epiphone Revolver Golden Gods Music Awards ===
Year	Nominee / work	Award	Result	Ref.
2013	L'Enfant Sauvage	Album of the Year	Nominated	
2013	Mario Duplantier	Best Drummer	Nominated	
2016	"Silvera"	Best Film/Video	Won	

=== GAFFA Awards (Denmark) ===
The GAFFA Awards (Danish: GAFFA-Prisen) is an annual Danish awards ceremony delivered since 1991 for Danish and international music.

Year	Nominee / work	Award	Result	Ref.
2022	Fortitude	International Release of the Year	Nominated	

=== Grammy Awards ===
Year	Nominee / work	Award	Result	Ref.
2017	"Silvera"	Best Metal Performance	Nominated	
2017	Magma	Best Rock Album	Nominated	
2022	"Amazonia"	Best Metal Performance	Nominated	
2025	"Mea Culpa (Ah! Ça ira!)"	Best Metal Performance	Won	

=== Heavy Music Awards ===
The Heavy Music Awards is an annual awards ceremony in partnership with Amazon Music and Ticketmaster.

Year	Nominee / work	Award	Result	Ref.
2017	Gojira	Best International Band	Won	
2018	Gojira	Best Live Band	Won	

=== Loudwire Music Awards ===
Year	Nominee / work	Award	Result	Ref.
2012	L'Enfant Sauvage	Metal Album of the Year	Nominated	
2012	Mario Duplantier	Drummer of the Year	Nominated	
2012	Joe Duplantier	Vocalist of the Year	Nominated	
2016	Mario Duplantier	Best Drummer of the Year	Nominated	
2016	Joe Duplantier	Best Vocalist of the Year	Nominated	
2016	Magma	Best Metal Album	Nominated	
2016	"Silvera"	Best Metal Song	Nominated	
2016	Gojira	Best Metal Band of the Year	Nominated	
2016	Gojira	Best Live Act	Nominated	
2017	Mario Duplantier	Best Drummer	Won	

=== Metal Hammer Golden Gods Awards ===
Year	Nominee / work	Award	Result	Ref.
2013	Gojira	Best Live Band	Won	
2016	Joe Duplantier	Dimebag Darrell Shredder Award	Nominated	
2017	Magma	Best Album	Won	

=== Rhythm MusicRadar Awards ===
The MusicRadar Awards is an annual awards ceremony in association with Rhythm magazine to celebrate drummers.

Year	Nominee / work	Award	Result	Ref.
2016	Mario Duplantier	Best Metal Drummer	Won	
2020	Mario Duplantier	Best Metal Drummer	Nominated	
2021	Mario Duplantier	Best Metal Drummer	Won	
