= From Mars to Sirius =

Studio album by Gojira
- Released: 27 September 2005
- Recorded: 2004–2005
- Studios: Studio des Milans (Ondres); Le Florida (Agen)
- Genres: Technical death metal; progressive metal; groove metal; post-metal
- Length: 66:52
- Labels: Listenable, Prosthetic
- Producer: Gabriel Editions

Gojira chronology
Maciste All'Inferno (2004)	From Mars to Sirius (2005)	The Way of All Flesh (2008)

From Mars to Sirius is the third studio album by French heavy metal band Gojira. It is a concept album addressing environmental issues and the rebirth of a dead planet through a space travel storyline, with the underlying theme of a transition from war to peace. From Mars to Sirius was released in 2005 to critical acclaim. It has since been ranked amongst the Rolling Stone's 100 Greatest Metal Albums of All Time.

== Writing, recording, production ==
The album was largely written by Joe and Mario Duplantier, but Christian Andreu contributed certain parts such as the outro of "Where Dragons Dwell" and the central melody on "World to Come". According to Mario, the album was entirely self-produced by the band. Jean-Michel Labadie was involved in the production, especially on the coherence of his bass in the compositions, and with his work the band sought "to bring a much warmer note into their sound". Gojira had emphasized more interludes and melodies in this album. Joe Duplantier said that From Mars to Sirius represented a journey; saying, "and as in every journey, there are air gaps, variations and moments of calm".

After the recording of Terra Incognita made in ten days in a studio in Brussels, the band decided to build their own studio called, Le Studio des Milans, located in their hometown, where From Mars to Sirius would be recorded. The drum recordings were made at Le Florida in Agen.

Prior to the album's release date, the band performed two songs at concerts in France, "Backbone" and "The Heaviest Matter of the Universe". The mastering of the album was completed in mid-July 2005.

== Concept and artwork ==
"Ocean Planet"
Sample of "Ocean Planet". The album was the narrative of a metaphorical journey to the "ocean planet" Sirius C.

A concept album, From Mars to Sirius relates the resurrection of a dead planet through an interplanetary quest, tackling environmental issues such as climate change and impacts on marine life as well as broader themes of life, death, and rebirth. Explaining the meaning behind the album title, Joe Duplantier said in an interview that "In some cultures, Mars symbolizes war and Sirius peace. I'm simplifying! It is a journey of a state of war, even if in France we are preserved, but it can be a war within us, in our flesh, in our mind, a war with ourselves".

The song "Flying Whales" is "a homage" to whales and their intelligence. The concept emerged during the second album's tour and resulted in the imagery and artwork for From Mars to Sirius. The cover art was created by Joe Duplantier.

== Release ==
Listenable Records reissued the album on vinyl in September 2012 and in November 2015 in limited quantities. A 10th anniversary box-set was released on 12 February 2016, again through Listenable Records. A video directed by Alain Duplantier was filmed for the song "To Sirius".

== Critical reception and legacy ==
Professional ratings
Review scores
Source	Rating
About.com	4/5 stars
AllMusic	4/5 stars
The A.V. Club	B
Blabbermouth.net	9/10
Decibel	8/10
Exclaim!	favorable
Phoenix New Times	favorable
Hard N'Heavy Magazine	5/5 stars
Rock Hard	8.5/10
Sputnikmusic	4.5/5 stars

From Mars to Sirius was received positively by critics. AllMusic's Eduardo Rivadavia noted the influences of bands such as Pantera, Meshuggah, and Neurosis on the album, particularly in the guitar work and emphasis on atmosphere. Heaping praise on the album, Rivadavia wrote that "the fluidity with which utmost heaviness and delicate melodies were made to coexist within the scope of single songs like 'Where Dragons Dwell', 'Flying Whales', and 'World to Come', was truly astonishing—as was the surprisingly seamless flow accomplished by the sequencing of these wildly disparate tracks, and the thematically conjoined esoteric subjects undertaken throughout. The final outcome was still not easy to digest, and admittedly just a tad bit overlong (Gojira's next challenge was definitely to be a little more concise), but compared to most of the impossibly dense (and often exhausting) prog metal available, From Mars to Sirius, struck a close to perfect balance between degree of difficulty and ultimate reward."

Blabbermouth.net's Keith Bergman made similar comparisons to Meshuggah and Neurosis, but wrote that "A grocery list of influences does Gojira no justice" and that "This is a masterpiece on par with anything Meshuggah or Mastodon have released." He described their musical style as "dark, churning and hypnotic, massively heavy but varied and surprising, never monotonous"; and their lyrics as "surprisingly positive and life-affirming, their words add humanity to even the most angry, mechanized portions of the album." Bergman concluded his review by praising From Mars to Sirius as an "immense, intense, and very impressive album."

Chad Bowar of About.com commented that the album combine "extreme and heavy, but also has a lot of progressive elements", while "some songs are pure death metal, others much more mellow and atmospheric". Noel Murray of The A.V. Club also viewed that it presents Gojira in two style: "between the bouts of sonic violence, Gojira finds time for the spare instrumental". Niki D'Andrea of Phoenix New Times stated, "Quite simply, in a genre that usually sounds crunchy and confined, Gojira sounds huge, like the conscientious monster it is".

Rolling Stone named the album No. 97 on their list of the Top 100 Greatest Metal Albums of All Time, and MetalSucks named it no. 9 on their list of the 21 Best Metal Albums of the 21st Century. Loudwire ranked it as the 15th best progressive metal album of all time, and named it the second-best metal album of 2005 in a retrospective list. Metal Hammer named this album No. 15 out of The 100 Greatest Metal Albums of the 21st Century. AllMusic's Eduardo Rivadavia describes the album as marking a turning point for the band, "gaining them access into the exclusive top echelon of the world's progressive metal elite." In 2018, Decibel inducted the album into their hall of fame.

Loudwire included "Flying Whales" on their list of the 66 Best Metal Songs of the 21st Century (list sorted by year). Graham Hartmann said it utilized "one of the best riffs and breakdowns of the century", adding that the song "becomes more iconic as the years pass, stretching the limits of what a metal band can achieve without clean vocals or flashy guitar solos". Rolling Stone included the song in their list of the 100 Greatest Heavy Metal Songs, ranking it at number 70.

== Track listing ==
All lyrics are written by Joe Duplantier; all music is composed by Gojira.

From Mars to Sirius track listing
No.	Title	Length
1.	"Ocean Planet"	5:32
2.	"Backbone"	4:18
3.	"From the Sky"	5:48
4.	"Unicorn" (instrumental)	2:09
5.	"Where Dragons Dwell"	6:54
6.	"The Heaviest Matter of the Universe"	3:57
7.	"Flying Whales"	7:44
8.	"In the Wilderness"	7:47
9.	"World to Come"	6:52
10.	"From Mars"	2:24
11.	"To Sirius"	5:37
12.	"Global Warming"	7:50
Total length:		66:52

Japanese bonus track
No.	Title	Writer(s)	Length
13.	"Escape" (Metallica cover)	James Hetfield; Lars Ulrich; Kirk Hammett	5:00
Total length:			71:52

== Personnel ==
Personnel taken from CD booklet.

=== Gojira ===
- Joe Duplantier – vocals, guitars
- Christian Andreu – guitars
- Jean-Michel Labadie – bass guitar
- Mario Duplantier – drums

=== Technical personnel ===
- Gabriel Editions – production
- Laurent Etchemendy – engineering, mixing
- Joe Duplantier – mixing, artwork
- Jean-Michel Labadie – mixing
- Jean-Pierre Chalbos – mastering
- Seb Dupuis – mastering

== Charts ==
Chart performance for From Mars to Sirius
Chart (2005)	Peak position
French Albums (SNEP)	44
