= Les Enfants Sauvages =

Live album (DVD) by Gojira
- Released: 11 March 2014
- Recorded: 2013
- Genres: Progressive metal, technical death metal, groove metal
- Length: 56:40
- Label: Roadrunner

Gojira chronology
L'Enfant Sauvage (2012)	Les Enfants Sauvages (2014)	Magma (2016)

Les Enfants Sauvages (French for "The Wild Children") is the third live album by French heavy metal band Gojira that was released in 2014. It was released as a CD/DVD set in a 60-page hardcover photo book.

== Track listing ==
CD/DVD

Brixton Academy, London: March 29, 2013
No.	Title	Length
1.	"Intro"	1:24
2.	"Explosia"	5:12
3.	"Flying Whales"	5:23
4.	"Backbone"	5:17
5.	"The Heaviest Matter of the Universe"	4:43
6.	"L’Enfant Sauvage"	3:37
7.	"Toxic Garbage Island"	4:43
8.	"Wisdom Comes"	2:53
9.	"Jam"	2:07
10.	"Oroborus"	4:36
11.	"Drum Solo"	3:14
12.	"The Axe"	7:19
13.	"The Gift of Guilt"	6:12
Total length:		56:40
