= The Flesh Alive =

Live album (DVD) by Gojira
- Released: 4 June 2012 (Europe)
- Recorded: 2012
- Genre: Progressive metal; technical death metal; groove metal
- Length: 253:00
- Label: Mascot Records

Gojira chronology
The Way of All Flesh (2008)	The Flesh Alive (2012)	L'Enfant Sauvage (2012)

DVD cover

The Flesh Alive is the second live album by French heavy metal band Gojira. It was released in 2012 on Mascot Label. Most of the tracks are taken from the album The Way of All Flesh.

== Commercial performance ==
The Flesh Alive peaked at No. 76 on the France Top Albums chart. The live DVD set debuted at No. 24 on the Dutch DVD Music Top 30 in the Netherlands. It entered at No. 10 on the Ultratop Belgian chart and moved up to number No. 7 one week later. The Flesh Alive debuted at No. 13 on the Billboard Top DVD Music Videos chart, selling 800 copies in its first week of release in the US.

== Track listing ==
DVD 1 / Blu-ray

Garorock Show (93 min, Marmande, 4 April 2009):
No.	Title	Length
1.	"Oroborus"	4:49
2.	"The Heaviest Matter of the Universe"	4:30
3.	"Backbone"	4:49
4.	"Love"	4:58
5.	"From the Sky"	5:40
6.	"A Sight to Behold"	5:32
7.	"The Art of Dying"	8:32
8.	"Drum Solo"	1:09
9.	"Clone"	5:56
10.	"Flying Whales"	5:53
11.	"The Way of All Flesh"	7:53
12.	"Terra Incognita"	3:57
13.	"Vacuity"	6:02
Total length:		69:40

Les Vieilles Charrues Show (15 min, Carhaix, 17 July 2010):
No.	Title	Length
1.	"Indians"	3:53
2.	"Toxic Garbage Island"	5:52
3.	"World to Come"	6:51
Total length:		16:36

DVD 2

Bordeaux (80 min, Rock School Barbey, 9 February 2009):
No.	Title	Length
1.	"Oroborus"	5:18
2.	"The Heaviest Matter of the Universe"	4:12
3.	"Backbone"	4:29
4.	"Love"	5:38
5.	"From the Sky"	5:37
6.	"A Sight to Behold"	5:32
7.	"The Art of Dying"	8:37
8.	"Drum Solo"	1:38
9.	"Clone"	5:23
10.	"Flying Whales"	6:09
11.	"Toxic Garbage Island"	4:23
12.	"The Way of All Flesh"	8:47
13.	"Terra Incognita"	3:25
14.	"Vacuity"	9:28
Total length:		78:36

- Documental: “The Way of All Flesh Inside” (62 min):

BONUS CD (65 min) + Screensavers:
No.	Title	Length
1.	"Intro"	1:34
2.	"Oroborus"	4:48
3.	"The Heaviest Matter of the Universe"	4:07
4.	"Backbone"	4:15
5.	"Love"	4:51
6.	"From the Sky"	5:39
7.	"A Sight to Behold"	5:32
8.	"The Art of Dying"	8:36
9.	"Clone"	4:42
10.	"Flying Whales"	5:21
11.	"The Way of All Flesh"	7:40
12.	"Terra Incognita"	3:31
13.	"Vacuity"	5:09
Total length:		65:45
