= Ondres =

- Commune
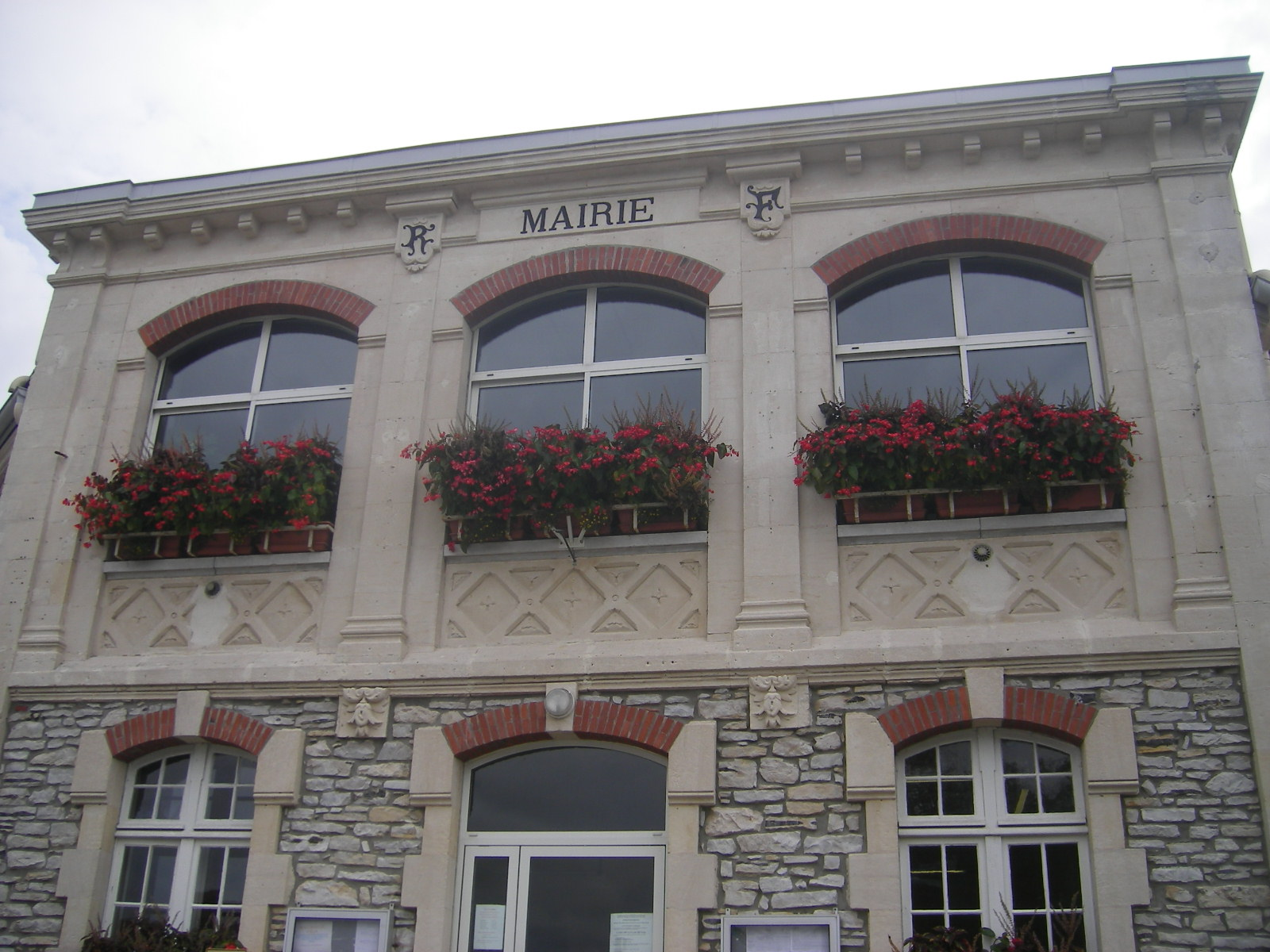
- Town hall
- Location of Ondres
- Location within France Location within Nouvelle-Aquitaine
- Coordinates: 43°33′42″N 1°26′54″W
- Country: France
- Region: Nouvelle-Aquitaine
- Department: Landes
- Arrondissement: Dax
- Canton: Seignanx
- Intercommunality: Seignanx

Government
  - Mayor (2020–2026): Eva Belin
- Area^{1}: 15.13 km^{2} (5.84 sq mi)
- Elevation: 46 m (151 ft)
- Highest elevation: 53 m (174 ft)
- Lowest elevation: 3 m (9.8 ft)
- Population (2023): 6,533
  - Density: 431.8/km^{2} (1,118/sq mi)
- Time zone: UTC+01:00 (CET)
  - Summer (DST): UTC+02:00 (CEST)
- INSEE/Postal code: 40209 /40440
- ^{1} French Land Register data, which excludes lakes, ponds, glaciers > 1 km^{2} (0.386 sq mi or 247 acres) and river estuaries.

Ondres (French pronunciation: [ɔ̃dʁ]; Occitan pronunciation: [ˈunðres]) is a commune in the Landes department in Nouvelle-Aquitaine in southwestern France. It is only two miles from the nearest beach (Ondres plage), which is well known for being a good surfing spot.

== Population ==
Historical population

| Year | Pop. | ±% p.a. |
|---|---|---|
| 1793 | 450 | — |
| 1800 | 554 | +3.01% |
| 1806 | 613 | +1.70% |
| 1821 | 739 | +1.25% |
| 1831 | 1,003 | +3.10% |
| 1836 | 1,026 | +0.45% |
| 1841 | 1,047 | +0.41% |
| 1846 | 1,037 | −0.19% |
| 1851 | 1,069 | +0.61% |
| 1856 | 1,169 | +1.80% |
| 1861 | 1,228 | +0.99% |
| 1866 | 1,302 | +1.18% |
| 1872 | 1,207 | −1.25% |
| 1876 | 1,208 | +0.02% |
| 1881 | 1,218 | +0.17% |
| 1886 | 1,309 | +1.45% |
| 1891 | 1,347 | +0.57% |
| 1896 | 1,335 | −0.18% |
| 1901 | 1,331 | −0.06% |

| Year | Pop. | ±% p.a. |
|---|---|---|
| 1906 | 1,402 | +1.04% |
| 1911 | 1,414 | +0.17% |
| 1921 | 1,256 | −1.18% |
| 1926 | 1,265 | +0.14% |
| 1931 | 1,246 | −0.30% |
| 1936 | 1,227 | −0.31% |
| 1946 | 1,429 | +1.54% |
| 1954 | 1,278 | −1.39% |
| 1962 | 1,419 | +1.32% |
| 1968 | 1,523 | +1.19% |
| 1975 | 2,073 | +4.50% |
| 1982 | 2,704 | +3.87% |
| 1990 | 3,100 | +1.72% |
| 1999 | 3,650 | +1.83% |
| 2007 | 4,328 | +2.15% |
| 2012 | 4,707 | +1.69% |
| 2017 | 5,358 | +2.62% |
| 2023 | 6,533 | +3.36% |

Source: EHESS and INSEE (1968-2023)

== Culture ==
Ondres is the home town of architectural drafter and painter Dominique Duplantier, who graduated from the École des Beaux-Arts of Paris. Duplantier draws landscapes and traditional homes of the Basque Country and southwest France. He is the father of Joe and Mario of the heavy metal band Gojira, and of the photographer Gabrielle Duplantier.

== See also ==
- Communes of the Landes department
