= L'Enfant sauvage (album) =

Studio album by Gojira
- Released: 26 June 2012
- Recorded: 2011–2012
- Studios: Le Studio des Milans, France; Spin Studios, Long Island City, Queens, New York
- Genres: Progressive metal; technical death metal; groove metal
- Length: 52:24
- Label: Roadrunner
- Producers: Josh Wilbur; Joe Duplantier

Gojira chronology
The Flesh Alive (2012)	L'Enfant sauvage (2012)	Les Enfants Sauvages (2014)

Singles from L'Enfant sauvage
- 1. "L'Enfant sauvage" Released: 27 April 2012; 2. "Liquid Fire" Released: 4 June 2012; 3. "The Axe" Released: 18 September 2012; 4. "Explosia" Released: 27 September 2012; 5. "Born in Winter" Released: 25 March 2014

L'Enfant sauvage (French for "The Wild Child") is the fifth studio album and major label debut by French heavy metal band Gojira. It was released 26 June 2012 via Roadrunner Records.

== Background ==
Gojira was going to tour with Lamb of God and Dethklok, but because of Randy Blythe's arrest in the Czech Republic, the tour was cancelled. Gojira subsequently announced a headline tour of their own, which began in January 2013 with support from The Devin Townsend Project and The Atlas Moth.

== Writing and composition ==
The composition and pre-production of L'Enfant Sauvage were materialized in the southwest of France (Le Studio des Milans). Gojira opted for more "power" and density of sound and emphasized more "epicness" in the structures of the songs. It was co-produced and recorded by Josh Wilbur and Joe Duplantier in New York.

L'Enfant sauvage is partly inspired by François Truffaut's film of the same name, which tells the true story of Victor of Aveyron, a child who was found alone in the woods with behaviors closer to a wild animal than a civilized human. "We are part of this world. And also there is this idea that an enfant sauvage, a child that grew up in nature, is not confronted with others, with emotions, with guilt and identity, so it would be a state where you are closer to the essence of things."

Frontman, guitarist, and songwriter Joe Duplantier spoke about the meaning of the album by saying, "When you become a musician, you don't have a boss telling you what to do so you have to be very responsible." He goes on to say "With freedom comes responsibility, so I'm asking myself, 'What is freedom? What does it mean to me?' L'Enfant Sauvage reflects on that. There's no answer though. There's just life and questions."

Duplantier expanded on this idea in an interview with The Quietus, explaining that "Since the beginning, since the very first demo even, I've been obsessed with the human condition, the soul, why we are here and is there an answer to that question - the mysteries of life in general. Are we a body? Or are we more than that? And if we are more, then what are we? I'm full of questions, but there are no answers really, just intuition, and a strong intuition that we are more than just flesh and blood".

The song "The Gift of Guilt" was a reflection of Joe Duplantier on the theme of guilt, passed down from generation to generation.

During the recording of the album, Joe Duplantier became a father. "It's a trip man, it's amazing. Of course I'm very influenced by what happened and talking about birth and becoming a dad is not completely disconnected, it's relevant in a way, but everything is influencing me when I'm writing."

== Touring and promotion ==
On 30 April 2012, the band performed a new song for the forthcoming album, the title track "L'Enfant sauvage", at Rockstore in Montpellier. Music and lyric videos have been released for five songs off the album: "Explosia", "L'Enfant Sauvage", "The Axe", "Liquid Fire", and "Born in Winter".

The band toured North America in support of the album with the Devin Townsend Project and The Atlas Moth in 2013, and also launched a worldwide tour. In March 2014 the band released a DVD/CD live album of their performance at the Brixton Academy in London on 24 March 2013 entitled Les Enfants Sauvages through Roadrunner. It also featured a 60-page hardcover book featuring photographs of the band taken around the world in the course of the last few years of their touring, spanning over 150 shows.

== Reception ==
=== Critical reception ===
Professional ratings
Aggregate scores
Source	Rating
Metacritic	86/100
Review scores
Source	Rating
AllMusic	3.5/5 stars
Alternative Press	4/5 stars
The A.V. Club	A−
Blabbermouth.net	9.5/10
The Guardian	5/5 stars
Kerrang!	4/5 stars
Pitchfork	8.1/10
PopMatters	8/10
Q	4/5 stars
Spin	8/10

L'Enfant Sauvage was met with universal acclaim from music critics. On Metacritic, based on 10 reviews, the album has received a score of 86/100, which indicates "universal acclaim".

Writing for the BBC, Raziq Rauf wrote that "This is as flawless an extreme metal album as you'll hear, in 2012 or any other year", adding that "Gojira is one of the finest bands of our generation, and with L'Enfant Sauvage they've created another album to suit such a reputation." In his review of the album for The Guardian, Dom Lawson gave the album a perfect rating, writing that "Their fifth studio album sustains their trademark blend of unfathomable heaviness, structural invention and ecological-cum-existential poetry while subtly enhancing its dramatic and emotional impact", concluding that "overall this is a ferociously original piece of work that reaches its electrifying zenith on The Gift of Guilt: six minutes of sledgehammer sorrow built from riffs that sound like warning shots fired from the planet's doomed and turbulent core. This is metal taken to a higher plane of brilliance."

=== Accolades ===
Publication	Accolade	Year	Rank
About.com	Best Heavy Metal Albums	2012	18
The A.V. Club	Loud's best metal, punk, and hardcore of 2012	2012	6
Entertainment Weekly	Six best metal albums of the year	2012	6
Loudwire	10 Best Metal Albums of 2012	2012	5
Metal Storm	The Best Alternative Metal Album	2012	1
PopMatters	The Best Metal of 2012	2012	7
Revolver	25 Best Albums of the 2010s	2019	2

== Commercial performance ==
The album sold almost over 11,000 copies in the United States in its first week of release to land at position No. 34 on The Billboard 200 chart. In comparison, the band's previous CD, The Way of All Flesh, opened with 4,200 units back in 2008 to land at No. 138. It also reached No. 17 digitally in France.

It peaked at No. 6 on the Top Hard Rock Albums chart and No. 13 on the Top Rock Albums chart. On 21 August 2025, it was certified gold by the SNEP in their home country of France.

== Track listing ==
All lyrics are written by Joe Duplantier; all music is composed by Mario Duplantier and Joe Duplantier.

No.	Title	Length
1.	"Explosia"	6:39
2.	"L'Enfant sauvage"	4:17
3.	"The Axe"	4:34
4.	"Liquid Fire"	4:17
5.	"The Wild Healer" (instrumental)	1:48
6.	"Planned Obsolescence"	4:39
7.	"Mouth of Kala"	5:51
8.	"The Gift of Guilt"	5:56
9.	"Pain Is a Master"	5:07
10.	"Born in Winter"	3:51
11.	"The Fall"	5:25
Total length:		52:24

Special edition bonus tracks
No.	Title	Length
12.	"This Emptiness"	3:59
13.	"My Last Creation"	4:08
Total length:		60:31

Bonus DVD: Live at Les Eurockéennes 2009
No.	Title	Length
1.	"Oroborus"	5:31
2.	"The Heaviest Matter of the Universe"	4:24
3.	"Backbone"	4:17
4.	"Love"	4:22
5.	"A Sight to Behold"	5:33
6.	"The Art of Dying"	8:17
7.	"Drum Solo"	2:25
8.	"Clone"	5:53
9.	"Flying Whales"	6:10
10.	"Toxic Garbage Island"	5:31
11.	"Vacuity"	6:13
Total length:		58:36

== Personnel ==
Taken from L'Enfant sauvage liner notes.

=== Gojira ===
- Joe Duplantier – vocals, guitars
- Christian Andreu – guitars
- Jean-Michel Labadie – bass guitar
- Mario Duplantier – drums

=== Additional personnel ===
- Josh Wilbur – production, engineering, mixing
- Joe Duplantier – production, artwork
- Paul Suarez – engineering
- UE Nastasi – mastering
- Gabrielle Duplantier – photography
- Edward O'Dowd – design

== Charts ==
Chart (2012)	Peak position
Australian Albums (ARIA)	47
Austrian Albums (Ö3 Austria)	64
Belgian Albums (Ultratop Flanders)	44
Belgian Albums (Ultratop Wallonia)	28
Canadian Albums (Billboard)	34
Finnish Albums (Suomen virallinen lista)	11
French Albums (SNEP)	11
German Albums (Offizielle Top 100)	44
Irish Albums (IRMA)	92
Norwegian Albums (VG-lista)	12
Scottish Albums (OCC)	48
Swedish Albums (Sverigetopplistan)	28
Swiss Albums (Schweizer Hitparade)	23
UK Albums (Official Charts)	53
UK Rock & Metal Albums (Official Charts)	3
US Billboard 200	34
US Top Hard Rock Albums (Billboard)	6
US Top Rock Albums (Billboard)	13

Chart (2019–2025)	Peak position
Hungarian Physical Albums (MAHASZ)	39
Portuguese Albums (AFP)	38

== Certifications ==
Region	Certification	Certified units/sales
France (SNEP)	Gold	50,000^{‡}
^{‡} Sales+streaming figures based on certification alone.
