= The Old Believer =

2014 studio album by the Atlas Moth

Studio album by The Atlas Moth
- Released: June 10, 2014
- Genre: Stoner Metal, post-metal
- Length: 50:15
- Label: Profound Lore

The Atlas Moth chronology
An Ache for the Distance (2011)	The Old Believer (2014)

Professional ratings
Aggregate scores
Source	Rating
Metacritic	77/100
Review scores
Source	Rating
Pitchfork	(6.7/10)

The Old Believer is the third studio album by American band The Atlas Moth. It was released on June 10, 2014 under Profound Lore Records.

== Track list ==
No.	Title	Length
1.	"Jet Black Passenger"	4:29
2.	"Collider"	3:56
3.	"The Sea Beyond"	6:07
4.	"Halcyon Blvd"	4:17
5.	"Sacred Vine"	5:46
6.	"The Old Believer"	4:41
7.	"City of Light"	5:00
8.	"Wynona"	5:13
9.	"Hesperian"	5:50
10.	"Blood Will Tell"	4:56

== Personnel ==
- David Kush - vocals, guitar
- Stavros Giannopoulos - vocals, guitar
- Alex Klein - bass guitar, backing vocals
- Andrew Ragin - guitar, backing vocals, keyboard
- Dan Lasek - drums

=== Additional musicians ===
- Joe Duplantier - vocals ("Blood Will Tell")
- Jean-Michel Labadie, Mario Duplantier, Christian Andreu - backing vocals ("Blood Will Tell")
- Kim Pack, Sarah Pendleton - violin
- Chris Avgerin - vibraphone

=== Technical personnel ===
- Kyle Spence - mixing, mastering
