= Joe Duplantier =

French musician (born 1976)

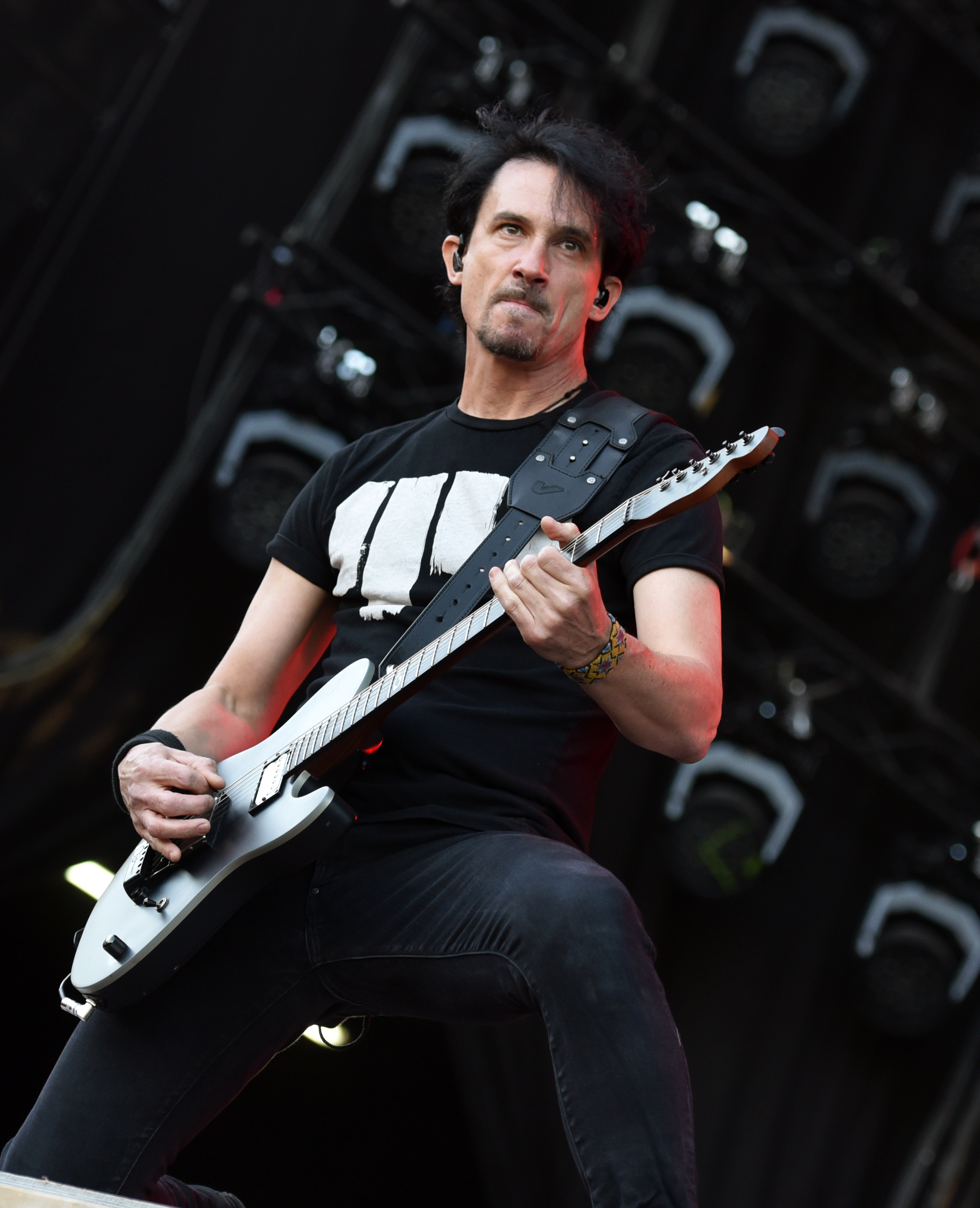
- Duplantier at Rock im Park in 2023

Background information
- Born: Joseph Andrew Duplantier; 19 October 1976 (age 50); Paris, France
- Genres: Death metal; progressive metal; groove metal; post-metal
- Occupations: Musician; songwriter; record producer; activist
- Instruments: Vocals; guitar; bass
- Years active: 1996–present
- Member of: Gojira
- Formerly of: Empalot; Cavalera Conspiracy
- Website: silvercordstudio.com

Joseph Andrew Duplantier (born 19 October 1976) is a French and American musician, best known as the vocalist, guitarist, and lyricist of heavy metal band Gojira. He is also a record producer and environmental activist.

Duplantier was born in Paris and grew up in Ondres. He was raised in an environment where music and the arts held a prominent place. He learned to play the guitar at fourteen and formed his first band in high school. He studied art and began working as a graphic designer before co-founding the death metal band Godzilla with his younger brother Mario in 1996. He was also a founding member, along with his brother, of the band Empalot. Godzilla changed its name to Gojira, which rose from obscurity to international prominence. He is also the former bassist of Cavalera Conspiracy, to which Gloria and Max Cavalera invited him.

Duplantier holds US citizenship by birthright, which led him to settle in New York City in 2011. He owns a recording studio called Silver Cord Studio in Ridgewood, Queens. Throughout his career, he affirmed his concern for nature and animals. He is engaged in thinking about ecological problems and environmental protection, reflected in his lyrics. Duplantier also expressed his support for indigenous peoples in Brazil through fundraising efforts.

== Early life ==
Duplantier was born on 19 October 1976 in Paris. His mother, Patricia (née Rosa; 6 October 1950 – 5 July 2015), was American. She was born in Madison, Wisconsin, and grew up in Los Angeles. His father, Dominique Duplantier, born in 1945 in Bordeaux, is a French painter and architectural drafter, a former student in history at the Faculté des Lettres (Faculty of Letters) and engraving at the Beaux-Arts de Paris. Due to this, Duplantier (and his brother) holds dual French and US citizenship. He is franco-américain (French-American). (Note: Primarily based on the principle of jus sanguinis (right of blood), applied through attribution à la naissance (attribution at birth), because he was born outside the US but obtained its nationality as he fulfilled the condition stipulating that "at least one of his parents is American".)

In 1977, the family left Paris and moved to Ondres, a small seaside town in the Landes department, in an old house with no heating system dating from the Louis XV period. He was raised there, in southwest France, near the Basque country, at 20 km (12 mi) north of Biarritz. His sister, Gabrielle, was born in 1978 in Bayonne, and his brother, Mario, was born in 1981. His mother, manifesting a marked interest in art activities, was a yoga and dance teacher in the periphery of Bayonne. The work of precision and patience of his father, who got up every day at 4:30 am to work, had a significant influence on him. His mother described him as "always active, very creative. Sensitive, gentle", with "some secret force within him, some unusual maturity". (Note: His father, described as "stony-faced", appears in Gojira's "To Sirius" music video, while his mother of youthful appearance dances in a burgundy dress.) As a child, the awakening of his ecological conscience had begun after walking on oil traces on the beach.

When Duplantier was thirteen, he discovered New York City for the first time, accompanied by his cousin during a visit to his family in Pennsylvania, near Harrisburg. Greeted at the airport by his maternal uncle, it was then that he realized how attracted he was to the city. He grew up in an environment where his parents listened to blues, fado, pop, Mozart, Chopin, Piaf, L. Shankar, the Beatles, Michael Jackson, Tina Turner, Billie Holiday, Duke Ellington, Pink Floyd, the Police, Supertramp, and Joan Baez. His sister listened to world music, country music, and African percussion. According to Duplantier's recollection, he began by taking piano lessons but soon realized that he preferred the guitar. He began playing his mother's classical guitar, which only had two strings. He listened to hip hop music during a period of time while his cousin was passionate about Iron Maiden and Metallica. He experienced bullying at school.

Subsequently, a second incident marked him when his brother contracted ear infections after swimming in polluted water. With his brother, he was dismayed by the household and industrial wastes and dead animals stranded in the protected area of the dunes of Ondres. Through the influence of his cousin, he began learning to play Metallica's "Fade to Black" on the guitar when he developed his understanding on this matter. At the age of fourteen, Duplantier began listening to Metallica's Ride the Lightning to find out more about this musical genre which aroused his curiosity. He continued his interests in metal music with Master of Puppets, then Sepultura, and seeking to define his own musical identity he pursued death metal through the band Death.

In high school, at seventeen years of age, he formed his first band, called Eclipse, and embarked on jam sessions with his brother, who had a growing interest and aptitude for drumming. (Note: In 2008, his brother mentioned that Joe was also a member of another band called P4. Mario Duplantier was then twelve years old. P4 was also mentioned in a thread of a French metal website (Vs-webzine), citing the band as "pre-Godzilla" and improvizing in Christian Andreu's garage.) Duplantier went to university for two years and spent between three and four years in art school, after which he began working as a graphic designer for a short time. Dead Man Walking by Tim Robbins has been his favorite movie growing up. When he was a young man, he distinguished himself by picking up trash on a beach and scattering it in the parking lot of the mayor's office, attracting the attention of the local media in France. Duplantier said: "I found it so weird; people aren't bothered by what's on the beach, but when it's on a parking lot, it becomes a problem".

== Career ==
=== Gojira ===
Duplantier and his brother formed their band and established themselves on the live circuit in southwest France. Initially called Godzilla in 1996, the band was later renamed Gojira. He recalled building cabins in the forest as a child. Then, at the age of twenty-four, he decided to return to the forest and built a new one where he would live with his girlfriend for two years without income or electricity. Gojira's 2001 debut studio album, Terra Incognita, was written during this experience.

When launching the band, singing in French was irrelevant to Duplantier; he instead chose to sing in English in efforts to globally project the band's aspirations. Thus, he said he did not sing about the problems of France but international issues and the damage inflicted on the planet. He said, "We consider ourselves above all as human, not French." According to Duplantier, the band's primary goal was to maintain complete autonomy and "total control over the band's music". He has been responsible for the artworks for Gojira's albums, each representing an idea that he spontaneously and minimalistically designs.

Touring in support of their second album, The Link, Duplantier used to let his imagination run free when performing the songs' extended outro, developing a propensity to experience a "vision" while in a "trance"; saying, "I used to imagine whales—big whales—coming into the venue." One of his first achievements was when the band reached headliner status in France and performed at the Paris' Élysée Montmartre, promoting From Mars to Sirius and then initiating their first tours overseas, notably in America. In 2008, Randy Blythe flew from the US to France to record his vocals on "Adoration for None" and was hosted at Duplantier's home in the southwest for a week. In 2012, he also occasionally played drums in live performances when he and his brother switched places.

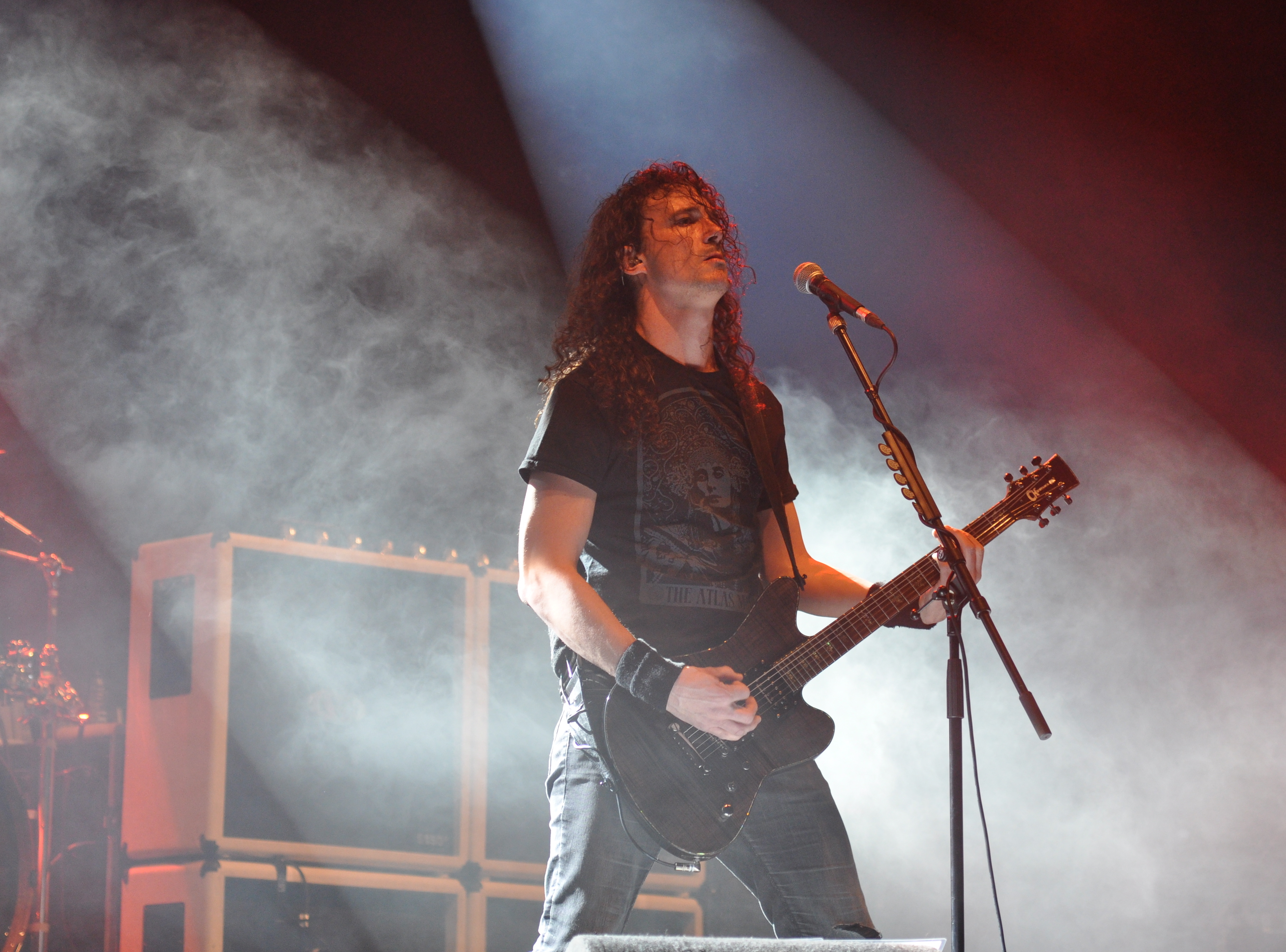
Duplantier performing with Gojira in 2013

A week before the release of Gojira's Magma, he expressed his disillusionment when he said that the metal genre did not receive the attention of the main French-language media. He described the genre as a niche perceived as culturally unimportant in the country, contrasting with Scandinavia and Germany. Benoit Guerin, department director of Ouest-France, echoed his view and wrote, "In France, [modern] chanson is the queen", noting that it took Gojira a significant impact on the metal music scene and decades-long experience "to benefit from media spotlights worthy of their rank in their own country". Throughout 2016 and 2017, the French press would publish after scrutiny that Gojira ended up being one of the largest exporters of music from France, leading the country's metal category. In 2017, Gojira performed two consecutive sold-out concerts at the Paris' Olympia, at a time when the band was at its peak of popularity. Regarding the band's first-ever Grammy nomination at the 59th Annual Grammy Awards, Duplantier said: "We started out playing thrash and pretty intense death metal, tracks over which I've been screaming for 20 years, so I didn't expect any reward."

In 2021, Fortitude increased Gojira's media exposure in France and earned them global chart success through the album revolving around Duplantier's committed and positive lyrics. The band was scheduled for its first headlining arena tour in Europe and the UK in 2022, including the 20,300-capacity Accor Arena in Paris (it was postponed to 2023 due to COVID-19 restrictions).

Duplantier portrayed the band's lifestyle as "marginal", comprising musicians who are more creative than "self-destructive" and more interested in art than partying. He later stated that they were "lucky" to have met because communication is the indicator of their personality matching, and also noted that neither of them has drug addiction problems. Thus, the line-up, including Jean-Michel Labadie and Christian Andreu, has never changed. Duplantier portrays Gojira as "four brothers, united, to live our passion".

Before Gojira embarked on their 12-date arena tour in France, beginning on 27 November 2025 at Reims Arena, Duplantier announced that he had injured his hand a few weeks earlier and subsequently underwent minor surgery. Unable to play guitar, he was replaced by Car Bomb guitarist Greg Kubacki. The tour concluded on 12 December at the Zénith of Strasbourg, with a total of 100,000 tickets sold.

=== Empalot ===
Duplantier, along with his brother and friends, was also a member of a festive, theatrical fusion-genre band called Empalot, with which he toured France from 1999 to 2004. For him, the project was synonymous with fits of laughter and happiness. Joe and Mario Duplantier founded Empalot.

=== Cavalera Conspiracy ===
In 2007, Max and Igor Cavalera initially asked Labadie, bassist of Gojira, to fill in on bass for their band, Cavalera Conspiracy. However, Labadie was busy with prior commitments, including Gojira. Instead, Duplantier became the band's bassist through the influence of Max Cavalera's wife, Gloria. Playing Sepultura's "Territory" with the Cavalera brothers during the first jam session in the presence of all the families left him indelible memories. Moreover, while working with the band on their debut album, he experienced a diametrically different studio process, as the songs composed in the morning were recorded "spontaneously" in the afternoon. The studio session lasted fifteen to twenty days. Duplantier stated that Gojira and the recording of The Way of All Flesh had been his main priority, which led him not to do extensive touring with Cavalera Conspiracy. In 2008, he was replaced by Johny Chow on bass duties for Cavalera Conspiracy. Max Cavalera regretted that Duplantier did not appear on the band's second album, Blunt Force Trauma. Cavalera said, "He is a great musician, with a lot of good ideas."

=== Silver Cord Studio ===
Duplantier is the owner of Silver Cord Studio, a recording studio located in Ridgewood, Queens, New York, which he designed himself. After the experience of Gojira's recording studio in the Landes, called Le Studio des Milans, Duplantier sought to continue producing albums independently and planned to create new premises for the band in the US. A friend brought his attention to the Rockwall Studios complex, which contains 100 spaces for artists. Following the project initiation, he teamed up with a friend and sound engineer from Atlanta. With the DIY ethic, he built the studio with the help of friends and people he hired. Duplantier managed the construction project and was involved daily over a period of six months. The studio's construction began in November 2014 and was completed at the pivotal moment of the recording start of Gojira's Magma.

As the band's US headquarters, Duplantier's Silver Cord Studio was inaugurated in April 2015. The studio's name refers to Gojira's instrumental acoustic song, "The Silver Cord", from The Way of All Flesh; he said that like the song, it "now means something else, something very different". On 6 June 2015, it became available for other bands, artists, and producers.

In 2016, by acknowledging that he appreciated creating musical arrangements while being responsible for the overall production of recorded music, Duplantier saw himself more as a producer than a musician. That year, Gojira has been considered a "bi-national band". Following a vocal collaboration with Car Bomb on "Third Revelation" in 2012, Duplantier decided to undertake his production activities (apart from Gojira) in 2016 for their album, Meta. He mainly produces American bands at Silver Cord Studio.

In September 2018, Nick John, the Gojira, Mastodon, and Slayer manager, died from cancer. Mastodon performed a rendition of Led Zeppelin's Stairway to Heaven at his funeral while Duplantier recorded it on his cell phone. Afterward, Duplantier readjusted the audio taken from his phone and recorded it in his studio with Mastodon for an enhanced version. It was released for Record Store Day on a 10-inch album limited to 1,500 copies with the studio version of the song on the A-side and the live version on the B-side, whose sale proceeds were donated to the Hirshberg Foundation for Pancreatic Cancer Research.

=== Other projects ===
Duplantier has written and recorded hundreds of demo songs since the early 2000s, all in an experimental genre. With his music, he explores different sounds, ventures into clean singing, and continues his "personal development", which thus indirectly influences Gojira's compositions.

== Artistry ==
=== Influences ===
Duplantier's early influences include bands such as Death, Metallica, Morbid Angel, Sepultura, Cannibal Corpse, and Slayer. He said that the ambition of Gojira in their early days was to be "violent and dissonant and weird". Duplantier cites Mike Oldfield and his 1983 album Crises as a significant musical inspiration. As he grew older, Duplantier mentioned other musical styles as influences, such as progressive rock, traditional rock, Americana, and blues. In 2021, he has also discussed how Pink Floyd, Led Zeppelin and Jimi Hendrix are continuing inspirations to him. Other artists who Duplantier has cited as influences include Portishead, Radiohead, and Sade. He has also been surrounded by non-musical influences, such as noise, landscape, and emotion. Duplantier has a wide range of musical tastes. He has an interest in the music of Massive Attack, "old jazz", Dead Can Dance, classical music, traditional music, and Stephan Micus. He has expressed admiration for French singer and songwriter Alain Bashung.

=== Voice ===
Duplantier has been known for his aggressive vocals and own signature style, going from a typical death growl to an emphasis on clean singing in Gojira's latest works. He began using the screaming and guttural vocal styles in an instinctive response to his "rage about the world", the planet's environmental problems, the "cruelty of other kids" at school, and politics; he said, "I had to grab a guitar and start screaming". Duplantier's clean singing had already appeared on Terra Incognita's "Clone", conveying the message of human interference with Mother Nature. He used different techniques on the From Mars to Sirius album, going from a "growling timbre" to "semi-clean" vocals in an intonation echoing post-punk singer Jaz Coleman. He experimented with his voice on The Way of All Flesh, and then he continued the clean vocals with the low note on L'Enfant Sauvage's "Born in Winter". In addition, he brought the vocoder for robotic voice effects in "A Sight to Behold". In 2016, Duplantier said he redefined his vocal style with an even greater emphasis on singing. He has expanded his vocal range by personal choice, citing a "vital" need to sing to develop vocal versatility and style diversity. He would take a new vocal approach to his performances during the recording of Magma. On Fortitude, music writer Chad Bowar regarded his vocal performances as a combination of all of his previous techniques: "harsh and melodic". His throat singing was incorporated with various musical forms punctuating "Amazonia", such as the woodwind instrument and the Jaw harp. For their review of this album, Forbes stated that Duplantier's "vocals and lyrical writing remain at the top of his game, and they further cement him as one of the most unique sounding aggressive vocalists of all time."

=== Lyrical themes ===
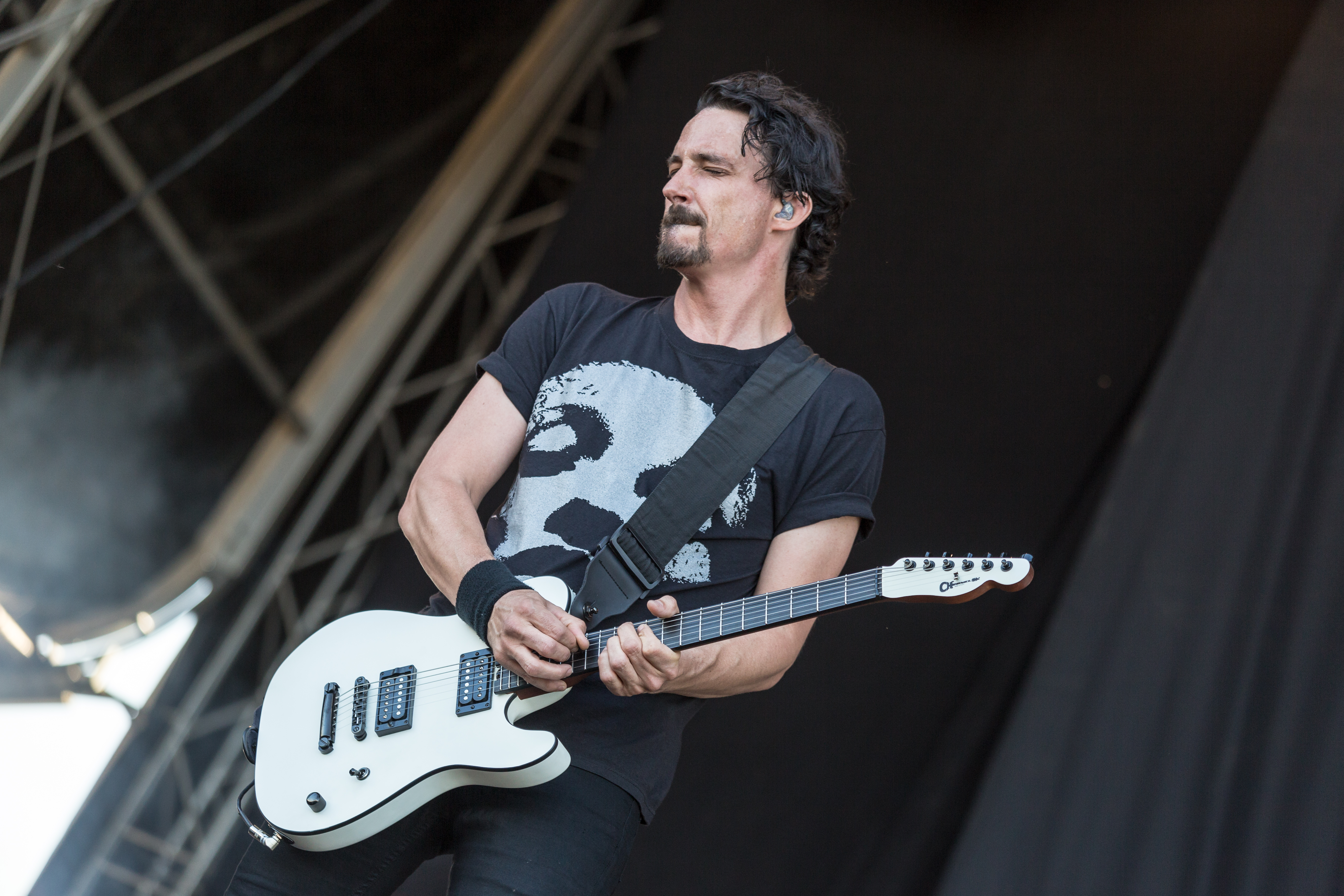
Duplantier's environmental consciousness and philosophical and spiritual interests are reflected in his writing style

In 2016, Duplantier gave a broad interpretation of the lyrical theme of Gojira's songs, saying, "My lyrics speak above all about the liberation of the soul, encourage to see the beauty of things." According to Duplantier, the title of Gojira's second album, The Link, was a symbolic "link" between earth and sky, in allusion to an individual spiritual journey toward self-knowledge. The roots of the tree symbolised the unconscious, while the branches symbolised the divine; thus, the link represented the trunk. Thematically, Gojira's third album recounted the transition from a situation of conflict and war to a situation of serenity that he hoped to see accomplished within humanity, hence the album's title, From Mars to Sirius. Duplantier paid homage to the intelligence of whales on the album and was also inspired by an idea of extraterrestrial life on the "ocean planet" Sirius C. At that time, he said he has been interested in "other worlds" beyond the earth and "different realities". While he theorized that whales would inhabit Sirius C, From Mars to Sirius was also ecologically themed. Some of the lyrical themes of Gojira reflect Duplantier's personal beliefs in preserving the environment.

Adrien Begrand of PopMatters noted that he explored the metaphysical, "elemental", environmental, and spiritual themes on The Way of All Flesh, using words "often poetic" in an approach exhibiting "sincerity and complete lack of pretension". The album L'Enfant Sauvage elaborated on the theme of man's relationship with nature and was juxtaposed with his "difficult" choice he made—collectively with Gojira—to integrate himself "to a certain extent" into society to devote his life to music, rather than living "in a cabin surrounded by nature". The newspaper Voir depicts him as "caught between the concrete and the bark" and writes that he has nevertheless retained his lucidity to focus on art. The philosophical reflection on the relationship of man to nature has been a theme that perpetually fascinated Duplantier.

Duplantier's texts also explore themes such as anguish, death, and loss. He has a philosophical view of death which he, therefore, describes as "the idea of death", and believes in the afterlife, a notion he shared with his mother. Magma's writing and release allow him to understand and accept his own ageing and to apprehend his departure to "another dimension". "Stranded" is a personal song; thus, he did not want to reveal the meaning of the lyrics, nor to whom the song was directed, particularly the line "You kill me face down, dead". However, Duplantier explained problematic communication with a person close to him whom he esteemed. Lyrically "Silvera" focuses on topics including exploitation of farm animals by industrial and animal rights and detail cruelty inflicted on animals shown in the lines, "Dead bodies falling from the sky/We are the ape with the vision of the killing." Speaking on his own behalf and on behalf of Gojira, Duplantier said, nonetheless, that they "do not go on a crusade" and are not imposing their ideas on other bands while on tour. According to him, music has remained the most important; saying, "It is raw and in your face." Reviewing "Amazonia", Alec Chillingworth of Metal Hammer praised its musical style combined with the themes Duplantier drew on his lyrics and described it as Gojira's "starkest, definitive protest song".

== Advocacy and activism ==
Duplantier supports and is part of the environmental corporation Sea Shepherd Conservation Society. The Lyon-based radio station Radio Metal asked him what he would do for a living if he were not in Gojira, or even if he had not made music at all; he responded, "I would be an activist in Greenpeace or Sea Shepherd, an action that defends the planet or the animals. Without any hesitation." He said of himself and Gojira that they spontaneously headed toward Paul Watson and Sea Shepherd and began supporting the organization because, according to him, they became "hard heads" similarly to the band due to the same nomadic lifestyle; adding that they "give everything for their passion, to defend the earth".

He felt "mentally" and "spiritually" engaged in the future of the planet; he said, "I have it in my guts. Why? I never really knew". Duplantier observed that the planet has been overpopulated and thus argued about his lifestyle in accordance with his convictions, saying: "I try to reduce my impact", adding, "but that seems like just a drop in the ocean". He has been interested and worried about the environmental impact of animal husbandry which demands resources such as water, food and contributes to deforestation. Duplantier was a vegetarian but switched to a vegan diet. He has been vegan since 2014. He constantly described himself as an animal-defender speaking in favor of preserving species while evoking humans' responsibility, saying, "The extinction of so many species is going to be one of our legacies". His inner conviction has been represented in Magma's "Silvera" lyrics, shown in the line, "No other blood in me but mine", validating that he does not eat any animals.

Duplantier is a member of the International Artists Solidarity organization. In April 2021, in an interview with Zane Lowe on Apple Music 1, he mentioned his intention to launch the band's own foundation to develop its activist branch.

He has said being sensitive to the deforestation of the Amazon rainforest, and after reflection and speech, he decided to undertake actions to accomplish positive results. During the COVID-19 pandemic, using Zoom call, Duplantier decided to initiate a dialogue with the Indigenous leader Sonia Guajajara of the Articulation of Indigenous People of Brazil, an Indigenously-owned organization fighting for their rights. Guajajara represents more than 300 Indigenous tribes of the Brazilian Amazon. He also spoke with fifteen other Indigenous leaders. In 2021, along with Gojira, he launched Operation Amazonia, an auction to raise funds for the APIB. The charity auction raised more than $300,000 through donations from Metallica, Tool, Devin Townsend, Slash, Slayer, among others.

For several days in late August 2021, Duplantier participated in demonstrations supporting the Indigenous cause at one of Brazil's largest Indigenous rallies. The protests held at Monumental Axis were in opposition to a proposed law initiated in 2007, called "PL490", that would change the status of native people. PL490 would supplant the Fundação Nacional do Índio and the Ministry of Justice, which decide on the demarcation of Indigenous peoples' lands, thus giving "the last word" to the National Congress of Brazil. The bill ("law project" in Europe), being in a favourable environment in 2021, allows the exercise of economic activities on the lands of Indigenous peoples, the modification of their demarcation, and the prohibition of the expansion of existing reserves. The protests also oppose the "federal government's anti-Indigenous policies". An action organized by artists, including Duplantier, was undertaken during the protests in the Three Powers Plaza, in front of the Supreme Federal Court, with the intention of "putting pressure" on it and raising public awareness. The action, led by the Indigenous women of Guarani-Kaiowá, resulted in a performance by Duplantier accompanied by these artists who poured blood on the ground and then mopped it up, shouting repeatedly "Indigenous blood, not a drop more". Duplantier said that it was "A beautiful example of unity and how to turn anger and despair into chanting and dance."

In August 2024, Captain Paul Watson was arrested in Greenland for an arrest warrant issued by Japan. Duplantier posted a video on Instagram, raising awareness about the arrest, asking his audience to join him in a "peaceful protest to demand the release of Paul Watson", in front of the parliament in Copenhagen. Gojira later posted the same video on their official Instagram account.

== Personal life ==
=== Family ===
In 2010, while Gojira was on tour supporting Metallica in Lithuania, Duplantier met his future wife twice in the same day during a "day off"; then Lars Ulrich invited them to drink wine together at the end of the night. In late 2011, Duplantier relocated to New York at the start of the recording of L'Enfant Sauvage. The couple got married, and their daughter was born during the winter months of 2012. His wife, Vilma, is an artist and animal rights activist. He described Ulrich as having become a "kind of godfather" to their children. Though he lived in the outskirts of Bayonne in southwest France, he now resides permanently in Brooklyn, New York, where he lives with his wife, daughter, and son (born 2014). His children have been raised listening to Billie Holiday, the Beatles, Michael Jackson, Stevie Wonder, and metal to develop their musical sensitivity. Duplantier said he had made a long-planned move to the US because of his dual nationality, and to remain closer to his maternal family and Gojira's management, record company, and lawyer. He is a bilingual speaker of French and English.

In mid-April 2015, he (and his brother) flew back to France after an unexpected abrupt deterioration of his mother's state of health. His mother, diagnosed with cancer, asked the family to organise a "great celebration" and a "huge fire" after her death. On 5 July 2015, his mother died in France. His sister, Gabrielle, is a fine-art photographer working alongside her father on the family property in Ondres. During the November 2015 Paris attacks, she was barricaded in a room close to the Bataclan theater's events while working on a photo shoot. Being in New York, Duplantier stated he was unable to reach her on the phone during the mass shooting; he said, "It was horror. There are no words". She survived the attacks on the Bataclan. (Note: Nine jihadists killed 130 people, including 90 at the Bataclan theater, and wounded 350.)

=== Political views ===
In 2008, Duplantier made a pro-US discourse, stating that the influence of the United States has "a lot of weight in the world, in the world's economy", benefiting from being "a very culturally wealthy country", and has succeeded in "facing the future instead of being in the past". In 2017, he revealed that he no longer believed in politics, saying that "people spend too much time thinking about politicians", wondering "what they can do for them." He added: "I believe in revolution, but the revolution must come from each individual, from within." In 2021, he declared himself opposed to Brazilian president Jair Bolsonaro, who accelerated the destruction of the Amazon rainforest and impeded indigenous peoples' rights.

== Equipment ==
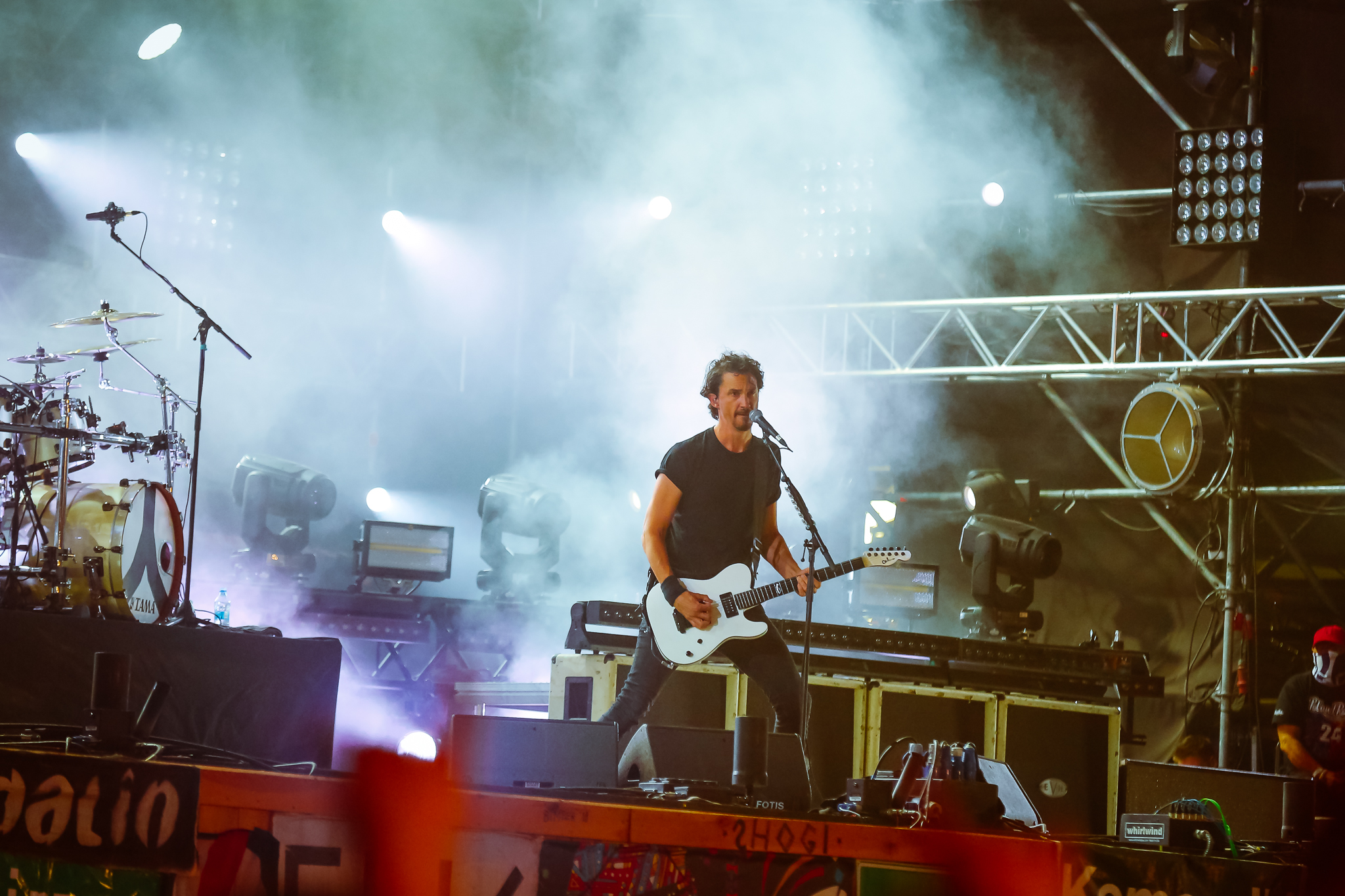
Duplantier playing on his signature Charvel guitar with Gojira in 2018

When playing with Gojira in 2009, Duplantier's equipment was listed as the following:

- Charvel Joe Duplantier Signature San Dimas Style 2
- Charvel Joe Duplantier Signature Pro Mod San Dimas Style 2
- Jackson SLS Guitar
- EVH 5150 III amplifier head
- EVH 5150 III 4x12 Cab
- Boss TU-2 Chromatic Tuner pedal
- Noise Suppressor pedal
- Dunlop .88 millimeter tortex picks
- DiMarzio ClipLock black strap

== Discography ==
=== Gojira ===
Demos

- Victim (as Godzilla) (1996)
- Possessed (as Godzilla) (1997)
- Saturate (as Godzilla) (1999)
- Wisdom Comes (as Godzilla) (2000)

EPs

- Maciste All'Inferno (Gojira) (2003)
- End of Time (Gojira) (2012)

Studio albums

- Terra Incognita (2001)
- The Link (2003)
- From Mars to Sirius (2005)
- The Way of All Flesh (2008)
- L'Enfant Sauvage (2012)
- Magma (2016)
- Fortitude (2021)

=== Empalot ===
- Brout (demo, 1999)
- Tous aux Cèpes (full-length, 2002)
- Empalot en Concert (live, 2004)

=== Cavalera Conspiracy ===
- "Sanctuary" (single, 2008)
- Inflikted (full-length, 2008)

=== As a guest or session musician ===
- Eros & Thanatos by Manimal (on "Dead Meat") (full-length, 2004)
- Through the Absurd by Trepalium (on "Savage") (full-length, 2004)
- Contraires by MyPollux (on "Coffre à Souhaits") (full-length, 2006)
- Demi-Deuil by Aygghon (on "La Terre Dolente") (full-length, 2006)
- All Seeing Eyes by Klone (on "All Seeing Eyes") (full-length, 2008)
- For Death, Glory and the End of the World by Kruger (on "Muscle") (full-length, 2009)
- 7th Symphony by Apocalyptica (on "Bring Them to Light") (full-length, 2010)
- Deconstruction by Devin Townsend Project (on "Sumeria", alongside Paul Masvidal of Cynic) (full-length, 2011)
- w^w^^w^w by Car Bomb (on "Third Revelation") (full-length, 2012)
- The Old Believer by the Atlas Moth (on "Blood Will Tell") (full-length, 2014)
- Damballa's Voodoo Doll by Trepalium (on "Damballa's Voodoo Doll"), alongside Matthieu Metzger of Klone (full-length, 2015)
- Meta by Car Bomb (on "The Oppressor") (full-length, 2016)
- MCID by Highly Suspect (on "SOS") (full-length, 2019)
- Heavy Steps by Comeback Kid (on "Crossed") (full-length, 2022)
- In the Shadow of Your Shadow by Cult of Luna (on "Sadness Will Reign") (full-length, 2026)

=== As a producer ===
- Meta by Car Bomb (full-length, 2016)
- Badder Than Brooklyn by Decatur (full-length, 2017)
- The Legacy of Shi by Rise of the Northstar (full-length, 2018)
- NYNX by McLoud (full-length, 2019)
- "SOS" by Highly Suspect (song, 2019)
- A Feast On Sorrow by Urne (UK) (full-length, 2023)
- "Mother's Tongue" by Bastardane (song, 2026)
