= Duplantier =

Duplantier is a surname. Notable people with the surname include:

- Adrian G. Duplantier (1929–2007), American jurist
- Armand Duplantier (1753–1827), French cavalry officer in the American Revolutionary War
- Joe Duplantier (born 1976), French-American musician
- Jon Duplantier (born 1994), American baseball player
- Mario Duplantier (born 1981), French-American musician, brother of Joe
