= Mario Duplantier =

French drummer

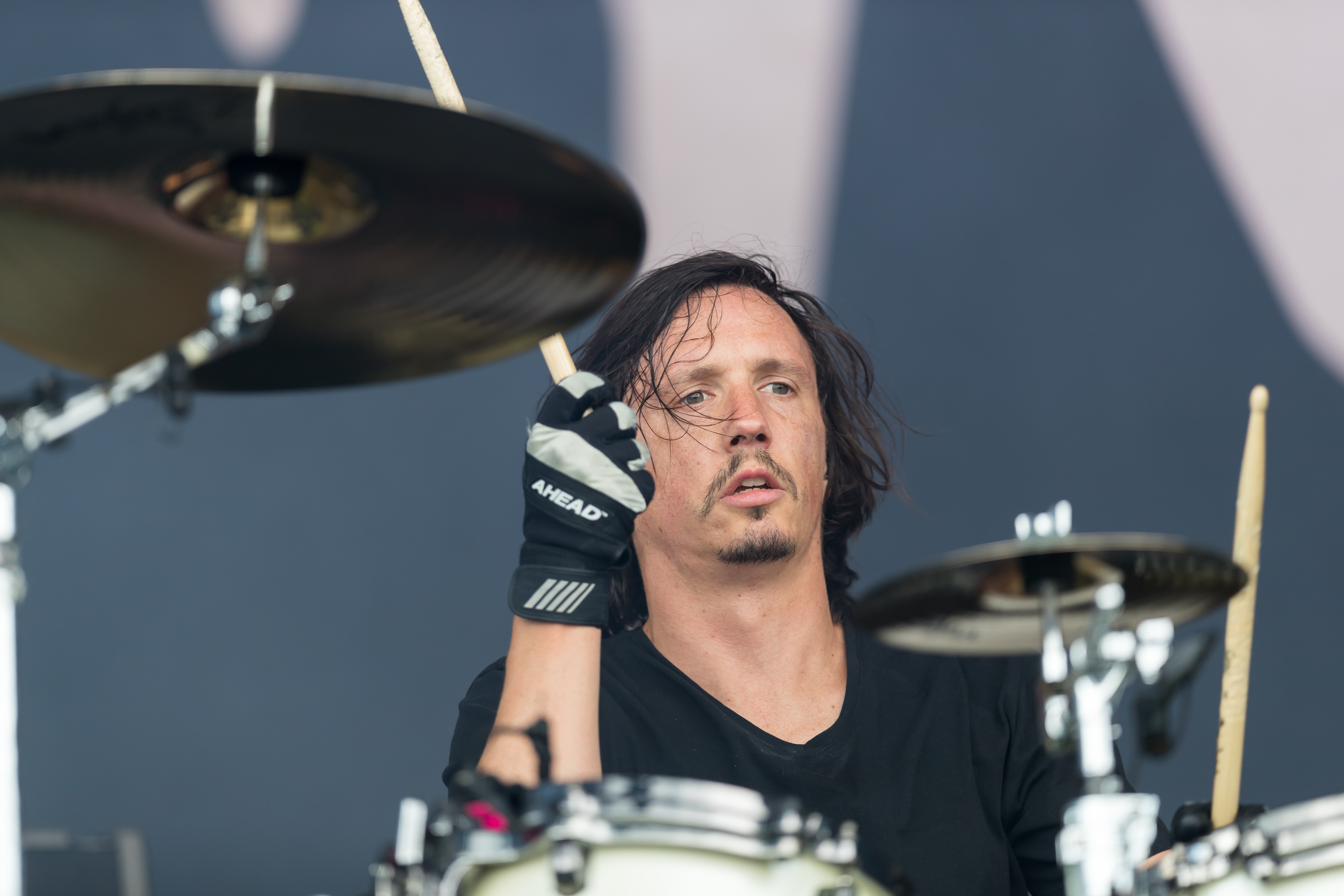
- Duplantier in 2017

Background information
- Also known as: Evil Mario
- Born: Mario François Duplantier; 19 June 1981 (age 45); Bayonne, France
- Genres: Technical death metal; progressive metal; thrash metal; groove metal; avant-garde metal
- Occupation: Drummer
- Years active: 1996–present
- Member of: Gojira
- Formerly of: Empalot
- Website: marioduplantier.com

Mario François Duplantier (born 19 June 1981) is a French musician best known as the drummer for heavy metal band Gojira. He established himself as a powerful, technically precise drummer, using polyrhythmic patterns and distinctive jazzy fills and drum breaks. He has been practising painting and drawing since 2009.

Duplantier developed an early interest in music and started drumming at the age of eleven. In 1996, he co-founded the death metal band Godzilla with his older brother Joe. After a period of self-study, he enrolled at Agostini's drum school and co-founded Empalot in 1998. Godzilla changed its name to Gojira due to legal issues in 2001 and released its debut album, Terra Incognita. His side project, Empalot, was placed on hiatus in 2004 during the rise of Gojira. Duplantier acquired varied experiences through a range of musical styles from extreme metal, jazz, rock, and funk drumming. He exhibited his paintings in France in 2010. He holds dual French and US citizenship.

After constant touring and recording, Duplantier has gained international recognition. He has been described as "one of metal's most creative rhythmic and technical drummers". He has been listed as one of the "world's best metal drummers" by professional music journalists, magazines, and reader polls. He was voted No. 1 four times.

== Early life ==
Mario Duplantier was born in Bayonne, France on 19 June 1981. He grew up in Ondres, southwest coast of France, near the Basque country. He was raised there in a family where arts played a significant role in creativity. His mother, Patricia (née Rosa; 6 October 1950 – 5 July 2015), an American with Azorean roots, was born in Wisconsin and grew up in Los Angeles. His father, Dominique Duplantier, is a French painter and architectural drafter. Patricia, a student in the US, was 23 years old when she met "and fell in love" with Dominique during a trip to Europe in the early 70s. The couple married and settled in Ondres.

Difficult to access, the old family house, which includes his father's adjacent workshop, stands isolated in the Landes forest. His father devoted his life to painting, charged with surrealism. He worked for the mayors of cities in southwest France, drawing landscapes, street plans, and traditional habitats while focusing on architectural details. His father has published books and made art exhibitions in France. Duplantier has a brother, Joe, and a sister, fine-art photographer Gabrielle. His mother described him as an "expansive, funny, lovable, carefree and open child", adding that "he was popular". In his childhood, he spent the most time in his father's workshop and in the one of his sister, who started photography at the age of seventeen. Duplantier suffered from multiple otitis and ear infections at a very young age after swimming in polluted water, which led to surgical procedures; these events had awakened an ecological consciousness in the two brothers. He was free to choose a musical career, but his parents nonetheless encouraged him to obtain his diploma. As a result, he graduated with a French Baccalauréat in literature (L); he later stated, "we had fulfilled the contract, we could do what we wanted".

== Career ==
=== Early career ===
Growing up in an environment where his mother brought rock music, the Beatles, Tina Turner, and Michael Jackson into the house profoundly influenced him. Duplantier recalled that the first song that inspired him was "Another One Bites the Dust" by Queen, and then later, a Metallica cassette tape belonging to his brother made him discover heavy metal. He was first impressed as he watched his brother play the guitar; they understood instinctively that they would join to form a band. He experienced his first introduction to the drums while listening to Metallica, saying, "I took some chopsticks and started to beat everywhere on the table." Patricia, who was highly supportive, bought him his first drum kit. Encouraged by his parents to develop his creativity, he started playing drums at the age of eleven. At the age of twelve, he began his first band with his school friend playing Nirvana, Metallica, and Sepultura covers, and then he discovered more extreme metal.

At thirteen, Duplantier began practicing in earnest the double bass drums and became a death metal drummer in his band named Putride (death–thrash). He was known for his musical maturity. He commented: "In the rehearsal room, I was already a real perfectionist tyrant at thirteen. I wanted everything to be perfect." His brother said, "they were ten times better than my band at the time. The first time he touched the drums, he was very, very good. He was better than the drummer I had at the time".

=== Godzilla (1996−2001) ===
At age fourteen, he wanted to begin a band with his brother Joe, aged nineteen, with the aim of technical and melodic death metal. Both brothers placed an advertisement in a local music store for a guitarist and a bass player and quickly met the Lando-Catalan, Christian Andreu; his friend Alexandre Cornillon joined them soon after. In 1996, the band called themselves Godzilla. Duplantier recalled, "we immediately began to play in an extremely rigorous, almost obsessive way". Duplantier explained the band's approach:

The primary objective was to express our sensibility through an artistic form. It was music, but it could have been painting, drawing or theatre. From the beginning, our music has always acted as a catalyst for the different emotions and energies that run through us. The power and vibration of so-called metal music corresponded perfectly to our inner needs. Its tribal and 'visceral' aspect with its guttural voices was a good way to exorcise our demons, sublimate them into positive energy. In this sense, the myth of Godzilla, a hundred and twenty meters high monster born of nuclear radiation, corresponded to our incomprehension and our anger in the face of a certain human madness.

In 1996, Godzilla released the first demo on cassette tape, Victim. Despite its amateur production "but above average", the demo displayed "an art of syncopated groove"; the band would begin performing on the underground circuit.

In 1997, the band released Possessed, after having moved beyond the experimental stage, while Duplantier began developing his drumming style. At this stage, Duplantier had still not taken drum lessons. Still supported by his mother, he entered Agostini drum school in France and spent seven consecutive years exposed to jazz, Afro-Cuban, and rock drumming; trained to "fineness, less-is-more, dynamics". He would also study music theory there and learn to write drum sheet music.

In 1998, Cornillon left the band to be replaced by the Basque, Jean-Michel Labadie.

Godzilla released two additional demos, Saturate in 1999 and Wisdom Comes in 2000, which marked the end of the "amateur" period. He then undertook a "brutal practice regime".

=== Empalot (1998−2004) ===
Empalot was a side project of the Duplantier brothers involving friends in the line-up and represented the early years of Gojira in France. The band, which included nine musicians on stage, toured between 1999 and 2004 in France. The project was then put on hiatus.

The experience of rock and funk elements in Empalot's music brought him the "groovy aspect" with all the hi-hat openings and the ghost notes, which he had not previously practiced with Godzilla. There was almost no involvement of double bass drums in music.

=== Gojira (2001−present) ===
In 2001, Godzilla renamed itself Gojira. Their debut album, Terra Incognita, was released the same year and already contained their trademark; "ultra-heavy, rhythmically precise crunching".

In 2003, Gojira released the follow-up album, The Link, showing more versatility and an emphasis on melody, with "a quasi-industrial aesthetic and near-atonal brutality".

At that time, Duplantier knew he had "to pass a new level" and created a double-bass drum exercise to increase speed and control. Every day, he practiced a two-hour exercise doing paradiddles on the double kick except on the weekend. He started a second daily exercise consisting of thirty minutes of paradiddles and then one hour of constant double bass. He finished with "straight singles on each foot" for ten minutes.

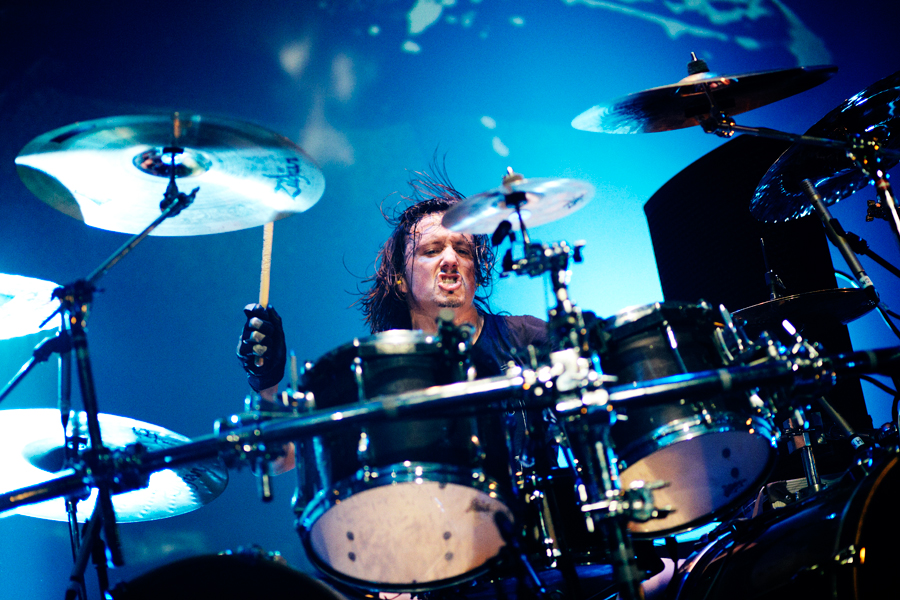
Duplantier performing with Gojira in 2012

In 2005, Gojira released their critically acclaimed breakthrough album, From Mars to Sirius.

In December 2006, he embarked on his first North America tour with Gojira as one of the support bands for Children of Bodom.

Their fourth album, The Way of All Flesh, was released in 2008.

In 2009, the band then began their first North American headlining tour, which presented them as the leading band of the French metal scene.

In 2012, Gojira released their fifth album, L'Enfant Sauvage. Duplantier's approach to the drums was more raw energy focused on this album while maintaining a "live" atmosphere. When recording drums, all of these songs were recorded in one take, with fine adjustments on a few tracks.

In 2016, the band released their commercial breakthrough, Magma. The band had toned down their complexity on Magma. AllMusic's John D. Buchanan stated that "the music is still incredibly heavy". The general tone of the album resulted from a desire "to change the dynamic" and to go "straight to the point", while seeking to add "more colours" in the compositions. In late 2016, he had made seventeen tours around the United States with Gojira.

Duplantier emphasised the groove on Fortitude while keeping some polyrhythm patterns, saying that the songwriting was more about band cohesion than drum performance. The drum recording method was similar to L'Enfant Sauvage. In 2021, his daily routine exercise on the double bass was still practised. He also mentioned a "return of the drums to the forefront" on the eighth album with more technical and experimental drum patterns. Duplantier appeared on NBC's Late Night with Seth Meyers to play drums as part of his residency with the 8G Band throughout the first week of May 2021.

The majority of Gojira's songs were created from Duplantier's drum patterns, such as "Remembrance", "The Art of Dying", "Explosia", "Liquid Fire", "Into the Storm", and the last part of "Grind", among others. Other songs were conceived during spontaneous jams between the four musicians, such as "Sphinx", "Born for One Thing", "New Found", and "Amazonia", among others.

== Style ==
Duplantier is known for his technical and rhythmic heavy precision drumming with extended double-bass blasts, polyrhythmic lines, mid-tempo rock power grooves, precision tom fills, jazzy drum breaks, and blast beats. Loudwire's Graham Hartmann stated that "Mario is one of metal's most creative rhythmic and technical drummers". Batterie Magazine's Sebastien Benoits noted that his drumming style and creativity led him to differentiate himself "from the codes of the extreme genre". Music journalist Spencer Kaufman of Loudwire commented that "his artful drumming provides color and shade to Gojira's signature light and dark sound, running from blast beats to groove and even to incorporating jazz elements into the band's pummeling rhythms." Laurent Bendahan of Batteur Magazine praised his "sense of experimentation, his constant questioning" as well as "his timing" and "explosive strike". Revolver magazine described his drumming style as going "from extreme-metal blasts to jazzy fills to huge stomping beats that rule the mosh pit".

Through the music of Gojira, Duplantier plays drums in different musical styles including technical death metal, thrash metal, progressive metal, groove metal, post-metal, and avant-garde metal.

He warms up more than an hour before each show. Gojira's live shows often feature his drum solos as part of the set. Occasionally, Duplantier plays guitar during live shows when he and his brother, Joe, switch places. He practices the drums in solitude four to five hours a day.

Duplantier names Death's Sean Reinert, Metallica's Lars Ulrich, and Sepultura's Igor Cavalera as musical influences.

== Personal life ==
Duplantier (and his brother) holds dual French and American citizenship. He is franco-américain (French-American) based primarily on the principle of jus sanguinis (right of blood), applied through attribution à la naissance (attribution at birth), because born outside the US but obtained its nationality as he fulfilled the condition stipulating that "at least one of his parents is American". He has two passports, one from each country. He is married to French videographer Anne Deguehegny (responsible for Gojira's live visuals), and they have a daughter together. The family lived in New York City for five years, and their daughter grew up and went to school there.

On 5 July 2015, his mother, Patricia Rosa Duplantier, died from cancer in France.

As part of his drum training, Duplantier runs less than one hour a day or every other day, in addition to abdominal exercises to maintain himself in good physical condition and enhance his cardiovascular endurance. When he lives in the French Basque Country, he practices bodyboarding and surfing one hour per day. Duplantier has been bodyboarding since he was a child. Occasionally, he surfs with Robert Trujillo in California and Biarritz when the latter comes there on vacation.

In February 2022, Duplantier said he lived in Biarritz, in southwestern France.

== Art ==
Duplantier has "developed his drawing, painting and music skills in an environment of freedom and creativity". His mother, a yoga teacher, encouraged him to draw, paint, and do theatre.

His father served as a photographer in the army. Duplantier's interest in photography began in the early days of Gojira as he watched his sister Gabrielle shoot the band's promotional photos "like a savage". In the darkroom, the "mystery of her photos, the beauty of her black and white" and the "mystical aspect" of her work inspired him. When Duplantier was twenty-four years old, he began practicing art photography during a Gojira's North America tour.

In 2009, Duplantier began painting on drumheads when the band ran out of T-shirts to sell and needed the revenue from merchandise during a date in Seattle. That evening he sold ten drumheads that he had painted during the day.

His paintings and drawings were "unconsciously" influenced by the axonometric frescoes of his father, which are regarded as "unprecedented fineness and complexity". He began practicing painting on the road between two concerts in America; he said that it was "a way of staying creative during the many dead times between dates, sound settings, etc". He has been interested in the unconscious as the source of his style of painting, described of an "intriguing darkness"; he said, "these are a bit gloomy paintings... both quirky and mystical, a bit in the spirit of Gojira's music." He is an admirer of Hieronymus Bosch. In June 2010, Duplantier presented a one-night-only art exhibition named Cocktail à Base de Goudron (Tar Based Cocktail), held at L'Atabal in Biarritz, France. In December 2010, he made a second exhibition, titled Cocktail à Base de Goudron edition 2, at the Rock School Barbey in Bordeaux, France.

In 2016, he created custom artwork for the album Epitaphs by the Polish post-metal band Obscure Sphinx.

In 2018, Duplantier also collaborated with Los Angeles-based art team SceneFour. This art publisher created the Art of Drums, a medium of crafting visual art using long-exposure photography capturing drum performances with LED-lit drumsticks—combining color, motion, and lighting. A year of work was necessary to obtain Duplantier's collection named Vers le Cosmos (Towards the Cosmos), including ten canvases in limited edition and signed. Duplantier decided to donate a portion of the proceeds from the sale to The Ocean Cleanup. Through the Art of Drums project, Duplantier joined a group of drummers such as Bill Ward, Cindy Blackman Santana, Chad Smith, Dave Lombardo, and Steven Adler.

== Equipment ==
Duplantier endorses Tama, Zildjian cymbals and Remo.

- Drums – Tama SC Bubinga − White Pearl w/Diamond Inlay
- Drums Tama Superstar Custom- Black Hardware And Yellow Shell
  - 22"x18" Bass Drum
  - 22"x18" Bass Drum
  - 14"x6.5" Snare Drum
  - 12"x9" Tom Tom
  - 13"x10" Tom Tom
  - 16"x16" Floor Tom
- Hardware –
  - Speed Cobra (HP910LSW)
  - DW 5000 Bass Drum Pedals
  - Iron Cobra Lever Glide Hi-Hat Stand (HH905)
  - 1st Chair Ergo-Rider Drum Throne (HT730)
  - Gibraltar Rack And Clamps Hardware
- Cymbals – Zildjian
  - 13" A Custom Hi-Hats
  - 21" Z Custom Mega Bell Ride
  - 18" A Custom Projection Crash
  - 19" A Custom Projection Crash
  - 20" A Custom Projection Crash
  - 10" A Custom Splash
  - 20" A Custom China (x2)
- Other
  - Mario Duplantier Signature Sticks

== Discography ==
=== Gojira ===
Demos

- Victim (as Godzilla) (1996)
- Possessed (as Godzilla) (1997)
- Saturate (as Godzilla) (1999)
- Wisdom Comes (as Godzilla) (2000)

EPs

- Maciste All'Inferno (Gojira) (2003)
- End of Time (Gojira) (2012)

Studio albums

- Terra Incognita (2001)
- The Link (2003)
- From Mars to Sirius (2005)
- The Way of All Flesh (2008)
- L'Enfant Sauvage (2012)
- Magma (2016)
- Fortitude (2021)

=== Empalot ===
- Brout (demo, 1999)
- Tous aux Cèpes (full-length, 2002)
- Empalot en Concert (live, 2004)

== Awards and nominations ==
Award	Year	Recipient(s) and nominee(s)	Category	Result	Ref.
Epiphone Revolver Golden Gods Music Awards	2013	Himself	Best Drummer	Nominated	
Loudwire Music Awards	2012	Himself	Drummer of the Year	Nominated	
Loudwire Music Awards	2017	Himself	Best Drummer	Won	
Loudwire Music Awards	2016	Himself	Best Drummer of the Year	Nominated	
Rhythm/MusicRadar Awards	2016	Himself	Best Metal Drummer	Won	
Rhythm/MusicRadar Awards	2020	Himself	Best Metal Drummer	Nominated	
Rhythm/MusicRadar Awards	2021	Himself	Best Metal Drummer	Won	

- Bernhard Castiglioni of Drummerworld (the "website No. 1 in the world as reference for drummers"), has included Duplantier on his list of 24 names titled "The Metal Drummers" (in alphabetical order).
- 2012: He won the "Best Drummer of Modern Metal" by MetalSucks.
- 2020: Duplantier was awarded the No. 5 ranking on the Revolver's list of the "5 Greatest Metal Drummers of All Time". He was ranked No. 21 on Loudwire's list of "The 66 Best Metal + Hard Rock Drummers of All Time".
