= Fortitude (album) =

Studio album by Gojira
- Released: 30 April 2021
- Recorded: 2018–2020
- Studios: Silver Cord (Queens, New York City)
- Genres: Progressive metal; groove metal; post-metal
- Length: 51:52
- Label: Roadrunner
- Producer: Joe Duplantier

Gojira chronology
| Magma (2016) | Fortitude (2021) |

Singles from Fortitude
- 1. "Another World" Released: 5 August 2020; 2. "Born for One Thing" Released: 17 February 2021; 3. "Amazonia" Released: 26 March 2021; 4. "Into the Storm" Released: 13 April 2021; 5. "The Chant" Released: 26 April 2021

Fortitude is the seventh studio album by French heavy metal band Gojira. The album was released on 30 April 2021 through Roadrunner Records. Recorded at the band's studio in New York City, it was produced by lead vocalist Joe Duplantier, mixed by Andy Wallace and mastered by Ted Jensen.

Gojira's ambition was to write a more cohesive and brighter album than Magma, emphasizing a progressive sound while incorporating guitar solos and classic rock elements with a positive lyrical message. The songwriting began in early 2018 but was put on hold due to the band's touring schedule. The COVID-19 pandemic interrupted the album's mixing, and its release was postponed to a later date.

Fortitude debuted at No. 12 on the Billboard 200 and sold 27,372 units in its debut week in the US, which surpassed Magma's chart performance. The album topped on both the Billboard Hard Rock Albums and Top Rock Albums charts, as well as the UK Rock & Metal Albums chart. The album ranked high on the charts in Europe and sold 9,900 units in France in its first week of release. It peaked at No. 3 on the ARIA Charts. Fortitude was the best-selling album (pure sales) in the United States in its opening week.

Fortitude was met with critical acclaim. Metal Hammer and Revolver named Fortitude the best album of 2021. The album was placed at number three on Rolling Stone's list of "The 10 Best Metal Albums of 2021". At the 64th Annual Grammy Awards, the single "Amazonia" received a nomination for Best Metal Performance. To promote the album, Gojira was scheduled to embark on their first arena-level headlining tour in 2022 in Europe and the UK, but it was postponed due to varying COVID-19 restrictions.

== Background ==
The creative process of Gojira's seventh album began sparingly in late 2017. Gojira intended to write a "groovy, aerated album" with a strong theme and focused on sharing with the audience, an album where two energies coexist, "both very masculine and feminine". The album was inspired as an encouragement to self-reinforcement, "to show courage to face up the world, to face tomorrow's problems". Having had sustained requests to tour worldwide in support of Magma, beyond the initial cycle, Gojira declined in order to focus on writing a new album.

== Recording and production ==
The album's songwriting officially started in early 2018 at New York's Silver Cord Studio, which would become "the cocoon for a two-year creative odyssey". Mario Duplantier mentioned a slower composition process than before due to musical tastes becoming more diversified over the years. The goal was to focus the music on the "big guitar riff" rather than on the performance, with a band cohesion emphasizing this point. The dynamics tended to go towards an organic sound. They used two different guitar amp heads, depending on the songs, and without post-production treatment for a raw result. While retaining their signature style, Gojira extended their range to a "traditional dimension" and started sliding their sound towards the 1970s and 1980s major chords–progressions of "classic bands", embracing melodies and guitar solos. Mario Duplantier "took a back seat to serve the riff" on Fortitude, although he kept the polyrhythmic drumming on some songs. On Fortitude, the band put forward the use of backing vocals and choirs that were already present on the previous albums but "buried" in the mix.

However, the sessions were interrupted by a tour in Europe, and the writing finished after the 2019 Knotfest Roadshow tour throughout the United States and Canada. Joe Duplantier produced the album, and the band recorded it at Silver Cord Studio in late 2019. Mario Duplantier recorded eleven drum tracks in eight days in one or two takes each.

By January 2020, the vocal recordings were finished, and the album was prepared for the mixing stage scheduled to begin on March 10. Andy Wallace came out of retirement to work on Gojira's album. Wallace mixed three songs before the first COVID-19 lockdowns were imposed, while the album was slated for a June 2020 release. Meanwhile, Joe Duplantier, a New York State resident, was visiting his father in southwest France, which complicated the mixing process. Gojira was then unable to rejoin Wallace in Florida due to the sanitary situation. Then Joe Duplantier spent several months in a cabin in the Landes forest without listening to the new tracks and forsook his cell phone and computer. Finally, in July, the band returned to the mixing process over the internet and phone with Wallace. He would prefer to be left alone in the studio, without assistants, being vulnerable to coronavirus infection due to his age, saying he was "infinitely upset not to be with the band". Wallace retained the desire for a raw rendering and the integrity of the spontaneity of Gojira's compositions while bringing "warmth" to the instrumentation. "I really enjoyed this evaluation of the present moment", said Joe Duplantier. The album's release date was then pushed to September due to the COVID-19 pandemic, then failed afterward, and a further postponement was decided upon.

== Composition ==
=== Music ===
Combining the direct approach of The Way of All Flesh mingled with the atmospheric arrangements of Magma, the structure of the songs provided the album an immediacy and more accessibility while offering a return to heaviness. Reviewing the album in Prog magazine, Jerry Ewing wrote that "French metal pioneers Gojira play big prog hand on Fortitude". Fortitude has been described as a combination of progressive metal with a technical approach, groove metal, post-metal, death metal, alternative metal, incorporating progressive rock, stoner rock, Americana, and blues rock elements. "Amazonia" features a "massive bass groove" from Jean-Michel Labadie along with the interactive playing of guitarists Christian Andreu and Joe Duplantier. The latter exhibits a throat singing vocal delivery on the song, incorporating the jaw harp and woodwind instrument. Kerrang!'s Sam Law noted a British influence on "Hold On", while AllMusic's Thom Jurek echoed this view and compared it to Black Sabbath. The elements of neo-psychedelia were still noticeable after Magma's stylistic direction. Joe Duplantier's voice on the song ranges from "layered, near-chanted vocal harmonies" to "layered and clean" to "snarling". Law described "The Chant" as "chain-gang blues, bayou gospel, bar-room Americana", while Spin felt that Gojira took "some risks" with the song, which includes jangly guitar sound and clean vocals. The "heaviness" stood out on the album, according to Metal Hammer; "Grind" contains an abundance of Gojira's trademark pick-scrapes, while "Sphinx" features guttural vocals thus correlated to The Way Of All Flesh. The shifting rhythms showcase Mario Duplantier's trademark drumming style throughout Fortitude amid "death metal grooves" and blast beats, while "Grind" was described as "heavy, syncopated, technical, and nuanced in production, with raging vocals". Spin summed up the album's sound as "generally lighter and more accessible, leaning on elements of prog and classic rock" and noted that it was "a far cry from the searing technical death metal that fueled the band a decade ago". Jonathan Horsley of Guitar World wrote that the album's accent was deliberately on prog and post-metal and also nuanced by electronic elements. Fortitude has been likened to Tool, Led Zeppelin, Sepultura, Killing Joke, and Iron Maiden.

=== Lyrics ===
On Fortitude, Gojira took a different lyrical approach than the one explored on their previous album, Magma. The latter was heavily influenced by the death of Joe and Mario Duplantier's mother and had "a lot of pain and grief attached to it", Joe Duplantier said. This time, the band "had the desire to fill the album with more joy, even if it doesn't come across as joyful music". The album would be emphasized by "more power, and more positivity about life in general." Gojira structured the album thematically around the notion of "urging humanity to imagine a new world − and then make it happen". Reflecting later on his state of mind while writing the lyrics, Joe Duplantier observed: "In an uncertain world, chaotic, I choose optimism by default."

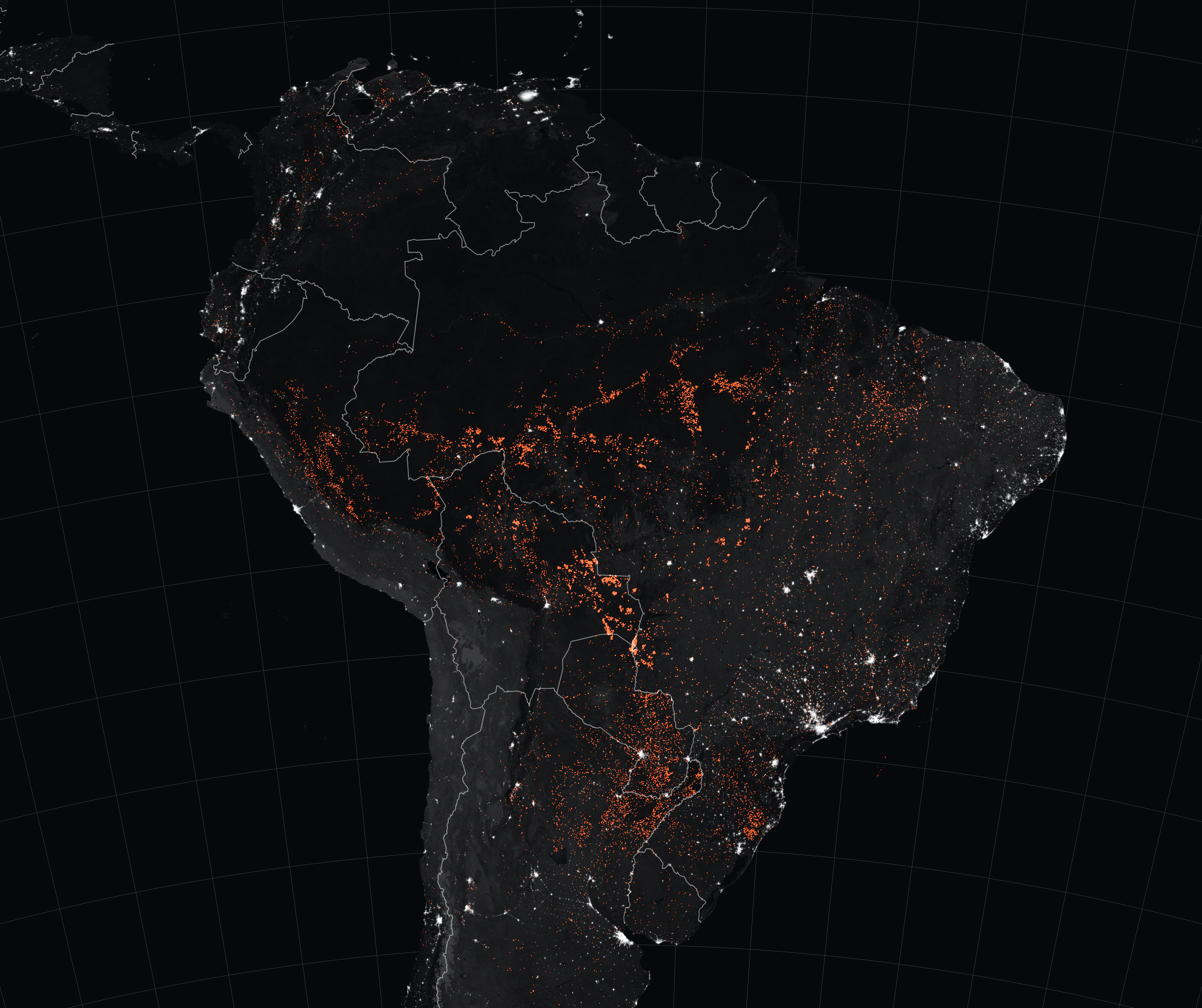
The 2019 Brazil wildfires are the topic of the song "Amazonia".

Joe Duplantier had been immersing himself in Tibetan and Thai philosophy, which were a source of inspiration for the lyrics of "Born for One Thing", conveying an anti-consumerist message. He said that "We have to practice detaching ourselves from everything, beginning with actual things ... Own less possessions, and give what you don't need away". "Amazonia", which talks about the deforestation of the Amazon rainforest (and specifically the 2019 Amazon rainforest wildfires), was released as part of a month-long fundraiser for a Brazilian indigenous rights charity curated by Gojira. The lyrics to "Amazonia" chronicles the reckless deforestation that has accelerated in Brazil under the reign of Jair Bolsonaro, shown in the lines, "The greatest miracle is burning to the ground". "Amazonia" has been described as a protest song and a climate change song. Gojira launched the charity auction on the Propeller platform through a call for solidarity from metal bands such as Metallica, Tool, Slayer, Slash, Sepultura, Deftones, Lamb of God, among others. The fundraiser quadrupled its initial goal of $75,000 and raised over $300,000. A part of the album is a tribute to indigenous communities. The song "Another World" was described as a visionary apocalyptic piece.

== Title and artwork ==
According to Joe Duplantier, the album's title Fortitude "is to inspire people to be the best version of themselves and to be strong no matter what".

The cover art, which represents "the spirit of the album", was designed and painted by Joe Duplantier. His brother Mario brought him various paintings of warriors and knights and showed him Pallas Athena, an 1898 oil-on-canvas painting by Gustav Klimt, and Knights of the Round Table. As he wanted to represent an indigenous person, it ended with his own interpretation of all these elements.

== Release ==
On 5 August 2020, the band released a new single called "Another World", their first single in four years.

On 17 February 2021, Gojira announced Fortitude and its release date for 30 April 2021 via Roadrunner Records. On the same day, the band released an official video for its lead single, "Born for One Thing". Fortitude marked the longest gap between two studio albums in the band's career.

=== Singles ===
The single "Another World" became their first Billboard-charting song, debuting at No. 12 on the Hard Rock Digital Song Sales chart. It peaked at No. 5 in its second week. "Another World" debuted at No. 25 on the Hot Hard Rock Songs chart and peaked at No. 12 in its second week. The single scored 257,000 U.S. streams and sold 1,000 downloads in the tracking week ending 6 August. In its first week of release, "Born for One Thing" peaked at No. 22 on the Hard Rock Digital Song Sales chart. In mid-May 2021, "New Found" peaked at No. 24 on the Hot Hard Rock Songs chart, while "Born for One Thing" and "Amazonia" landed in the top 20.

== Critical reception ==
Professional ratings
Aggregate scores
| Source | Rating |
|---|---|
| Metacritic | 80/100 |
Review scores
| Source | Rating |
| AllMusic | 4/5 stars |
| Blabbermouth.net | 8/10 |
| Clash | 8/10 |
| Decibel | 8/10 |
| Kerrang! | 4/5 stars |
| Metal Hammer | 4.5/5 stars |
| Metal Injection | 9/10 |
| New Noise Magazine | 4/5 stars |
| NME | 3/5 stars |
| Rolling Stone | 4/5 stars |

Fortitude was met with acclaim from music critics. At Metacritic, the album has received a score of 80 out of 100 based on nine reviews, indicating "generally favorable reviews".

Joseph Schafer, writing for Consequence, stated: "Gojira have developed into one of modern metal's premier bands, delivering strong LPs throughout their career, but new album Fortitude makes some bold moves that might help them reach an even wider audience." Schafer deemed the album "could very well be the most solid collection of songs Gojira has committed to tape in 15 years". Forbes termed Fortitude as a demonstration of a "strong sense of urgency felt on the number of social–political issues that Gojira highlight", and praised "these haunting yet poignant lyrical themes." Kerrang!'s Paul Travers wrote that "Gojira never seemed like a band built for the mainstream", but that Fortitude "sounds like the album that could propel them the rest of the way to the top." He noted that the album extends the band's palette and "cements their place as one of metal's most skilled and uncompromising bands." Loudwire described Fortitude as a "dynamic and thought-provoking collection of groove metal beatdowns" while the band "explores a wide range of warm tones throughout the album's mix". Olivier Ducruix of Montreuil's Guitar Part magazine praised "the incredible richness of this record" and wrote that "The riff machine is running at full speed here."

In Tom Morgan's review for Noizze, he gave the album 8 out of 10, as well as remembered previous comparisons of Magma's stylistic departure to Gojira's previous albums as the same as Metallica's 1991 self-titled album and Mastodon's 2011 The Hunter. Different than their respective follow-ups Load and Once More 'Round the Sun, Fortitude "never makes you wish that you were listening to the band's earlier work, and instead simply feels like the natural evolution of this insanely talented band." Saby Reyes-Kulkarni of PopMatters gave the album 7 out of 10. He praised Fortitude's production and mixing qualities "where the drums practically sing throughout the entire duration of the album, even when the rest of the band is blaring at full volume", and that it "certainly sounds magnificent", but wondered whether a "band this unorthodox is best served by flirting with [a] stereotypical approach".

Writing for Prog magazine, Jerry Ewing described Fortitude as "easily the best album they've made to date." He also noted that the band embraced a far proggier approach than previous albums and was also aiming for the mainstream like Mastodon's 2009 Crack the Skye. Founder Holger Stratmann of Germany's Rock Hard magazine rated Fortitude 8.5 out of 10 and wrote that the album was "a demanding album that remains highly contagious with interesting details, partly philosophical texts and a positive energy". Giving the album 8 out of 10, Tim Hoffman of RIFF magazine stated that the band "continues to incorporate its artistry and activism in ways that convey complex thoughts on environmentalism with mind-blowing riffs, shredding and increasingly incredible melodies." Kory Grow of Rolling Stone thought that Gojira "mix heavy music with heavy concepts, and never once do they sound like a drag", and summed up the review by saying, "It's all the rage of death metal mixed with the conscience of punk rock and the musicality of progressive rock, and it's never boring".

== Accolades ==
=== Semester-end lists ===
A "—" denotes the publication's list is in no particular order, and Fortitude did not rank numerically.

| Publication | Country | Accolade | Rank | Ref. |
|---|---|---|---|---|
| Bloody Disgusting | US | 10 Killer Records From the First Half of 2021 | — | |
| Clash | UK | The Best Albums Of 2021 (So Far...) | — | |
| Exclaim! | CA | Exclaim!'s 31 Best Albums of 2021 So Far | 17 | |
| Rolling Stone | US | The Best Albums of 2021 So Far | — | |

=== Year-end lists ===
| Publication | Country | Accolade | Rank | Ref. |
|---|---|---|---|---|
| Brave Words & Bloody Knuckles | CA | BravePicks 2021 Top 30 | 20 | |
| Consequence | US | Top 30 Metal and Hard Rock Albums of 2021 | 4 | |
| The Guardian | UK | The 50 best albums of 2021 | 42 | |
| Guitar Part magazine | FR | Best Francophone Albums | 1 | |
| Guitar World | US | The 20 Best Guitar Albums of 2021 | 12 | |
| Kerrang! | UK | The 50 best albums of 2021 | 8 | |
| Knac.com | US | Krystiee Lee's Top Ten Releases for 2021 | 1 | |
| Knac.com | US | Junkman's Top Ten Releases for 2021 | 2 | |
| Knac.com | US | Andrew Depedro's Top Ten Releases for 2021 | 2 | |
| Louder Than War | UK | Louder Than War Albums Of The Year: 2021 | 52 | |
| Loudwire | US | The 45 Best Rock + Metal Albums of 2021 | 10 | |
| The Mercury News | US | Our pick for the very best album of 2021 is ... | 2 | |
| Metal Hammer | UK | Album of the Year | 1 | |
| Metal Hammer | UK | Top 10 prog metal albums of 2021 | 1 | |
| Metal Hammer | DE | The best Progressive Albums 2021 | 1 | |
| Metal Injection | US | Metal Injection Writer's Top 20 Albums Of 2021 | 2 | |
| Le Monde | FR | The favorite albums of Le Monde in 2021 | 5 | |
| NRC Handelsblad | NL | Peter van der Ploeg's best music of 2021 | 1 | |
| Paste | US | The 50 Best Albums of 2021 | 35 | |
| Paste | US | The 40 Best Rock Albums of 2021 | — | |
| La Presse | CA | Pierre-Marc Durivage's Seven Best Albums of 2021 | — | |
| Prog | UK | Top 20 Albums of 2021 | 8 | |
| Revolver | US | 25 Best Albums of 2021 | 1 | |
| Radio France Internationale | FR | Top 10 Francophone Albums of the Year 2021 | — | |
| Rolling Stone | US | Kory Grow's Best Music of 2021 | 5 | |
| Rolling Stone | US | The 10 Best Metal Albums of 2021 | 3 | |
| United News of India | IN | Metal Albums 2021 ... | 4 | |
| de Volkskrant | NL | These are the 40 best albums of 2021 | 30 | |

=== Other rankings ===
On the annual Metal Injection readers' poll of the year's best in music in 2021 (50,000 voters), Fortitude was named "Album of the Year". It was voted number one in the annual readers' poll of Metal Hammer, "The 50 best metal albums of 2021", and was ranked number twelve on Guitar World's "The 20 best guitar albums of 2021" list. In addition, "Born for One Thing" was voted number four on Guitar World's "The 10 best guitar riffs of 2021" list.

Loudwire included "Amazonia" on their list of the "20 Rock + Metal Songs With Social Messages" spanning the period from 1970 to 2021. The magazine also elected "Born for One Thing" as the 4th best metal song of 2021. Consequence placed "The Chant" at number nine on their "Top 30 Metal & Hard Rock Songs of 2021" list.

=== Awards and nominations ===
List of awards and nominations received by "Amazonia"
| Year | Award | Category | Result | Ref. |
|---|---|---|---|---|
| 2022 | Grammy Awards | Best Metal Performance | Nominated | |

== Chart performance ==
In the United States, Fortitude debuted at No. 12 on the Billboard 200, which surpassed Magma's debut on the chart. The album was also No. 1 on the Billboard Tastemaker Albums chart and peaked at No. 2 on the Billboard Vinyl Albums chart. With Fortitude, Gojira made their first appearance in the top ten charts of nine countries. The album peaked at No. 2 on the SNEP albums chart, which marked Gojira's highest-ranking chart position in the country.

== Commercial performance ==
Fortitude took the top spot on both the Billboard Top Album Sales (pure album sales) and Top Current Albums Sales charts with 27,372 album-equivalent units, out of which 24,104 were pure album sales which made the highest opening-week sales for Gojira. It increased their previous sales number by over 10,000 units. Gojira had the top-selling album in its opening week in the United States. (Note: DJ Khaled's Khaled Khaled took the No. 1 spot on the Billboard 200 with 94,000 album-equivalent units, but 15,000 were pure sales. Gojira sold more traditional copies (24,104), outperforming DJ Khaled's new album. DJ Khaled's album-equivalent units included more streaming equivalent albums than Gojira, which helped him gain the highest chart position.) Fortitude was ranked No. 2 in the best-selling list of the French physical record stores Fnac in its first week of release. The album sold 9,900 album-equivalent units in its first week in France. In mid-May 2021, the album moved up from number two to number one in its second week of album sales at Fnac record stores in France. On 29 May 2025, it was certified gold by the SNEP in their home country of France.

== Touring ==
Due to the COVID-19 pandemic, a planned US tour with Deftones and Poppy was canceled in 2020 and again in 2021. It was then rescheduled from mid-April to the end of May 2022, although Poppy canceled her participation. In July 2021 Gojira announced a fall US headlining tour which began at Louder Than Life on 24 September. The tour included performances at Knotfest on 25 September, Aftershock Festival on 9 October, and Welcome to Rockville on 11 November.

In July, Gojira also announced a 2022 headlining tour across Europe spanning mid-January to mid-March to promote the album. The band achieved arena-level headlining status (UK/Europe), appearing in notable locations such as the Tauron Arena Kraków in Poland, the Motorpoint Arena in Nottingham, the Cardiff International Arena in Cardiff, the Forest National in Belgium, the Alexandra Palace in London, and the Rockhal in Luxembourg. A three-date arena tour in France was confirmed in the announcement: Halle Tony Garnier in Lyon on 8 February, the Arkéa Arena in Bordeaux on 9 February, and the Accor Arena in Paris on 26 February. Clara Lemaire of Rock & Folk magazine called the arena tour in France "a consecration for the band" after performing at the Paris' Olympia in 2017, which was their accomplishment in France at that time. The tour was later postponed to 2023 due to increased restrictions in Europe brought on by the COVID-19 pandemic.

Gojira was the headliner on day three of Hellfest Summer Open Air on 19 June 2022, performing for 60,000 people. (Note: Trivia: Gojira's concert was heard several kilometers from the location, and the inhabitants of Clisson, where the festival is held, said they had "the feeling of being under the planes of Roissy airport".)

The band performed at the Luna Park arena in Buenos Aires on 28 August 2022, Rock in Rio 9 festival in Rio de Janeiro on 2 September 2022, and at the Movistar Arena in Bogotá on 4 September 2022. On 30 August 2022, a riot broke out at the Caupolicán Theatre entrance in Chile when 80 fans attempted to enter the venue during Gojira's show, which had sold out in less than 24 hours. As a result, two security guards were injured, and this required the intervention of the national police officers.

== Track listing ==
All lyrics are written by Joe Duplantier; all music is composed by Mario Duplantier and Joe Duplantier.

Fortitude track listing
| No. | Title | Length |
|---|---|---|
| 1. | "Born for One Thing" | 4:20 |
| 2. | "Amazonia" | 5:00 |
| 3. | "Another World" | 4:24 |
| 4. | "Hold On" | 5:30 |
| 5. | "New Found" | 6:36 |
| 6. | "Fortitude" | 2:07 |
| 7. | "The Chant" | 5:12 |
| 8. | "Sphinx" | 4:00 |
| 9. | "Into the Storm" | 5:02 |
| 10. | "The Trails" | 4:07 |
| 11. | "Grind" | 5:34 |
| Total length: | | 51:52 |

Japanese edition bonus tracks
| No. | Title | Length |
|---|---|---|
| 12. | "Silvera" (live at Red Rocks Amphitheatre 2017) | 3:57 |
| 13. | "Backbone" (live at Red Rocks Amphitheatre 2017) | 6:23 |
| 14. | "Pray" (live at Red Rocks Amphitheatre 2017) | 10:20 |
| Total length: | | 72:32 |

== Personnel ==
Personnel adapted from liner notes.

Gojira

- Joe Duplantier – vocals, guitar
- Christian Andreu – guitar
- Jean-Michel Labadie – bass guitar
- Mario Duplantier – drums

Additional

- Joe Duplantier – production, arrangements, cover art
- Ted Jensen – mastering
- Andy Wallace – mixing
- Johann Meyer – engineering
- Brian Montgomery – additional engineering
- Dan Malsch – additional engineering
- Jorge Tavares – additional engineering
- Jamie Uertz – additional engineering
- Taylor Bingley – additional engineering
- Morgan David – additional engineering
- William "Billy" Knauft – additional engineering
- Adriana Vanella – vocals on "Amazonia"

== Charts ==
=== Weekly charts ===
Weekly chart performance for Fortitude
| Chart (2021) | Peak position |
|---|---|
| Australian Albums (ARIA) | 3 |
| Austrian Albums (Ö3 Austria) | 3 |
| Belgian Albums (Ultratop Flanders) | 5 |
| Belgian Albums (Ultratop Wallonia) | 2 |
| Canadian Albums (Billboard) | 15 |
| Czech Albums (ČNS IFPI) | 34 |
| Danish Albums (Hitlisten) | 3 |
| Dutch Albums (Album Top 100) | 4 |
| Finnish Albums (Suomen virallinen lista) | 2 |
| French Albums (SNEP) | 2 |
| German Albums (Offizielle Top 100) | 8 |
| Greek Albums (IFPI) | 3 |
| Hungarian Albums (MAHASZ) | 11 |
| Irish Albums (Official Charts) | 17 |
| Italian Albums (FIMI) | 47 |
| Japanese Albums (Oricon) | 124 |
| New Zealand Albums (RMNZ) | 18 |
| Norwegian Albums (VG-lista) | 10 |
| Polish Albums (ZPAV) | 7 |
| Portuguese Albums (AFP) | 4 |
| Scottish Albums (Official Charts) | 6 |
| Spanish Albums (Promusicae) | 24 |
| Swedish Albums (Sverigetopplistan) | 13 |
| Swiss Albums (Schweizer Hitparade) | 4 |
| Swiss Albums (GFK Romandy) | 1 |
| UK Albums (Official Charts) | 6 |
| UK Rock & Metal Albums (Official Charts) | 1 |
| US Billboard 200 | 12 |
| US Top Hard Rock Albums (Billboard) | 1 |
| US Top Rock Albums (Billboard) | 1 |

=== Year-end charts ===
Year-end chart performance for Fortitude
| Chart (2021) | Position |
|---|---|
| French Albums (SNEP) | 174 |
| US Top Rock Albums (Billboard) | 97 |

== Certifications ==
| Region | Certification | Certified units/sales |
|---|---|---|
| France (SNEP) | Gold | 50,000^{‡} |
^{‡} Sales+streaming figures based on certification alone.

== See also ==
- List of UK top-ten albums in 2021
- List of UK Rock & Metal Albums Chart number ones of 2021
