= The Way of All Flesh (disambiguation) =

The Way of All Flesh is a 1903 novel by Samuel Butler.

The Way of All Flesh may also refer to:

- The Way of All Flesh (1927 film), a lost film
- The Way of All Flesh (1940 film), a remake of the 1927 film
- The Way of All Flesh, 1997 documentary by Adam Curtis
- "The Way of All Flesh" (Superman: The Animated Series), a 1996 episode of Superman: The Animated Series
- The Way of All Flesh (album), a 2008 album by Gojira
