= Brout =

Brout may refer to:

- Robert Brout (1928–2011), Belgian physicist
- Broût, a former commune in central France
- Brout (album), an album by Empalot
