= The Link (album) =

Studio album by Gojira
- Released: 18 April 2003
- Recorded: 2002
- Studios: Studio Des Milans, France
- Genres: Death metal; progressive metal; groove metal
- Length: 47:00
- Labels: Boycott (2003); Listenable (2005)
- Producer: Gabriel Editions

Gojira chronology
Terra Incognita (2001)	The Link (2003)	Maciste All'Inferno (2003)

Singles from The Link
- 1. "Indians" Released: March 2003

Professional ratings
Review scores
Source	Rating
AllMusic	3.5/5 stars
Rock Sound	8/10 stars

The Link is the second studio album by French heavy metal band Gojira. A remastered edition of the album was released in 2005 by the band's former label, Listenable Records. The track "Indians" was released as a single.

In late September 2012, Listenable Records released the album in vinyl format, a strictly limited edition of 250 copies, available in two colors – black and red.

== Track listing ==
All tracks are written by Gojira.

No.	Title	Length
1.	"The Link"	5:08
2.	"Death of Me"	5:46
3.	"Connected" (instrumental)	1:20
4.	"Remembrance"	4:59
5.	"Torii" (instrumental)	1:49
6.	"Indians"	3:57
7.	"Embrace the World"	4:40
8.	"Inward Movement"	5:51
9.	"Over the Flows"	3:05
10.	"Wisdom Comes"	2:24
11.	"Dawn" (instrumental)	8:01
Total length:		47:00

2005 re-release (Listenable Records – POSH067)
No.	Title	Length
1.	"The Link"	5:00
2.	"Death of Me"	5:47
3.	"Connected" (instrumental)	1:18
4.	"Remembrance"	4:35
5.	"Torii" (instrumental)	1:43
6.	"Indians"	3:58
7.	"Embrace the World"	4:39
8.	"Inward Movement"	5:53
9.	"Over the Flows"	3:05
10.	"Wisdom Comes"	2:25
11.	"Dawn" (instrumental)	8:39
Total length:		47:02

Bonus DVD
No.	Title	Length
1.	"Remembrance" (live)	4:23
2.	"Love" (video clip)	3:22
3.	"Gojira Is..."	1:49
4.	"On the B.O.T.A" (live)	2:24
Total length:		11:58

== Personnel ==
Album personnel adapted from the CD liner notes of the 2005 re-release.

Gojira

- Joe Duplantier – vocals, guitar
- Christian Andreu – guitar
- Jean-Michel Labadie – bass guitar
- Mario Duplantier – drums

Technical personnel

- Gabriel Editions – production
- Laurentx Etxemendi – engineering, mixing, mastering
- Joe Duplantier – mixing, artwork
- Jean-Michel Labadie – mixing
