= Maciste All'Inferno (album) =

Maciste all'inferno

Live album / soundtrack album by Gojira
- Released: 2003/2004
- Recorded: 29 May 2003
- Genre: Avant-garde metal; progressive metal; death metal
- Length: 58:04
- Label: Self-released
- Producer: Gojira

Gojira chronology
The Link (2003)	Maciste all'inferno (2003)	From Mars to Sirius (2005)

Maciste all'inferno is an album by French heavy metal band Gojira. The album was recorded live while a projection of the movie Maciste all'inferno (1925) was running at the Rock School Barbey in Bordeaux on 29 May 2003. The album contains fifteen songs, totaling about 50 minutes in length.

On 30 October 2020, Gojira shared a studio performance of a track called "Inferno", as extracted from the album, in Joe Duplantier's Silver Cord Studio.

== Track listing ==
No.	Title	Length
1.	"Maciste 01"	8:28
2.	"Maciste 02"	2:28
3.	"Maciste 03"	4:20
4.	"Maciste 04"	1:52
5.	"Maciste 05"	2:12
6.	"Maciste 06"	2:30
7.	"Maciste 07"	2:22
8.	"Maciste 08"	5:32
9.	"Maciste 09"	2:09
10.	"Maciste 10"	6:37
11.	"Maciste 11"	4:06
12.	"Maciste 12"	4:38
13.	"Maciste 13"	4:21
14.	"Maciste 14"	2:41
15.	"Maciste 15"	3:48
Total length:		58:04

== Personnel ==
- Joe Duplantier – vocals, guitar
- Christian Andreu – guitar
- Jean-Michel Labadie – bass
- Mario Duplantier – drums
