= Terra Incognita (Gojira album) =

2001 studio album by Gojira

Studio album by Gojira
- Released: 19 March 2001
- Recorded: 2000 at Impuls Studios, Belgium
- Genre: Death metal; progressive metal; groove metal
- Length: 66:25
- Label: Gabriel Editions (original release); Boycott Records (2003 re-release); Mon Slip (2005 re-release); Listenable Records (2009 re-release, 2016 remaster)
- Producer: Gojira; Gabriel Editions

Gojira chronology
Terra Incognita (2001)	The Link (2003)

Professional ratings
Review scores
Source	Rating
AllMusic	3.5/5 stars

Terra Incognita is the debut studio album by French heavy metal band Gojira. It was recorded and mixed by Stephan Kraemer. According to a text on the album inlay, the title (Latin for "unknown land") refers to the area inside of each man, where, according to Hindu legend, Brahma hid the divinity that he had taken from humanity for the punishment of its abuse.

In 2009, Terra Incognita was re-released in a limited edition digipack including three bonus tracks that were recorded live in Antwerp, Belgium, in 2006. The 2009 issues of the album were for a limited time only and was eventually reissued once again seven years later on 10 October 2016. Prior to these two reissues and the following years after the 2009 reissue, copies of the album were getting hard to find and were often selling at higher prices on auction sites and sought after by fans following long periods of time being out of print.

== Writing and composition ==
Terra Incognita was written at the time vocalist Joe Duplantier had deliberately moved away from society to live two years in a cabin that he had built. He lived in this cabin in a forest with his girlfriend without electricity and without income. The reference of this experience is in the music video of "Love".

The song "04" was made by Joe and Mario as a birthday present for their mother on her 50th birthday and was never intended to be released at all. The phone call at the beginning of the song is the brothers' uncle who left a voice-mail greeting his sister.

In 2001, Joe Duplantier described that "This [album] cover sums up the whole album, that is to say a reflection, then an exploration of the soul, which remains an unknown land". The man posing on the album cover is guitarist Christian Andreu.

== Track listing ==
All tracks are written by Gojira, except where noted.

No.	Title	Lyrics	Length
1.	"Clone"		4:57
2.	"Lizard Skin"		4:30
3.	"Satan Is a Lawyer"		4:23
4.	"04"	Alberto Rosa	2:10
5.	"Blow Me Away You (niverse)"	Rosa; Joe Duplantier	5:09
6.	"5988 Trillions de tonnes" (instrumental)		1:18
7.	"Deliverance"		4:54
8.	"Space Time"		5:20
9.	"On the B.O.T.A (Brink Of The Abyss)"		2:47
10.	"Rise"		5:09
11.	"Fire Is Everything"		4:58
12.	"Love"		4:19
13.	"1990 Quatrillions de tonnes"		4:20
14.	"In the Forest"		12:11
Total length:			66:25

Hidden track

The song "In the Forest" contains a hidden instrumental song called "Terra Inc." The main piece of the track ends at 5:30 and the hidden song starts at 9:00, giving the song a period of silence lasting 3:30. The song contains complex layers of ambient guitar sounds with various echo and reverb effects. This song ends promptly at 12:11 and closes the album. On the "Reissue version", the song "In the Forest" ends and starts the instrumental hidden song after only 10 seconds of silence. The band employed a similar tactic with the closing and title track of their 2008 album The Way of All Flesh.

2009 reissue (Listenable Records – POSH 121)
No.	Title	Length
14.	"In the Forest"	8:51
15.	"Clone" (live in Antwerpen, 11 February 2006)	4:46
16.	"Love" (live in Antwerpen, 11 February 2006)	4:15
17.	"Space Time" (live in Antwerpen, 11 February 2006)	5:22
Total length:		77:28

== Personnel ==
Gojira

- Joe Duplantier – vocals, guitar
- Christian Andreu – guitar
- Jean-Michel Labadie – bass guitar
- Mario Duplantier – drums

Additional personnel

- Gojira – production
- Gabriel Editions – production
- Stephan Kraemer – engineering, mixing
- Jean-Pierre Chalbos – mastering (La Source Mastering, Paris)
- Seb Dupius – mastering (La Source Mastering, Paris)
- Phil Allemant – pre-production
- Gabrielle Duplantier – photography
