= Magma (Gojira album) =

Studio album by Gojira
- Released: 17 June 2016
- Recorded: 2015–2016
- Studios: Silver Cord (Queens, New York City)
- Genres: Progressive metal; groove metal; post-metal; experimental metal
- Length: 43:51
- Label: Roadrunner
- Producer: Joe Duplantier

Gojira chronology
Les Enfants Sauvages (2014)	Magma (2016)	Fortitude (2021)

Singles from Magma
- 1. "Stranded" Released: 22 April 2016; 2. "Silvera" Released: 20 May 2016

Magma is the sixth studio album by French heavy metal band Gojira. The album was released on 17 June 2016 through Roadrunner Records. Magma was recorded at the band's studio in New York City, and was produced by Joe Duplantier, mixed by Johann Meyer and mastered by Ted Jensen. The album has been noted as a stylistic departure from the band's previous albums, featuring a more accessible atmospheric sound and more prominent use of clean vocals. Magma was dedicated to the Duplantier brothers' mother, Patricia, who died during the recording of the album in 2015.

The album sold 17,000 copies in its first week of release in the United States, charting at number 24 on the Billboard 200, making Magma the band's highest sales and chart debut until Fortitude. Magma had sold 400,000 copies worldwide in its first eight months. The album was nominated for Best Rock Album, and the single "Silvera" was nominated for Best Metal Performance at the 59th Annual Grammy Awards. On 28 December 2023, it was certified gold by the SNEP in their home country of France.

== Background ==
Joe Duplantier relocated to New York City, and construction began on his own recording studio (Silver Cord Studio) in Queens, in November 2014, and his brother Mario joined him there. By April 2015, the studio was complete, and the band began recording music.

== Recording and production ==
The album's sessions were put on hold when Joe and Mario Duplantier flew back to France due to their mother falling ill. At this stage, the Duplantier brothers decided to associate the album title with the imagery of the magma in the Earth's core, saying that they "were feeling a mix between memories of the past and a fear of the future, with all the emotions burning inside. Magma is this expression of something boiling inside: we cannot touch it, but eventually, it will erupt. It makes perfect sense for how we were feeling at the time." Their mother subsequently died in July 2015. The band spent some time touring before returning to the Silver Cord Studio to continue the album's sessions, consequently taking on a darker tone.

The writing process for Magma differed from previous albums, with Joe Duplantier saying that "We do things a little differently. We dump songs, we dump riffs, which we never did before. [In the past] we would prepare 12 songs, get in the studio and record them just exactly as they are on the demos. We decided to do it differently this time." The musical orientation of the album was intended to be "more mature, less visceral", and they also tried to refine the music; "it was a real challenge to develop simplified things on drums", said Mario Duplantier. Bassist Jean-Michel Labadie noted that they desired more breathing in the compositions. About the album's general direction Joe Duplantier stated: "We want a short album. Something less epic than what we usually do. People's attentions are shorter now. So a lot of the songs are four minutes." He also stated: "We have some Pantera-ish kind of riffs, which is kind of new for us. But [...] we want riffs to be a little punchier sometimes." Two months would be required to record the vocals. The mixing of the album was completed in February 2016.

== Music and lyrics ==
On Magma, Gojira placed less emphasis on the notion of extreme metal than the previous albums. Mario Duplantier said, "It's a need that corresponds to our ages, to our life experiences, to the periods we have lived through", referring to the birth of their children and the death of their mother. The album marked the beginning of a departure from their technical death metal, taking the path of groove, atmosphere, and melodies. Magma has been characterised by music critics as progressive metal, groove metal, post-metal, experimental metal, with uncommon time signatures, and incorporating mathy riffs. Music writer Thom Jurek noted elements of neo-psychedelia and post-punk into the music. Industrial guitar sounds appear periodically throughout the album. "Stranded" and "Silvera" exhibits traits of sludge metal. Music critic Joseph Achoury Klejman felt that the album has "rich sound textures" and considered "Yellow Stone" as "Sabbathian". He further noted often "intrepid" production sections, such as "overmixed" tapping, which might have been questionable but eventually "uplifted the whole", as well as "synthetic" sounding drums contrasting with the guitars "of an organic heaviness". Writer Sam Skopp commented that the band's music leans more towards experimentation near the end of the album. The ambiance of "Low Lands" was described as "Floydian", while Jon Hadusek of Consequence felt that the song was on the verge of post-rock. Writing for Consequence, Adam Kivel describes "Low Lands" as "math-y, magnetic", which, in conjunction with the acoustic "Liberation", contrasts sharply with the experimental metal showcased in the album. John D. Buchanan of AllMusic described "The Cell" as a barrage of "syncopated" and "brutal" drumming. As a whole, the complexity was slightly attenuated on Magma, and Gojira took a more straightforward approach to their music which remained, in the words of Buchanan, "still incredibly heavy". Skopp called the album "A Heavy Metal Acid Trip."

Joe Duplantier's clear and distant vocalizations, especially on "The Shooting Star", have been linked to the post-punk singing style, and thus, the nearest resemblance to his voice tone has been Jaz Coleman. This style of vocal harmonies already appeared on From Mars to Sirius. Buchanan described Duplantier's singing on the album as having a "1990s vibe" and juxtaposed the chorus on "Stranded" to the most "sludgier" grunge bands. He further added that the stylistic aspects of Duplantier's vocals on the title track were "liturgical" and "monastic". Although the signature Duplantier death growl remained, he emphasized more on clean vocals, representing a natural progression. Duplantier said,

The real question for me is why did I start to scream in the first place? ... I've really wanted to sing for the longest time. I feel more at peace in my life now, I have love in my life and I have a family, but I still have this rage about the world, about politics, the environmental problems we face and the way people pollute the Earth, the fact that I suffered so much at school from the cruelty of other kids. All these things I carry inside me and I guess they made me scream into the microphone.

Mario Duplantier stated about the lyrical aspect of the album: "When you read Joe’s lyrics, for me, I cry right away" ... "They're very deep and to the point. No bullshit. We recycle our sadness and depression in the music." The title track described "a journey to the sun" and evoked Joe Duplantier's intuitions about reincarnation. Joe Duplantier sang in his native language in the song "Low Lands": "Par–delà le ciel, par–delà le soleil" ("Beyond the sky, beyond the sun"). The album was dedicated to Patricia Rosa Duplantier, the mother of Joe and Mario.

== Release and promotion ==
On 2 April 2016, Gojira released an official video for the track "Stranded", directed by Vincent Caldoni. On 20 May, the band released a music video for the song "Silvera", described by Rolling Stone as "frenetic" and "shocking". The music video directed by Drew Cox shows the band performing "on NYC rooftop amidst a flurry of bodies falling up". In 2017, another official music video for the track "The Cell", also directed by Drew Cox, was released featuring the band playing in black and white thermal imaging.

On 8 July, Gojira released a music video for the penultimate track of the album, "Low Lands". Described by the band as "an intimate and poetic piece", the music video was directed by photographer Alain Duplantier, uncle of Joe and Mario, and assisted by their sister, Gabrielle, also a photographer. The music video features the Duplantier brothers' childhood home in Ondres in the Landes forest, France, "near a stormy ocean", as well as "gothic visuals and some symbolically personal imagery" for the brothers, which mingled representations of "the absence and the omnipresence of the mother". In the video, Claire Théodoly, cousin of Joe, Mario and Gabrielle Duplantier, played the role of the mother "walking towards her deliverance". The music video was edited by the director of photography and editor Mathieu Laclau. The song was "an open letter" from Joe to his mother. At first, he was afraid that the video would be too personal; he nevertheless mentioned that the song would speak to those who have been "affected by the loss of a loved one". Mario Duplantier said:

Our mother wanted us to make a very big fire after she left, a celebration she called 'Patricia's Liberation'. Two days after her death, we gathered about a hundred people and lit a fire 7 metres (23 ft) high. Our uncle Alain was present and very moved. We recreated this giant fire for the filming.

Magma was first available for online streaming via Gojira's official YouTube channel, and two days later, on 17 June 2016, the physical album was released through Roadrunner Records.

== Touring ==
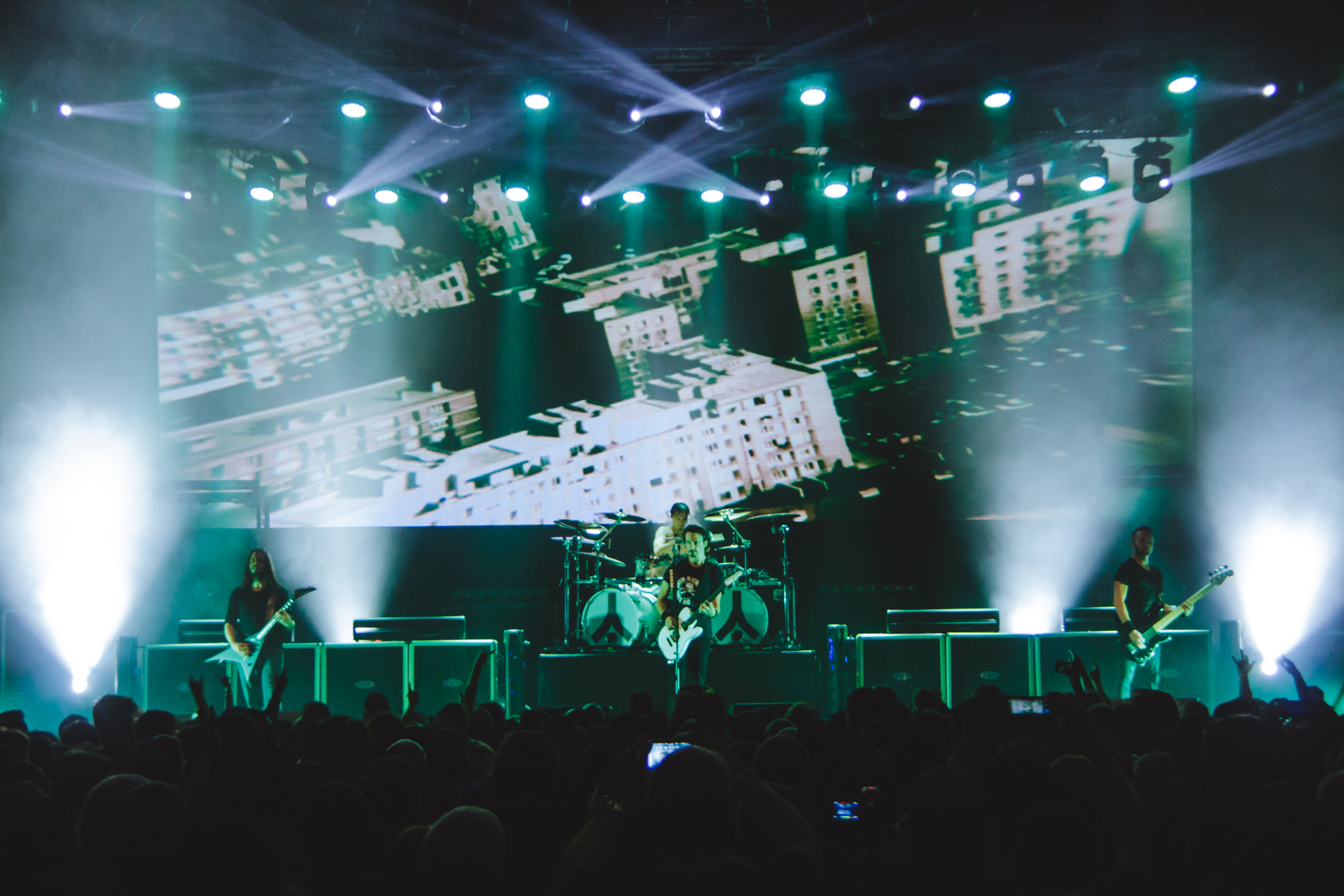
Gojira performing in Toronto, October 2016. According to Gojira, imagery plays an "important role" through concerts which are also real shows, visually speaking.

The Magma World Tour consisted of six weeks of touring then a one-month break before getting back on the road for five to six weeks, repeating the cycle for a total duration of about three and a half years.

On 2 May 2016, Gojira announced a North American tour in support of Magma. The band was supported by the British metal band Tesseract and toured the United States and Canada from July to October 2016. In early June, the band debuted two new songs called "Silvera" and "Stranded" at the Rock in Vienna Festival in Austria. On 14 July, Gojira performed a secret intimate concert for three hundred people at Saint Vitus in New York, which had sold out in ten minutes. Loudwire wrote that "New York City will always be home to Gojira and fans will show up anywhere they play, no matter the size of the venue." They also reported that Joe Duplantier spoke about the terrorist attack in Nice, France, "which for most of us was the first time in the evening that we heard about the calamity." They also noted that it "was bittersweet because it was also the birthday of bassist Jean-Michel Labadie." In July 2016, the band announced that they would support Alter Bridge and Volbeat on a European tour in November and December 2016.

== Critical reception ==
Professional ratings
Aggregate scores
Source	Rating
Metacritic	79/100
Review scores
Source	Rating
AllMusic	4.5/5 stars
Exclaim!	7/10
The Guardian	5/5 stars
Kerrang!	A
Metal Hammer	4.5/5 stars
MetalSucks	4/5 stars
Pitchfork	7.6/10
PopMatters	9/10 stars
Rolling Stone	3.5/5 stars
Spin	8/10

Magma was met with favorable reviews from music critics. At Metacritic, the album has received a score of 79 out of 100 based on 12 reviews, indicating "generally favorable reviews".

In Dom Lawson's review for The Guardian, he gave the album 5/5, writing that "Magma is the kind of album that metalheads would love non-believers to check out, if only because it confounds all the usual stereotypes about the genre being unimaginative and dumb." Adrien Begrand's review for Spin likewise received the album positively, writing that on Magma, Gojira "strip their distinctive sound down even further, most often building songs around one insidiously catchy riff and resisting self-indulgent flights of fancy. It's common for young acts in modern metal to show astonishing technical skill but no sense of restraint. By contrast, there's little else out there like the taut, minimalist Magma right now."

Rolling Stone's Daniel Epstein noted that Magma marks a stylistic departure for Gojira compared to previous albums. "Largely absent are the epic song arrangements and neck-snapping displays of instrumental wizardry that marked their recordings up through 2012's L'Enfant Sauvage. Instead, new tracks like 'The Shooting Star', 'Stranded' and 'Pray' are more about finding a fearsome groove or riff and squeezing it for every last drop of darkness and catharsis." He noted the death of Joe and Mario Duplantier's mother as a likely influence on this development. Epstein also compared the album to Metallica's 1991 self-titled album and Mastodon's 2011 The Hunter, writing that "for those who can appreciate a tightly focused hard rock album infused with emotions that are often just as heavy as its riffs, Magma offers a listening experience that is as rewarding as it is therapeutic."

Writing for Pitchfork, Zoe Camp described Magma as "their most accessible release yet, melodically immediate and charged with emotion." Camp sided with Epstein and other critics in considering the album a stylistic departure from previous releases. Camp wrote that on Magma, Gojira "deliver a taut, catchy crossover effort that inoculates their [heavy] metal with equal parts melodic immediacy and emotional intimacy, while retaining the pillars of their caustic panoply: mathy riffs, uncommon time signatures, ferocious, death-metal-styled vocals, and above all, overpowering anxiety. The new sound's largely a consequence of the Duplantiers' grief; their mother died during the album's gestation, forcing the brothers to get out of their own heads and revisit the material they had so far—often fighting back tears during the sessions."

Joseph Achoury Klejman of Paris' Rock & Folk praised the musical direction and gave the album 4 out of 5; he wrote, "Gojira even breaks its own codes, offering shorter pieces than before, thus gaining in efficiency without losing power". He concluded his review by describing "Liberation" as "an acoustic and instrumental piece where ethnic percussions are invited to finish in style a masterful album". Author Marie-Hélène Soenen felt that the album was "Imbued with a more atmospheric and mystical aura than its predecessors". Music critic Naiko J. Franklin of Paris' Hard Force magazine considered Magma as Gojira's best work thus far and "that of maturity". He found it "Balanced, colourful, sometimes exotic, very often bewitching, dark and melancholic, powerful and refined, overflowing with rage and emotion, absolutely free of any filler or repetition". He concluded by calling the album "a definitively affirmed style, but above all defended with as much ferocity as grace".

== Accolades and legacy ==
Publication	Accolade	Year	Rank
Consequence of Sound	Top 50 Albums of 2016	2016	33
Loudwire	20 Best Metal Albums of 2016	2016	4
Metal Hammer	Album of the Year	2016	1
Metal Injection	Metal Injection Writers' Overall Top 20 Albums of 2016	2016	12
MetalSucks	The 25 Best Metal Albums of 2010–2019	2019	1
Rolling Stone	20 Best Metal Albums of 2016	2016	8
WhatCulture	20 Best Hard Rock & Heavy Metal Albums of 2016	2016	1

Metallica's Kirk Hammett called Magma "an incredible piece of art", saying: "It's heavy, it's vibey, it's moody. It has all the things you want to hear — great complex rhythms, great drumming, great riffs, great songs". Hammett told the Agence France-Presse that Magma was "the best album he had listened to in a long time".

=== Awards and nominations ===
In 2017, Gojira received their first-ever Grammy nominations. At the 59th Annual Grammy Awards, Magma was nominated for Best Rock Album, while its single "Silvera" was nominated for Best Metal Performance.

== Track listing ==
All lyrics are written by Joe Duplantier; all music is composed by Mario Duplantier and Joe Duplantier.

No.	Title	Length
1.	"The Shooting Star"	5:42
2.	"Silvera"	3:32
3.	"The Cell"	3:17
4.	"Stranded"	4:29
5.	"Yellow Stone" (instrumental)	1:19
6.	"Magma"	6:42
7.	"Pray"	5:13
8.	"Only Pain"	3:59
9.	"Low Lands"	6:03
10.	"Liberation" (instrumental)	3:35
Total length:		43:51

== Personnel ==
Personnel adapted from liner notes.

Gojira

- Joe Duplantier – vocals, guitar, flute
- Christian Andreu – guitar
- Jean-Michel Labadie – bass guitar
- Mario Duplantier – drums

Additional

- Joe Duplantier – production, mixing, arrangements
- Ted Jensen – mastering
- Johann Meyer – mixing, engineering
- Alexis Berthelot – additional engineering
- Will Putney – additional engineering
- Jamie Uertz – additional engineering
- Taylor Bingley – additional engineering
- Hibiki Miyazaki – cover art
- The Visual Strategist – design
- Gabrielle Duplantier – band photography

== Charts ==
Chart (2016)	Peak position
Australian Albums (ARIA)	11
Austrian Albums (Ö3 Austria)	9
Belgian Albums (Ultratop Flanders)	15
Belgian Albums (Ultratop Wallonia)	28
Canadian Albums (Billboard)	17
Danish Albums (Hitlisten)	40
Dutch Albums (Album Top 100)	43
Finnish Albums (Suomen virallinen lista)	5
French Albums (SNEP)	10
German Albums (Offizielle Top 100)	14
Greek Albums (IFPI)	25
Hungarian Albums (MAHASZ)	31
Irish Albums (IRMA)	32
Italian Albums (FIMI)	95
New Zealand Albums (RMNZ)	26
Norwegian Albums (VG-lista)	9
Portuguese Albums (AFP)	21
Scottish Albums (Official Charts)	19
Spanish Albums (Promusicae)	64
Swedish Albums (Sverigetopplistan)	26
Swiss Albums (Schweizer Hitparade)	4
UK Albums (Official Charts)	24
UK Rock & Metal Albums (Official Charts)	1
US Billboard 200	24
US Top Hard Rock Albums (Billboard)	1
US Top Rock Albums (Billboard)	4

Weekly chart performance
Chart (2026)	Peak position
Croatian International Albums (HDU)	33

== Certifications ==
Region	Certification	Certified units/sales
France (SNEP)	Gold	50,000^{‡}
^{‡} Sales+streaming figures based on certification alone.
