= Empalot =

French rock band

- Origin: France
- Genres: Experimental metal; jazz fusion; funk rock; alternative metal
- Years active: 1998–2004
- Label: Gabriel Editions
- Spinoff of: Gojira

Empalot were a French experimental rock band formed in the Landes in 1998 by brothers Joe and Mario Duplantier of Gojira. The band members were Laurentx Etxemendi on saxophone, Joe Duplantier on vocals and guitar, Stéphane Chateauneuf on vocals, Christian Maisonnave on percussion and Mario Duplantier on drums. In the band, Joe and Mario called themselves Vensceslas Podoldo and Daniel Pestous, respectively.

== History ==
The group's musical intention was to create a rare type of experimental metal, described as terroir metal (English: style of metal typically linked to the land of a region–sarcasm, irony), which would combine alternative metal, jazz fusion, funk rock, avant-garde, and a touch of insanity accompanied by aggressive vocals of Joe Duplantier. The lyrical themes range from the modern myth of Chouinard to silly songs, criticism of science and a struggle of the medieval period. The offbeat side of the group was also apparent in its appearance: the stage shows were colourful. The members appeared with masks or axes and were disguised as a cloud, a flower, a street lamp, a goat or a fund created by cardboard buildings. The theatrical aspect was reinforced by the fact that the concerts were sometimes mingled with mini-plays.

In a 2004 interview for Noiseweb, Joe Duplantier explained, "Empalot, it's really a story of childhood friends, we met in high school, it's transplanted. In addition, my brother – the drummer of Gojira, the sound engineer of Gojira, the lighting technician of Gojira is [also] the singer of Empalot, so it's a bit the same people and in Empalot, it's humor that expresses itself in music, it's another delirious universe."

In a 2017 interview for the danish magazine Gaffa, Mario Duplantier explained, that his sister had a boyfriend from France who travelled to Denmark and returned with a cassette tape of the danish experimental rock/metal band Düreforsög, which Mario and Joe fell in love with in 1997. Mario Duplantier claims that Düreforsög was their main source of inspiration.

Empalot toured in France between 1999 and 2004. Joe and Mario Duplantier placed the side project on hiatus in 2004.

== Tous aux Cèpes ==
Their only album, Tous aux Cèpes, was recorded in the studio Arema Bordeaux, produced by Gabriel Editions – the same label family created by Gojira. It can be compared to other similar bands like Psykup, Trepalium or Gronibard. There are misspellings on the album; the group wanted it to be that way to magnify the ridicule.

== Band members ==
- Joe Duplantier − lead vocals, guitar, bass (1998–2003)
- Mario Duplantier − drums (1998–2003)
- Stéphane Chateneuf − vocals (1998–2003)
- Laurentx Etxemendi − saxophone (1998–2003)
- Christian Maisonnave − percussion (1998–2003)

== Discography ==
=== Studio albums ===
List of studio albums
Title	Album details
Tous aux Cèpes	Released: 2002; Label: Gabriel Editions; Formats: CD

=== Live albums ===
List of live albums
Title	Album details
Empalot en Concert	Released: 2004; Label: Gabriel Editions; Formats: CD

=== Demo albums ===
List of demo albums
Title	Album details
Brout	Released: 1999; Label: Gabriel Editions; Formats: CD
