= The Atlas Moth =

American post–metal band

- Origin: Chicago, Illinois, United States
- Genres: Post-metal
- Years active: 2007–present
- Labels: Prosthetic, Candlelight, Profound Lore, Init
- Members: Alex Klein (Bass, Backing Vocals); Mike Miczek (Drums, Percussion); Andrew Ragin (Guitars, Synths, Backing Vocals); Stavros Giannopoulos (Guitars, Vocals); David Kush (Guitars, Vocals)
- Past members: Anthony Mainiero (Drums, Percussion); Dan Lasek (Drums, percussion)

The Atlas Moth is an American post-metal band from Chicago, Illinois, that formed in 2007.

== Background ==
The band made its full-length debut on Candlelight in 2009 with A Glorified Piece of Blue-Sky, following up in 2011 with An Ache for the Distance, which was released on Profound Lore. The Atlas Moth blend of musical styles has been described by Pitchfork as "militantly adventurous heavy metal".

== Discography ==
=== Singles ===
- Hope for Atlantis (2008, Witch Trial Records)

=== EPs ===
- Pray for Tides (2008, self-released)
- The One Amongst the Weed Fields (2010, Candlelight Records)

=== Studio albums ===
- A Glorified Piece of Blue-Sky (2009, Candlelight Records)
- An Ache for the Distance (2011, Profound Lore Records)
- The Old Believer (2014, Profound Lore Records)
- Coma Noir (2018, Prosthetic Records)

=== Splits ===
- Label Showcase - Profound Lore Records (2012, Profound Lore Records)
- The Atlas Moth / Wolvhammer (2013, Init Records)
