= Dante Agostini =

French drummer (1921–1980)

- Born: 1 April 1921; Mercatello sul Metauro, Kingdom of Italy
- Died: 21 April 1980 (aged 59)
- Occupations: Musician, Teacher, Author
- Instruments: Drums, percussion

Dante Agostini (1 April 1921 – 21 April 1980) was an Italian-born French drummer and drumming teacher.

== Biography ==
Agostini was born in Mercatello sul Metauro on 1 April 1921. As a child he moved to the French commune of Sin-le-Noble with his family, who left Italy due to the rise of fascism under Benito Mussolini. He began playing drums and accordion at the age of five and performed at a local ballroom in his family orchestra until being conscripted into the compulsory work service during World War II. After the war he began drumming professionally with accordionist Joss Baselli before moving to Montmartre and joining Jacques Hélian's orchestra in 1952. He then entered the Olympia orchestra, where he played alongside Frank Sinatra, Jerry Lewis, and Charles Trenet, and later entered the Folies Bergère orchestra. After shows he played in jazz clubs, where he met visiting American musicians such as Miles Davis, Dizzy Gillespie, and Milt Jackson, whose Hard bop music inspired his teaching methods.

In 1965, he and the American jazz drummer Kenny Clarke founded a school of drumming that bears his name at the headquarters of the instrument maker Henri Selmer Paris, where they developed a method for drum-teaching. The méthode Agostini comprises more than thirty volumes and three CD's. His school now has locations in France, Germany, Italy, Greece, Morocco, and Switzerland. He also developed a notation system to indicate aspects of drumming compositions (e.g. fingerings). He died on 21 April 1980, aged 59.

== Publications ==
- Méthode de Batterie Vol 0
- Méthode de Batterie Vol I
- Méthode de Batterie Vol II
- Méthode de Batterie Vol III
- Méthode de Batterie Vol IV
- Méthode de Batterie Vol V
- Big Band
- Drums
- Solfège Rhythmique Vol 1
- Solfège Rhythmique Vol 2
- Solfège Rhythmique Vol 3
- Solfège Rhythmique Vol 4
- Solfège Rhythmique Vol 5
- Solfège Syncopé Vol 1
- Solfège Syncopé Vol 1 bis
- Solfège Syncopé Vol 2
- Déchiffrages Vol 1
- Déchiffrages Vol 2
- Déchiffrages Vol 3
- Déchiffrages Vol 4
- Déchiffrages Vol 5
- Déchiffrages Vol 6
- Déchiffrages Vol 7
- Déchiffrages Vol 8
- Déchiffrages Vol 9
- Déchiffrages Vol 10
