= The Way of All Flesh (album) =

Studio album by Gojira
- Released: 13 October 2008
- Genres: Technical death metal; progressive metal; groove metal
- Length: 75:07
- Labels: Listenable, Prosthetic
- Producer: Joe Duplantier

Gojira chronology
From Mars to Sirius (2005)	The Way of All Flesh (2008)	The Flesh Alive (2012)

The Way of All Flesh is the fourth studio album by French heavy metal band Gojira. The album was released on 13 October 2008 in Europe via Listenable Records and on 14 October in the US through Prosthetic Records. It sold around 4,200 copies in the United States in its first week of release to debut at number 138 on the Billboard 200 chart. It also reached no. 1 on the Top Heatseekers chart and no. 21 on the Top Independent Albums chart. The album was recorded at the band's home studio while Joe Duplantier produced it. The drums were recorded in Los Angeles and engineered by Logan Mader, who also mixed and mastered the album. The cover features artwork created by vocalist Joe Duplantier, who was responsible for the artwork on past albums.

== Writing and composition ==
Joe Duplantier revealed to Total Guitar magazine that the album deals with their vision about life and death. "The Way Of All Flesh is everything we have to go through until death. I'm 30 years old now and it's the first time as a human being that I've thought about my own death philosophically, and the time that I have to spend here on Earth. It's something that we're all concerned about. But it's almost taboo. You don't go to a party and talk about death, right?”

Duplantier also references the bands that Gojira have toured with as well as the environment and landscape of the band's hometown Bayonne as influences on the writing of this album.

Randy Blythe from the American band Lamb of God appeared as a guest vocalist on the song "Adoration for None."

The song "The Art of Dying" is a reference to the Buddhist concept of rebirth, and features introspective lyrics. At the end of the song "The Art of Dying", there is a small part that is played backwards. If backmasked, the section would bear a resemblance to the song "Esoteric Surgery", which is then repeated at the end of that very next track. A similar technique is used at the end of "Wolf Down the Earth."

== Release and promotion ==
On 6 October 2008, a music video was released for the song "Vacuity", produced by Julien Mokrani and Samuel Bodin. The video was shot near the band's hometown in France, and starred the Duplantiers' cousin, actress Claire Theodoly.

On 11 January 2009, Gojira released a second music video from the album, an animated video for "All the Tears", illustrated by Jossie Malis.

In March 2013, Listenable Records made a double vinyl format of the album available for pre-order, with the official release date listed as 29 April 2013; 250 copies each of blue and white vinyl were manufactured.

== Reception ==
Professional ratings
Aggregate scores
Source	Rating
Metacritic	67/100
Review scores
Source	Rating
About.com	4.5/5 stars
Allmusic	4/5 stars
Alternative Press	3.5/5 stars
Blabbermouth.net	8.5/10
MetalSucks	4.5/5 stars
Pitchfork Media	6.0/10
PopMatters	8/10
Spin	3/5 stars
Sputnikmusic	5/5 stars
Terrorizer	8/10 (Nov 2008)

=== Critical reception ===
The Way of All Flesh was met with generally favorable reviews from music critics. At Metacritic (a review aggregator site which assigns a normalized rating out of 100 from music critics), based on 7 critics, the album has received a score of 67/100, which indicates "generally favorable reviews".

Eduardo Rivadavia of AllMusic wrote that "by the time it finally emerged in late 2008, Gojira's fourth full-length successfully met most all of the understandably heightened expectations head on". Writing for Blabbermouth.net, Keith Bergman described the album was "more opaque than anything — oppressive and suffocating in its world-enveloping tone, massive and clanking in rhythm, giving up its dynamic secrets only after hard, painful slogs through the frozen mire of its glowering groan. But once you've broken through, it's quite a new landscape these madmen have blasted out of the tundra for the rest of us."

Pitchfork's Cosmo Lee wrote a more lukewarm review of the album, praising the strong performances as well as the subject-matter and "humanity" of the album's ecological lyrical themes, but argued that "this humanity doesn't translate to the music. The performances are flawless, but overly so. Everything is polished to a gleaming sheen. [...] Without edges, heat, or blood, though, such punishment is joyless. To their credit, Gojira avoid metal's tonal clichés in favor of open-ended abstraction. But it's cold and distant, unbefitting of the passionate lyrics. Undoubtedly, this material is better live, where the band has a fearsome reputation. There, the images are of raised fists and flying hair. Here, the images are of plastic discs and 1's and 0's."

=== Accolades ===
A "—" denotes the publication's list is in no particular order, and The Way of All Flesh did not rank numerically.

Publication	Accolade	Year	Rank
Decibel	Top 40 Albums	2008	15
LA Weekly	Top 10 Metal Albums	2008	—
Metal Hammer	Top 50 Albums	2008	5
PopMatters	The Best Metal Albums	2008	8
Dallas Observer	Top 10 Metal Albums of 2008	2008	—
NME	100 Greatest Heavy Metal Albums	2009	21

On Kerrang!'s top 50 Best Album Openers In Metal: "a definitive list of the 50 best first tracks in heavy metal history", "Oroborus" was ranked No. 19.

== Track listing ==
Track listing adapted from liner notes.

All lyrics are written by Joe Duplantier, except where noted; all music is composed by Joe Duplantier and Mario Duplantier, except where noted.

No.	Title	Lyrics	Music	Length
1.	"Oroborus"		J. Duplantier, M. Duplantier, Christian Andreu	5:21
2.	"Toxic Garbage Island"			4:06
3.	"A Sight to Behold"			5:09
4.	"Yama's Messengers"			4:03
5.	"The Silver Cord" (instrumental)			2:31
6.	"All the Tears"			3:41
7.	"Adoration for None" (featuring Randy Blythe)	J. Duplantier & Randy Blythe		6:19
8.	"The Art of Dying"			9:54
9.	"Esoteric Surgery"			5:44
10.	"Vacuity"			4:51
11.	"Wolf Down the Earth"			6:25
12.	"The Way of All Flesh"			17:03
Total length:				75:07

Hidden track

The final song and title track of the album, "The Way of All Flesh," contains a hidden instrumental song. The main piece of the track ends at 6:51 and the hidden songs starts in at 12:33, giving the song a period of silence lasting 5:42. The song contains complex layers of ambient guitar sounds with various echo and reverb effects. This song ends promptly at 17:03 and closes the album. A similar tactic was first used by the band in their debut album, Terra Incognita.

The original vinyl version does not contain this track; it ends at 6:51. The 2013 vinyl release contains the hidden track.

== Personnel ==
Gojira

- Joe Duplantier − vocals, guitar, synth on "A Sight To Behold" (uncredited)
- Christian Andreu − guitar
- Jean-Michel Labadie − bass
- Mario Duplantier − drums, synth on "Oroborus" and "Toxic Garbage Island" (uncredited)

Guest musicians

- Randy Blythe − guest vocals on "Adoration for None"

Production

- Joe Duplantier − producer, artwork
- Mario Duplantier − artwork
- Logan Mader − mixing, mastering, drum engineering
- Gabriel Editions − executive producer
- Emma Salzard − production manager
- Undercity Recordings − drum engineering
- Laurentx Etxemendi − guitar/bass/vocal engineering
- Studio des Milans − guitar/bass/vocal engineering
- Mike Rashmawi − drum tracking assistant
- Gabrielle Duplantier − photography/artwork
- Fred Collinet − artwork

== Chart performance ==
Chart (2008)	Peak position
Finnish Albums (Suomen virallinen lista)	25
French Albums (SNEP)	28
UK Albums (OCC)	124
UK Rock & Metal Albums (Official Charts)	7
US Billboard 200	138
US Heatseekers Albums (Billboard)	1
US Independent Albums (Billboard)	21
