= Christian Andreu =

French musician (born 1976)

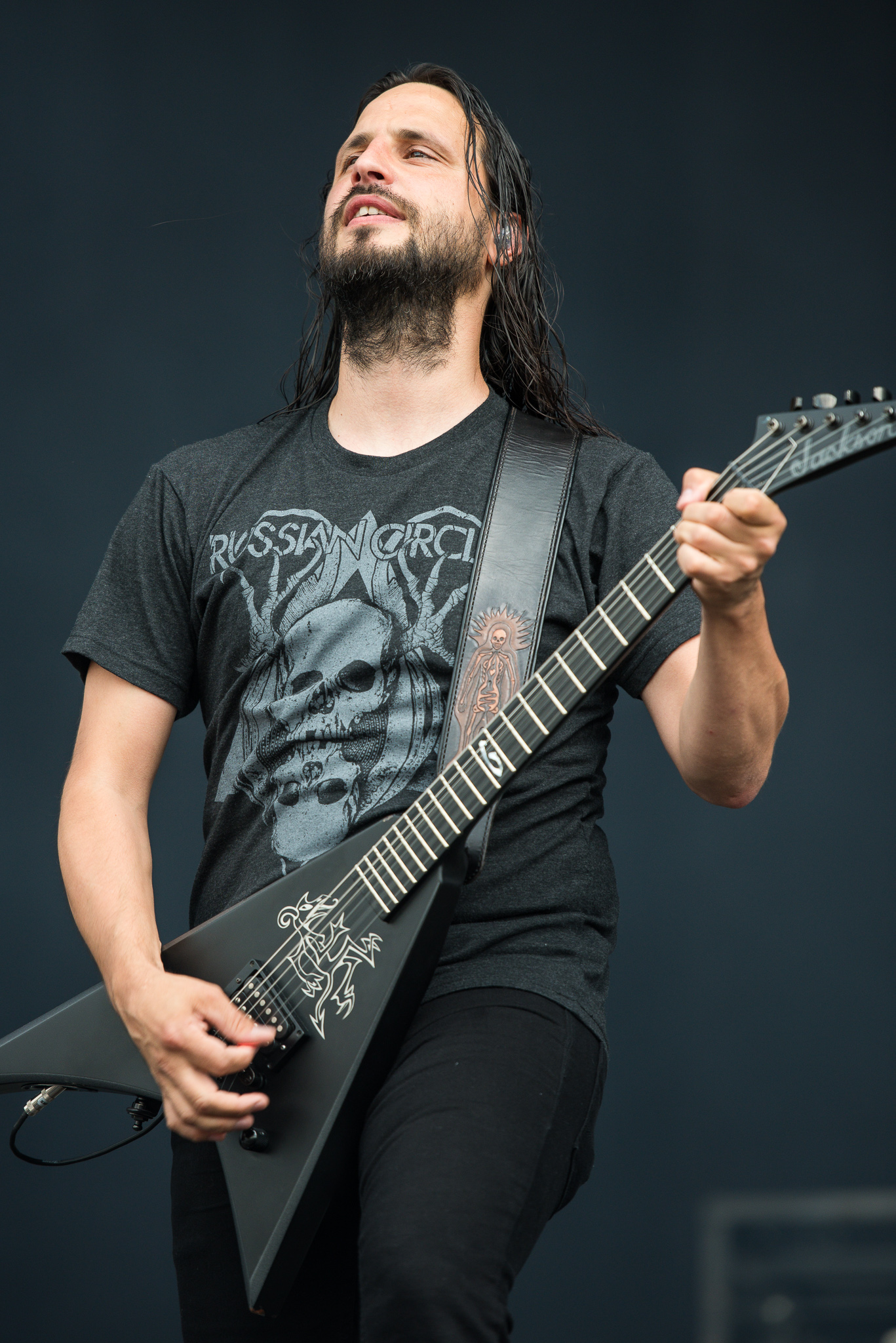
- Andreu at Rock im Park in 2017

Background information
- Born: 15 November 1976 (age 49)
- Genres: Technical death metal; progressive metal; groove metal; thrash metal
- Occupation: Guitarist
- Years active: 1996–present
- Labels: Gabriel Editions; Boycott Records; Next Music; Listenable; Prosthetic; Roadrunner

Christian Roger Andreu (born 15 November 1976) is a French musician best known as the guitarist of heavy metal band Gojira, and was guitarist on a Familha Artús album.

== Music ==
Christian Andreu's influences include bands such as Death, Metallica, Morbid Angel, Tool, Slayer, and classical music.

His favorite non-metal musicians are Mozart, La Tordue, Têtes Raides, and Björk, as well as Bulgarian music and Indian music. He cites French-language singers such as Alain Bashung, Barbara, Jacques Brel, and Georges Brassens.

In an interview for Lyon's ZYVA Magazine, Andreu explained that he does not listen to much metal music apart from Gojira, stating that he primarily listens to classical music. Andreu credited "Symbolic" from the band Death as the song that portrays him.

In 2007, he was also a guitarist in an experimental ethno-tribal progressive rock band playing in a traditional style called Familha Artús.

In May 2019, towards the end of the song "Stranded" at Ohio's Sonic Temple Festival, the pyrotechnic effects of the show projected flames in his face under the effect of the wind. Burned superficially, Andreu had to leave his comrades but returned on stage to complete the concert, while taking breaks between songs to throw water on his face. He recovered quickly.

== Personal life ==
Christian Andreu resides close to nature on the south west coast of France, near San Sebastián, Spain. He maintains his organic garden when he is not on tour, and practices fishing.

== Equipment ==
Guitars

- Jackson RR1t
- Jackson RR Custom (with "G" inlay on 12th fret)
- Jackson RR5
- Gibson Explorer (on The Link Alive)

Amplifiers and Cabinets

- EVH 5150 III 100 watt HEAD (L'Enfant Sauvage – present)
- EVH 5150 III 4×12 Cab (Christian started using EVH in 2009 on Gojira's first headlining tour in US)
- Mesa/Boogie Dual Rectifier (Terra Incognita – The Link)
- Peavey 6505+, 6505, 5150, 5150 II (From Mars to Sirius – The Way of All flesh)

Pedals

- Boss TU-2 Chromatic Tuner
- MXR Smart-Gate
- MXR Carbon Copy Delay

== Discography ==
=== Gojira ===
Demos

- Victim (as Godzilla) (1996)
- Possessed (as Godzilla) (1997)
- Saturate (as Godzilla) (1999)
- Wisdom Comes (as Godzilla) (2000)

EPs

- Maciste All'Inferno (Gojira) (2003)
- End of Time (Gojira) (2012)

Studio albums

- Terra Incognita (2001)
- The Link (2003)
- From Mars to Sirius (2005)
- The Way of All Flesh (2008)
- L'Enfant Sauvage (2012)
- Magma (2016)
- Fortitude (2021)

With Familha Artús

- Òrb (2007)
