= Jean-Michel Labadie =

French musician

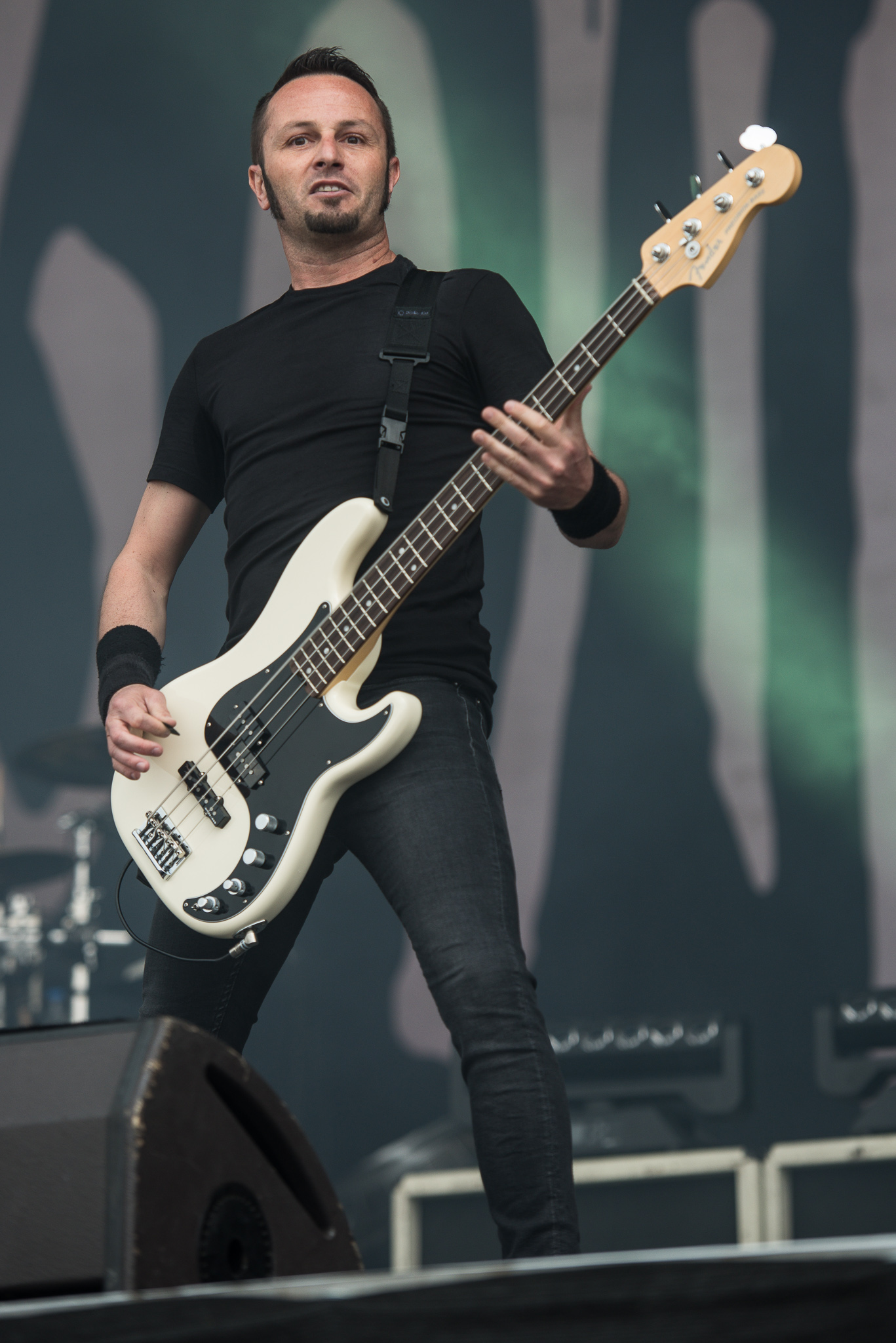
- Jean-Michel Labadie at Rock am Ring, 2017.

Background information
- Born: 14 July 1974 (age 52); Cambo-les-Bains, Pyrénées-Atlantiques, France
- Origin: French
- Genres: Technical death metal; progressive metal; groove metal; thrash metal
- Occupation: Bassist
- Years active: 1998–present
- Labels: Gabriel Editions; Boycott Records; Next Music; Listenable; Prosthetic; Roadrunner

Jean-Michel Labadie (born 14 July 1974 in Cambo-les-Bains, Basque Country) is a French musician best known as the bassist of heavy metal band Gojira.

== Career ==
Labadie grew up in the Basque Country, and played bass in regional underground bands such as Oihuka, a band he had with his brother Vincent and gave him the experience and confidence that would characterize his stage presence in Gojira.

Since 1998, Labadie has been the bassist of the metal band Gojira, which was formed in Ondres (Landes), near Bayonne (Basque Country). The whole band grew up in the south-west of France.

Labadie is known for his energetic live presence during shows, with much jumping around the stage and heavy headbanging. Of the concerts made with Gojira, Labadie said, "I don't feel like a rock star but just human. I'm looking for my place and I want to give the best of myself, and while I can be useful, I just try to do good to people".

== Music ==
When he was eleven years old, Labadie discovered Metallica. He started playing bass at the age of fifteen; "Fade to Black" was the first song he learned to play. He was also influenced by death metal bands such as Death, Morbid Angel, and Sepultura. He also cited Rage Against the Machine, Slayer and Pantera as influences.

== Personal life ==
Labadie likes landscapes, solitude, nature and adrenaline. He started practicing boardsports such as skateboarding, surfing and snowboarding. In 1996, he became passionate about mountain biking, and found these sensations again, "but more brutal". When he's not touring across the world with Gojira, he practices mountain biking at a high level in his Savoyard mountains, the place where he resides. Labadie said, "Playing sports helps keep up the pace. For the drummer, too, you have to train. I like to push my body and the adrenaline it gives me".

== Equipment ==
Labadie is known to use a pick to play bass in Gojira. He uses Darkglass electronics when playing live with the band.

Effects

- KHDK Abyss
- Ibanez TS7
- Boss TU3
- MXR Smartgate
- Radial Headbone VT

Bass guitars

- Tobias Basic 6 Bass
- Fender American Deluxe Precision Bass
- Fender American Deluxe Jazz Bass
- Fender American Deluxe Dimension Bass
- Dingwall Super P Bass
- Sandberg California II TM4 H/J Bass

Amplifiers and Cabinets

- SWR Amps
- Fender SuperBassman 300 Amp
- Darkglass Amps
- Gallien Krueger Amps

== Discography ==
=== Gojira ===
Demos

- Saturate (as Godzilla) (1999)
- Wisdom Comes (as Godzilla) (2000)

EPs

- Maciste All'Inferno (Gojira) (2003)
- End of Time (Gojira) (2012)

Studio albums

- Terra Incognita (2001)
- The Link (2003)
- From Mars to Sirius (2005)
- The Way of All Flesh (2008)
- L'Enfant Sauvage (2012)
- Magma (2016)
- Fortitude (2021)
