= Pierre Singaravélou =

French historian

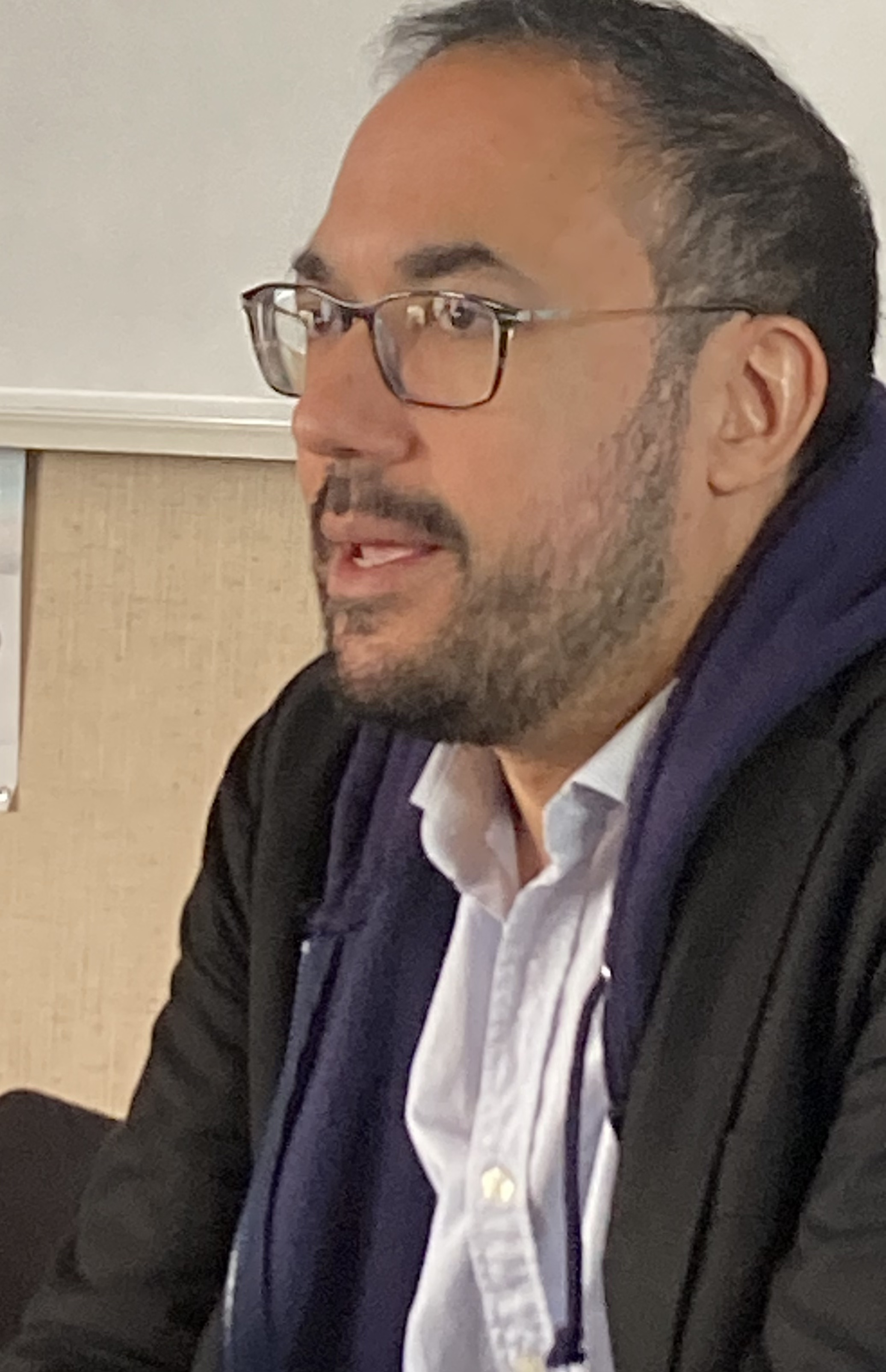
- Born: 18 January 1977 (age 49); Bordeaux, France

Academic background
- Education: Paris 1 Panthéon-Sorbonne University (Sorbonne); Sciences Po (Paris Institute of Political Sciences)

Academic work
- Institutions: King's College London (University of London); Paris 1 Panthéon-Sorbonne University(Sorbonne)
- Notable works: Global history, Colonial empire, Counterfactual thinking, History of Asia

Pierre Singaravélou (born 18 January 1977) is a French Global historian who is a British Academy Global Professor of History at King's College London. He is also full Professor of Modern History at Paris 1 Panthéon-Sorbonne University and director of the Center for Asian History (Sorbonne). Professor Singaravélou is the former director of the Sorbonne University Press and an honorary fellow of the Institut universitaire de France (IUF, Academic Institute of France).

== Career ==
From 2009 to 2014, he was senior lecturer at the Paris 1 Panthéon-Sorbonne University (Sorbonne) in the Department of history, and also taught at the University of Lausanne in Switzerland. He then became a Fellow at the Institut universitaire de France (IUF, Academic Institute of France) from 2013 to 2018. As of 2015, he is full professor of modern history at the Paris 1 Panthéon-Sorbonne University. At the same time, he was appointed director of the Sorbonne University Press from 2015 to 2019. He is currently British Academy Global Professor at King's College London.

== Research ==
Singaravélou specialises in the modern period and has written extensively on global history and the history of colonial empires.

He is the author of several books, TV Documentaries and international exhibitions in French, English and Spanish. His particular focus has been on the ways in which empires exploit, adapt to, and are often disrupted by global movements. His works show how Globalisation was decisively shaped by nineteenth-century imperialism. He is co-editor of Monde(s), French journal of Global history, and the founding editor of the book series "histoire-monde". He occasionally writes op-eds for the French newspaper Le Monde and Libération. In 2021, he presented a series on the French public radio France Culture entitled 40 objects of globalisation.

=== Social sciences in colonial context ===
Singaravélou began his research by proposing a social and political history of French Orientalism in Asia from the end of the 19th century to the 1950s. In his first book on the French School of the Far East, he demonstrated both the continuing archaeological predations in Indochina and the decisive role of Asian intellectuals in the elaboration of knowledge. Then Singaravélou brought together the social and intellectual history of the social sciences with imperial history. In his book Professing Empire, he understood the ways in which French academic culture interacted with colonial expansion, through the institutionalisation of the colonial sciences between 1880 and 1940.

=== Counterfactual thinking ===
In his book, written with Q. Deluermoz and published by Yale University Press in 2021, Singaravélou examines counterfactual history, futures past, and alternate histories of the future. A Past of Possibilities. A History of What Could Have Been explores the limits and potentials of counterfactual thinking, providing a survey of its uses, methodological issues on the possible in history and social sciences, and practical proposals for using counterfactual history in research and the wider public.

=== Imperial Globalisation in China ===
His book Tianjin Cosmopolis (2017) is focused on a short period of time, between 1900 and 1902, when an international government took over the Chinese city of Tianjin. Singaravélou studies also the establishment of nine imperial powers in the city and its agglomeration, in the form of foreign concessions, which quickly became, under the modernising influence of Chinese elites, a unique place for interaction between natives and foreigners. His work shows how part of the Chinese elites were able to meet the challenges of internationalisation at the end of the nineteenth-century.

=== France in the World ===
Singaravélou was one of the coordinators of France in the World. A New Global History published in 2017 under the direction of Patrick Boucheron. The book was released during the French presidential election and became a best-seller in France. The authors were attacked by Eric Zemmour and far-right intellectuals. This work had a great influence in almost all European countries where historians explicitly draw on this French book to propose their own version : Italy (Storia mondiale dell'Italia), Sicily (Storia mondiale della Sicilia), Netherlands (Wereldgeschiedenis van Nederland), Flanders (Wereldgeschiedenis van Vlaanderen), Spain (Historia mundial de España), Catalonia (Història mundial de Catalunya) and Germany (Deutschland. Globalgeschichte einer Nation).

=== The Globalization of Museums ===
In 2018, Pierre Singaravélou curated the first exhibition of cartographic works in a museum of art and archaeology, "The World seen from Asia" at the (Guimet Museum, offering an inversion of the Eurocentric perspective. From 2020 to 2021, at the (Musée d'Orsay), he developed the research program "The Worlds of Orsay", which proposed to reinstate the museum's collections (painting, furniture, sculpture, photography, etc.) in a worldwide context. Pierre Singaravélou held the Chair of the (Louvre Museum (Paris) in 2022 that allowed him to study the lost museums of the Louvre in the 19th century: ethnographic museum, marine museum, Spanish museum, Algerian museum, Mexican museum, Chinese museum, all of which made the Louvre a unique laboratory for experimentation.

== Books ==
In English

- Decolonization (with Karim Miské and Marc Ball); Other Press, 2022
- A Past of Possibilities: A History of What Could Have Been (with Quentin Deluermoz); Yale University Press, 2021
- Mapping the World. Perspectives from Asian Cartography (with Fabrice Argounès); Singapore National Library, 2021
- France in the World. A New Global History; Other Press, 2019 (Co-editor with Patrick Boucheron as director)

In French

- L' École française d'Extrême-Orient ou L'institution des marges (1898-1956). Essai d'histoire sociale et politique de la science coloniale; L'Harmattan, 1999 - CNRS Éditions, 2019
- L'Empire des géographes. Géographie, exploration et colonisation 19e-20e s.; Belin, 2008
- Au sommet de l'Empire. Les Élites européennes dans les colonies du 16e au 20e siècle; Peter Lang, 2009 (Co-editor)
- L'Empire des sports. Une histoire de la mondialisation culturelle; Belin, 2010 (with Julien Sorez)
- Territoires impériaux. Une histoire spatiale du fait colonial; Publications de la Sorbonne, 2011 (with Hélène Blais and Florence Deprest)
- Professer l'Empire. Les « Sciences coloniales » en France sous la IIIe République; Publications de la Sorbonne, 2011
- Atlas des Empires coloniaux 19e-20e siècles; Autrement, 2012 (with Jean-François Klein and Marie-Albane de Suremain)
- Les Empires coloniaux. XIXe-XXe siècle; Éditions du Seuil, 2013
- Pour une histoire des possibles. Analyses contrefactuelles et futurs non advenus; Éditions du Seuil, 2016 (with Quentin Deluermoz)
- Tianjin Cosmopolis. Une autre histoire de la mondialisation; Éditions du Seuil, 2017
- Histoire du Monde au XIXe siècle; Fayard, 2017 (Co-editor with Sylvain Venayre)
- Le Monde vu d'Asie. Une histoire cartographique; Éditions du Seuil, 2018 (with Fabrice Argounès)
- Décolonisations; Éditions du Seuil/ Arte éditions, 2020 (with Karim Miské and Marc Ball)
- Dictionnaire historique de la comparaison; Éditions de la Sorbonne, 2020 (Co-editor)
- Le Magasin du Monde. La mondialisation par les objets du XVIIIe siècle à nos jours; Fayard, 2020 (with Sylvain Venayre)
- Les Mondes d'Orsay; Éditions du Seuil / Musée d'Orsay, 2021
- L'Epicerie du Monde. La mondialisation par les produits alimentaires du XVIIIe siècle à nos jours; Fayard, 2022 (with Sylvain Venayre)

== Exhibitions ==
- The World Seen From Asia (Guimet Museum Guimet National Museum of Asian Arts, 2018)
- Another History of the World (Museum of European and Mediterranean Civilisations) (Marseille, France, 2019-2022
- The Worlds of Orsay (Musée d'Orsay) (Paris, 2020–2021)
- Mapping the World. Perspectives from Asian cartography (National Library, Singapore)(Singapore, 2021–2022)

== Filmography ==
- Decolonizations, TV documentary series (3 X 52 minutes), written with K. Miské and M. Ball, that presents an engaging overview of colonial history, and broadcast on Arte (European Public Service Channel, January 2020). The voice-over is spoken by the French actor Reda Kateb. The series was awarded '39th International URTI Grand Prix for Author's Documentary' (UNESCO) in November 2020
