= Extra Large =

Extra Large may refer to:

- Extra large, a clothing size
- XL - Extra Large, 2008 Indonesian film
- Extra Large (2022 film), a short film by Barbara Butch
