= Thomas Jolly =

French actor and artistic director (born 1982)

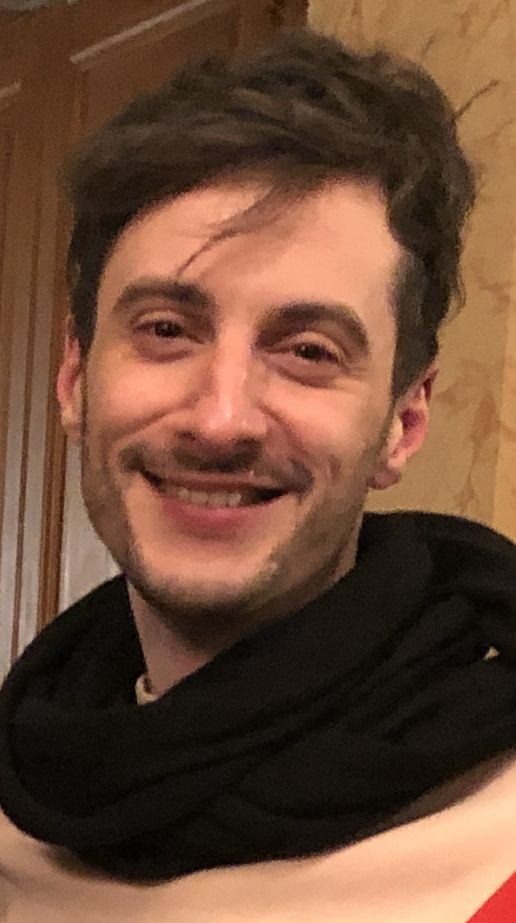
- Jolly in 2019
- Born: Rouen, France
- Occupations: Actor; director; artistic director
- Years active: 2006–present
- Known for: Founder of La Piccola Familia, Artistic director of the 2024 Summer Olympic and Paralympic Games ceremonies
- Notable work: H6R3, Thyeste, Starmania

Thomas Jolly is a French actor and artistic director of La Piccola Familia, a theatre company that he founded in Rouen in 2006.

Jolly's early life in Normandy was marked by a strong interest in theater, performing from a young age in his hometown of La Rue-Saint-Pierre. He began acting in 1993 and joined the children's theatre company, Théâtre d'enfants, in Rouen. He later studied theatre at the University of Caen and the National School of the Théâtre National de Bretagne in Rennes, where he directed his first play, Jean-Luc Lagarce's "Photography".

In 2006, Jolly established La Piccola Familia. He directed the national drama center Le Quai d'Angers from January 1, 2020, until November 2022. He was the artistic director of the opening and closing ceremonies for the 2024 Summer Olympic Games and also the opening and closing ceremonies for the 2024 Summer Paralympic Games in Paris, the former of which was criticized by Christian denominations and socially conservative politicians.

== Early life and schooling ==
Jolly grew up near Rouen, in Normandy, France. He is the son of a printer and a nurse.

From a young age, he exhibited a penchant for the theatrical, often staging shows at home in La Rue-Saint-Pierre, a small village in Seine-Maritime. Before he started performing "Seven Farces for Schoolchildren" by Pierre Gripari, a book his mother gave him when he was about six years old, Jolly was staging scenes from cartoons. He has fond memories of playing Cleopatra while a friend played the taster in their version of Asterix and Cleopatra.

He spent holidays at his grandparents' house near Saint-Martin-du-Vivier. His grandfather gave catechism classes to children in their house. Although Jolly did not receive a religious education, he would listen from the next room without fully understanding. His grandmother, a former nurse, left a lasting impression on him because of her elegant manner and whimsical style of clothing.

Jolly began acting in 1993 in Rouen and joined the children's theatre company, Théâtre d'enfants, directed by Nathalie Barrabé. He then attended Jeanne-d'Arc High School in the "Theatre" class, working under the guidance of actors from the Théâtre des Deux Rives.

Starting in 1999, alongside pursuing a degree in theatre studies at the University of Caen, he created a university theatre troupe and performed in several regional festivals. In 2001, he joined the professional training for actor interns at ACTEA (La Cité Théâtre) in Caen, directed by Olivier Lopez.

In 2003, he entered the National School of the Théâtre National de Bretagne in Rennes, led by Stanislas Nordey.

During his studies at the Théâtre National de Bretagne, Jolly had the opportunity to direct a play for the first time. In 2005, under the guidance of Stanislas Nordey, he chose Jean-Luc Lagarce's Photography for his debut production.

== Career ==
After completing his studies he formed his own company, La Piccola Familia.

He directed an 18-hour production of Shakespeare's Henry VI trilogy at the Festival d'Avignon in 2014.

In 2018, he was invited to open the festival with a production of Seneca's Thyeste.

In January 2020, he was named director of the national theatre of the city of Angers (Le Quai).

In 2022 he presented Henry VI and Richard III as a 24-hour marathon entitled H6R3.

He directed the revival of cult musical Starmania which debuted in 2022. By 2024; the critically acclaimed production had attracted over a million French and Francophone viewers.

=== 2024 Summer Olympics ===
In September 2022, Jolly was appointed artistic director of the opening and closing ceremonies of the 2024 Summer Olympics in collaboration with Thierry Reboul. Tony Estanguet, president of Paris 2024, stated that Jolly was "a bold choice, consistent with our vision". Jolly presented an artistic staging, structured around a series of 12 tableaux, designed to be inclusive and representative of France, declaring "above all, I want this ceremony to include everyone. We must all celebrate this diversity."

Tasked with telling the story of culture, people, and history of France, Jolly used the cityscape as his setting. He stated before the ceremony that "France is a story that never stops being constructed, deconstructed, and reconstructed. It’s alive, it remains alive." While opening ceremonies have typically taken place in a stadium, the 2024 ceremony followed 6 km of the Seine. A flotilla of 85 boats carried athletes down the river as artistic performances were interspersed through twelve acts. The four-hour ceremony began with Lady Gaga singing at Île Saint-Louis, passing by landmarks such as Notre-Dame de Paris, Conciergerie, and the Louvre, and concluded with Céline Dion singing Hymne à l'amour from the Eiffel Tower.

The show had strong themes of diversity and LGBTQ+ rights; Jolly himself is gay and was bullied as a child for supposedly being effeminate. The "Festivité" segment of the ceremony contained a scene of drag queens arranged in a row along a catwalk. A statement from Paris 2024 said that it was inspired by Leonardo da Vinci's fresco The Last Supper, which depicts Jesus and the Twelve Apostles, while Jolly held it to represent "a pagan feast linked to the gods of Olympus". As such, it was criticised by socially conservative politicians and Christians as blasphemous.

Responding to the criticism in a press conference, Jolly stated that "We wanted to include everyone, as simple as that. In France, we have freedom of creation, artistic freedom. We are lucky in France to live in a free country. I didn't have any specific messages that I wanted to deliver. In France, we are a republic, we have the right to love whom we want, we have the right not to be worshippers, we have a lot of rights in France, and this is what I wanted to convey." The next day, on BFM TV, he denied having been inspired by The Last Supper. On 28 July, organisers issued an apology for the performance, stating that "there was never an intention to show disrespect to any religious group". French president Emmanuel Macron praised the "audacity" of Jolly's work and stated "the French and the whole world were very proud of this opening ceremony, it made us very proud."

=== Harassment and threats ===
Following a complaint by Jolly, French prosecutors started an official investigation into death threats and cyber-harassment directed at him. Jolly reported receiving threatening and abusive messages on social media. This probe, overseen by the French judiciary's online hate division, may lead to charges such as defamation, public abuse, and threats based on origin and sexual orientation.

Jolly reported that the threats he received included comments about his supposed Jewish heritage and sexual orientation. Although Jolly is gay, he is not Jewish and has no immediate ties to Israel. Reports from French media indicated that a considerable portion of the abusive messages were in English and seemed to originate from the United States.

The Paris 2024 organizing committee strongly condemned the threats and harassment against Jolly and other artists involved in the opening ceremony, expressing their full support.

== Theatre ==
=== Director ===
- 2006: Harlequin, refined by love|Arlequin poli par l'amour by Marivaux
- 2008: Toâ by Sacha Guitry
- 2010: A Night at the Ravalets
- 2010: Pool (No Water) by Mark Ravenhill
- 2011: Harlequin, refined by love by Marivaux (recreation)
- 2012: Henri VI by William Shakespeare (first cycle)
- 2012: We Are Still So Young in Crime
- 2013: Box Office by Damien Gabriac
- 2014: Henry VI by William Shakespeare (second cycle)
- 2015: Richard III by William Shakespeare
- 2016: Le Radeau de la Méduse by Georg Kaiser
- 2016: The Sky, the Night and the Glorious Stone, Chronicles of the Avignon Festival from 1947 to... 2086, Jardin Ceccano, Avignon
- 2016: Eliogabalo by Francesco Cavalli at the Opéra Garnier
- 2017: Fantasio by Jacques Offenbach at the Opéra Comique
- 2018: A Garden of Silence, a musical show by L. (Raphaële Lannadère) in Vannes
- 2018: Thyeste by Seneca, Cour d'honneur du Palais des papes, Festival d'Avignon
- 2019: Macbeth Underworld, music by Pascal Dusapin, La Monnaie, Brussels
- 2020: The Night of Madame Lucienne by Copi, Le Quai CDN of Angers
- 2022: The Dragon by Evgueni Schwartz, Le Quai CDN of Angers
- 2022: Starmania by Michel Berger and Luc Plamondon
- 2023: Romeo and Juliet by Charles Gounod, Opéra Bastille, Paris
- 2024: Opening and closing ceremonies of the 2024 Summer Olympics
- 2024: Opening and closing ceremonies of the 2024 Summer Paralympics

=== Actor ===
- 2005: Splendid's by Jean Genet, directed by Cédric Gourmelon
- 2006: Peanuts and Genoa 01 by Fausto Paravidino, directed by Stanislas Nordey
- 2007: Arlequin poli par l'amour by Marivaux: Harlequin
- 2008: Toâ by Sacha Guitry
- 2010: Piscine (pas d'eau) by Mark Ravenhill
- 2011: The Race of Mars / The Feast of Death
- 2012: Henri VI by William Shakespeare (first cycle)
- 2013: The Contagion of Darkness / The Viper's Tooth
- 2013: The Purple of the Blood / The Winter of Discontent
- 2014: Henry VI by William Shakespeare (second cycle)
- 2015: Richard III by William Shakespeare: Richard III
- 2016: All the Children Want to Do Like the Grown-Ups by Laurent Cazanave
- 2016: The Sky, the Night and the Glorious Stone
- 2018: Thyeste by Seneca, Cour d'honneur du Palais des papes, Festival d'Avignon: Atreus
- 2018: A Garden of Silence, a musical show by L. (Raphaële Lannadère)
- 2019: Le Chandelier (The Candlestick) by Alfred de Musset, directed by Bruno Bayeux: Fortunio
- 2021: Mithridate by Jean Racine, directed by Éric Vigner: Xiphares

== Awards ==
- 2015: Molière for "Best Director of a Public Theatre Play" for his production of Henry VI (play)
- 2023: Molière for "Best Musical Show" and Molière for "Best Visual and Sound Creation" for his re-creation of Starmania (musical)
