= Axelle Saint-Cirel =

French jazz singer

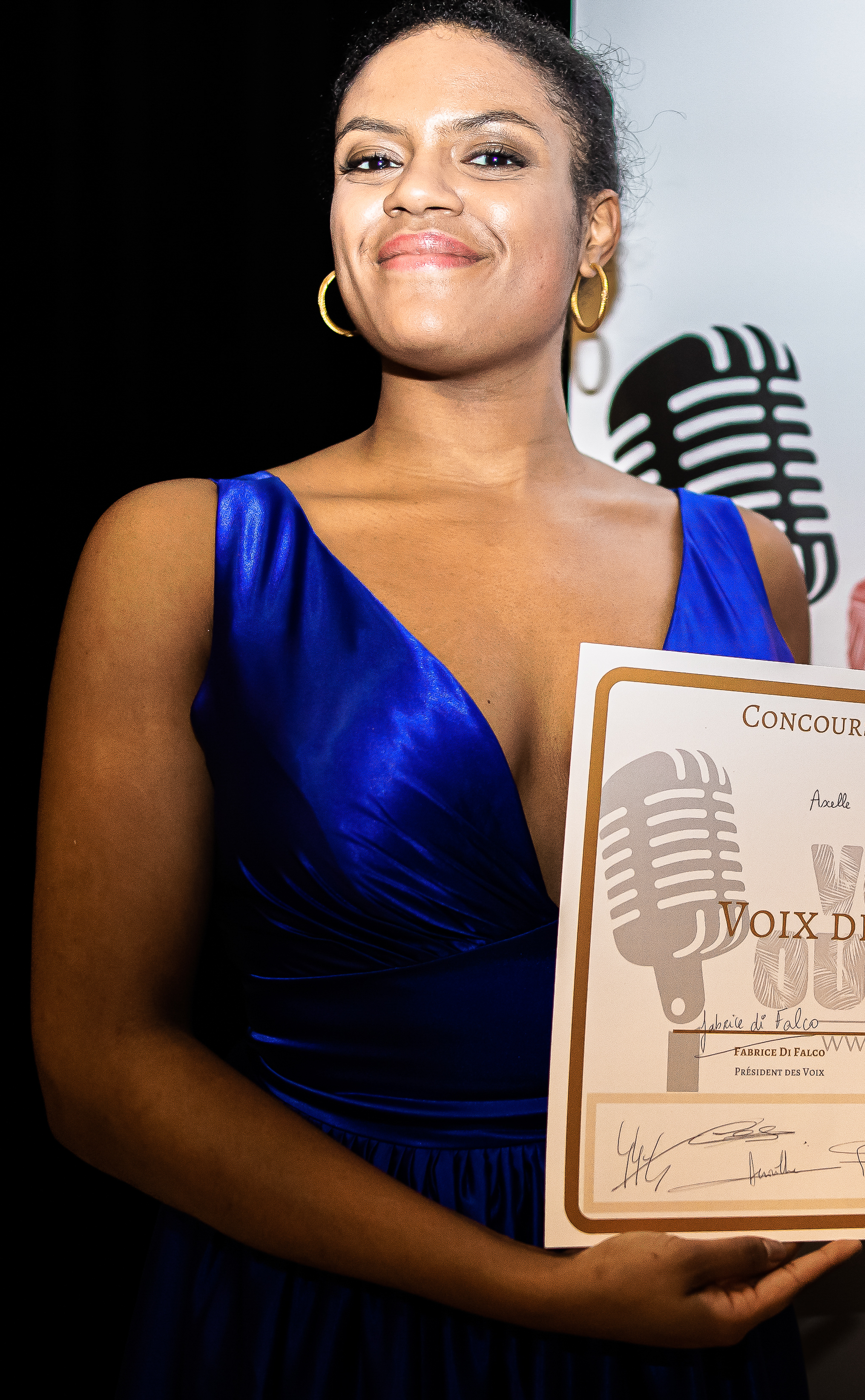
- Saint-Cirel in 2023

Background information
- Born: 3 June 1995 (age 30); Île-de-France, France
- Origin: France
- Occupation: Opera singer

Axelle Saint-Cirel (born 3 June 1995) is a French mezzo-soprano. She became well known to the general public for singing the French national anthem La Marseillaise at the opening ceremony of the 2024 Summer Olympic Games.

== Childhood and education ==
Born in 1995 in the region of Paris to parents from Guadeloupe, Saint-Cirel spent part of her childhood in Malaysia. She then returned with her parents and attended the conservatory at Montbéliard. It was there that she was trained in lyrical singing, which allowed her to play a role in the opera Nox by Jacopo Baboni-Schilingi in Tokyo, New York, Beijing, and Shanghai.

In 2017, Saint-Cirel attended the Pôle Supérieur de Boulogne-Billancourt. She then attended the Paris Conservatory in 2019.

== Career ==
In February 2024, Saint-Cirel won the final of the 5th edition of the Overseas Voices Competition held at the Paris Opera and broadcast on Culturebox.

She collaborated with Camélia Jordana, and played Anita in a production of West Side Story at the Paris Conservatory.

On 26 July 2024, Saint-Cirel sang La Marseillaise during the opening ceremony of the 2024 Summer Olympics in Paris, perched on top of the roof of the Grand Palais.

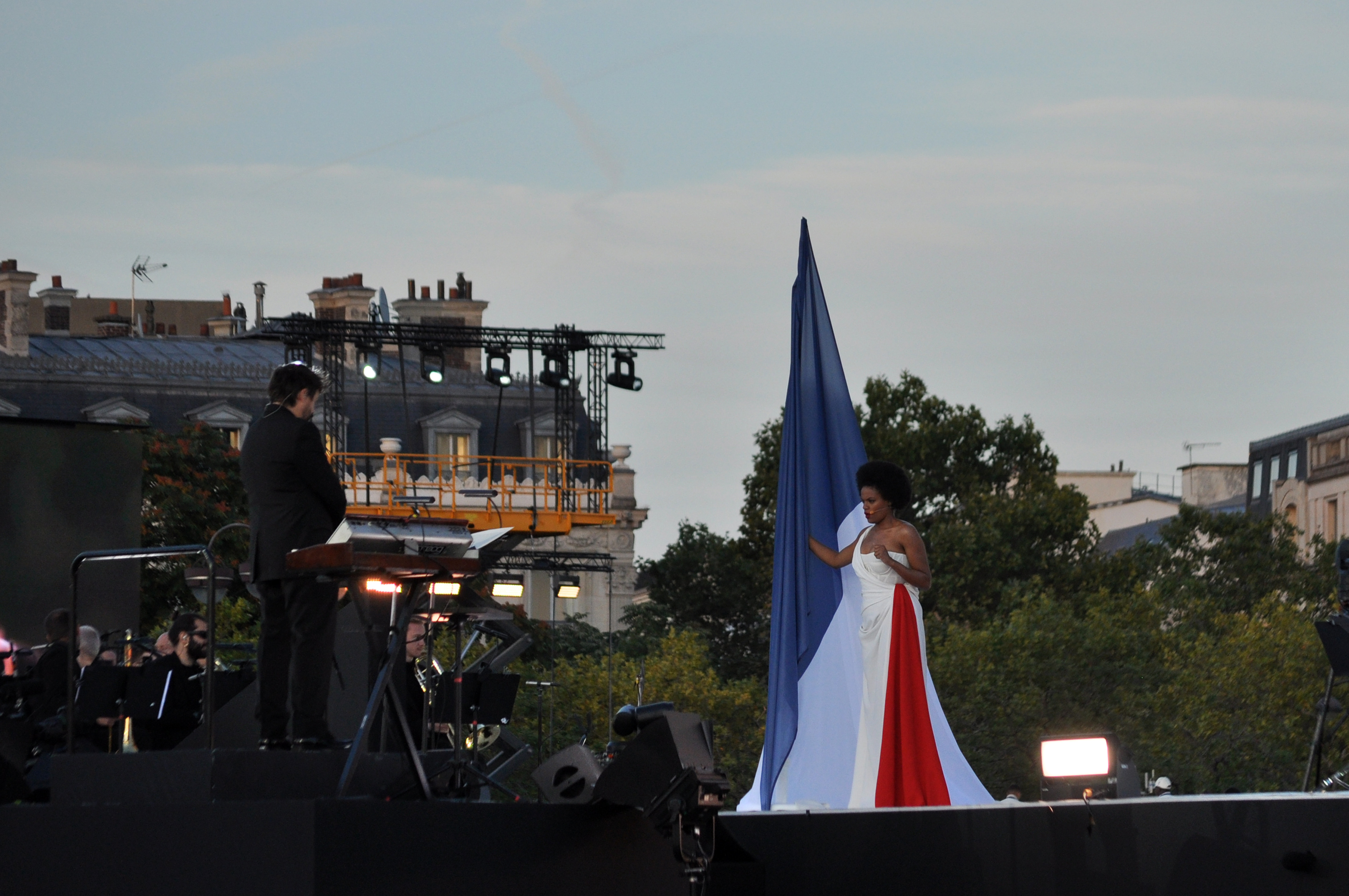
Saint-Cirel during the Parade des Champions, Champs Elysees, Paris, 2024
