= 2024 Summer Olympics opening ceremony =

- Part of 2024 Summer Olympics
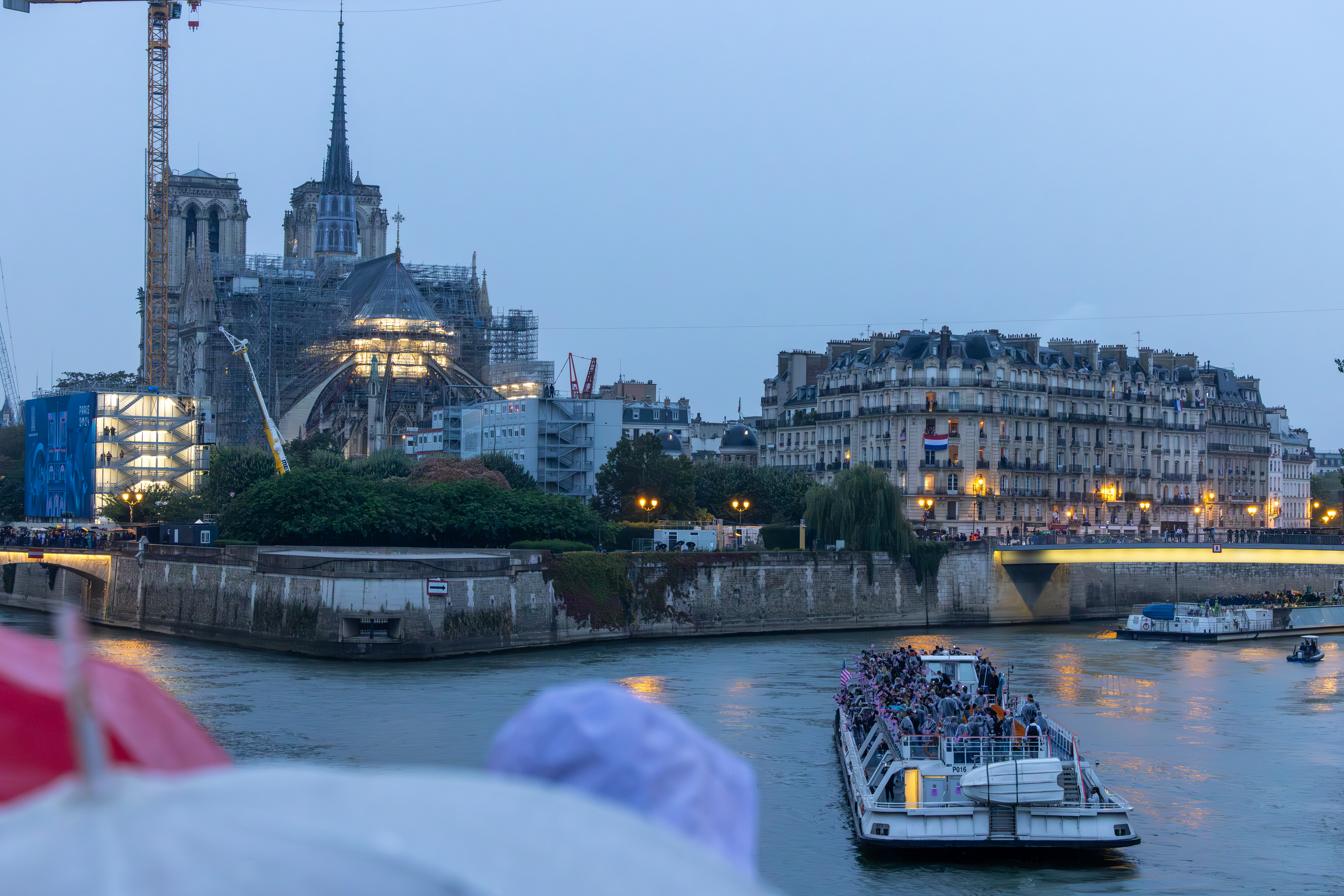
- The United States delegation aboard the Bateau Mouche L'Espoir pass by Notre Dame
- Date: 26 July 2024; 2 years ago
- Time: 19:30 – 23:30 CEST (UTC+2)
- Venue: Jardins du Trocadéro; Seine River
- Location: Paris, France; 48°51′24″N 2°21′8″E
- Also known as: Ça Ira (It'll Be Fine)
- Filmed by: Olympic Broadcasting Services (OBS)
- Footage: 2024 Summer Olympics Opening Ceremony in Olympic Channel on YouTube

The opening ceremony of the 2024 Summer Olympics took place on 26 July 2024 across Paris, beginning at 19:30 CEST (17:30 UTC). As mandated by the Olympic Charter, the proceedings included an artistic program showcasing the culture of the host country and city, the parade of athletes and the lighting of the Olympic cauldron. The Games were formally opened by the president of France, Emmanuel Macron. The ceremony marked the 130th anniversary of the International Olympic Committee, the centenary of the 1924 Summer and Winter Olympics in France, and the 235th anniversary of the French Revolution.

Directed by Thomas Jolly, the opening ceremony was held outside of a stadium for the first time in modern Olympic history. Athletes were paraded by boat along the Seine to a temporary venue at the Jardins du Trocadéro, where the official protocols took place. The parade was interspersed with the artistic programme, which was divided into twelve acts reflecting the culture of France and its history, and took place at Paris landmarks such as Notre-Dame, Conciergerie, Musée d'Orsay, and the Eiffel Tower. The ceremony featured musical performances by French musicians such as Gojira, Aya Nakamura, Philippe Katerine, and Juliette Armanet, and international musicians Lady Gaga and Céline Dion.

The ceremony received mixed reviews, with many praising its artistic segments, musical performances, and grand finale, but criticizing the length of the ceremony and other production issues brought about by the format. The ceremony's use of camp elements received a mixed reception. A segment said to be celebrating diversity, and featuring drag, was criticized by Christian and conservative organizations and figures for allegedly referencing The Last Supper, which some critics interpreted as mocking Christianity, though Jolly denied that this was the intent.

In December 2024, the Olympic Channel released a full length documentary about the creation and development of the opening ceremony, called La Grande Seine. In February 2025, the presentation of "Mea Culpa (Ah! Ça ira!)" by Gojira, Marina Viotti and Victor Le Masne at the opening ceremony received the Grammy Award for Best Metal Performance.

== Preparations ==
Logistics preparations were expected to be finalized by the end of 2023, with certain rehearsals occurring in some secret venues without public presence before the event. In some specific situations, they were carried out on-site, and were considered "teasers" by Thierry Reboul, executive director for the Games. The first camera test shots were done in September 2023 and coverage of the event was expected to be provided by 130 cameras placed in strategic positions. The event was broadcast live to 80 giant screens along the route of the Seine. Directed and created by theatre and television actor and director Thomas Jolly, it was the first opening ceremony held outside of an Olympic stadium since the 2018 Summer Youth Olympics held in Buenos Aires. The choreography was created by Maud Le Pladec.

In the first phase of planning, the Games' Organizing Committee originally expected attendance to be upwards of 500,000 non-paying people and an additional 100,000 paying spectators on the lower quays of the river, for an expected total of 600,000. Although the 2024 Winter Youth Olympics held in Gangwon were the first to have a ticket-holding audience following the end of the COVID-19 pandemic, this was the first time in the senior Olympics since the 2018 Winter Olympics to allow international spectators, after the 2022 Winter Olympics opening ceremony having a reduced number of local spectators. However, after a suggestion in May 2023 by Amélie Oudéa-Castéra, the French Minister for Sport and the Olympic and Paralympic Games, that this be limited to between 300,000 and 400,000 free of charge, and after additional concerns of security and logistics, the figure was reduced to a maximum of 300,000 in November 2023. In late December 2023, a further reduction was proposed, as security services would have preferred the ceremony in a stadium to facilitate implementing security measures. The stands stretched from the François Mitterrand Library to the Eiffel Tower.

The public lined the banks of the Seine, sitting on a 6-kilometre (3.7 mi) stretch on the upper and lower quays as well of rivers that cross each side of the river. The organizing team counted between 6,000 and 8,000 volunteers and workers. The ceremony directors had originally projected 2,000 dancers, but this was lowered to 400 dancers in a total of 3,000 performers. All personnel involved in water, air and land performances in total numbered 45,000, with an average of per 3,750 people per square kilometre (9,700/sq mi). This figure does not include the roughly 2,000 security agents required to monitor the entry tents of paid ticketholders and law enforcement located on the elevated docks throughout the course. The cast and athletes started their travel on the river from the Pont d'Austerlitz to the Pont d'Iena, in front of the Eiffel Tower and the Jardins du Trocadéro, where the main protocol was held. The closest the general public could get to the athletes and parade on the Seine were on docked parties and the restaurant boats.

In May 2023, the first series of tickets for the event went on sale via ballot for the first time, with prices ranging from €90 to €2,700, with the latter being the most expensive tickets overall for the Games.

In early 2022, the city government announced that due to security concerns, the riverside book stalls could be removed, leading to legal disputes until 13 February 2024, when the French President Emmanuel Macron shelved the plan.

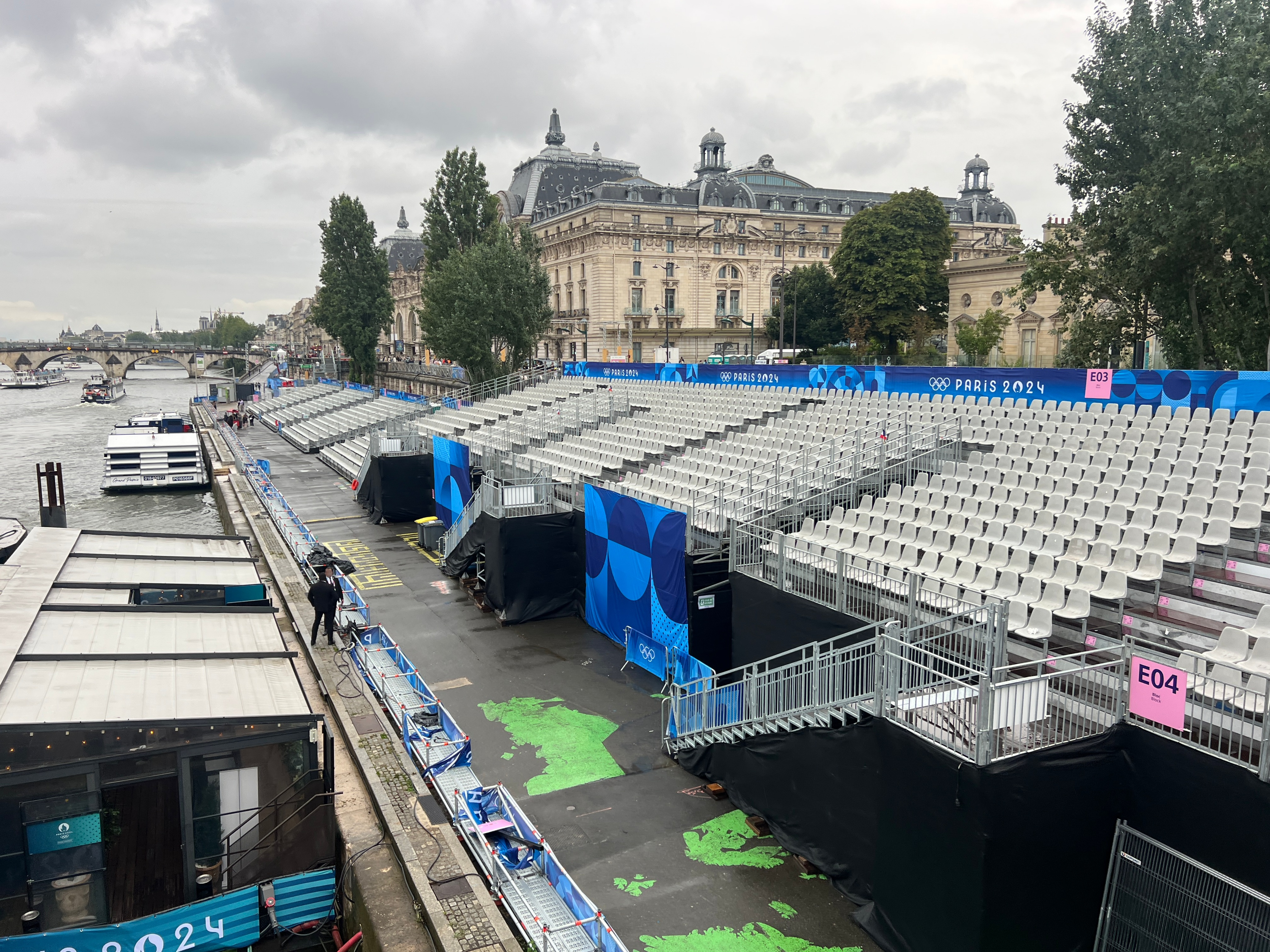
Bleachers along the Seine prior to the ceremony parade

The total number of boats and barges was near 160, with around 58 taking part in a reduced rehearsal carried out in July 2023, carrying athlete delegations, television crews and emergency services. 7,000 of the 10,500 athletes were expected to take part. 6,800 actually ended up participating. In April 2023, 116 vessels from 42 river companies had been committed, with an expected 98% of all boats to be used being based in the Paris Metropolitan Area and the rest from regional boat companies, including local sponsor Highfield Boats. Some boats that carried some delegations are Bateaux Mouches that routinely sail the Seine.

In February 2024, it was announced the number of spectators to attend the opening ceremony would be reduced from the proposed 600,000 spectators to around 300,000. There were 100,000 paid tickets for the ceremony, with around 200,000 free tickets. The next month an exact amount of 326,000 tickets was stated, with 104,000 paid tickets for the lowest bank and 222,000 free tickets for the higher banks. The free tickets were distributed in three rounds and aimed at families with low incomes living in underprivileged areas, sports movements, schools, volunteers and local workers including traders. As originally proposed, no free tickets were given to group of tourists.

The general rehearsal of the ceremony, which was scheduled for 24 June 2024, was postponed due to a strong flow in the Seine River. It was rescheduled for 16 July 2024.

Thierry Reboul, COJOP 2024 Director of Ceremonies, claimed that the inspiration for the event came in 2019 when he was walking along the river; the original plans were to hold the ceremony at the Stade de France. But COJOP2024 head Tony Estanguet wished from the start to "throw away the rule book". Parisian mayor Anne Hidalgo assembled a committee to develop the creative aspects of the ceremony before COJOP2024 hired a creative director. The committee's chair, Patrick Boucheron, would eventually be one of the four individuals hired by Jolly to develop the script. Even before being chosen to plan the ceremony, Jolly had "dreamed of delegations arriving by hot air balloon, a French invention, and of the heads of dead kings rising from the Seine to watch the ceremony", yet this idea was not implemented. Jolly and four scriptwriters planned the ceremony. They wore puffer jackets while going out on boats along the river from the Austerlitz Bridge to the Eiffel Tower. After these excursions, they spent nine months writing the ceremony script. They took inspiration from the history of Paris, and its main themes consisted of love and "shared humanity".

After determining 12 important scenes of French history to represent, Jolly hired four subdirectors to develop the sounds, costumes and choreography of the event. Daphné Bürki and Olivier Bériot were in charge of costumes while Maud Le Pladec was entrusted the choreography and dance, with Victor Le Masne chosen as the musical director. Certain elements and sequences were not able to be implemented such as having performers lean out of the Hôtel-Dieu, Paris decommissioned hospital building due to asbestos. Other plans that did not go through included a performance that would take place near a fish hatchery by the Béthune Quay on the bank of the Seine, which was not to be disturbed, a mass of dancers on a bridge that would have caused its collapse, and an undisclosed scene that had been reworked 73 times by May 2024. In total, 3,000 performers took part, with at least 400 of these being professional dancers.

Since the water level would rise or fall depending on the weather, the organizers developed "an artificial intelligence software to cast the route in 3-D so [Jolly] could visualize high and low water levels, rain, even storms".

One year after the Games in July 2025, The Hollywood Reporter reported that the opening ceremony costed approximately $108 million (€91.7 million); a similar cost estimate to that of the 2008 Summer Olympics opening ceremony in Beijing.

=== Safety measures ===
In October 2023, following security concerns caused by the Russian invasion of Ukraine, the Gaza war and the Arras school stabbing, both the French government and the Paris Organising Committee for the 2024 Olympic and Paralympic Games (COJOP2024) stated there were no official plans to relocate, stating that "Plan A takes into account all of the threats". Oudéa-Castréa stated on BFM TV that they were paying attention to context and the government had been working on "adjustment variables", wishing to maintain the original format. In December 2023, President Macron stated that there were multiple scenarios for the ceremony, in case of a major security event which would force it to move from the Seine. On this, COJOP2024 stated they had "contingency plans for all identified risk scenarios: heatwaves, cyberattacks, and the ceremony is no exception". In April 2024 President Macron announced that in case of a terrorism threat, there was a plan B, and even plan C; in that case the opening ceremony would be moved to the Trocadero or to the Stade de France stadium. Nevertheless, Christophe Dubi, the IOC Games executive director, stated the previous in March that a change to the Stade de France would be unlikely due to the event being "too big, too sophisticated, too complex artistically to look at a Plan B in another location".

In April 2024, it was announced all buildings with a view of the Seine would have extra anti-terrorism protection. Several areas near the Seine river, metro stations and adjacent museums including the Louvre, Orsay and the Decorative Arts Museums would be closed. Being the largest ever security operation in France since the end of World War II, after the closure of bridges from 8 July 2024, 18 days ahead of the opening ceremony, a security perimeter was placed around the ceremony sites from 18 July, 8 days ahead of the ceremony. The perimeter included, among others, prohibition of motorized access, controlled access for pedestrians with people within the perimeter subjected to a personal "Games pass". All airports and airspace in a 90 miles (140 km) radius would be closed during the ceremony, and 45,000 security officers, including over 2,000 foreign police, would be stationed in Paris during the ceremony.

In the hours before the ceremonies, spectators faced long queues as well as ticketing obstacles. Many of the gates opened over an hour later than previously scheduled due to a lack of scanners to process all tickets. That morning, a series of arson attacks damaged the lines of the French railway system. International and domestic rail services were widely disrupted, with around 800,000 passengers affected. There was also an attempted attack on LGV Sud-Est line, though it was interrupted by TGV maintenance workers who happened to be on site.

On the day of the ceremony, sequences were altered for safety reasons owing to the heavy rainfall forecast during the ceremony – with around a third of the Synchronicité sequence cut, and the removal of dancers from Parisian rooftops.

=== Protocolar elements and torch relay ===
The Parade of Nations, in which the expected number of 10,500 participating athletes from 204 National Olympic Committees move in public view grouped by their respective delegation, took place on the Seine, with other ceremonial events being held at the Jardins du Trocadéro.

The Parade had as its main inspiration Jean-Paul Goude's 200th anniversary parade of the French Revolution on Bastille Day in 1989 which was described in comparison as "an anti-national festival that rolled all of us into a "worldwide melting pot, with an optimism that we've lost today". Taking inspiration from the homonym of the French for "stage" (scène) and the river Seine, the artistic portion of the event depicted 12 scenes from French history. It was expected to be the grandest event on the Seine in 285 years since the celebrations organized by Louis XV for his daughter's wedding with Philip, Duke of Parma in 1739. President Macron stated that the ceremony would include a "great story of emancipation and freedom", marking events from the French Revolution to the Universal Declaration of Human Rights, the latter having been signed at the exact same place the ceremony ended, the Palais de Chaillot.

Gérald Darmanin, Minister of the Interior, had estimated that 25,000 security agents would be required and that around 35,000 police officers would be deployed for the opening ceremony.

The 80-day Olympic torch relay for the Olympic flame was ended during the ceremonies. The flame was lit in Olympia, Greece, on 16 April 2024, traveling through Greece for the following 10 days before being handed to COJOP2024 on 26 April at the Panathenaic Stadium in Athens. It left Piraeus aboard the sailing ship Belem and arrived at the Old Port of Marseille on 8 May 2024 under the escort of 1,000 boats.

== Proceedings ==
=== Programme ===
Entrances to the venue were opened at 17:30 CEST with the ceremony starting two hours later at 19:30 CEST. For the first time in Olympic history, the athletes were paraded on boats such as tourist boats, ferries and yachts, and also for the first time, the parade was integrated into the artistic programme, as the Seine was the main venue for the event. Most of the ceremony took place under the rain, rather than in the sun. This was the first Summer Olympics opening ceremony in drizzle since the 2016 Summer Olympics which started with a small drizzle and it was the first to take place in rain since Helsinki 1952.

	Title	Time (CEST: UTC+2)
1	Prologue	19:30–19:39
2	Enchanté	19:39–20:04
3	Synchronicité	20:04–20:13
4	Liberté	20:13–20:22
5	Égalité	20:22–20:28
6	Fraternité	20:28–20:54
7	Sororité	20:54–21:01
8	Sportivité	21:01–21:21
9	Festivité	21:21–22:06
10	Obscurité	22:06–22:13
11	Solidarité	22:13–22:34
12	Solennité	22:34–23:05
13	Éternité	23:05–23:24
14	Epilogue	23:24–23:29

=== Prologue ===
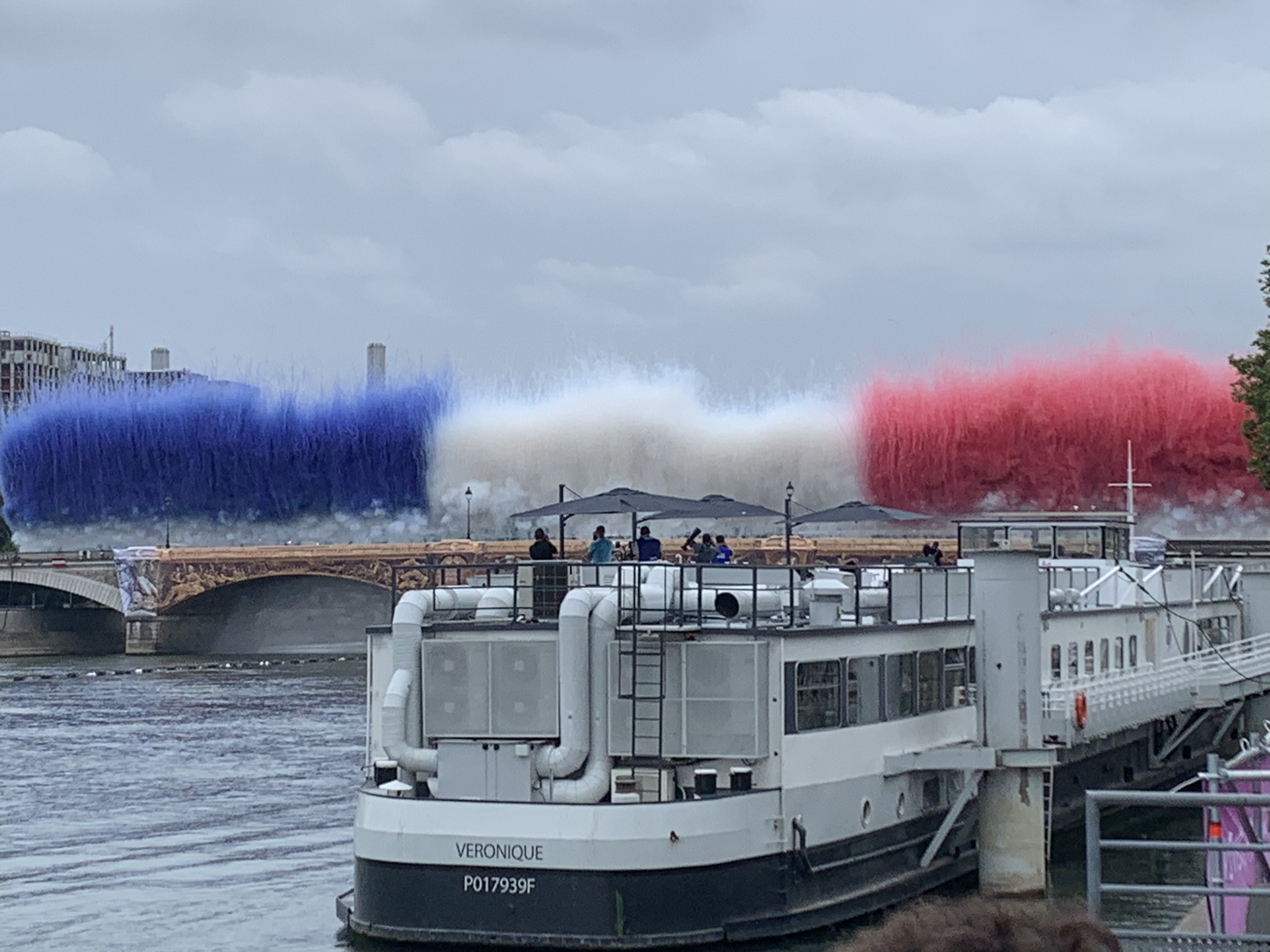
Pyrotechnics at the Pont d'Austerlitz marking the start of the Parade of Nations

After everyone was seated and the Olympic torch relay ended its metropolitan leg around the area surrounding the Stade de France, the artistic portion began with a pre-recorded video (with footage of past opening ceremonies of the Games) of comedian Jamel Debbouze as a torchbearer carrying the flame into an empty Stade de France, having not realized that the opening ceremony would be held outside the stadium. Debbouze wonders where the attendees are before clips play of newscasters around the world reporting that the ceremony would not be in a stadium, but instead along the Seine. He is approached by footballer Zinedine Zidane, who takes the torch through the city streets, leaping through a traffic jam, disrupting people at a cafe and attracting the attention of a trio of children representing the three times Paris has hosted the Games. Zidane then heads into the Paris Métro, (Note: In the video, Zidane enters the Métropolitain through entrance 3 of the Porte Dauphine station, the only original Métro entrance designed by Hector Guimard in 1900 with preserved wall panels, and the only one with a canopy that remains in its original location.) which is decorated with posters from previous Games on its billboards, and boards a train about to depart. Before the train can leave the station, it breaks down, prompting Zidane to pass the torch to the children through the train window. After traversing the Catacombs of Paris and the legendary underground lake beneath the Palais Garnier, the children are approached by a mysterious hooded and masked torchbearer rowing a boat. The trio climb aboard, putting on life jackets that are colored after the French flag and as they begin their journey to the outside world, the camera pans up to the Trocadéro stage to present in live format the authorities present at the ceremonies: Thomas Bach, president of the International Olympic Committee, and Emmanuel Macron, president of the French Republic, as they stand up to welcome the crowd. After that, the boat is rowed through a tunnel, into a light that shines to reveal the phrase "Ça ira" (literally, "will happen"; figuratively, "it'll be fine") as the boat arrived on the Seine. The parade then began on the Pont d'Austerlitz bridge (decorated in Olympic theming), as pyrotechnics in the tricolour of the flag of France, and jets of water from the Seine opened the Parade of Nations.

The masked torchbearer (Note: Nicknamed "Zorro" by France Télévisions.) was the main protagonist of the opening ceremony, serving as a connecting thread throughout the ceremony similar to how Nikki Webster was the main star of the opening ceremony of the 2000 Summer Olympics as the hero girl. The torchbearer character made appearances between segments in pre-recorded scenes, and live on the Seine, the rooftops of Paris, the city's landmarks and shows up in the middle of the performances. The torchbearer represented several mysterious masked French heroes, such as Arsène Lupin, the Phantom of the Opera, Fantômas and Phantom R, as well as modern depictions of the Olympic spirit and a diversity of characteristics of French culture. The figure was also compared to the French video game company Ubisoft's Assassin's Creed franchise characters' hoods and parkour action, especially to Arno Dorian, who appears in the 2014 installment Assassin's Creed Unity set during the French Revolution.

It was anticipated that the masked torchbearer would reveal themself at the end of the ceremony and light the cauldron, but their identity was not revealed. Shortly after the ceremony ended, professional tag player Clément Dumais wrote on Twitter that a total of 12 people had portrayed the character during the four-hour ceremony, including parkour artist Simon Nogueira, while ruling out his own participation.

=== Enchanté ===
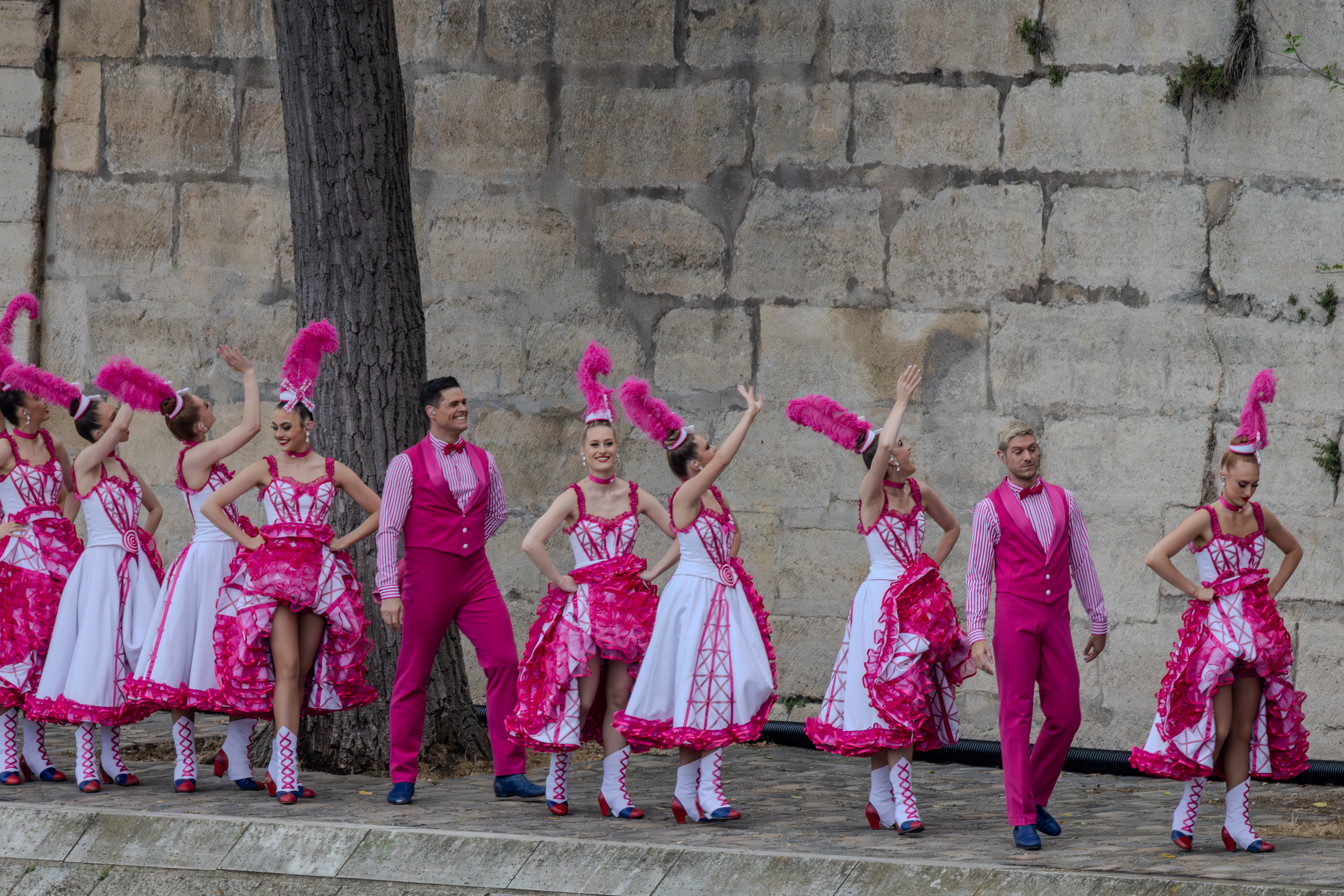
Dancers from the Moulin Rouge at the Quai d'Orleans

The first sequence, Enchanté (enchant/delight), accordionist Félicien Brut was sitting at the top of Pont d'Austerlitz played a rendition of Édith Piaf's "La Foule" began the first of the four blocs of the parade with the Greek delegation and the Refugee Olympic Team, and through to the Bahraini delegation. The first musical act featured Lady Gaga and eight dancers waving large pink ostrich feather hand fans, all in custom Dior costumes. The segment (pre-recorded for "safety reasons") alluded to "a cabaret feel" with a performance of "Mon truc en plumes", made famous by vedette Zizi Jeanmaire, on a golden staircase beside a black grand piano below Square Barye at the southeast point of Île Saint-Louis. The singer wore a black satin bustier under a black feather jacket and welcomed the audience by saying "Bonsoir, bienvenue à Paris" ("Good evening, welcome to Paris").

Recalling Piaf's song "La Vie en rose", the parade resumed with the Bangladeshi through Chinese delegations passing by the Quai de Bethune decorated with large old postcards of Parisian monuments from the Belle Époque era printed in pink and populated with a crowd of characters dressed in pink waving at them, including big head versions of famous French historical figures and characters and the Olympic Phryge in its only appearance at the ceremony. This scene was a reference to the La Rue Montorgueil painting by Claude Monet. The three children and the masked torchbearer showed up in the pink crowd and the children handed the Olympic torch to the torchbearer, who ran off with it and headed onto the rooftops with the torch in their hand. Dancers from the Moulin Rouge, also dressed in pink, then danced at the Quai d'Orleans, to the music of the French can-can "Galop infernal" from Jacques Offenbach's opera Orpheus in the Underworld. The sequence ended with the masked torchbearer crossing the river on a zip line.

=== Synchronicité ===
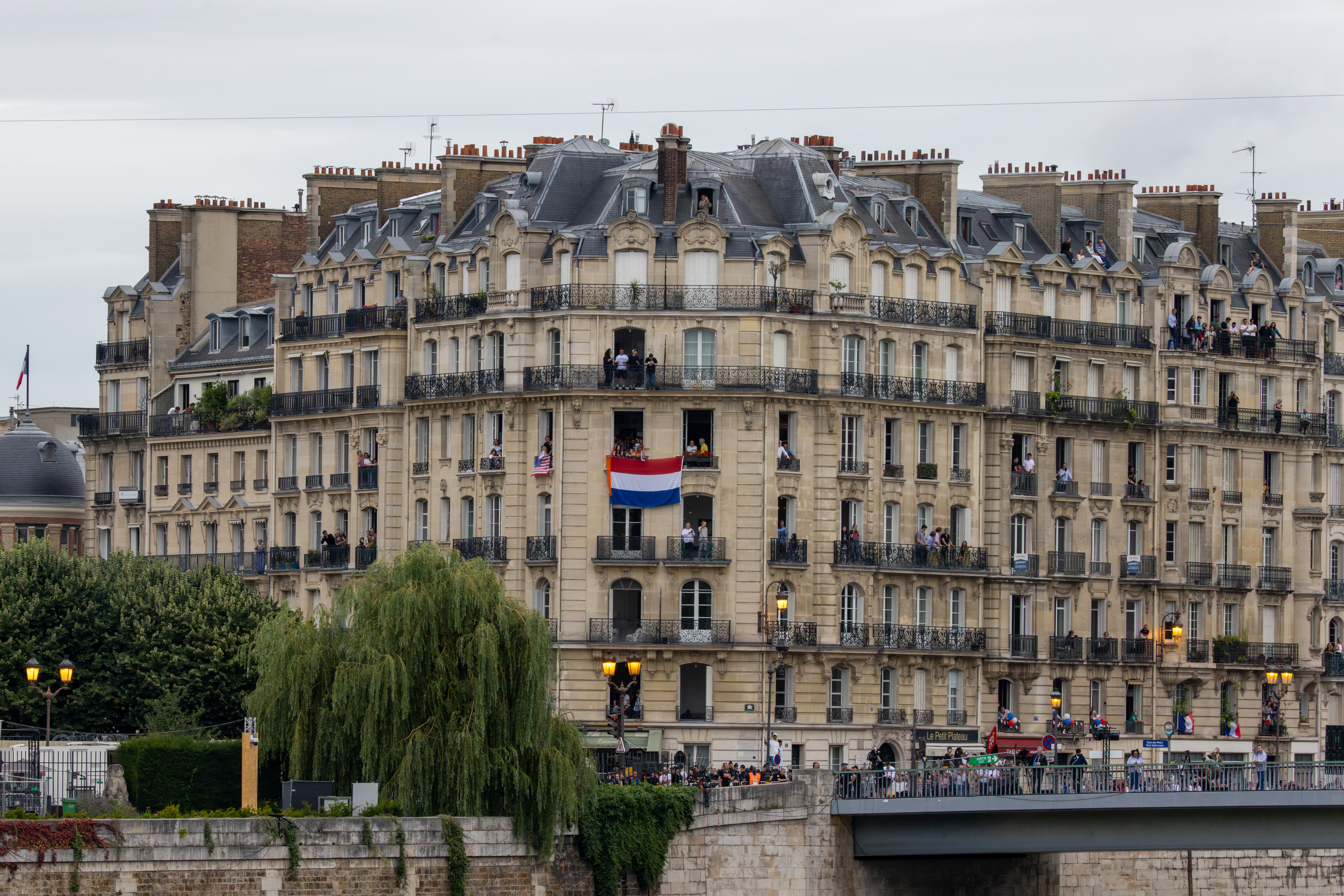
Residents on Île de la Cité, near the Pont Saint-Louis, observe from their homes the Parade of Nations passing into the Synchronicité segment.

The second sequence, Synchronicité (synchronicity), started with a dance tribute by 420 people to the reconstruction teams of Notre-Dame repairing the cathedral following its 2019 fire and to artisans in general, held on Île de la Cité. This sequence featured French-Senegalese dancer Guillaume Diop on the rooftop of the Hôtel de Ville and Olympic champions Martin Fourcade of France and Michael Phelps of the United States. Aside from the Notre-Dame's reconstruction, the sequence also highlighted the making of the Olympic medals in their three metals at the Monnaie de Paris and the Louis Vuitton cases that carry them.

=== Liberté ===
The third sequence, Liberté (liberty), was themed after the French Revolution, the Reign of Terror and their aftermath. In a pre-recorded scene at the Théâtre du Châtelet, the torchbearer witnesses a performance of "A la volonté du peuple" (the original French version of "Do You Hear the People Sing?") by a group of actors playing in the musical Les Misérables with homage to Eugène Delacroix's Liberty Leading the People, which then cuts to live footage of the façade of the Conciergerie. In one of its windows, a beheaded Marie Antoinette (who was imprisoned at the site before eventually being guillotined) sang the opening notes of Ah! ca ira!, joined by heavy metal band Gojira playing enthusiastically, perched on small platforms that stuck out from other windows. Mezzo-soprano Marina Viotti joined Gojira in the latter half of the song, before performing a rendition of the "L'amour est un oiseau rebelle" from Georges Bizet's opera Carmen, all done while "sailing" along the Quai de l'Horloge on a float in the shape of the boat present on the coat of arms of Paris.

Actors Yuming Hey, Léa Luce Busato, and Elan Ben Ali performed a pre-recorded seduction scene at the salle ovale of the Richelieu site of the Bibliothèque nationale de France to French literature titles including: Romances Sans Parole (Romances Without Words) by Paul-Marie Verlaine, 1874; Bel-Ami (Nice Friend) by Guy de Maupassant, 1885; On Ne Badine Pas Avec L'amour (No Trifling with Love) by Alfred de Musset, 1834; Passion Simple (Simple Passion) by Annie Ernaux, 1992; Sexe Et Mensonges (Sex and Lies) by Leila Slimani, 2021; Le Diable Au Corps (The Devil in the Body) by Raymond Radiguet, 1923; Les Liaisons Dangereuses (Dangerous Relationships) by Pierre Choderlos de Laclos, 1782; Les Amants Magnifiques (The Magnificent Lovers) by Molière, 1670; and Le Triomphe De L'amour (The Triumph of Love) by Pierre de Marivaux, 1732. The scene also addressed diverse forms of love (including LGBT themes and polyamory) expressed by acrobats from the XY company, circus artists from the Gratte-Ciel company, and tightrope walker Nathan Paulin, performing live at the Pont Neuf. The sequence ended with a red heart drawn in the sky with trails of colored smoke by planes of the Patrouille de France.

=== Égalité ===
The Republican Guard marching band played the introduction of "For me formidable" by Charles Aznavour on the Pont des Arts footbridge, opening the fourth sequence, Égalité (equality). During the band's performance, the masked torchbearer turned up and used the Olympic flame to light up the stage for French singer Aya Nakamura, who performed a mashup of three songs: "Pookie", "Djadja" and some stanzas from "For me formidable", in front of the Institut de France in a special brass version with the Choir of the French Army and musicians of the Republican Guard.

=== Fraternité ===
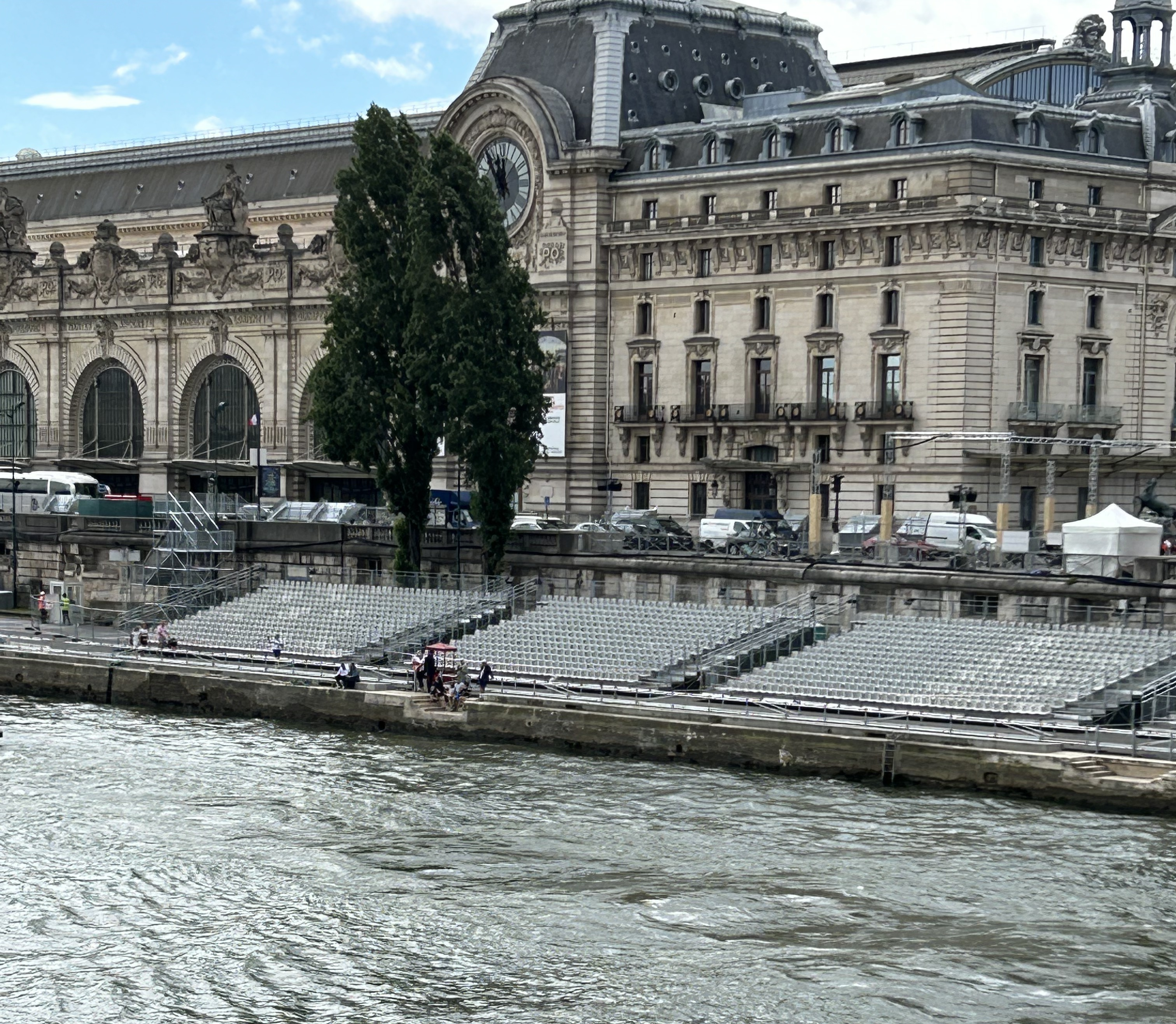
Bleachers in front of the Musée d'Orsay

The fifth sequence, Fraternité (fraternity/brotherhood), began with Camille Saint-Saëns' "Danse macabre" and the masked torchbearer at the Louvre seeing characters from the paintings and the statues emerging and coming to life, reminiscent of the Night at the Museum films, and finding Leonardo da Vinci's Mona Lisa absent, stolen from its protective chamber (a reference to its theft in 1911). The parade resumed through the section of the river decorated with giant board heads of the characters from the paintings facing behind the parade with the Cypriot through Gabonese delegations, as pianist Alexandre Kantorow performed Maurice Ravel's "Jeux d'eau" above Passerelle Léopold-Sédar-Senghor under heavy rain. The parade boats continued with the Gambian through Jamaican delegations.

The ceremony moved to the Musée d'Orsay and paid homage to French filmmakers the Lumière brothers and Georges Méliès, alongside French children's literature, such as The Little Prince, as well as French contributions to aviation, while the Paul Dukas tone poem The Sorcerer's Apprentice, (most famously featured in Walt Disney's Fantasia), played. After that, the International Space Station (in whose program the European Space Agency is a participant) appears, revealing a yellow periscope which pans down to an animated underwater sequence by Illumination Studios Paris featuring the Minions from Illumination's Despicable Me franchise, holding various sports events from the Olympics in a submarine reminiscent of Jules Verne's Nautilus from Twenty Thousand Leagues Under The Sea, as well as revealing themselves to be the ones responsible for stealing the Mona Lisa earlier, which emerged from the Seine after their usual mayhem causes the sub to explode. Mezzo-soprano Axelle Saint-Cirel, representing the national personification of the French Marianne, then sang the French national anthem in a French flag-themed Dior dress atop the Grand Palais.

=== Sororité ===
The sixth sequence, Sororité (sorority/sisterhood), highlighted nine notable French women with golden statues along the Seine: Olympe de Gouges, Alice Milliat, Gisèle Halimi, Paulette Nardal, Jeanne Barret, Christine de Pizan, Louise Michel, Alice Guy, and Simone Veil. A tenth statue, of Simone de Beauvoir, was supposed to be included, but did not rise during the ceremony due to technical problems. After that, Saint-Cirel sang the sixth verse of the French national anthem, accompanied by a choir.

=== Sportivité ===
The seventh sequence, Sportivité (sportsmanship), resumed the parade boats with the Japanese through Norwegian delegations. Athletes demonstrated urban sports, namely skateboarding and BMX freestyle, as well as breakdancing on floating ramps near Port du Gros-Caillou. Polish countertenor Jakub Józef Orliński dressed as a Pierrot who sang Viens Hymen from Jean-Philippe Rameau's opera Les Indes galantes, becoming the first artist from Poland to perform at an Olympic Games opening ceremony. Orliński then performed some breakdancing in a nod to the sport's inclusion at the Games. Rapper Rim'K followed, singing his song "King" near Pont de l'Alma on board what would be the dance barge of the following sequence.

=== Festivité ===
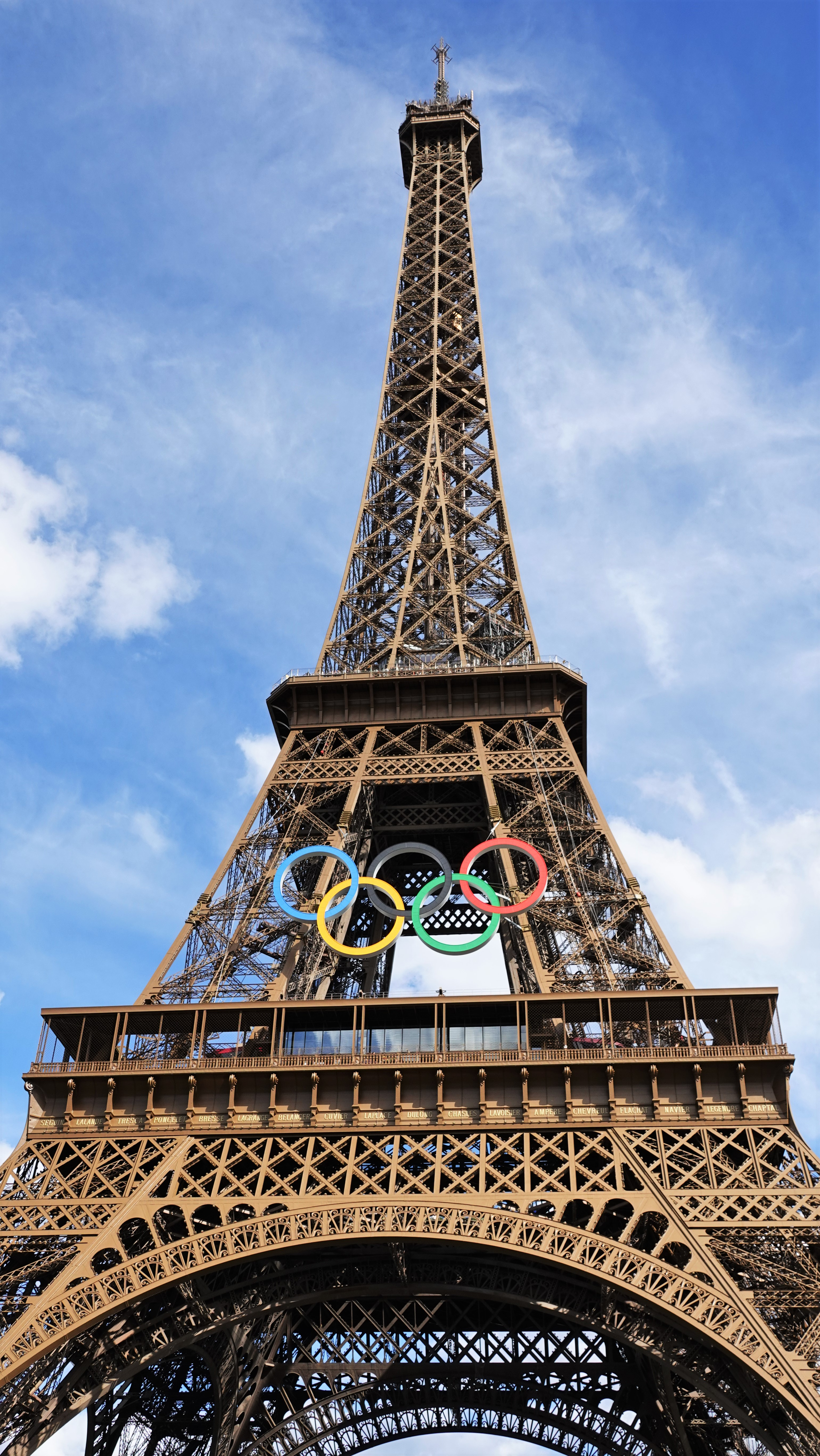
The Olympic rings on the Eiffel Tower

The eighth sequence, Festivité (festivity/celebration), started with a tribute to French fashion at the red carpet on the Passerelle Debilly. The parade continued on to its end with the Kiwi through Zimbabwean delegations, then the Australian and the American delegations as their cities Brisbane and Los Angeles, are the next Summer Olympic Games hosts in 2032 and 2028 respectively. The masked torchbearer walked past the models and performed acrobatics on the Passerelle, after which a live video feed showed the participants of the Olympic surfing tournaments on Tahiti. The parade of boats culminated with the French delegation arriving on a large boat.

A tribute to the European Union was introduced by "The Final Countdown" by Swedish band Europe and a projection show of the 12 stars of the EU flag revolving around the Eiffel Tower, and featured drag queens including Nicky Doll and dancers including Germain Louvet, Electro Street, and the Mazelfreten collective, continuing on the waterlogged red carpet of the Debilly footbridge, as well as a barge with an LED dancefloor, to Eurodance and EDM tracks (see below), and Philippe Katerine seen nearly nude and painted as a blue Dionysus (the Greek god of wine, in tribute to France's wine industry and the ancient Greek Olympics), performed "Nu", lying at the center of a long table, with the drag queens posed in a sort of Bacchanalian feast. Some commentators in the news media noted the pose as a possible allusion to the Jan van Bijlert painting Le Festin des Dieux, and to the relationship between Dionysus and his daughter Sequana, the goddess of the Seine, while others interpreted it as depicting a reimagining of The Last Supper by da Vinci. Katerine's display was also compared to Papa Smurf from the Belgian comic series The Smurfs (one of the popular French-language comics).

The soundtrack of the first eight sequences included rearranged classics of French chanson and pop culture mixed by DJ Barbara Butch:

- Serge Gainsbourg – "Initials B.B."
- Richard Sanderson – "Reality"
- Chagrin d'amour – "Chacun fait (c'qui lui plaît)"
- Dalida – "Monday, Tuesday... Laissez-moi danser"
- Patrick Hernandez – "Born to Be Alive"
- Claude François – "Magnolias for Ever"
- Cerrone – "Give Me Love"
- Les Rita Mitsouko – "Marcia Baila"
- Jacques Offenbach – Orpheus in the Underworld performing the can-can by Moulin Rouge dancers
- Cassius – "I Love U So"
- Erik Satie – "Gymnopédie no 1"
- France Gall and Michel Berger – "Ça balance pas mal à Paris"
- Les Rita Mitsouko – "Andy"
- Diam's – "DJ"
- Bibi Flash – "Histoire d'1 soir"
- Sheila – "Spacer"
- Modjo – "Lady (Hear Me Tonight)"
- Alan Braxe and Fred Falke – "Intro"
- David Guetta – "Love Don't Let Me Go"
- Daniel Balavoine – "L'Aziza"
- Véronique Sanson – "Chanson sur ma drôle de vie"
- Ottawan – "D.I.S.C.O."
- France Gall – "Besoin d'amour"
- Stardust – "Music Sounds Better with You"
- Jupiter and Kassav' – "Kass Limon"
- Claude François – "Alexandrie Alexandra"
- Justice – "D.A.N.C.E."
- IAM – "Je danse le Mia"
- Étienne Daho – "Tombé pour la France"
- Desireless – "Voyage Voyage"
- Niagara – "L'amour à la plage"
- Plastic Bertrand – "Ca plane pour moi"
- DJ Mehdi - "Signatune (Thomas Bangalter Edit)"
- Johnny Hallyday – "Que je t'aime"
- Michel Polnareff – "Lettre à France"
- M83 – "Midnight City"
- Europe – "The Final Countdown"
- Gala – "Freed from Desire"
- Da Hool – "Meet Her at the Love Parade"
- Black Box and Loleatta Holloway – "Ride on Time (79 Disco Anthem)"
- La Bouche – "Be My Lover"
- Nicki Doll - "I Had A Dream"
- Gigi D'Agostino – "Bla Bla Bla"
- Edward Maya and Vika Jigulina – "Stereo Love"
- Darude – "Sandstorm"
- Ice MC – "It's a Rainy Day"
- Mylène Farmer – "Désenchantée"
- Philippe Katerine – "Louxor, j'adore"

=== Obscurité ===
The ninth sequence, Obscurité (obscurity/darkness), continued on from Festivité, with the music turning darker in mood and the dancers aboard the barge becoming more frenetic. As its LED floor flashed a montage of various climate disasters, including droughts, floods, and forest fires, the dancers slowly collapsed, one by one. As the Seine darkened, Juliette Armanet appeared on a raft singing "Imagine" as part of a call for peace, accompanied by Sofiane Pamart on a burning piano. According to the official ceremony media guide, Obscurité was conceived as a reflection on the "evils afflicting the world". The juxtaposition of Imagine with the image of a burning piano adrift on the Seine following scenes of environmental collapse has been interpreted as a representation of the dissonance between symbolic optimism and present-day realities marked by armed conflicts and global warming, while drawing attention to tensions between visions of a sustainable future and the limited capacity of contemporary institutions to address global crises.

=== Solidarité ===
The tenth sequence, Solidarité (solidarity), showcased a hooded knight-resembling horsewoman portrayed by Morgane Suquart representing both the patron saint of France, Joan of Arc, and the goddess of the river Seine, Sequana (and thus Christianity and the Gallo-Roman religion), as well as serving as the secondary main character of the opening ceremony. The horsewoman wore the Olympic flag as a cape along with silver and black armour, and rode a metallic mechanical horse galloping at 25 km/h midstream on the Seine. As she galloped, she spread dove wings above the Seine, an ancient symbol of peace between nations during the Olympic truce. Once the mechanical horse completed its course on the Seine, the horsewoman, now portrayed by Floriane Issert, showed up riding a live, white horse on land, crossing the pont d'Iena. This segment referenced Pierre de Coubertin and the history of the Olympics, with numerous archival images and footage showing iconic highlights of the past Games. Volunteers carrying the flags of the participating countries gathered on the Pont d'Iéna. The horsewoman climbed off the white horse and carried another, folded Olympic flag on foot to a mast at the Trocadéro, surrounded by athletes, in front of a Paul Jouve's 1937 sculpture titled “Bull’s head and leaping deer", sculpted at the Trocadéro. The Olympic Hymn was performed by the Radio France Choir featuring the Maîtrise de Radio France and the Orchestre National de France in Greek as members of the French Armed Forces raised the flag, which was accidentally raised upside down.

The 1.80-meter metal horse was designed and built by Atelier Blam, a Nantes design studio founded by Aurélien Meyer. The rider's costume, designed by Jeanne Friot and Robert Mercier, was upcycled leather armor.

=== Solennité ===
During the eleventh sequence, Solennité (solemnity), the Olympic Laurels were awarded, with Italian diplomat Filippo Grandi receiving them in his capacity as the United Nations High Commissioner for Refugees. Tony Estanguet, head of the organizing committee, and IOC president Thomas Bach welcomed participants and spectators in French and English. President Emmanuel Macron then declared the Games open, stating:

"Je proclame ouverts les Jeux de Paris célébrant la XXXIIIe Olympiade des temps modernes." – "I declare open the Games of Paris, celebrating the XXXIII modern Olympiad."

— President Emmanuel Macron

The Olympic oath was sworn by French flag bearers Mélina Robert-Michon and Florent Manaudou, coach Christophe Massina, and wrestling referee Melanie Tran. The masked torchbearer made their final appearance at the opening ceremony. They gave the Olympic flame back to Zinedine Zidane, who then handed it to Spanish tennis player Rafael Nadal (beginning the final leg). He carried the flame up the Seine by boat along with other Olympic champions Carl Lewis and Serena Williams of the United States and Nadia Comăneci of Romania, while on the Trocadéro stage, Shaheem Sanchez, a deaf dancer, performed Cerrone's "Supernature" in French Sign Language, backdropped by an elaborate light show on the Eiffel Tower, focusing on the Olympic Rings. The boat docked near the Louvre, where tennis champion Amélie Mauresmo continued the relay with basketball player Tony Parker. They were joined by Paralympic champions Nantenin Keïta, Alexis Hanquinquant, and Marie-Amélie Le Fur, officially opening the twelfth and final sequence, Éternité (eternity).

=== Éternité ===
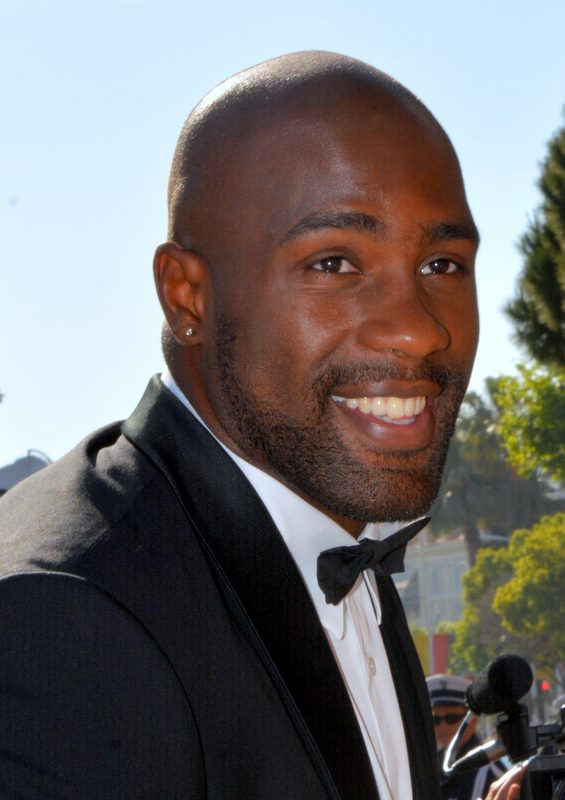
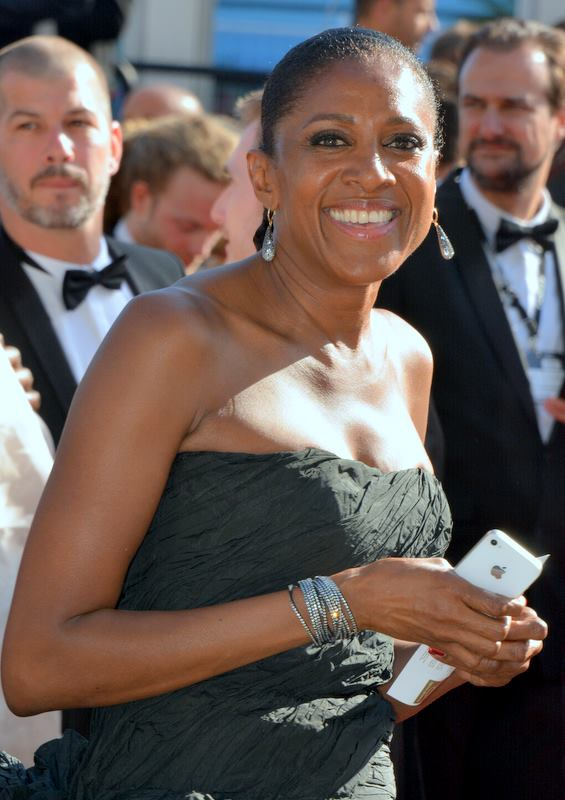
Teddy Riner and Marie-José Pérec lit the cauldron

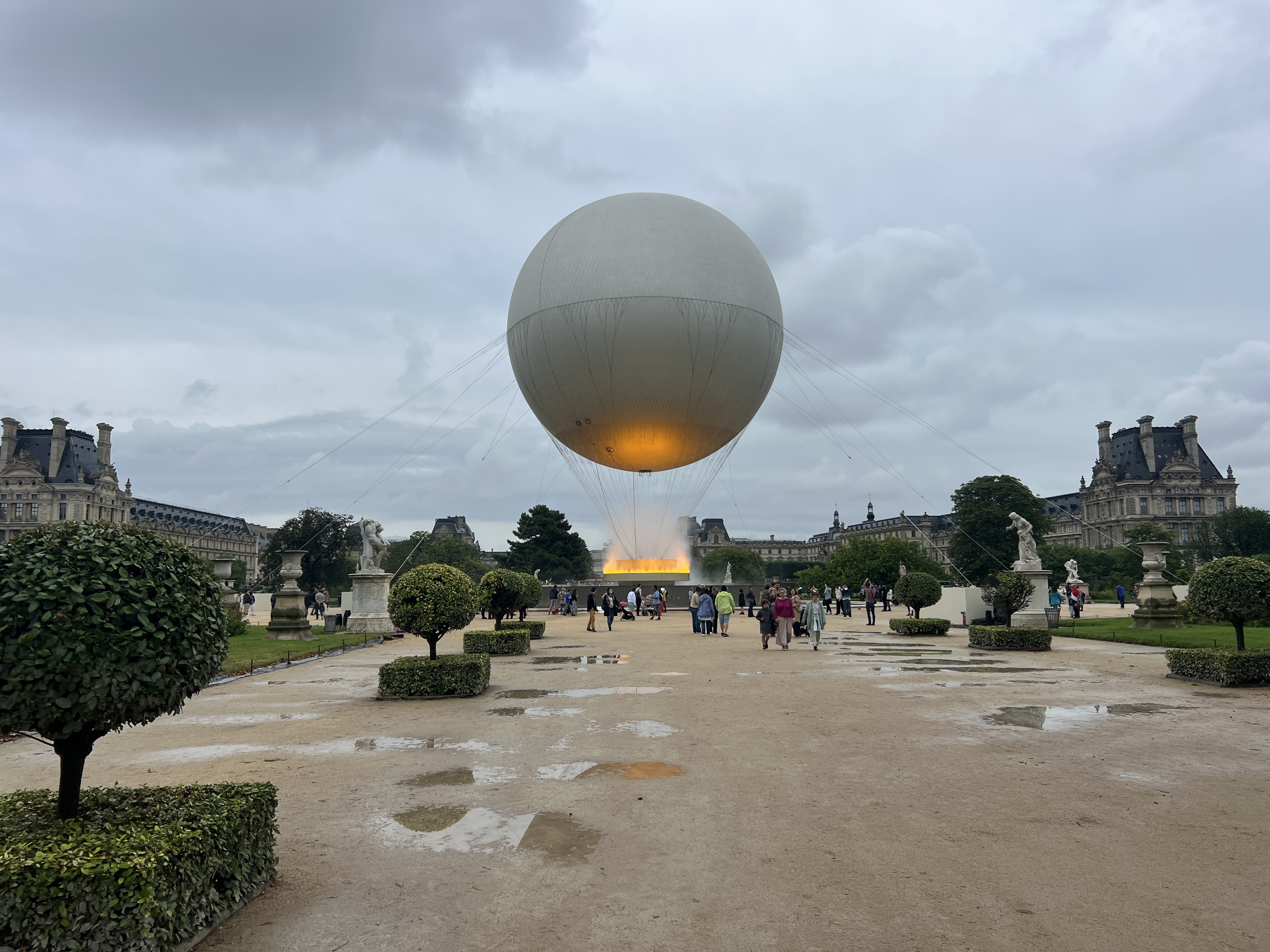
The Olympic cauldron at the Tuileries Garden

The flame was relayed through the Tuileries Garden, where the cauldron would be situated, after entering the Carrousel du Louvre. A number of French Olympic champions carried the torch: Michaël Guigou, Allison Pineau, Jean-François Lamour, Félicia Ballanger, Florian Rousseau, Émilie Le Pennec, David Douillet, Clarisse Agbegnenou, Alain Bernard, Laure Manaudou, Renaud Lavillenie, Laura Flessel and Charles Coste, the oldest living French Olympic champion at 100 years old.

The final leg culminated with Coste lighting the torches of Teddy Riner and Marie-José Pérec, who then lit the Olympic cauldron, a ring of 40 computerized LEDs and 200 high-pressure water aerosol spray dispensers which was topped by a 30-metre-tall helium sphere resembling a hot air balloon, rising in the air, reminiscent of the Montgolfier brothers' experiments leading to the first hot air balloon flight in 1783. The cauldron is attached to a wire-like conduit anchored in the middle of the Grand Bassin Rond (literally, "Large Round Basin") to avoid flying off; the conduit feeds the cauldron with water and electricity, and is pulled back to the ground during daytime. It is the first Olympic cauldron to light up without the direct use of fossil fuels. The actual flame, meanwhile, was stored in a lantern nearby.

=== Epilogue ===
Canadian singer Céline Dion, accompanied by pianist and musical director Scott Price, concluded the ceremony by singing Édith Piaf's "Hymne à l'amour" from the first floor of the Eiffel Tower, bringing the ceremony to a close at 23:29 CEST.

== Music performances ==
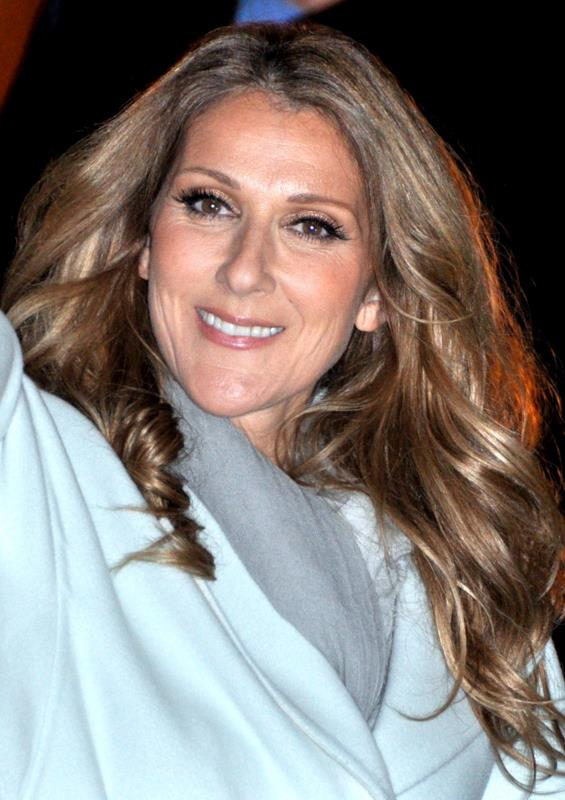
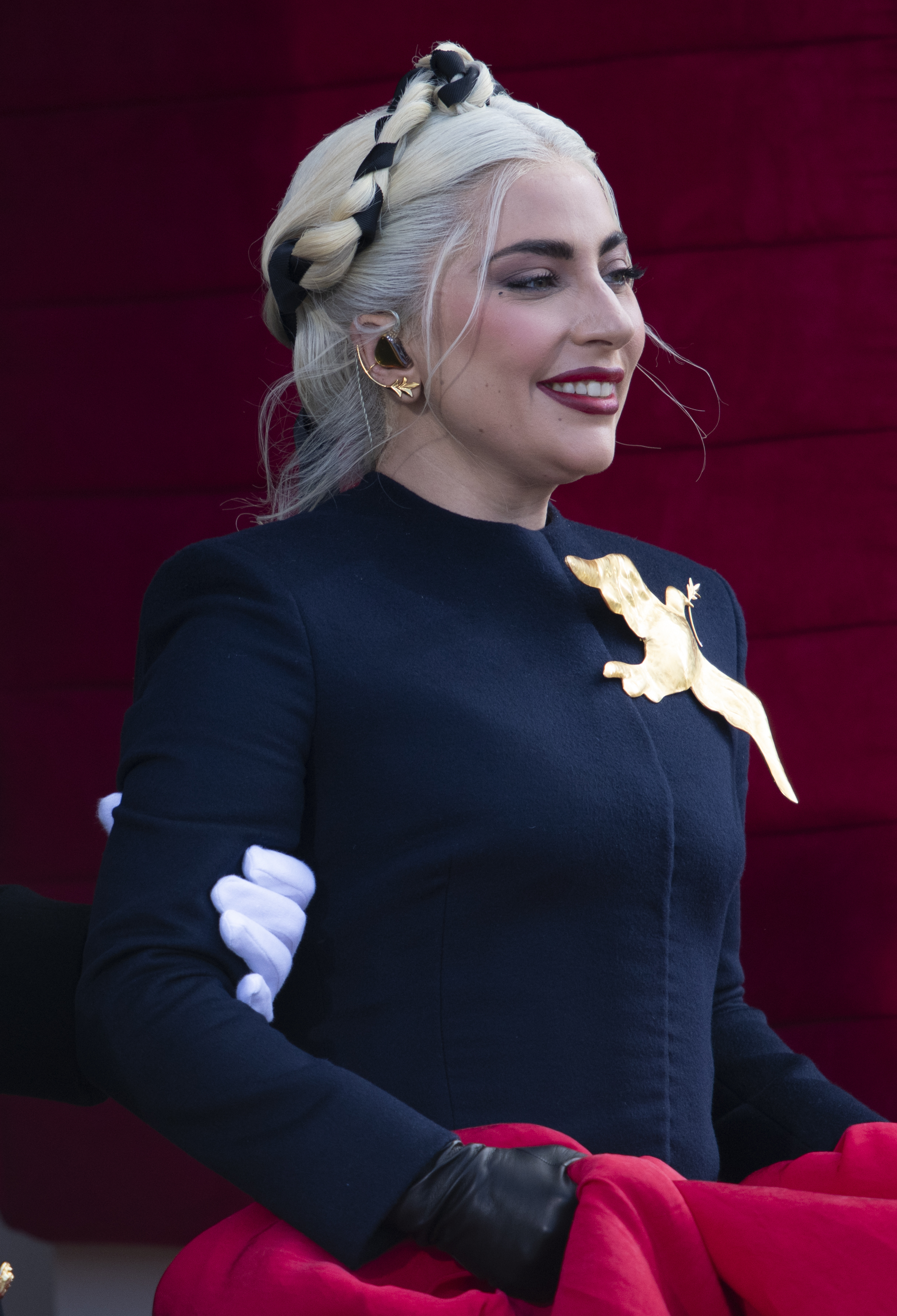
Céline Dion and Lady Gaga (pictured in 2012 and 2021)

French singer Slimane performed his song "Mon Amour" at a pre-opening ceremony event in Saint-Denis which was broadcast on France 2. As Slimane had cancelled a concert the day prior, some media outlets were unsure whether he would perform.

American singer Lady Gaga was the first performer of the ceremony, performing a rendition of the song "Mon truc en plumes". Even though her appearance had not been in the embargoed media guide distributed previous to the event, her participation had been heavily speculated due to her multiple appearances in Paris in the days before the ceremony. Progressive metal act Gojira soon followed, becoming the first metal band to perform at an Olympic opening ceremony. The band, who were joined by opera singer Marina Viotti, performed the French Revolution-era song "Ça Ira" at the Conciergerie, a former prison where Marie Antoinette spent her final days. A performer portraying a beheaded Antoinette began the performance. Aya Nakamura soon followed with a performance of her songs "Pookie" and "Djadja" and "For me formidable" of Charles Aznavour on the Pont des Arts.

Later in the night, as part of a fashion runway portion of the ceremony, various drag queens, including Nicky Doll and alumnae of the reality television series Drag Race France, recreated a bacchanalian feast. Nicky Doll also performed "I Had a Dream" on the runway. Shortly after, musician Philippe Katerine performed while covered in blue body paint and surrounded by fruit and flowers. While Katerine was depicting the Greek god Dionysus, some viewed him as similar to Belgian comic character Papa Smurf from the popular comic book franchise by Peyo, The Smurfs. Juliette Armanet sang John Lennon's 1971 song "Imagine" while accompanied by Sofiane Pamart on piano, which was ablaze during the performance.

Closing the opening ceremony after the Olympic flame was lit, Canadian singer Céline Dion sang the Édith Piaf song "Hymne à l'amour" on the first level of the Eiffel Tower. The performance was her first since December 2022, after revealing her diagnosis with stiff person syndrome.

== Ceremony key team ==
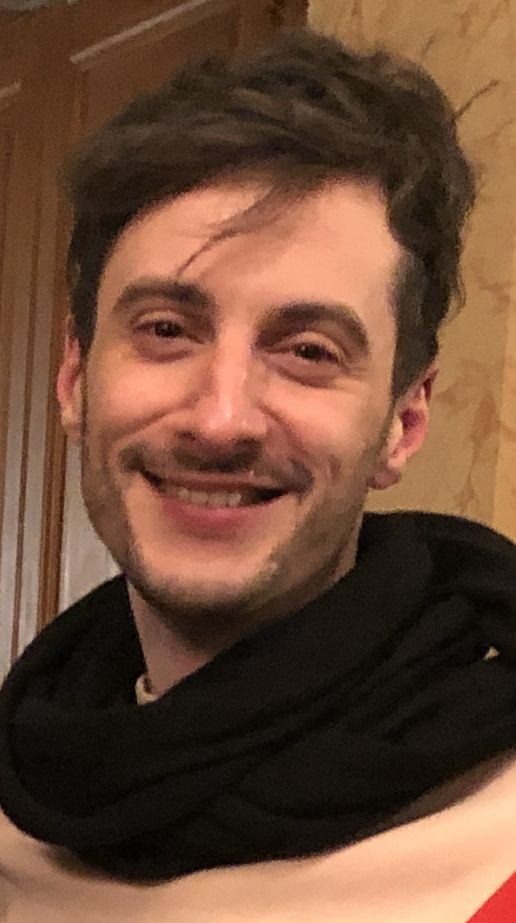
Thomas Jolly, artistic director of the opening ceremony

- Artistic director: Thomas Jolly
- Music director: Victor Le Masne
- Director of Dance: Maud Le Pladec
- Choreographer: Maud Le Pladec
- Styling and Costume director: Daphné Bürki
- Head Costume Master: Olivier Bériot
- Scriptwriters:
  - Patrick Boucheron
  - Damien Gabriac
  - Fanny Herrero
  - Leïla Slimani

== TV coverage ==
The opening ceremony was filmed by host broadcaster Olympic Broadcasting Services (OBS), with OBS distributing a "world feed" for rights-holding broadcasters to use. Over 120 cameras were used, with four camera boats fitted with specialised stabilisation equipment, seven drones and three helicopters. The television production of the ceremony was directed by Simon Staffurth, who previously directed the Rio, Tokyo and Beijing opening ceremonies. Following the ceremony, Jolly criticised OBS, stating they "missed a lot of moments”.

== Dignitaries in attendance ==
=== Host nation ===
- President Emmanuel Macron
  - Former president François Hollande
- First Lady Brigitte Macron
- Prime Minister Gabriel Attal
- COJOP2024 President Tony Estanguet
- Mayor of Paris Anne Hidalgo
- President of CNOSF and UCI David Lappartient

=== International Olympic Committee ===
Members of the International Olympic Committee and the Olympic movement, not counting foreign representatives:

- Thomas Bach, President of the International Olympic Committee
- Andrew Parsons, President of the International Paralympic Committee
- Gianni Infantino, President of FIFA

=== Foreign leaders and representatives ===
The local organizing committee had expected around 120 world leaders would attend the ceremony, next to around 160 ministers. In another report, the French government said that at least one hundred heads of state and government had accepted the invitation to the Games, but did not disclose any other details.

According to a list from the Elysée, three hundred foreign dignitaries from 130 countries and organizations, including 85 heads of state and government, were at Paris for the ceremony. President Macron and IOC president Bach hosted a reception and a Sports for Sustainable Development Summit with visiting dignitaries.

- Edi Rama, Prime Minister of Albania and Linda Rama
- Xavier Espot Zamora, Prime Minister of Andorra
- Javier Milei, President of Argentina and his sister, Karina Milei
- Vahagn Khachaturyan, President of Armenia
- Anika Wells, Minister for Sports of Australia (representing King Charles III and Governor General Sam Mostyn, host country of the 2032 Summer Olympics)
- Karl Nehammer, Chancellor of Austria
- King Philippe and Queen Mathilde of Belgium
- Alexander De Croo, Prime Minister of Belgium and Annik Penders
- Prince Jigyel Ugyen Wangchuck of Bhutan (representing King Jigme Khesar Namgyel Wangchuck) (Note: As member of the IOC)
- Denis Bećirović, Chairman of the Presidency of Bosnia and Herzegovina and First Lady Mirela Bećirović
- Rosângela Lula da Silva, First Lady of Brazil (representing President Luiz Inácio Lula da Silva)
  - André Fufuca, Minister of Sports of Brazil
- Rumen Radev, President of Bulgaria and First Lady Desislava Radeva
- José Maria Neves, President of Cape Verde
- Paul Biya, President of Cameroon and First Lady Chantal Biya
- Carla Qualtrough, Minister of Sport and Physical Activity of Canada (representing King Charles III and Governor General Mary Simon)
- Faustin-Archange Touadéra, President of the Central African Republic
- Jaime Pizarro, Minister of Sports of Chile (representing President Gabriel Boric)
- Han Zheng, Vice President of China (representing President Xi Jinping, host country of the 2022 Winter Olympics)
- Gustavo Petro, President of Colombia and First Lady Verónica Alcocer
- Tom Marsters, President of the Cook Islands
- Azali Assoumani, President of the Comoros and First Lady Ambari Assoumani
- Kolinda Grabar-Kitarović, former president of Croatia
- Andrej Plenković, Prime Minister of Croatia
- Nikos Christodoulides, President of Cyprus and First Lady Philippa Karsera
- Petr Fiala, Prime Minister of the Czech Republic and Jana Fialová
- King Frederik X and Queen Mary of Denmark
- Ismaïl Omar Guelleh, President of Djibouti
- Alar Karis, President of Estonia and First Lady Sirje Karis
- Wiliame Katonivere, President of Fiji and First Lady Filomena Dikumete-Katonivere
- Alexander Stubb, President of Finland and First Lady Suzanne Innes-Stubb
- Brice Oligui Nguema, Transitional President of Gabon
- Salome Zourabichvili, President of Georgia and her daughter, Kéthévane Zourabichvili
- Irakli Kobakhidze, Prime Minister of Georgia
- Olaf Scholz, Chancellor of Germany and Britta Ernst
- Kyriakos Mitsotakis, Prime Minister of Greece and Mareva Grabowski-Mitsotakis
- Bah Oury, Prime Minister of Guinea
- Umaro Sissoco Embaló, President of Guinea-Bissau
- Smith Augustin, Transitional President of Haiti
- Kevin Yeung, Secretary for Culture, Sports and Tourism of Hong Kong
- Tamás Sulyok, President of Hungary and First Lady Zsuzsanna Nagy
- Bjarni Benediktsson, Prime Minister of Iceland
- Prabowo Subianto, Minister of Defense and President-elect of Indonesia (representing President Joko Widodo)
  - Erick Thohir, Minister of State Owned Enterprises and Chair of the Football Association of Indonesia
- Abdul Latif Rashid, President of Iraq
  - Nechirvan Barzani, President of the Iraqi Kurdistan region
- Simon Harris, Taoiseach of Ireland and Caoimhe Wade
- Isaac Herzog, President of Israel and First Lady Michal Herzog
- Sergio Mattarella, President of Italy (host country of the 2026 Winter Olympics)
- Robert Beugré Mambé, Prime Minister of Ivory Coast
- Yuko Kishida, spouse of the prime minister of Japan (representing Emperor Naruhito and Prime Minister Fumio Kishida)
- Prince Faisal bin Hussein of Jordan (representing King Abdullah)
- Vjosa Osmani, President of Kosovo
- Albin Kurti, Prime Minister of Kosovo
- Sadyr Japarov, President of Kyrgyzstan
- Edgars Rinkēvičs, President of Latvia
- Najib Mikati, Prime Minister of Lebanon
- Mohamed al-Menfi, Chairman of the Presidential Council of Libya
- Princess Nora of Liechtenstein
- Daniel Risch, Prime Minister of Liechtenstein
- Gitanas Nausėda, President of Lithuania and First Lady Diana Nausėdienė
- Henri, Grand Duke of Luxembourg and Maria Teresa, Grand Duchess of Luxembourg
- Luc Frieden, Prime Minister of Luxembourg
- Andry Rajoelina, President of Madagascar
- Hussain Mohamed Latheef, Vice President of Maldives
- Robert Abela, Prime Minister of Malta
- Mohamed Ould Ghazouani, President of Mauritania
  - Ahmed Ould Sid'Ahmed Ould Djé, Minister of Culture, Youth, Sports and Relations with Parliament of Mauritania
- Jesús María Tarriba, First Gentleman-designate of Mexico (representing President-elect Claudia Sheinbaum)
- Maia Sandu, President of Moldova
- Albert II, Sovereign Prince of Monaco and Charlene, Princess of Monaco
- Ukhnaagiin Khürelsükh, President of Mongolia
- Jakov Milatović, President of Montenegro
- Milojko Spajić, Prime Minister of Montenegro
- Aziz Akhannouch, Prime Minister of Morocco (representing King Mohammed VI)
- King Willem-Alexander and Queen Máxima of the Netherlands
  - Catharina-Amalia, Princess of Orange
  - Princess Alexia of the Netherlands
- Dick Schoof, Prime Minister of the Netherlands
- Dame Cindy Kiro, Governor-General of New Zealand (representing King Charles III)
- Abdoulaye Mohamadou, Minister of Youth and Sports of Niger
- John Owan Enoh, Minister of Sports Development of Nigeria
- Basil bin Ahmed al Rawas, Undersecretary of the Ministry of Culture, Sports and Youth of Oman (representing Sultan Haitham bin Tariq)
- Santiago Peña, President of Paraguay
- Andrzej Duda, President of Poland
- Marcelo Rebelo de Sousa, President of Portugal
- Emir Tamim bin Hamad Al Thani of Qatar
- Klaus Iohannis, President of Romania
- Paul Kagame, President of Rwanda
- Alessandro Rossi and Milena Gasperoni, Captains Regent of San Marino
- Patrice Trovoada, Prime Minister of São Tomé and Príncipe
- Princess Reema bint Bandar Al Saud of Saudi Arabia
- Bassirou Diomaye Faye, President of Senegal
- Aleksandar Vučić, President of Serbia
- Julius Maada Bio, President of Sierra Leone
- Tharman Shanmugaratnam, President of Singapore
- Peter Pellegrini, President of Slovakia
- Nataša Pirc Musar, President of Slovenia
- Robert Golob, Prime Minister of Slovenia
- Gayton McKenzie, Minister of Sports, Arts and Culture of South Africa (representing President Cyril Ramaphosa)
- King Felipe VI and Queen Letizia of Spain
- Viola Amherd, President of Switzerland
- Sermsak Pongpanit, Minister of Tourism and Sports of Thailand (representing King Maha Vajiralongkorn)
- Matviy Bidnyi, Temporary Acting Minister of Youth and Sports of Ukraine (representing President Volodymyr Zelenskyy)
- Keir Starmer, Prime Minister of the United Kingdom (representing King Charles III)
- Jill Biden, First Lady of the United States (representing President Joe Biden)
  - Karen Bass, Mayor of Los Angeles (host city of the 2028 Summer Olympics)
  - Jennifer Siebel Newsom, First Partner of California, (representing Governor Gavin Newsom of California, state of the 2028 Summer Olympics host city)
- Nguyễn Văn Hùng, Minister of Culture, Sports and Tourism of Vietnam (representing President Tô Lâm)
- Constantino Chiwenga, Vice President of Zimbabwe

=== International organizations ===
The following dignitaries from international organizations were in attendance:

- Moussa Faki. Chairperson of the African Union Commission
- Charles Michel, President of the European Council
- Margaritis Schinas, Vice President of the European Commission
- Christine Lagarde, President of the European Central Bank
- Louise Mushikiwabo, Secretary General of the Francophonie
- Mathias Cormann, Secretary General of the OECD
- Audrey Azoulay, Director-General of UNESCO
- António Guterres, Secretary-General of the United Nations
- Tedros Adhanom Ghebreyesus. Director General of the WHO

== Reception ==
The ceremony received mixed reviews, with most of its criticism directed towards its length and format, weather conditions, technical issues, and other aspects of the production itself, but with praise for its musical performances, themes of inclusivity, and its final acts (including the cauldron lighting and Céline Dion's closing performance). 86% of French residents surveyed by the organizing committee considered the opening ceremony to have been "successful".

Among France's newspapers of record, Le Monde considered it a "dream-like spectacle" that showcased a country that was "inclusive" and "unafraid of controversy", while Libération described it as "imbued with inclusivity and self-deprecation", and hailed a "catharsis that was all the more welcome" after the stress of France's snap elections and "sublimated by the rain that turned into an artistic asset". The conservative Le Figaro described it as "a grandiose and sumptuous spectacle", but demonstrating that France "[can't] help drawing from its revolutionary guts the spirit of provocation and discord that has always fueled its paradoxes and divisions". French right-wing newspapers and commentators were less impressed, and called it 'woke propaganda'.

Writing for Time magazine, Judy Berman felt that the ceremony was "occasionally weird, wildly ambitious, ultimately wonderful, and extremely French", and remarked that "the most enjoyable moments tended to be the strangest—and the most idiosyncratically French—ones. Dozens of dancers in hot pink doing the can-can? Fantastique. Marie Antoinette holding her freshly severed, singing head, as the introduction to a set piece that would pair opera singer Marina Viotti with French metal stalwarts Gojira? Vive la révolution." Arifa Akbar of The Guardian described the ceremony as being "like a motley outfit thrown together. Water cannons, street dancers in Louis XIV outfits, and ultra-camp fashion shows which seemed like a crime against haute couture: it would not have looked out of place at Cannes' gaudy la Croisette." However, Akbar felt that the final act and cauldron lighting was more "dignified", and that "the ceremony could have done with so much more of this class."

New York Times television critic Mike Hale considered the ceremony to be "quintessentially French: titillating, hermetic, light on humor and heavy on pretense", and praised the cauldron lighting and finale, but felt that the boat parade made the NBC telecast feel like a "bloated made-for-TV spectacle" akin to an awards show or holiday parade in comparison to past opening ceremonies. The New Statesman compared the artistic segments to the Eurovision Song Contest, believing that the BBC's telecast needed a commentator such as Graham Norton "who could make sense of it all, or at least dryly mock that which they could not." The inclusion of the Minions of the Despicable Me film franchise (characters who were created and voiced by the film's French director Pierre Coffin) were considered by U.S. critics as cross-promotion by the Olympics' local rights holder NBCUniversal (whose American studio Universal Pictures distributes the films), with Aramide Tinubu of Variety describing the scene as "both odd and off-putting".

=== Viewership ===
According to Médiamétrie ratings, the opening ceremony was seen in France by an average of 23.2 million viewers, and peaking at 25.2 million, making it among the country's 10 most-watched television broadcasts of all time behind the 2022 FIFA World Cup final (24.08 million). In the United States, NBC Sports reported that the opening ceremony was seen by 28.6 million viewers across its live broadcast and prime time encore, its highest viewership for any Olympic opening ceremony since 2014. In Canada, the CBC also reported ratings improvements over Tokyo 2020, with 13.3 million viewing all or part of the broadcast across CBC Television and its sub-license partners.

== Controversies and incidents ==
=== Drag queen segment ===
The Festivité segment contained a scene of drag queens and other dancers (such as child krump dancer, Adeline Cruz), arranged in a row along a catwalk. A statement from Paris 2024 said that it was inspired by Leonardo da Vinci's fresco The Last Supper (housed in Santa Maria delle Grazie in Milan, one of the host cities of the 2026 Winter Olympics), which depicts Jesus and the Twelve Apostles.

The segment was criticized by some Christian groups. The Roman Catholic Bishops' Conference of France considered it a "derision and mockery of Christianity." The Holy See "deplore[d] the offence" caused to Christians. The Russian Orthodox Church criticized the opening ceremony. The ecumenical organization the World Council of Churches asked for an explanation from the IOC and described Christians as being "angered." Festivité was also criticized by the Muslim institution Al-Azhar Al-Sharif for depicting Jesus in an "offensive manner." Secular criticism of the segment also came, from such figures as Turkish president Recep Tayyip Erdoğan, opposition United States presidential candidate Donald Trump, and Slovak deputy prime minister Tomáš Taraba, the last of whom described the ceremony as "deviant decadence." Left-wing French opposition figure Jean-Luc Mélenchon also joined the denunciation of the sequence.

In response to the criticism, the Paris 2024 producers stated that director Thomas Jolly "took inspiration from Leonardo da Vinci's famous painting to create the setting", and argued that the painting had already been frequently parodied in popular culture. In a 28 July interview with BFM TV, Jolly denied having been inspired by The Last Supper, stating that his actual intent "was to do a big pagan party linked to the gods of Olympus." That same day, the Games' organizers issued an apology, stating, "Clearly, there was never an intention to show disrespect to any religious group." Barbara Butch, the DJ featured in that scene, subsequently filed a legal complaint after what she described as "an extremely violent campaign of cyber-harassment and defamation" directed toward her after the ceremony. Similar complaints had also been filed by Jolly, Nicky Doll, the choreographer, the producers, and the organizers. French president Macron condemned the harassment, and also defended the ceremony as a whole, stating that it had "made our compatriots extremely proud."

The Olympic World Library later published the media guide (written before the ceremony) which mentioned it being a homage to cultural festivities. According to Georgian fact checking website, Myth Detector, many experts had pointed out the differences between the fresco and the segment.

=== Marie Antoinette scene ===
The Liberté section included a portrayal of Marie Antoinette, in which the queen was shown holding her own severed head in reference to her execution by guillotine in 1793 during the French Revolution; the sequence was also held in the Conciergerie, where she was imprisoned, tried and sentenced. The segment was criticized for its grotesque nature and for glorifying violence in the Reign of Terror. Critics included French right-wing figures, including Jean-Christophe Buisson, a biographer of Marie Antoinette; French monarchists; members of the House of Habsburg-Lorraine, to which Marie Antoinette belonged; members of the House of Bourbon, into which she married; and even far-left French opposition figure Jean-Luc Mélenchon. The segment was contrasted with the London 2012 opening ceremony, in which the inclusion of Queen Elizabeth II was perceived to be an "homage" to the British monarchy.

Thomas Jolly, the director of the ceremony, stated that there was no "glorification of this instrument of death that was the guillotine" and that "If we use our work to regenerate [...] division, hatred [...] and it continues to progress, when I believe we have made some peace [...], then that would be great pity."

=== Presence of Aya Nakamura ===
The presence of singer Aya Nakamura at the ceremony was criticized in France. Nakamura had faced racial abuse in the lead up to the event, such as the far-right group Les Natifs displaying a banner "There's no way Aya. This is Paris, not the Bamako market" on the basis of her roots in Mali. According to an Odoxa poll prior to the event, 63% of French people disapproved of Nakamura performing at the Olympics.

=== Introduction of South Korea as North Korea ===
During the parade of nations, the South Korean delegation was incorrectly addressed by the French and English announcers as République populaire démocratique de Corée and Democratic People's Republic of Korea – the official designation for North Korea – rather than République de Corée and Republic of Korea. The International Olympic Committee posted an apology on their official website.

Jang Mi-ran, Second Vice Minister of Culture, Sports and Tourism, stated that it would submit an official protest over the accident, and that it had "asked the foreign ministry to lodge a strong complaint with France on a government level", asked the IOC to arrange a meeting with President Bach regarding this incident, and asked the Paris organizing committee to ensure that this would not reoccur.

== Awards ==
Year	Award	Recipient(s)	Work
2025	Grammy Award for Best Metal Performance	Gojira, Marina Viotti & Victor Le Masne	"Mea Culpa (Ah! Ça ira!)"
2025	Victoire de la musique for musical performance, tour or concert		Opening and closing ceremonies of the Summer Olympic and Paralympic Games in 2024

== See also ==
- 2024 Summer Olympics
- 2024 France railway arson attacks
- Concerns and controversies at the 2024 Summer Olympics
- 2009 East Asian Games opening ceremony, held on a floating stage set up at Victoria Harbour
- 2010 Asian Games opening ceremony, held on Haixinsha Island at Guangzhou
- 2018 Summer Youth Olympics, whose opening ceremony took place at the Obelisco de Buenos Aires.
