= Barbara Butch =

French DJ and LGBT+ activist (born 1981)

- Born: Leslie Barbara Butch; 17 March 1981 (age 45); Paris, île-de-France, France
- Genres: French house; electro house; disco house; nu-disco; indie; electro-funk; boogie; synthpop; Jewish hip hop
- Occupations: Activist; musician; DJ
- Years active: 2004–present

Barbara Butch (born 17 March 1981) is a French disc jockey and lesbian activist. She campaigns for fat acceptance and has made the short film Extra Large. She was awarded the Out d'or 2021 "personnalité LGBTI de l'année" ("LGBTI personality of the year") by the French Association of LGBTI Journalists. In 2024, she was featured in the 2024 Summer Olympics opening ceremony, which was criticized as controversial due to the mockery of Christianity.

== Early life ==
Barbara Butch was born on 17 March 1981 at the Marie-Louise Clinic in the 9th arrondissement of Paris, where her mother, grandmother and great-grandmother were born before her. Her mother, a secretary of Ashkenazi Jewish descent and her father a house painter, was of Sephardic Jewish descent from Morocco Heidi, and she grew up in a traditional Jewish family. She grew up in the 7th arrondissement of Paris, studied music theory, piano, Brazilian percussion and guitar in her teens, and created her own mixtapes and recorded cassettes. The Eclaireuses et Eclaireurs israélites de France (Jewish Guides and Scouts of France) was a key part of her life during those years. Later, she started going to Pulp, a leading Parisian club hosting lesbian parties.

== Career ==
Butch started to build her DJ career playing in bars in Montpellier, initially using the DJ name "Scratcheuse de gazon" before reverting to her actual name. In 2008 she moved back to Paris, working at Rosa Bonheur and then other club venues such as the Machine du Moulin Rouge.

On 5 February 2020 she posed naked on the cover of Télérama with the question: ‘Pourquoi on rejette les gros? (Why do we reject fat people?). This led to her becoming the face of Jean Paul Gaultier's perfume La Belle Intense.

In 2023, Butch was a guest celebrity judge in a Season 2 episode of the French language reality television series Drag Race France (titled "The Musidrag"), broadcast on France.tv Slash.

In 2024, Butch carried the Paralympic Torch.

== Controversy ==
On 26 July 2024, she performed at the Festivité section of the opening ceremony of the Olympic Games, mixing French variété classics in a set featuring actors from the drag queen scene. A statement from Paris 2024 said that it was inspired by Leonardo da Vinci's fresco The Last Supper, which depicts Jesus and the Twelve Apostles, while Thomas Jolly and the Olympic Games' X account stated that this represented an interpretation of the Greek deity Dionysus. Art experts at Musée Magnin say that the tableau was inspired by The Feast of the Gods by Jan van Bijlert. Due to that interpretation, the World Council of Churches responded that Christians around the world were angered, with the act being deemed blasphemous by the Catholic Church. Butch received a number of online threats after the performance, and stated through her lawyer that she would be filing legal complaints in response.

The Olympic World Library later published a media guide (written before the ceremony) which mentioned it being a homage to cultural festivities. One Georgian fact checking website, Myth Detector alleged there were differences between the fresco and the segment.
