= Patrick Boucheron =

French historian (born 1965)

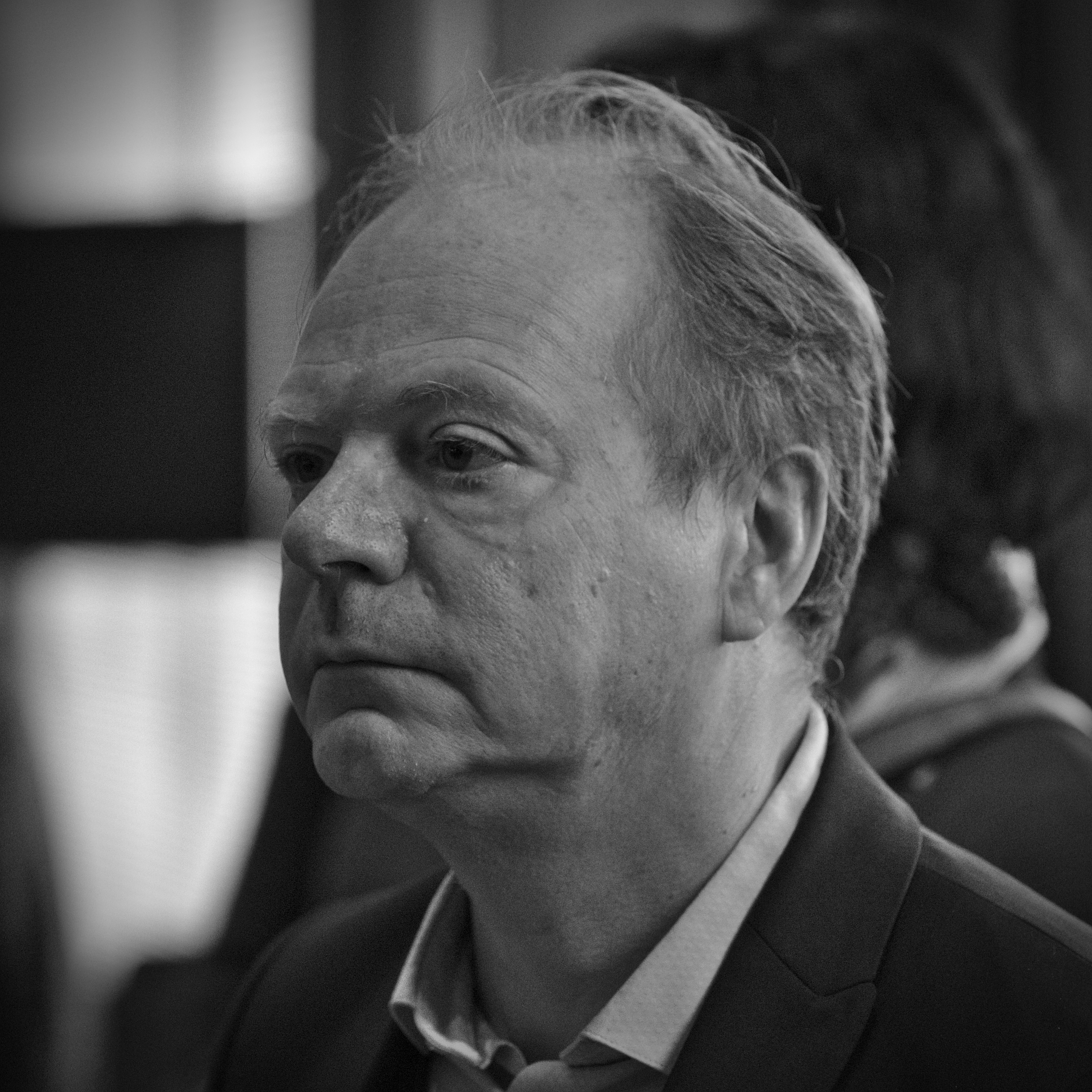
- Patrick Boucheron in 2016
- Born: 28 October 1965 (age 60); Paris, France
- Education: Lycée Marcelin Berthelot; Lycée Henri IV
- Alma mater: École normale supérieure de lettres et sciences humaines
- Occupation: Historian
- Employer: Collège de France

Patrick Boucheron (born 28 October 1965) is a French historian. He previously taught medieval history at the École normale supérieure and the University of Paris. He is a professor of history at the Collège de France. He is the author of 12 books and the editor of 5 books. His 2017 book, Histoire mondiale de la France (Global History of France), compiled work by 122 historians and became an unexpected bestseller, with more than 110 000 copies sold. From 2017 to 2020, he hosted Quand l'histoire fait dates, a TV program of 22 episodes which explored different important dates in world history.

== Early life ==
Patrick Boucheron was born in 1965 in Paris.

Boucheron was educated at the Lycée Marcelin Berthelot in Saint-Maur-des-Fossés and the Lycée Henri IV in Paris. He graduated from the École normale supérieure de lettres et sciences humaines (ENS) in Saint-Cloud and earned the agrégation in history in 1988. He earned a PhD in history from the University of Paris in 1994. His thesis supervisor was Pierre Toubert.

== Career ==
Boucheron was an assistant professor in medieval history at his alma mater, the ENS, from 1994 to 1999. He was associate professor of history at the University of Paris from 1999 to 2012, and full professor from 2012 to 2016. He has been a professor of history at the Collège de France since 2016.

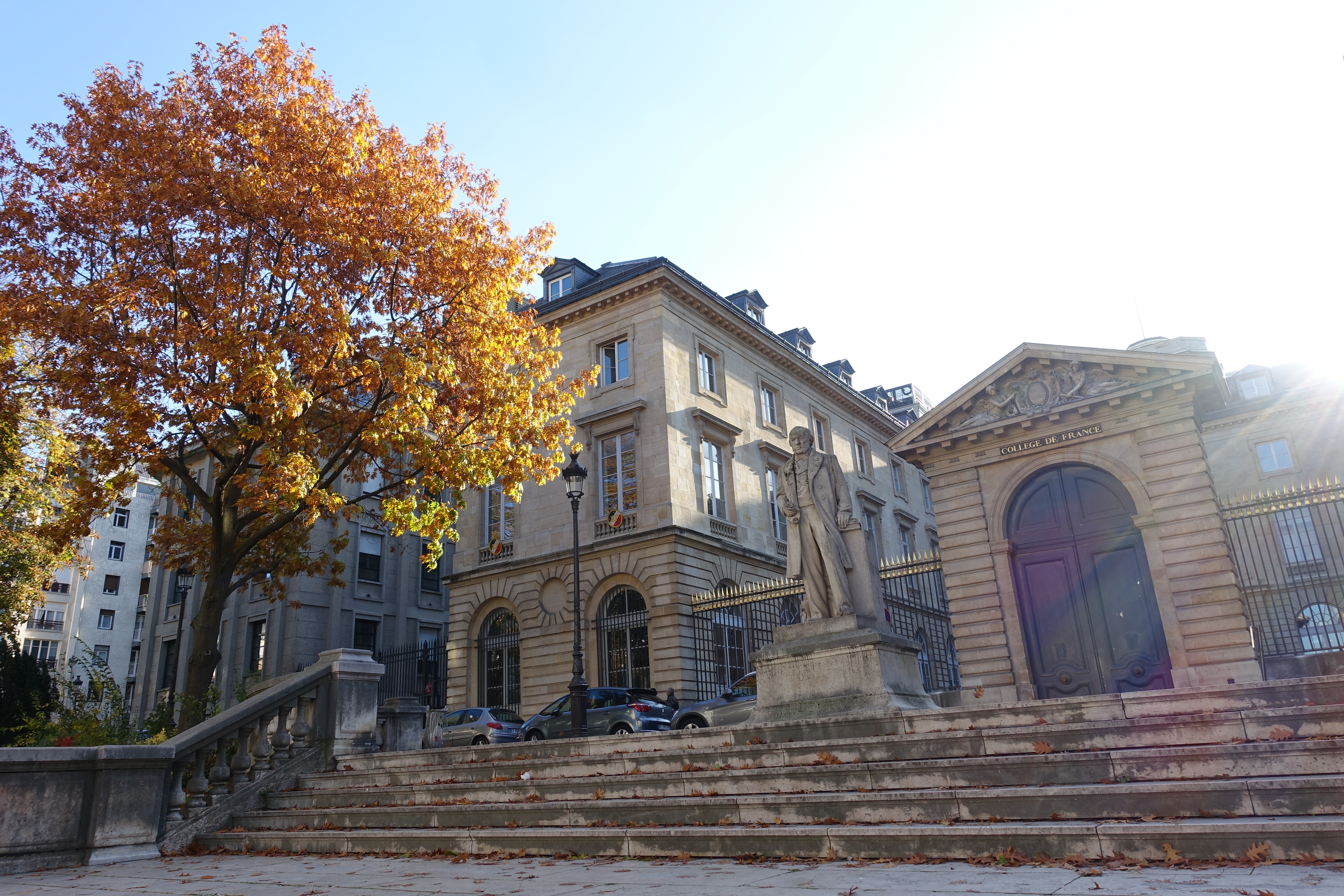
The Collège de France, where Boucheron teaches history.

Boucheron has served on the editorial board of L'Histoire since 1999. He was also a junior member of the Institut Universitaire de France from 2004 to 2009. He has been the chairman of the advisory board of the École française de Rome since 2005. He is on the editorial board of the L'Univers Historique collection of the Éditions du Seuil, a French publisher, and he is a contributor to France Culture, a French radio station. He regularly attends the Banquet du livre, an annual book festival in Lagrasse.

Boucheron is the author or co-author of 12 books and or the editor or co-editor of 5 books. His first book, Le pouvoir de bâtir : urbanisme et politique édilitaire à Milan (XIVe-XVe siècles), was his PhD thesis. Out of the many books he edited, Le mot qui tue. Une histoire des violences intellectuelles de l'Antiquité à nos jours, is about the use of words to wound others. His inaugural address before the Collège de France, Ce que peut l’histoire, was published as a book in 2016.

In 2017, Boucheron edited Histoire mondiale de la France (Global History of France), co-written by 122 historians. The book presents an account of French history from an international perspective; for example, it includes the 1973 Chilean coup d'état as part of French history. The book's release coincided with the 2017 French presidential election, although it is not explicitly political. Histoire mondiale de la France became a best-seller, and was positively reviewed by left-leaning outlets such as Le Monde and Libération, while being attacked by right-leaning outlets and conservative intellectuals. It was dismissed by Éric Zemmour, who described it as "historically incorrect". François-Xavier Bellamy criticised the book for not defining France within its borders and sovereign prerogative. Alain Finkielkraut criticized it for not mentioning French literature.

Boucheron was a co-writer for the 2024 Summer Olympics Opening Ceremony.

In 2025 he intervened publicly pushing for the censorship of the collective work Face à l’obscurantisme woke, the initial publication of which was planned for April 2025 at PUF.

== Works in English ==
- Boucheron, Patrick, ed. (2019). France in the World. A New Global History. New York: Other Press. ISBN 9781590519417.
- Boucheron, Patrick (2020). Machiavelli. The Man Who Taught the People What They Have to Fear. New York: Other Press. ISBN 9781590519523.

== Works ==
- Boucheron, Patrick (1998). Le pouvoir de bâtir : urbanisme et politique édilitaire à Milan (XIVe-XVe siècles). Rome: Ecole française de Rome. ISBN 9782728305247. OCLC 470439360.
- Boucheron, Patrick; Chiffoleau, Jacques, eds. (2004). Les palais dans la ville : espaces urbains et lieux de la puissance publique dans la Méditerranée médiévale. Lyon: Presses universitaires de Lyon. ISBN 9782729707477. OCLC 419499802.
- Boucheron, Patrick, ed. (2009). Histoire du monde au XVe siècle. Paris: Fayard. ISBN 9782213635491. OCLC 878718887.
- Boucheron, Patrick (2004). Les villes d'Italie : vers 1150-vers 1340. Paris: Belin. ISBN 9782701139753. OCLC 56681985.
- Boucheron, Patrick (2010). Faire profession d'historien. Paris: Publications de la Sorbonne. ISBN 9782859446550. OCLC 671465753.
- Boucheron, Patrick; Offenstadt, Nicolas, eds. (2011). L'espace public au Moyen Âge : débats autour de Jürgen Habermas. Paris: Presses Universitaires de France. ISBN 9782130573579.
- Boucheron, Patrick; Menjot, Denis (2011). Pinol, Jean-Luc (ed.). La ville médiévale. Paris: Éditions du Seuil. ISBN 9782757825471. OCLC 930805151.
- Boucheron, Patrick (2012). L'entretemps : conversations sur l'histoire. Lagrasse: Verdier. ISBN 9782864326724. OCLC 796230072.
- Boucheron, Patrick; Venayre, Sylvain (2012). L'histoire au conditionnel : textes et documents à l'usage de l'étudiant. Paris: Mille et une nuits. ISBN 9782755506914. OCLC 852117722.
- Boucheron, Patrick (2013). Léonard et Machiavel. Lagrasse: Éditions Verdier. ISBN 9782864327417. OCLC 898491736.
- Azoulay, Vincent; Boucheron, Patrick, eds. (2013). Le mot qui tue : une histoire des violences intellectuelles de l'Antiquité à nos jours. Seyssel: Editions Champ Vallon. ISBN 9782876735040. OCLC 966061315.
- Boucheron, Patrick (2013). Conjurer la peur : Sienne, 1338 : essai sur la force politique des images. Paris: Editions du Seuil. ISBN 9782021134995.
- Boucheron, Patrick; Delalande, Nicolas (2013). Pour une histoire-monde. Paris: Presses Universitaires de France. ISBN 9782130620655. OCLC 842467414.
- Boucheron, Patrick (2014). De l'éloquence architecturale : Milan, Mantoue, Urbino (1450 - 1520). Paris: Éditions B2. ISBN 9782365090377. OCLC 904458008.
- Boucheron, Patrick; Riboulet, Mathieu (2015). Prendre dates : Paris, 6 janvier - 14 janvier 2015. Lagrasse: Verdier. ISBN 9782864328001. OCLC 914280522.
- Boucheron, Patrick (2016). Ce que peut l'histoire. Paris: Fayard. ISBN 9782213701264. OCLC 951175589.
- Boucheron, Patrick (2016). Comment se révolter. Montrouge: Bayard. ISBN 9782227489240. OCLC 961342251.
- Boucheron, Patrick, ed. (2017). Histoire mondiale de la France. Paris: Seuil. ISBN 9782021336290. OCLC 973193003.
- Boucheron, Patrick (2026). Peste noire. Paris: Seuil. p. 576. ISBN 2021548392.
