= L (French singer) =

French singer-songwriter

- Birth name: Raphaële Lannadère
- Born: February 23, 1981 (age 44)
- Genres: Chanson française
- Labels: Tôt ou tard
- Website: l-raphaelelannadere.com

L is the stage name of Raphaële Lannadère, a French singer-songwriter, born February 23, 1981.

== Biography ==
When very young, L sang and gave small concerts for her family.

When she was close to 20 years old, with the help of an ethnomusicologist, she studied Gypsy, Corsican, and Bulgarian polyphonic music, as well as gospel and fado, which would affect her music and singing style.

In 2002, she chose a stage name, L, her initial, and gave her first concert in the basement of a Parisian restaurant, accompanied by the future Babx (David Babin.) Many concerts followed where she performed classics of French song such as Piaf, Ferré, Brel and Barbara, and during which she refined her writing. She also sang with the Brazilians Ricardo Tete and Teofilo Chantre. Her 6-track EP was released in 2008, and broadcast on FIP, France Inter and Europe 1.

In 2010, she was invited to the Découvertes du Printemps de Bourges and to the Chantier des Francos. She wrote for Camelia Jordana.

Her first album, Initiale, was released in April 2011.

She received the Barbara prize in 2011, as well as the Grand Prix du Disque for French Song.

== Discography ==
- Premières Lettres (6 tracks), Karbaoui Rec / Sounds (2008)
- Initiale, Tôt ou tard (2011)
- L., Tôt ou tard (2015)
- Chansons, Tôt ou tard (2018)
