= Forum Opéra (disambiguation) =

== Music ==
- Forum Opéra, founded in 1999, mainly known for its website, Forumopera.com, is a French-speaking webzine which is dedicated to opera and bel canto
- Forum Opéra, founded in 1987, also known as “association des amis de l'opéra de Lausanne” (AAOL), is a Swiss operatic association that promotes opera and bel canto within the French-speaking part of western Switzerland.
