= Auphan =

Auphan is a surname. Notable people with the surname include:

- Gabriel Auphan (1894–1982), French admiral and politician
- Renée Auphan (born 1941), Franco-Swiss singer and director of opera
