= Sophie Junker =

Franco-Belgian opera singer

Sophie Junker (born 1985) is a Belgian operatic soprano, focused on Baroque music, especially works by Handel.

== Life and career ==
Junker, born in 1985, was first trained by her father, Stéphan Junker, a voice teacher at the Verviers conservatoire. She then studied voice in Namur at the IMEP (Institut supérieur de Musique et de Pédagogie) and at the Guildhall School of Music and Drama in London.

She achieved international recognition when she won the Handel Competition in London in 2010. In 2012 she won the international Cesti Competition of the Innsbruck Festival of Early Music.

== Roles ==
- 2012: Amor in Gluck's Orfeo ed Euridice at the Angers-Nantes Opéra
- 2012: Israelite Woman in Handel's Esther at the Göttingen International Handel Festival
- 2013: Galatea in Handel's Acis and Galatea at the Royal Opera of Versailles
- 2013: Belinda in Purcell's Dido and Aeneas at the Innsbruck Festival of Early Music
- 2013: Wanda in Offenbach's La Grande-Duchesse de Gerolstein at the Opéra Royal de Wallonie, Liège
- 2013: Italian Woman in Charpentier's Médée at the English National Opera
- 2014: Caio in Vivaldi's Ottone in villa at the Copenhagen Opera Festival
- 2015: Melanto in Monteverdi's Il ritorno d’Ulisse in patria at the Enescu Festival in Bucharest
- 2015: Drusilla in Monteverdi's L’incoronazione di Poppea, Enescu Festival
- 2015: Anna Reich in Nicolai's Die lustigen Weiber von Windsor, Opéra Royal de Wallonie
- 2015: Venus in Purcell's King Arthur, Festival de Beaune
- 2015: Hélène in Chabrier's Une éducation manquée, Lafayette Opera, Washington, D.C.
- 2015: title role of Viardot's Cendrillon, Opéra Royal de Wallonie, Liège
- 2015: Phoebe in Rameau's Castor et Pollux, Saint John's Smith Square
- 2016: Aspasia in Handel's Alexander Balus, London Festival
- 2016: Cleis in Jean-Paul-Égide Martini's Sapho, Opera Lafayette, New York City and Washington, D.C.
- 2016: second Woman in Purcell's Dido and Aeneas, Opéra de Lausanne
- 2017: Proserpine and Eurydike in Charpentier's La descente d'Orphée aux enfers, Wigmore Hall, Den Haag
- 2017: First Lady in Mozart's Die Zauberflöte, Opéra de Limoges
- 2018: Cunegonda in Vinci's Gismondo, re di Polonia, Theater an der Wien
- 2018: Elisetta in Cimarosa'a Il matrimonio segreto, Opéra Royal de Wallonie, Liège
- 2018: Drusilla in Monteverdi's L'incoronazione di Poppea, Staatsoper Berlin
- 2019: Venus in Giovanni Legrenzi 's La divisione del mondo, Opéra national du Rhin in Strasbourg, Nancy and Versailles Opéra
- 2019: Pergolesi's Stabat Mater and François Couperin's Leçons de ténèbres, in concert at the Versailles Opéra
- 2019: title role of Georg Caspar Schürmann's Die getreue Alceste, Schlosstheater Schwetzingen
- 2019: Sigismondo in Handel's Arminio, Göttingen Festival
- 2019: Amarilli in Handel's Il pastor fido, Gliwice and Handel Festival, Halle
- 2021: Angelica in Vivaldi's Orlando furioso, La Seine Musicale
- 2021: Asteria in Handel's Tamerlano, Moscow
- 2022: Cleopatre in Handel's Giulio Cesare in Egitto, touring in the Netherlands, Göttingen Festival

== Recordings ==
- 2012: Bach: Secular Cantatas vol. 2, with Bach Collegium Japan, cond: Masaaki Suzuki, BIS
- 2014: Sacrifices (Filia in Carissimi's Jephte with La Nuova Musica, Harmonia Mundi
- 2016: Handel's Esther with Laurence Cummings, Accent
- 2016: Grétry's L’épreuve villageoise, Naxos
- 2017: Stravaganza d'amore with Pygmalion, cond. Raphaël Pichon, Harmonia Mundi
- 2020: La Francesina", Handel's Nightingale", Le Concert de l'Hostel Dieu, cond. Franck-Emmanuel Comte

== Awards ==
- 2010 First prize London Handel Competition
- 2012 First prize international competition for Baroque opera Innsbruck Cesti Competition
- 2020: Choc de Classica for La Francesina
- 2020: Diamant from Opéra Magazine for La Francesina
- 2020: Forum Opéra trophy in the category best album of the year for La Francesina
- 2021: Best Baroque vocal album of the year of International Classical Music Awards (ICMA) for La Francesina
