= Ça Ira =

French revolutionary song

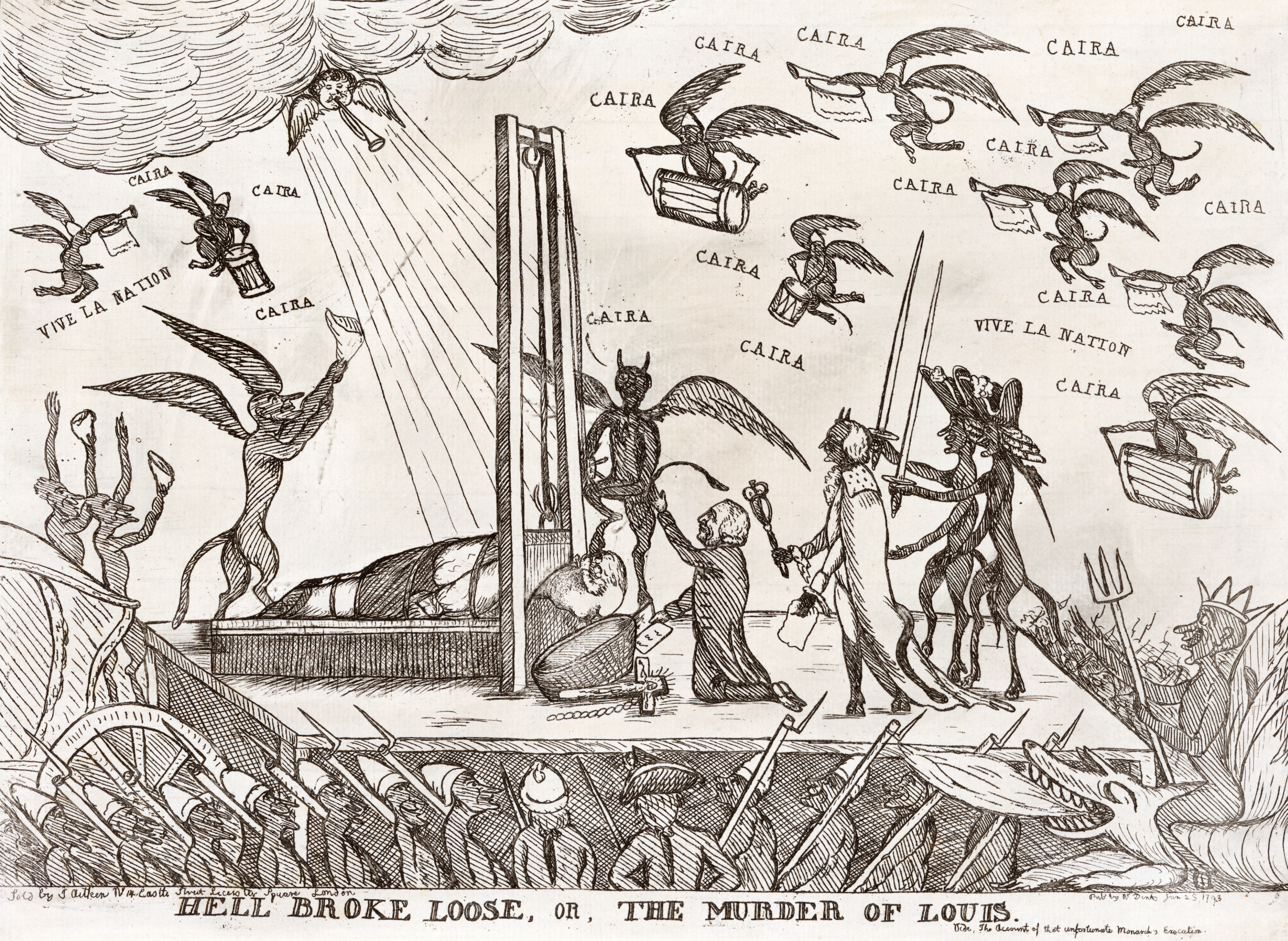
A British political cartoon on the execution of Louis XVI. Published just four days after the execution, it depicts demons singing "Ça ira" at the event.

"Ça ira" ([sa i.ʁa]; French for "It'll be fine") is an emblematic song of the French Revolution, first heard in May 1790. It underwent several changes in wording, all of which used the title words as part of the refrain.

== Original version ==
The original words "Ah! ça ira, ça ira, ça ira" were written by Ladré, a former soldier who made a living as a street singer.

The music is a popular contredanse air called "Le carillon national", and was composed by Jean-Antoine Bécourt, a violinist (according to other sources: side drum player) of the Théâtre Beaujolais. Queen Marie Antoinette herself is said to have often played the music on her harpsichord.

The title and theme of the refrain were inspired by Benjamin Franklin, who was very popular among the French people following his stay as a representative of the Continental Congress from 1776 to 1785. When asked about the American Revolutionary War, he would reportedly reply, in somewhat broken French, "Ça ira, ça ira" ("It'll be fine, it'll be fine").

The song first became popular as a worksong during the preparation for the Fête de la Fédération of 1790 and eventually became recognized as an unofficial anthem of revolutionaries.

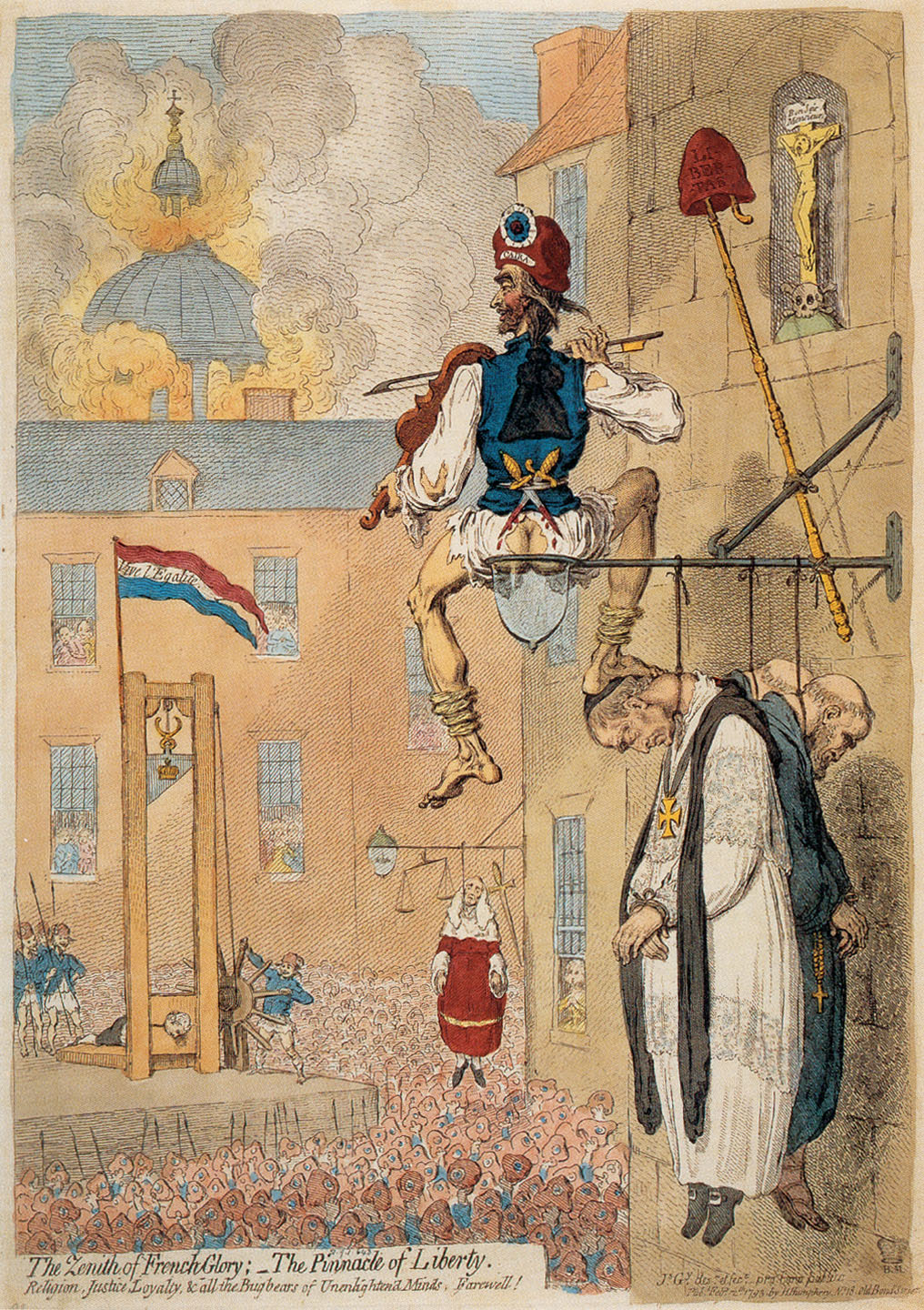
Political cartoon by James Gillray; "Ça ira" is written on the hat of the musician.

Ah! ça ira, ça ira, ça ira
Le peuple en ce jour sans cesse répète,
Ah! ça ira, ça ira, ça ira
Malgré les mutins tout réussira!

Nos ennemis confus en restent là
Et nous allons chanter «Alléluia!»
Ah! ça ira, ça ira, ça ira
Quand Boileau jadis du clergé parla
Comme un prophète il a prédit cela.
En chantant ma chansonnette
Avec plaisir on dira:
Ah! ça ira, ça ira, ça ira.

Suivant les maximes de l'évangile
Du législateur tout s'accomplira.
Celui qui s'élève on l'abaissera
Celui qui s'abaisse on l'élèvera.
Le vrai catéchisme nous instruira
Et l'affreux fanatisme s'éteindra.
Pour être à la loi docile
Tout Français s'exercera.
Ah! ça ira, ça ira, ça ira.

Pierrette et Margot chantent la guinguette
Réjouissons-nous, le bon temps viendra!
Le peuple français jadis à quia,
L'aristocrate dit: «Mea culpa!»
Le clergé regrette le bien qu'il a,
Par justice, la nation l'aura.
Par le prudent Lafayette,
Tout le monde s'apaisera.

Ah! ça ira, ça ira, ça ira
Par les flambeaux de l'auguste assemblée,
Ah! ça ira, ça ira, ça ira
Le peuple armé toujours se gardera.
Le vrai d'avec le faux l'on connaîtra,
Le citoyen pour le bien soutiendra.

Ah! ça ira, ça ira, ça ira
Quand l'aristocrate protestera,
Le bon citoyen au nez lui rira,
Sans avoir l'âme troublée,
Toujours le plus fort sera.

Petits comme grands sont soldats dans l'âme,
Pendant la guerre aucun ne trahira.
Avec cœur tout bon Français combattra,
S'il voit du louche, hardiment parlera.
Lafayette dit: «Vienne qui voudra!»
Sans craindre ni feu, ni flamme,
Le Français toujours vaincra!

Ah! It'll be fine, It'll be fine, It'll be fine
The people on this day repeat over and over,
Ah! It'll be fine, It'll be fine, It'll be fine
In spite of the mutineers everything shall succeed.

Our enemies, confounded, stay petrified
And we shall sing "Hallelujah"
Ah! It'll be fine, It'll be fine, It'll be fine
When Boileau spoke of the clergy
Like a prophet he predicted this.
By singing my little song
With pleasure, people shall say,
Ah! It'll be fine, It'll be fine, It'll be fine.

According to the precepts of the Gospel
Of the lawmaker everything shall be accomplished
He who exalts himself shall be humbled
He who is humble shall be exalted
The true catechism shall instruct us
And the awful fanaticism shall be snuffed out.
At being obedient to Law
Every Frenchman shall train
Ah! It'll be fine, It'll be fine, It'll be fine.

Pierrette and Margot sing the guinguette
Let us rejoice, good times will come!
The French people used to keep silent,
The aristocrat says, "Mea culpa!"
The clergy regrets its wealth,
Through justice, the nation will have it.
Thanks to the careful Lafayette,
Everyone will calm down.

Ah! It'll be fine, It'll be fine, It'll be fine
By the torches of the august assembly,
Ah! It'll be fine, It'll be fine, It'll be fine
An armed people will always take care of themselves.
We'll know right from wrong,
The citizen will support the Good.

Ah! It'll be fine, It'll be fine, It'll be fine
When the aristocrat shall protest,
The good citizen will laugh in his face,
Without troubling his soul,
And will always be the stronger.

Small ones and great ones all have the soul of a soldier,
During war none shall betray.
With heart all good French people will fight,
If he sees something fishy he shall speak with courage.
Lafayette says "come if you will!"
Without fear for fire or flame,
The French always shall win!

== Sans-culotte version ==
At later stages of the revolution, many sans-culottes used several much more aggressive stanzas, calling for the lynching of the nobility and the clergy.

Ah! ça ira, ça ira, ça ira
les aristocrates à la lanterne!
Ah! ça ira, ça ira, ça ira
les aristocrates on les pendra!

Si on n' les pend pas
On les rompra
Si on n' les rompt pas
On les brûlera.
Ah! ça ira, ça ira, ça ira
les aristocrates à la lanterne!
Ah! ça ira, ça ira, ça ira
les aristocrates on les pendra!

Nous n'avions plus ni nobles, ni prêtres,
Ah! ça ira, ça ira, ça ira,
L'égalité partout régnera.
L'esclave autrichien le suivra,
Ah! ça ira, ça ira, ça ira,
Et leur infernale clique
Au diable s'envolera.
Ah! ça ira, ça ira, ça ira
les aristocrates à la lanterne!
Ah! ça ira, ça ira, ça ira
les aristocrates on les pendra!
Et quand on les aura tous pendus
On leur fichera la paille au cul,
Imbibée de pétrole, vive le son, vive le son,
Imbibée de pétrole, vive le son du canon.

Ah! It'll be fine, It'll be fine, It'll be fine
aristocrats to the lamp-post
Ah! It'll be fine, It'll be fine, It'll be fine
the aristocrats, we'll hang them!

If we don't hang them
We'll break them
If we don't break them
We'll burn them
Ah! It'll be fine, It'll be fine, It'll be fine
aristocrats to the lamp-post
Ah! It'll be fine, It'll be fine, It'll be fine
the aristocrats, we'll hang them!

We shall have no more nobles nor priests
Ah! It'll be fine, It'll be fine, It'll be fine
Equality will reign everywhere
The Austrian slave shall follow him
Ah! It'll be fine, It'll be fine, It'll be fine
And their infernal clique
Shall go to the devil
Ah! It'll be fine, It'll be fine, It'll be fine
aristocrats to the lamp-post
Ah! It'll be fine, It'll be fine, It'll be fine
the aristocrats, we'll hang them!
And when we'll have hung them all
We'll stick straw up their arse,
Soaked in oil, long live the sound, long live the sound,
Soaked in oil, long live the sound of the canon.

== Post-revolutionary use ==
The song survived past the Reign of Terror. It was forbidden in 1797 under the Directory.

The ship of the line La Couronne was renamed Ça Ira in 1792 in reference to this song.

At the 1793 Battle of Famars, the 14th Regiment of Foot (infantry), the West Yorkshire Regiment, attacked the French to the music of "Ça ira" (the colonel commenting that he would "beat the French to their own damned tune"). The regiment was later awarded the tune as a battle honour and regimental quick march. It has since been adopted by the Yorkshire Regiment.

Friedrich Witt cited this motif in the finale of his Symphony No. 16 in A major; although the year of its completion is unknown, it is clear that it was written in the 1790s.

Carl Schurz, in volume 1, chapter 14, of his Reminiscences, reported from exile in England that upon Napoleon III's 1851 French coup d'état, "Our French friends shouted and shrieked and gesticulated and hurled opprobrious names at Louis Napoleon and cursed his helpers, and danced the Carmagnole and sang 'Ça ira'."

Russian composer Nikolai Myaskovsky used both "Ça ira" and La Carmagnole in the finale of his 1923 Symphony No. 6 in E-flat minor Revolutionary.

== Modern adaptations ==
An alternative "sans-culotte"-like version was sung by Édith Piaf for the soundtrack of the film Royal Affairs in Versailles (Si Versailles m'était conté) (1954) by Sacha Guitry.

The song is featured in the 1999 television series The Scarlet Pimpernel, starring Richard E. Grant. There the lyrics are sung in English as follows:

Ah ça ira, ça ira, ça ira
Over in France there's a revolution
Ah ça ira, ça ira, ça ira
Watch what you say or you'll lose your head
Ah ça ira, ça ira, ça ira
Pass some time, see an execution!
Ah ça ira, ça ira, ça ira
Une deux trois and you fall down dead
Ah ça ira, ça ira, ça ira
Hear the tale of Marie Antoinette-a!
Ah ça ira, ça ira, ça ira
A bloodier sight you have never seen!

The Edith Piaf version is featured in the opening scenes of Ridley Scott's 2023 film Napoleon.

In an opening scene of the novel What Is to Be Done? by Nikolay Chernyshevsky, the protagonist Vera Pavlovna is shown singing a song with ça ira in the refrain, accompanied by a paraphrase outlining the struggle for a socialist utopian future. The 1875 French translator "A.T." produced a four-stanza version on the basis of the paraphrase, which was reproduced in full by Benjamin Tucker in his translation.

The 2024 Summer Olympics opening ceremony in Paris, France, was titled Ça Ira. As part of the ceremony, heavy metal band Gojira, alongside French-Swiss mezzo-soprano Marina Viotti, played a version of the song. Officially named "Mea Culpa (Ah! Ça ira!)", their performance took place from the windows of the Conciergerie. This rendition of "Ça ira" went on to win the award for Best Metal Performance at the 67th Grammy Awards. They once again performed the song at the 2025 concert Back to the Beginning in Birmingham, England.

== See also ==
- "La Marseillaise"
