= Marina Viotti =

Swiss-French singer (born 1986)

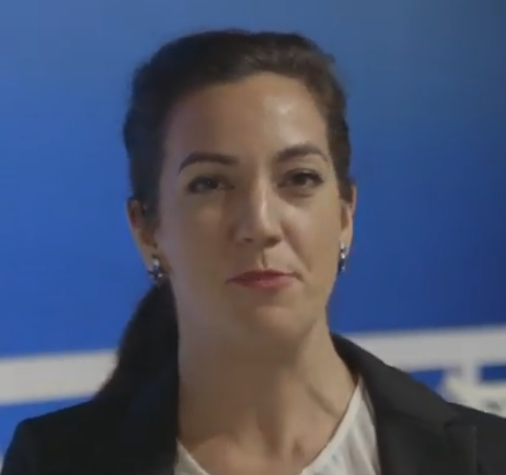
- Viotti in 2017
- Born: 30 April 1986 (age 40); Lausanne, Switzerland
- Occupation: Opera singer

Marina Viotti (born 30 April 1986) is a Swiss-French mezzo-soprano opera singer.

== Early life ==
Marina Viotti was born on 30 April 1986, in Lausanne, in the canton of Vaud, Switzerland. A dual French-Swiss national, she is the daughter of Swiss conductor Marcello Viotti and French violinist Marie-Laurence Geneviève Jacqueline Bret, and the sister of conductor Lorenzo Viotti. She has a younger brother, Alessandro, a horn player at the Lyon Opera in France, and a younger sister, Milena, also a horn player at the Munich Opera in Germany.

Her father's international professional obligations did not prevent her from staying by his side during this time. Viotti saw herself as an opera singer from the age of five because she was already used to listening to singing through her parents' work. She spent her childhood in the Moselle department of Lorraine, France. She lived for about ten years in Petite-Rosselle, where she attended primary and middle school, then Jean-Moulin High School in Forbach. Viotti attended the Forbach Conservatory, where she was trained on the transverse flute. Rather than encouraging her to study opera singing, her parents guided her towards the flute because of the similarity in breathing. Under the direction of Manfred Neuman, she played the transverse flute in the "municipal harmony". She graduated with a diploma in transverse flute in 2000.

Viotti also practised various sports, including horse riding, which she described as "at a fairly high level", as well as football, rugby and volleyball. She said, "my real passion was horse riding", while she continued with music up to the "professional level". As a singer, she explored different musical genres: R'n'B, jazz, variety, and sang gospel in a choir.

=== Lost Legacy and Lyon ===
When she was a teenager, she attended an After Forever concert, led by Floor Jansen, which enchanted her, after being invited by a horn-playing friend from the conservatory who played in a metal band. Viotti described herself as a "punk rocker" around the age of 16. She began playing bass and guitar and, with her horn-player friend, formed Lost Legacy, her first metal band, in which she sang. The band was formed in Forbach. Viotti gave a few concerts with Lost Legacy and rehearsed in the basement of the house her father had soundproofed. The band later released an EP.

Her father died in 2005, which was announced to her during her baccalauréat (bac) blanc, the practice for the final exams. At the age of 18, she left the [Lorraine] bassin houiller. She settled in Lyon, France, with her family. When the family moved to Lyon, she recalled a "rejection of classical music" following her father's death, which had shocked her. Her practice of classical music ceased upon his death.

== Musical career ==
=== Soulmaker and studies ===
After graduating with a baccalauréat Littéraire (L) (lit. 'Literary'), Viotti began a demanding preparatory course for the French grandes écoles at the Lycée du Parc in Lyon. She sported a gothic look, all in black and Doc Martens. She then turned to the study of literature in hypokhâgne and philosophy.

The Belfort-based French metal band Soulmaker, searching for its identity and struggling with vocals, had begun touring in 2002. Viotti joined several bands while she was in Lyon. In 2006, 19-year-old Viotti contacted Soulmaker's members and got them back on track by reorienting them and recording the vocals for five songs in one weekend, based on music the band had composed several months earlier. By getting involved with Soulmaker, she drew inspiration from a work by Jean-Paul Sartre to write her first song, "Les Mouches" (lit. 'The Flies'), at 20. The band members were influenced by Megadeth and Metallica, while Viotti was more influenced by Pantera. With Viotti, Soulmaker rehearsed at Fort Hatry in Belfort and performed one concert per week.

When Viotti was a member of Soulmaker, the band released two albums, Obsessions in 2007 and Discordances in 2010. Viotti would tour with Soulmaker for seven years. She obtained two master's degrees, one in letters and the other in philosophy, as well as a bachelor's degree in event marketing.

After leaving the Lycée du Parc, Viotti attended the Euromed Business School, later known as "Kedge", in Marseille, France, for two years. Within a hardcore punk association of Marseille, she organised concerts in the small venue La Machine à coudre (lit. 'The Sewing Machine'). Also in Marseille, Roland Hayrabedian gave her lessons in choral conducting. Viotti volunteered at the Hellfest music festival and performed with her metal band in Europe on weekends.

=== Opera ===
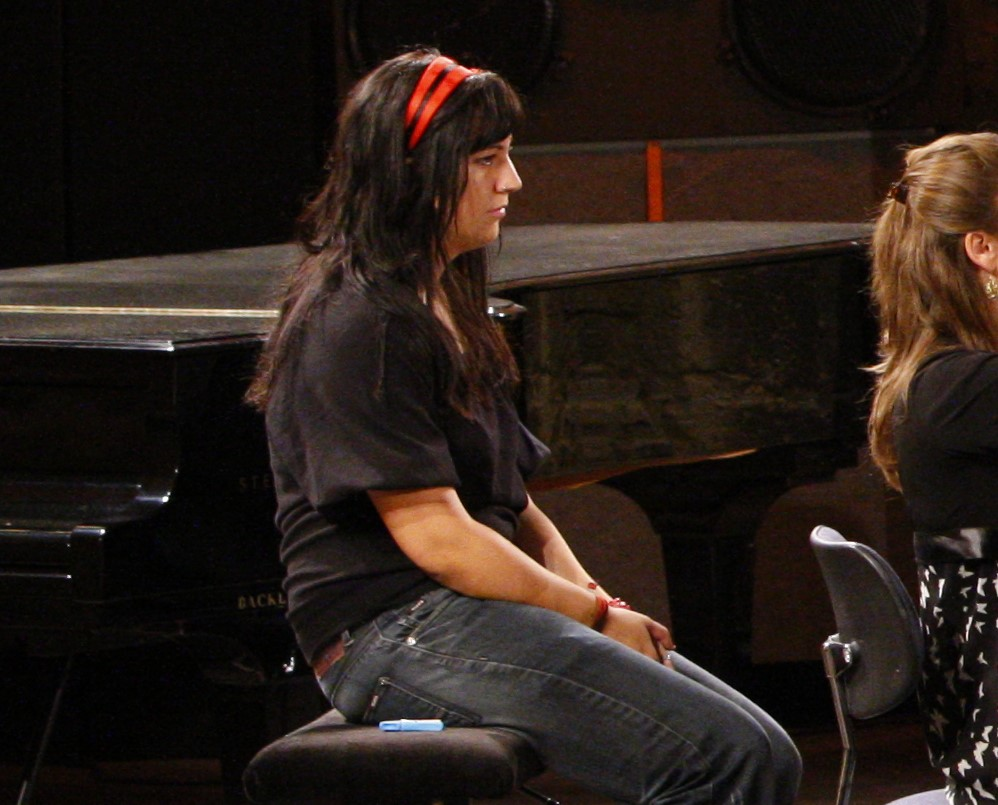
Viotti in Salon-de-Provence, France, in 2009

Viotti attended concerts scheduled as part of a classical music festival, for which her school had selected her for an event marketing internship. She later said, "I realised how much I missed it". At the age of 24, with several years of experience in metal music, Viotti discovered Verdi through Simon Boccanegra in Vienna, Austria. She decided to drop out of Kedge. Viotti later told Marie-Eve Barbier of La Provence: "I was between two lives ... I climbed the ranks in metal, and at the same time, it was in Marseille that I discovered my operatic voice and switched in this world."

In 2011, Viotti moved to Vienna to train in opera singing with Heidi Brunner. Wanting to learn opera singing, Viotti nevertheless faced the obstacle of her age, and the opera world did not appreciate either her nose piercing or her gothic look. Brunner nevertheless wanted to hear her and asked her to sing a Soulmaker song rather than perform a piece from the classical repertoire. Brunner "immediately noticed her vocal placement, even on metal". Brunner agreed, however, only after verifying an X-ray which showed no damage to Viotti's vocal cords due to her past as a metal singer. Brunner then trained Viotti in Vienna.

She then continued her studies to hone her skills with Raúl Giménez in Barcelona, Spain.

Following this, Viotti joined the Gustav Mahler and Wiener Singverein choirs, then went to the Vienna Opera to join the extra chorus. In Rossini's Petite messe solennelle, she made her first soloist appearance, followed by performances in Turin and Milan, Italy, where she sang the role of La Récitante in La Damoiselle élue. She was 27 years old at the time.

In 2013, Viotti joined Brigitte Balleys's master class at the Lausanne Conservatory (HEMU), where she earned a soloist diploma.

Viotti participated in her first lyrical singing competition in November 2014, in France, at the Mâcon International Singing Competition, held at the Scène Nationale Theatre, with the Mâcon Symphony Orchestra. Four of the six selected singers received awards. Viotti finished first and won the Opera First Prize.

During her solo career, Viotti was engaged by the opera houses of Munich, Lausanne and Zurich, as well as the Lucerne Theatre in Switzerland. In 2015, she won the Belcanto International Prize at the Rossini Opera Festival in Wildbad, Germany, and, the following year, was awarded Third Prize at the Geneva International Music Competition in Switzerland. She has also received several scholarships, including the Leenaards Scholarship in 2016.

In 2017, she was preparing for her first title role, Isabella, in L'italiana in Algeri at the Lucerne Opera, and she also performed in Germany, Barcelona, Saint Petersburg, Russia, and Strasbourg, France. In 2017, she won the Audience Choice Award and the Award for Best Swiss Candidate at the first edition of the Kattenburg Competition at the Lausanne Opera in Switzerland.

Votti sang in Pierre-Emmanuel Rousseau's production of The Barber of Seville, in the role of Rosina, at the Opéra national du Rhin, in Mulhouse, France, in 2018. In 2018, she was named a finalist in the Operalia Competition, and in 2019, was named Young Singer of the Year at the International Opera Awards.

She honed her technique during the coronavirus pandemic. After the performances in Mulhouse and Strasbourg, the production of The Barber of Seville moved at a Gallo-Roman theatre in Sanxay, France, for three dates in August 2020, where Viotti reprised her role as Rosina.

By 2021, Viotti had performed in Poulenc's opera La Voix humaine and was then offered principal roles in major opera houses.

In 2022, she was awarded the Swiss Music Prize by the Federal Office of Culture. That same year, she performed in Rome, Italy, in a leading role in Gluck's Alceste. She also had a role in Offenbach's La Périchole, which took place at the Théâtre des Champs-Élysées in Paris, France. She also worked with Les Talens Lyriques on a 2022 tribute album to Pauline Viardot.

In 2023, Viotti won the Victoire de la Musique Classique in France in the category of "Lyrical Artist of the Year". She performed on the second day of the 36th edition of Un violon sur le sable (lit. 'A violin on the sand'), a classical music festival in Royan, France, in July 2023. In 2023, she made her debut at the Paris Opera, performing Stefano in Charles Gounod's Roméo et Juliette, noting that she had already sung this role at La Scala. She was accompanied by Léa Desandre. In September 2023, Viotti performed at the Dresden Opera in Germany. From 9 to 19 October 2023, she performed in Rossini's La Cenerentola, directed by Damiano Michieletto and presented at the Théâtre des Champs-Élysées.

Viotti made her debut in Georges Bizet's Carmen in Zurich in 2024. Viotti had the role of Carmen for a series of twelve performances of the four-act comic opera from 7 April to 17 June 2024 at the Zurich Opera, accompanied by the Philharmonia Zurich. She had previously refused to sing Carmen six times because she felt too young. Singing Carmen at 25 "makes no sense", she said, stressing the need to have real-life experience "as a woman" and to be "ready, vocally but also physically". She emphasised the stage presence required to embody Carmen, a stage constantly occupied by the performer, from beginning to end, and with "sensuality", adding: "Vocally, you must have [plenty of] breath, and psychologically, so much is happening." She felt that before 2024 she lacked "certain colours and corporality" and was therefore not ready to sing in Carmen; "even though technically, I could have done it".

==== 2024 Olympics collaboration with Gojira ====
On 26 July 2024, Viotti participated in one of the opening ceremony acts for the 2024 Summer Olympics in Paris alongside the band Gojira, performing "Mea Culpa (Ah! Ça ira!)", a metal adaptation of the French Revolution song "Ah! ca ira!", but with the additional incorporation of an excerpt from "L'amour est un oiseau rebelle". While Gojira performed on the façade of the Conciergerie, Viotti appeared singing on board a boat in reference to the motto of the city of Paris, "Fluctuat nec mergitur" (Il est battu par les flots, mais ne sombre pas; lit. 'It is battered by the waves, but does not sink'). Juliette de Banes Gardonne of Le Temps described the performance as a "metalo-lyrical tidal wave". As part of the final celebration of the Olympic Games, the collaborative performance was projected onto the Arc de Triomphe in Paris on the night of 14 September 2024, while Viotti stood before the monument to reprise her part. She was given the role of Siebel in Gounod's five-act opera, Faust, at the Opéra Bastille in Paris in September and October 2024.

On 2 February 2025, Viotti won the Grammy Award for Best Metal Performance for "Mea Culpa (Ah! Ça ira!)", a collaboration with Gojira and Victor Le Masne, at the 67th ceremony in Los Angeles, United States. She is the first woman to win an award in this category since its inception. She made the round trip in 48 hours between Barcelona, where she was performing, and Los Angeles to attend the ceremony with Gojira and Le Masne. She later described her win as paying gratitude to her former heavy metal singer career and the bands she's been in.

At the opening ceremony of Paris Saint-Germain FC's football match against AJ Auxerre on the 34th day of Ligue 1 at the Parc des Princes in May 2025, Viotti sang "Le Cœur de Paris" (lit. 'The Heart of Paris'), an "hybrid" song composed for the event by Parisian DJ Michaël Canitrot. On 5 July 2025, Viotti appeared with Gojira at the Ozzy Osbourne and Black Sabbath tribute concert, Back to the Beginning, performing "Mea Culpa (Ah! Ça ira!)", which took place at Villa Park in Birmingham, United Kingdom. In 2025, she performed as Charlotte in Massenet's Werther and Octavian in Strauss' Der Rosenkavalier, both at the Théâtre des Champs-Élysées in Paris. In September 2025, Viotti was named Knight of the Order of Arts and Letters by the Government of France. She continued to perform during a busy season, reprising the title role of Carmen at the Dallas Opera, and the role of Jocasta in Stravinsky's Oedipus Rex.

In January 2026, Viotti performed at the Zurich Opera in the role of Prince Orlofsky in Die Fledermaus with her brother Lorenzo conducting.

== Artistry ==
=== Voice and style ===
As an opera singer, Viotti, also known as a cantatrice, or "lyrical singer", has a mezzo-soprano voice type.

Todd Camburn, pianist at the Lausanne Conservatory, commented that by studying bel canto technique with Giménez, Viotti made her "vocal breakthrough". At the conclusion of the 2017 Kattenburg Competition, Hervé Klopfenstein, president of the jury and director of HEMU Vaud-Valais-Fribourg of the Lausanne Conservatory, said that "Her vocal security, her very rich tessitura with timbres resonating in the extreme low register" made her stand out, as well as her "closeness with the audience". In his review of The Barber of Seville at the Opéra national du Rhin in 2018, Antoine Brunetto of Forum Opéra praised Viotti's "deep and shimmering mezzo" and added that "the voice, well-projected, is long and homogeneous throughout the entire tessitura, the beaded vocalisations flow, without any harshness".

Her style ranges "from Bach to Édith Piaf, from the lyrical repertoire to cabaret", as well as from baroque to operetta and bel canto.

== Personal life ==
In 2019, Viotti was diagnosed with cancer. Suffering from a tumour in her thorax, she faced an uncertain prognosis as to whether she would ever be able to sing again, with the possibility of dying. She had not wanted to reveal her cancer to La Scala in Milan and had concealed her disease, for fear of discouraging her employer. She underwent chemotherapy and made her La Scala debut six weeks after her last radiation treatment. She subsequently achieved complete remission. On her album, Melankhôlia: In Darkness Through the Light, Viotti juxtaposed works by Björk, Metallica, Lana Del Rey, U2 and Neil Young with those of composer John Dowland, which she described as "a bit like the soundtrack to this experience, this journey through darkness and light".

== Discography ==
Lost Legacy

- EP (—)

Soulmaker

- Obsessions (2007)
- Discordances (2010)

Classical

- A Tribute to Pauline Viardot (Viotti with Christophe Rousset and Les Talens Lyriques) (2022)
- Mezzo Mozart (2024)
- Melankhôlia: In Darkness Through the Light (2024)

== Written works ==
- Viotti, Marina; Halpern, Gabrielle (October 2023). Et si le monde était un opéra? La chanteuse et la philosophe [What if the world were an opera? The singer and the philosopher] (in French). Vaucluse: Éditions de l'Aube. ISBN 978-2-8159-5580-5.
