= Housse de Racket =

French band

- Origin: Paris, France
- Genres: Synth-pop; funk
- Labels: Maison Kitsuné
- Members: Pierre Leroux; Victor Le Masne

Housse de Racket are a musical duo from Paris, France. The band consists of Pierre Leroux and Victor Le Masne.

== Biography ==
Leroux and Le Masne studied at a music conservatory and began as session musicians for Air and Phoenix. Their first album Forty Love was released in 2010, and their second album Alésia was released in 2011. Alésia was produced by Philippe Zdar of Cassius. In 2015, a third album titled The Tourist followed.

== Discography ==
=== Studio albums ===
- Forty Love (2008)
- Alésia (2011)
- The Tourist (2015)

=== EPs ===
- Oh Yeah! EP 1 (2008)
- Oh Yeah! EP 2 (2008)

=== Singles ===
- Roman (2011)
- Château (2012)
- Aquarium (2012)
- L'incendie (2012)
- The Tourist (2015)
- Turqoise (2015)
- Le Rayon Vert (2016)
