= Carmagnole =

Song

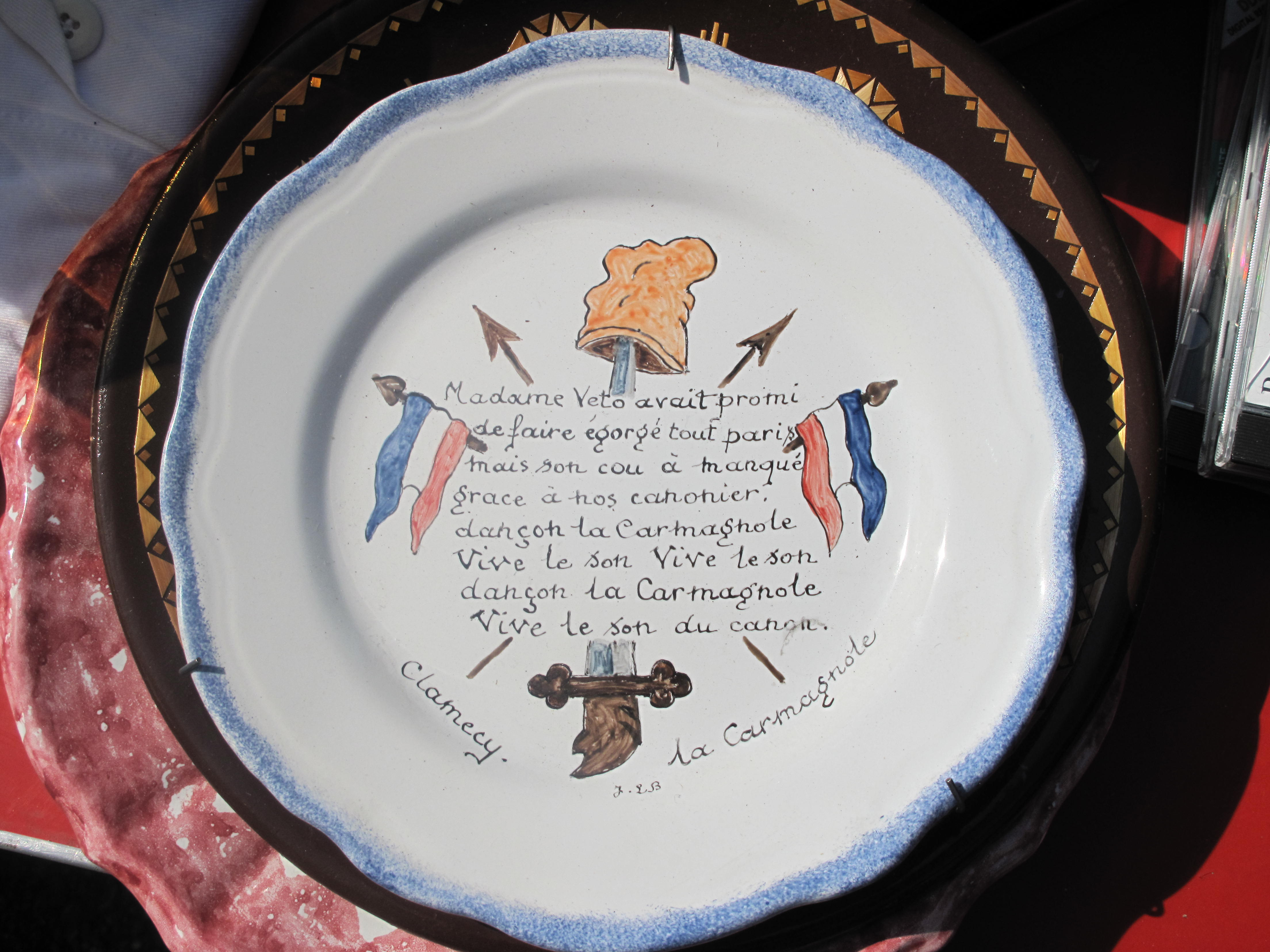
Plate with the text of the beginning of the song

"La Carmagnole" is a French song created and made popular during the French Revolution, accompanied by a wild dance of the same name that may have also been brought into France by the Piedmontese. It was first sung in August 1792 and was successively added to during the revolutionary events of 1830, 1848, 1863–64, and 1882-83. The authors are not known. The title refers to the short jacket worn by working-class militant sans-culottes, adopted from the Piedmontese peasant costume named for the town of Carmagnola.

It sarcastically sings of the triumphs over the Queen of France, Marie Antoinette (Madame Veto), King Louis XVI (Monsieur Veto), and the French monarchists in general.

== History ==
Carmagnole, after an item on display at the Musée de l'Armée, Paris.

There are varied accounts of the song and where it was sung. It was mainly a rallying cry or entertainment for revolutionaries. It was also used to insult opponents of the French Revolution. A popular punishment was to make anti-revolutionaries "sing and dance the Carmagnole", which could be done to marquises, dames, princes, monks, bishops, archbishops, cardinals and the like. La Carmagnole has also been documented as a battle cry. At the battle of Jemappes on 6 November 1792 it is written that, "the sans-culottes in the army rushed the enemy singing "La Marseillaise" and "La Carmagnole." It was a great republican victory, and all of Belgium fell to the revolutionary armies."

When not sung during an actual battle, the Carmagnole was often sung after political or military victories. One such event occurred after the storming of the Tuileries Palace on the night of August 9–10, 1792. The radical people of Paris asserted their power by forcing the king to flee to the nearby National Assembly. After storming the palace and massacring the King's personal Swiss Guard, the mob of Paris was "drunk with blood, danced and sang the Carmagnole to celebrate the victory." The song was also more generally associated with grassroots popular displays, such as festivals or the planting of liberty trees. It was common to include public singing at these symbolic events, and over the course of the Revolution "some 60,000 liberty trees were planted" giving the people many opportunities to sing.

== Importance ==
Song was a very important means of expression in France during the Revolution. La Marseillaise, which has since become the French National Anthem, was written during this period. It has been written that, "Frenchmen took pride in their habit of singing and regarded it as one source of their success." In France, heroism was linked to gaiety. In the preface to the Chansonnier de la République there are questions that the French Republic poses to the world: "What will the ferocious reactionaries, who accuse France of unity, say when they see them equal to the heroes of antiquity in singing the Carmagnole? What will they say when they hear on the battlefields of the republicans these patriotic refrains, which precede and follow the most bloody combats?" La Carmagnole, and revolutionary song in general, was viewed as an important part of the new French Republic, and of being a Frenchman. La Carmagnole was particularly popular because, like the song Ah! ça ira ("It'll do", "Everything will be OK"), it contained simple lyrics that illiterate people could easily learn and understand, and therefore participate in singing.

== Literary references ==
The Carmagnole is mentioned in A Tale of Two Cities by Charles Dickens, The Scarlet Pimpernel by Baroness Orczy and plays an important role in The Song at the Scaffold, a novella written by Gertrud von Le Fort. La Carmagnole is also sung by the chorus in Act III of Umberto Giordano's opera Andrea Chénier, and it is sung in the closing dialogue of Eugene O'Neill's play The Iceman Cometh. Carl Schurz, in v. 1, ch. 14, of his Reminiscences., reports from exile in England that upon Napoleon III's coup d'état of 2 December 1851, "Our French friends shouted and shrieked and gesticulated and hurled opprobrious names at Louis Napoleon and cursed his helpers, and danced the Carmagnole and sang 'Ça Ira.'" In Les Misérables, Victor Hugo contrasts it to the Marseillaise, writing "With just the ′Carmagnole′ to sing [a Parisian] will only overthrow Louis XVI; but give him the ′Marseillaise′ and he will liberate the world." It is also mentioned in Chapter 37 of Umberto Eco's Foucault's Pendulum. In the first volume of John Dos Passos's U.S.A. Trilogy, 42nd Parallel a group of revolutionary workers in Mexico sing the Carmagnole when an American radical visits them.

In the Greek island of Samos, then under Ottoman rule, the Carmagnole gave its name to the political faction of the Karmanioloi, who, inspired by the French Revolution's liberal and democratic ideals, opposed the traditional, reactionary land-holding notables (nicknamed Kallikantzaroi). The struggle of the two parties dominated the political affairs of the island in the years leading up to the outbreak of the Greek War of Independence in 1821, when the Karmanioloi faction led Samos to join the uprising.

== Lyrics ==
La Carmagnole
Madame Veto avait promis,	Madame Veto had promised.
Madame Veto avait promis.	Madame Veto had promised.
de faire égorger tout Paris,	To cut everyone's throat in Paris.
de faire égorger tout Paris.	To cut everyone's throat in Paris.
Mais son coup a manqué	But she failed to do this,
grâce à nos canonniers.	Thanks to our gunners.
Refrain :	Refrain:
Dansons la Carmagnole	Let us dance the Carmagnole
Vive le son,	Long live the sound
Vive le son.	Long live the sound
Dansons la Carmagnole	Let us dance the Carmagnole
Vive le son du canon.	Long live the sound of the cannons.
Monsieur Veto avait promis (bis)	Mr. Veto had promised (repeat)
D'être fidèle à son pays, (bis)	To be loyal to his country, (repeat)
Mais il y a manqué,	But he failed to be,
Ne faisons plus quartier.	Let us show no mercy.
Refrain	Refrain
Antoinette avait résolu (bis)	Antoinette had decided (repeat)
De nous faire tomber sur le cul; (bis)	To drop us on our arses; (repeat)
Mais le coup a manqué	But the plan was foiled
Elle a le nez cassé.	And she fell on her face.
Refrain	Refrain
Son Mari se croyant vainqueur, (bis)	Her husband, thinking he was victorious, (repeat)
Connaissait peu notre valeur, (bis)	Little did he know our value, (repeat)
Va, Louis, gros paour,	Go, Louis, big crybaby,
Du Temple dans la tour.	From the Temple into the tower.
Refrain	Refrain
Les Suisses avaient promis, (bis)	The Swiss had promised, (repeat)
Qu'ils feraient feu sur nos amis, (bis)	That they would fire on our friends, (repeat)
Mais comme ils ont sauté!	But how they jumped!
Comme ils ont tous dansé!	How they all danced!
Refrain	Refrain
Quand Antoinette vit la tour, (bis)	When Antoinette saw the tower, (repeat)
Elle voulut faire demi-tour, (bis)	She wanted to turn back, (repeat)
Elle avait mal au coeur	She is sick at heart
De se voir sans honneur	To see herself without honor.
Refrain	Refrain
Refrain	Refrain
Refrain	Refrain

== Other versions ==
- La Ravachole, an anarchist version also known as la Nouvelle Carmagnole.
- La Carmagnole des royalistes.
