= Mea Culpa (Ah! Ça ira!) =

"Mea Culpa (Ah! Ça Ira)"

Single by Gojira, Marina Viotti, Victor Le Masne
- Released: August 30, 2024
- Recorded: 2024
- Genre: Heavy metal; opera; classical crossover
- Length: 2:53
- Label: IOC; BMG
- Songwriters: Joe Duplantier, Victor Le Masne
- Producer: Victor Le Masne

Gojira singles chronology
"Our Time Is Now" (2022)	"Mea Culpa (Ah! Ça Ira)" (2024)

Mea Culpa (Ah! Ça Ira) is a collaborative single by French metal band Gojira, opera singer Marina Viotti, and composer Victor Le Masne, released on August 30, 2024. The song was commissioned for the opening ceremony of the 2024 Summer Olympics in Paris, where it was performed live in a dramatic spectacle featuring pyrotechnics, orchestral musicians, and revolutionary symbolism.

== Background ==
Gojira made history as the first metal band to perform at an Olympic opening ceremony. The performance took place on July 26, 2024, from the windows of the historic Conciergerie in Paris. The band collaborated with French-Swiss mezzo-soprano and former heavy metal singer Marina Viotti and composer Victor Le Masne to reinterpret the French Revolution-era anthem Ah! Ça ira.

The title combines the Latin phrase Mea culpa ("my fault") with the revolutionary slogan Ah! Ça ira ("It will be fine").

== Composition ==
The song blends Gojira’s signature heavy metal sound with operatic vocals and orchestral arrangements. It opens with chanted refrains of Ah! Ça ira and Mea culpa, layered over heavy guitar riffs and cinematic percussion. Viotti’s operatic delivery contrasts with Joe Duplantier’s growled vocals.

The track was arranged by Victor Le Masne, known for his work in classical and pop crossover productions.

== Personnel ==
- Joe Duplantier – vocals, rhythm guitar
- Mario Duplantier – drums
- Christian Andreu – lead guitar
- Jean-Michel Labadie – bass
- Marina Viotti – vocals
- Victor Le Masne – arrangement, production

== Reception ==
The performance was widely acclaimed and became one of the most talked-about moments of the 2024 Summer Olympics. Critics praised the fusion of genres and the bold inclusion of metal in a traditionally classical setting. The official video garnered over 6 million views within its first week of release.

In February 2025, Gojira won the Grammy Award for Best Metal Performance for “Mea Culpa (Ah! Ça ira!),” marking their first Grammy win after three previous nominations. Frontman Joe Duplantier dedicated the award to bands “pushing the boundaries” and emphasized the importance of supporting local artists.
