= Victor Le Masne =

French musician and composer (born 1982)

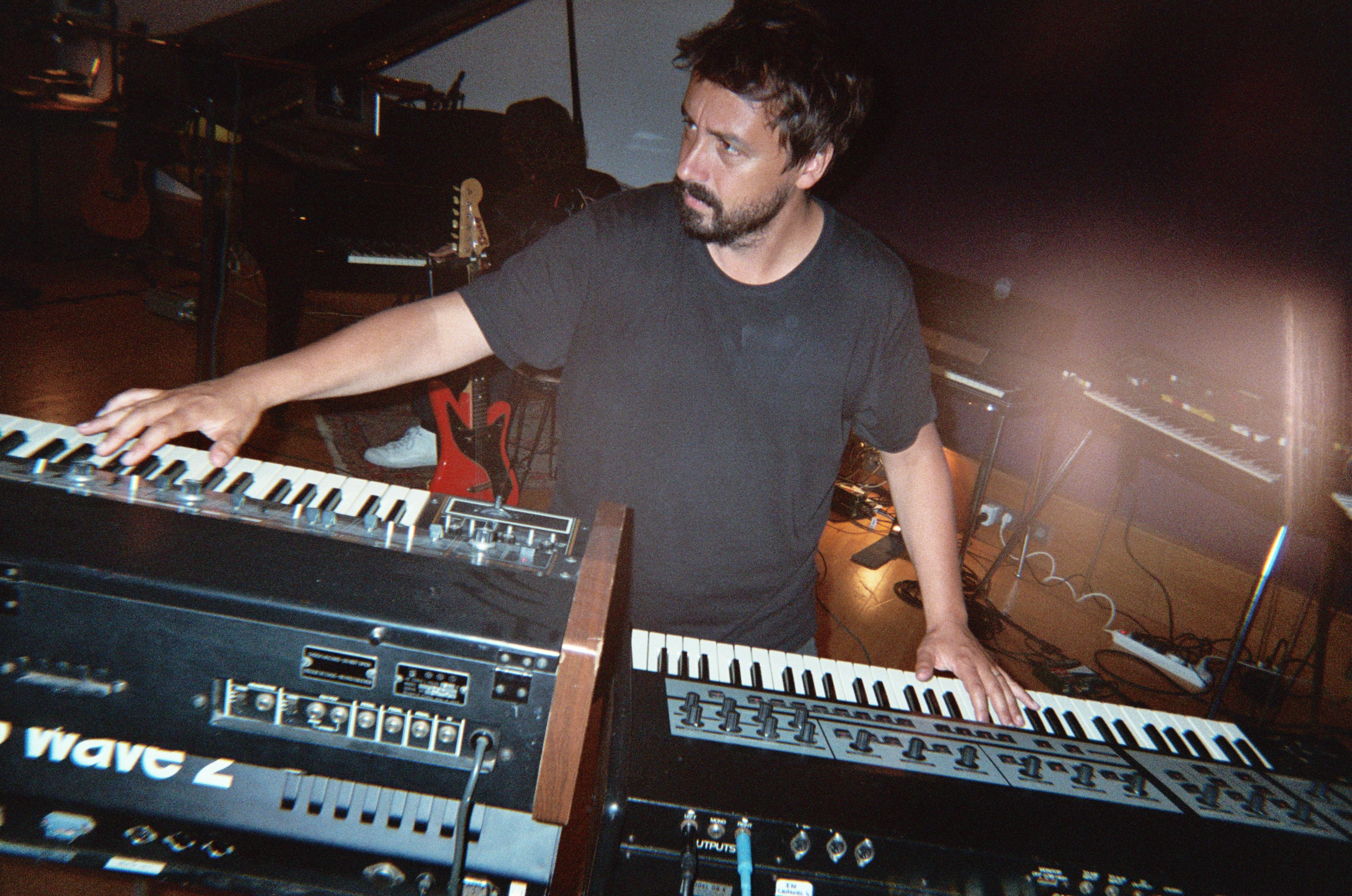
- Le Masne in 2018

Background information
- Born: 8 February 1982 (age 44); Paris, France
- Instruments: Drums, Keyboards
- Website: victorlemasne.com

Victor Le Masne (born 8 February 1982) is a French musician and composer mainly associated with electronic and pop music. He is frequently associated with the French touch movement. In addition to electronic and pop, Le Masne has also composed in jazz and classical styles. Le Masne produced "Parade", the official anthem of the Paris 2024 Summer Olympics, and figured as a musical director for all four ceremonies.

== Biography ==
=== Early life ===
Victor Le Masne was born on 8 February 1982 in Paris. His father, Xavier le Masne, a flautist, had directed several music conservatories. Le Masne was influenced by the work of Iannis Xenakis.

He studied piano, percussion, and trained at the Conservatoire à Rayonnement Régional de Boulogne-Billancourt. In 2005, he co-founded the band Housse de Racket with Pierre Leroux, as the duo's drummer.

=== Career ===
In 2022, Le Masne served as the musical director for a new version of the rock opera Starmania. Directed by Thomas Jolly, this version featured re-arrangements by Le Masne.

On 2 May 2024, the Paris Olympics Organizing Committee announced that Le Masne was appointed as the musical director for the ceremonies of the Olympics and Paralympics. Le Masne composed "Parade", the anthem of the Games of the XXXIII Olympiad.

== Music ==
=== Style ===
According to La Croix, Le Masne is recognized as a representative of the French touch movement. With Housse de Racket, his music leaned towards electronic; however, his solo work diverges from electronic pop. For example, his album May 20th features jazz styling, while "Parade", composed for the Paris 2024 Olympics, utilizes classical orchestral arrangements.

=== Solo work ===
In 2021, Le Masne completed his third album May 20th in one week, spending one day each on preparing, recording, selecting, mixing, and mastering.

=== Collaboration with international artists ===
Le Masne has collaborated with several international artists. He worked on The Weeknd's EP My Dear Melancholy (2018), arranging for the tracks "Call Out My Name" and "Try Me". Additionally, he has collaborated with artists such as Bryan Ferry, Lana Del Rey, and Arcade Fire.

=== Arranging Starmania ===
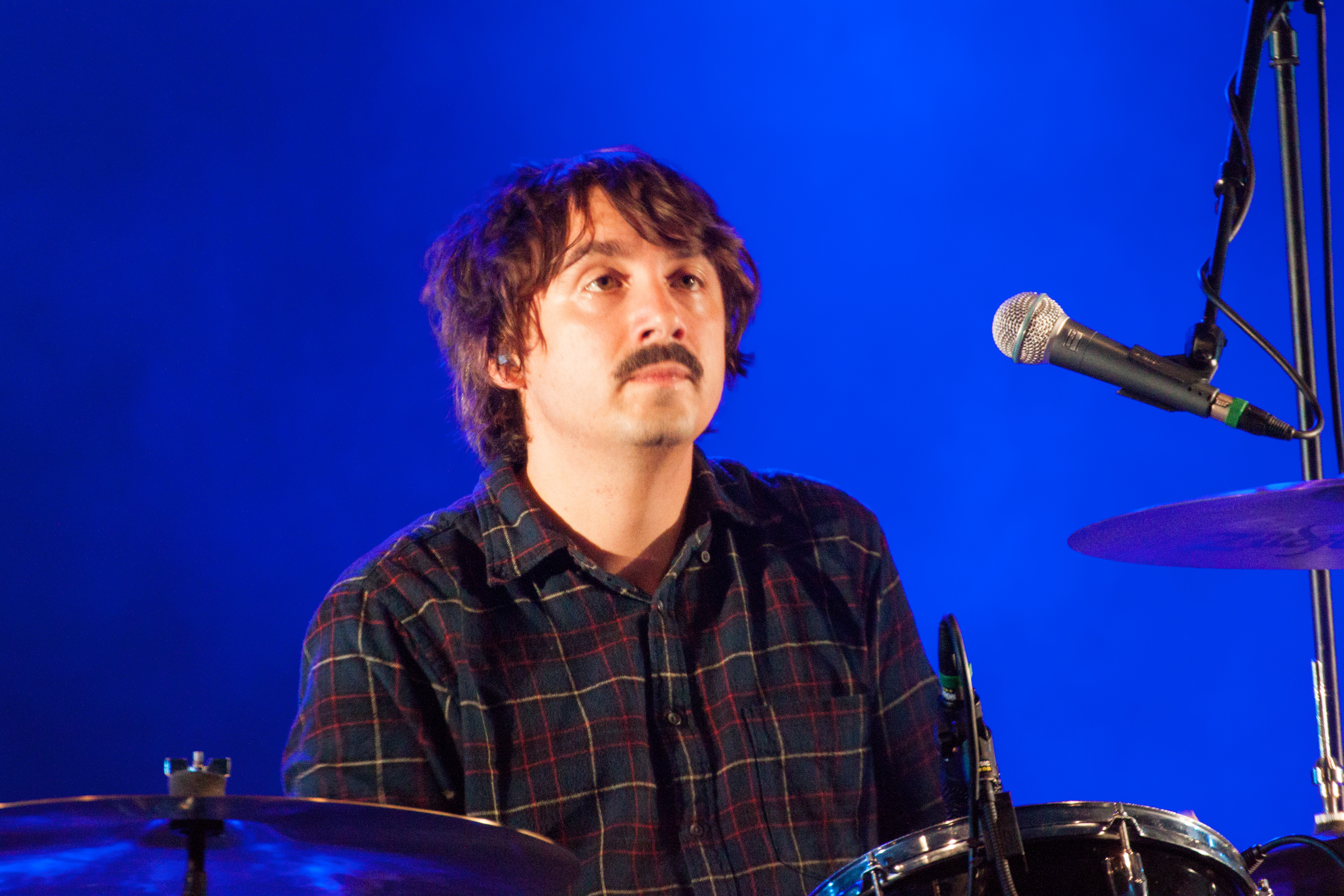
Le Masne in 2012

At the end of the 2010s, Le Masne worked with director Thomas Jolly to modernize the rock opera musical Starmania, introducing pieces omitted in prior versions and modernizing the arrangements. Le Masne handled the musical direction. Le Masne's objective was to modernize the original score (dating back to 1979). Jolly reintroduced an orchestra into the musical production, with live performances from the orchestra pit.

The duo also sought to reintroduce pieces previously removed in earlier versions, such as "Masse Médias", "Paranoïa", and "Sex Shop", which were rearranged and reinstated. Le Masne arranged the music, referencing the voices of historical performers like Daniel Balavoine and France Gall.

=== Rearrangement of La Marseillaise for the Closing Ceremony of the Tokyo Olympics ===
As part of the 2020 Summer Olympics closing ceremony (held in 2021), Le Masne arranged a new version of "La Marseillaise" for the handover between Tokyo and Paris.

=== Musical direction for the Paris 2024 Olympics ===
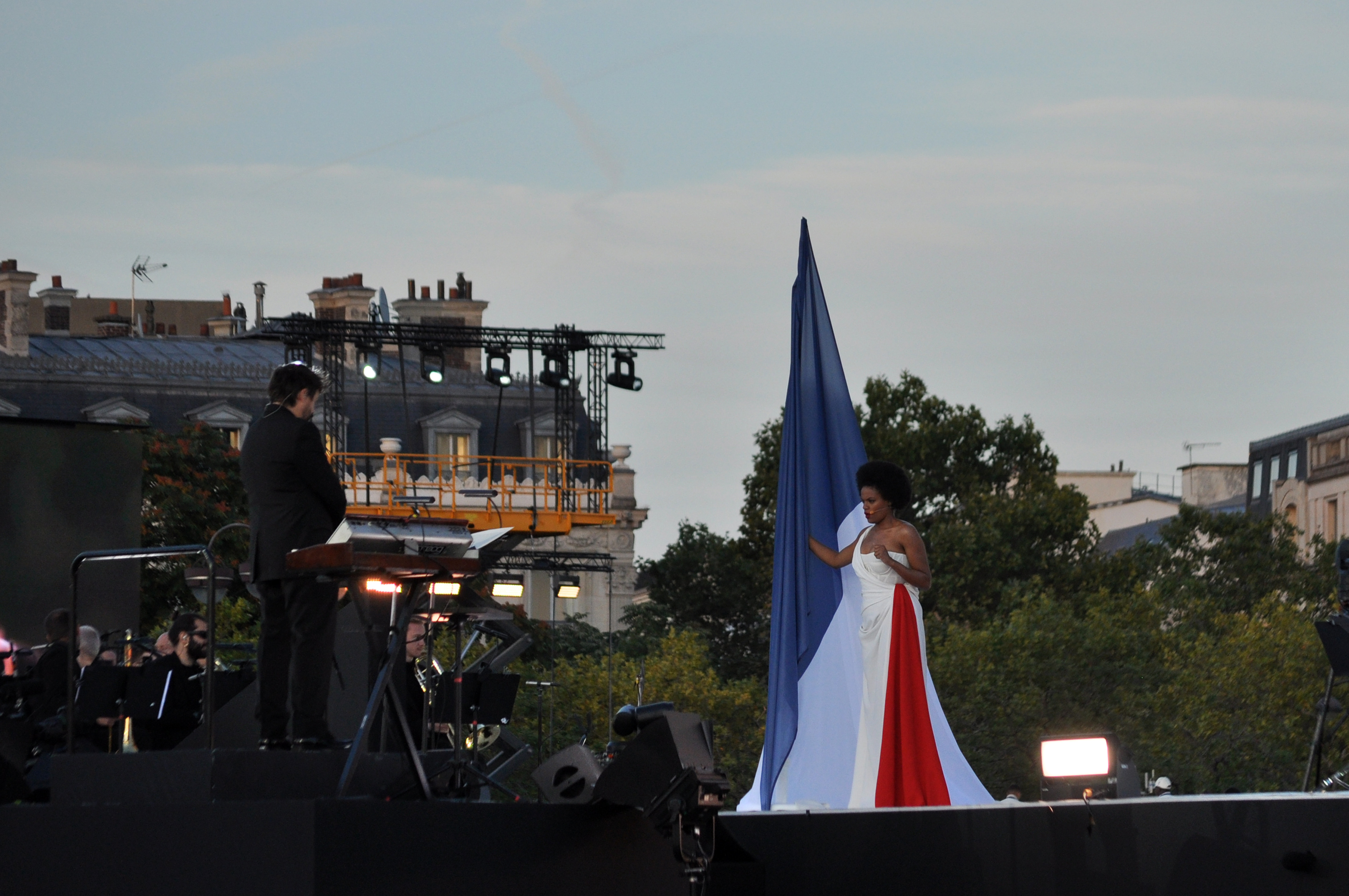
Le Masne and Axelle Saint-Cirel at the Parade des Champions Paris 2024 in the Champs-Élysées avenue

Starting in 2023, Thomas Jolly, artistic director of the 2024 Summer Olympics in Paris, decided to collaborate with Le Masne for the musical aspects of the event's artistic projects, citing their prior work on Starmania when making this decision. In May 2024, the Paris Olympics Organizing Committee officially announced Le Masne as the musical director for the ceremonies of the Olympic Games and Paralympic Games.

As the official composer for the event, Le Masne created "Parade," which served as the anthem of the 2024 Olympiad. This musical theme was composed specifically for the Olympic event. It should not be confused with the Olympic Hymn, which serves as the universal musical symbol of the Olympic Games.

Le Masne was featured in the Olympic Channel's full-length documentary La Grande Seine, which covers the creation and development of the 2024 Summer Olympics opening ceremony. This documentary was released in December 2024.

In February 2025, the opening ceremony presentation of Mea Culpa (Ah! Ça ira!) by Le Masne, Gojira, and Marina Viotti, received the Grammy Award for Best Metal Performance.

== Discography ==
=== Albums ===
- Forty Love with Housse de Racket (2008)
- Alesia with Housse de Racket (2011)
- The Tourist with Housse de Racket (2015)
- May 20th (2021)
- Ravel Recomposed (2025)

=== Soundtracks ===
- "Parade" – Anthem for the 2024 Summer Olympics (2024)
- Music from The Opening Ceremony of The Olympic Games Paris 2024 – Soundtrack for the 2024 Summer Olympics (2024)

=== Collaborations ===
- My Dear Melancholy by The Weeknd – Arrangements for "Call Out My Name" and "Try Me" (2018)
- Ultraviolence by Lana Del Rey – Additional production and arrangements (2014)
- Escapades by Gaspard Augé - Additional production and arrangements (2021)

=== Remixes ===
- Myd ft. Mac DeMarco - Moving Men (Gaspard Augé & Victor Le Masne "Removing Men" Remix)
- Jungle - Keep Moving (Gaspard Augé & Victor Le Masne Remix)
- FOALS - Wake Me Up (Gaspard Augé & Victor Le Masne Remix)
- Parcels - Somethinggreater (Gaspard Augé & Victor Le Masne Remix)
- Kavinsky - Cameo (Gaspard Augé & Victor Le Masne Remix)

== Filmography ==
Year	Title	Role	Notes
2024	La Grande Seine	Himself	Appeared in the documentary about the creation and development of the 2024 Summer Olympics opening ceremony.

== Awards ==
Year	Award	Recipient(s)	Work
2025	Grammy Award for Best Metal Performance	Gojira, Marina Viotti and Victor Le Masne	"Mea Culpa (Ah! Ça ira!)"
