= Forum Opéra =

Swiss operatic association

Forum Opéra—also known as AAOL or Association des amis de l'opéra de Lausanne / Association of Friends of the Lausanne Opera House—is a Swiss operatic association that promotes opera and bel canto within the French-speaking part of Switzerland.

== History ==
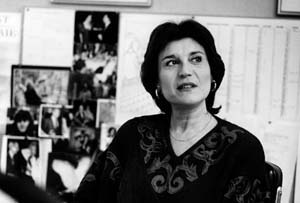
Renée Auphan in 1988

Forum Opéra is based on Swiss law according to articles 60 et seq. of Swiss Civil Code of 10 December 1907.

Created on 17 August 1987, it is chaired by its founder, Georges Reymond, a Swiss lawyer. It is sponsored by Franco-Swiss mezzo-soprano Renée Auphan, (Note: Renée Auphan was the former director of Théâtre municipal de Lausanne before taking over as director of Grand Théâtre de Genève.) and by Swiss tenor Éric Tappy.

Among additional goals, the organization aims to support and promote opera in Romandie and, above all, in Lausanne.
