= Grammy Award for Best Metal Performance =

Honor presented to recording artists for quality metal performances

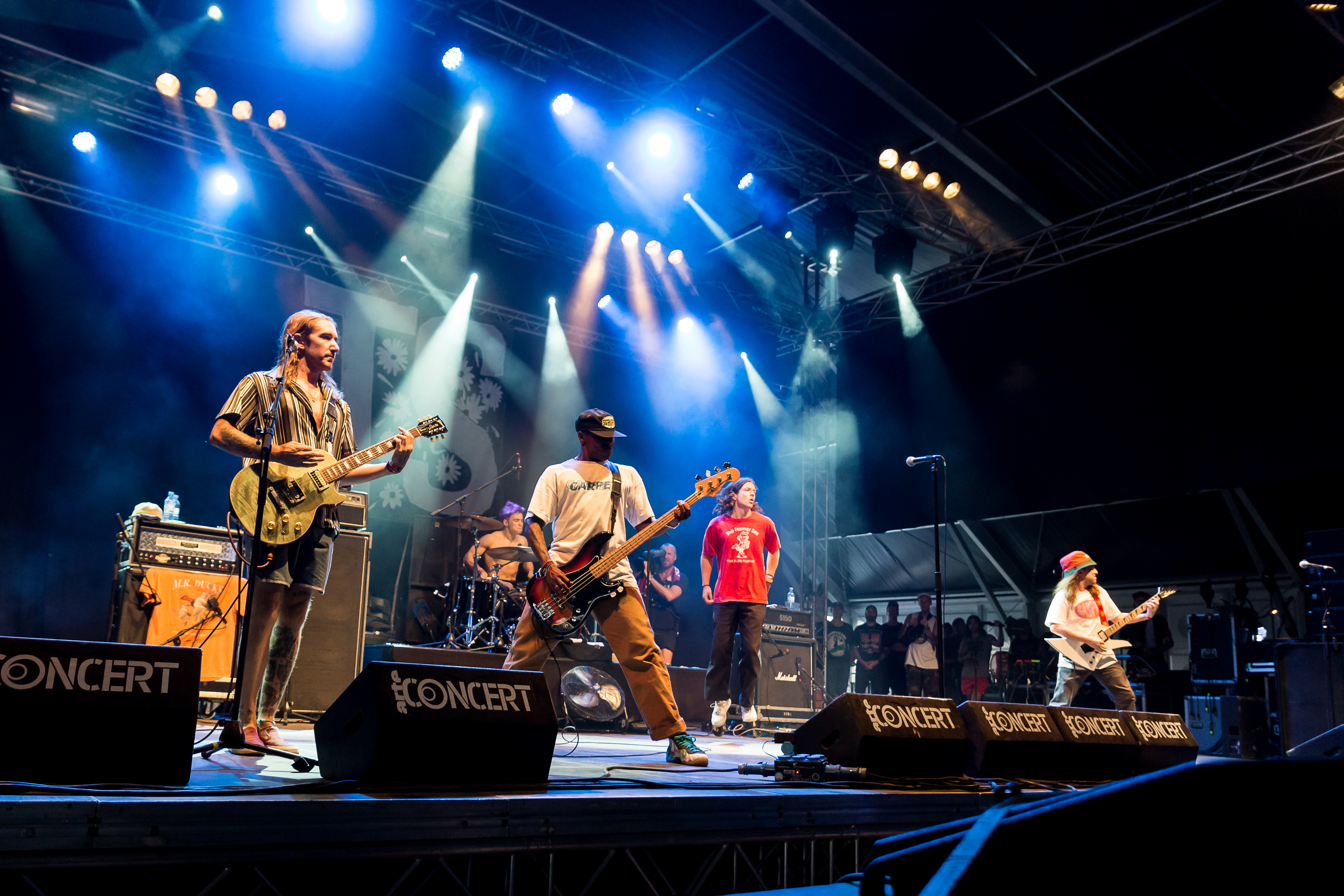
- "Birds" by Turnstile is the most recent recipient
- Awarded for: Quality performances in the heavy metal music genre
- Country: United States
- Presented by: The Recording Academy
- First award: 1990
- Currently held by: Turnstile, "Birds" (2026)
- Website: grammy.com

The Grammy Award for Best Metal Performance is an award presented at the Grammy Awards to recording artists for works (songs or albums) containing quality performances in the heavy metal music genre. The Grammy Awards is an annual ceremony, where honors in several categories are presented by The Recording Academy of the United States to "honor artistic achievement, technical proficiency and overall excellence in the recording industry, without regard to album sales or chart position". The ceremony was established in 1958 and originally called the Gramophone Awards.

The Recording Academy recognized heavy metal music artists for the first time at the 31st Annual Grammy Awards (1989). The category was originally presented as Best Hard Rock/Metal Performance Vocal or Instrumental, combining two of the most popular music genres of the 1980s. Jethro Tull won that award for the album Crest of a Knave, beating Metallica, which were expected to win with the album ...And Justice for All. This choice led to widespread criticism of The Recording Academy, as journalists suggested that the music of Jethro Tull did not belong in the hard rock or heavy metal genres. In response, The Recording Academy created the categories Best Hard Rock Performance and Best Metal Performance, separating the genres.

The Best Metal Performance category was first presented at the 32nd Annual Grammy Awards in 1990, and was again the subject of controversy when rock musician Chris Cornell (lead vocalist for the band Soundgarden) was perplexed by the academy's nomination of the band Dokken in this category. Metallica won in the first three years. The awards were presented for the song "One", a cover version of Queen's "Stone Cold Crazy", and the album Metallica. During 2012–2013, the award was temporarily discontinued in a major overhaul of Grammy categories; all solo or duo/group performances in the hard rock and metal categories were shifted to the newly formed Best Hard Rock/Metal Performance category. However, in 2014, the Best Hard Rock/Metal Performance category was split, returning the Best Metal Performance category and recognizing quality hard rock performances in the Best Rock Performance category.

The award goes to the artist. The producer, engineer and songwriter can apply for a Winners Certificate.

Metallica holds the record for the most wins in this category, with a total of seven. Tool has received the award three times. Black Sabbath, Nine Inch Nails, Ozzy Osbourne and Slayer have each received the award twice. The band Ministry holds the record for the most nominations without a win, with six, while the band Megadeth holds the record for most nominations before their first win, winning on their 10th nomination. Poppy became the first solo female musician to receive a nomination in this category in 2021, 31 years after the establishment of the category. Marina Viotti is the first female recipient in this category, winning in 2025.

== Recipients ==
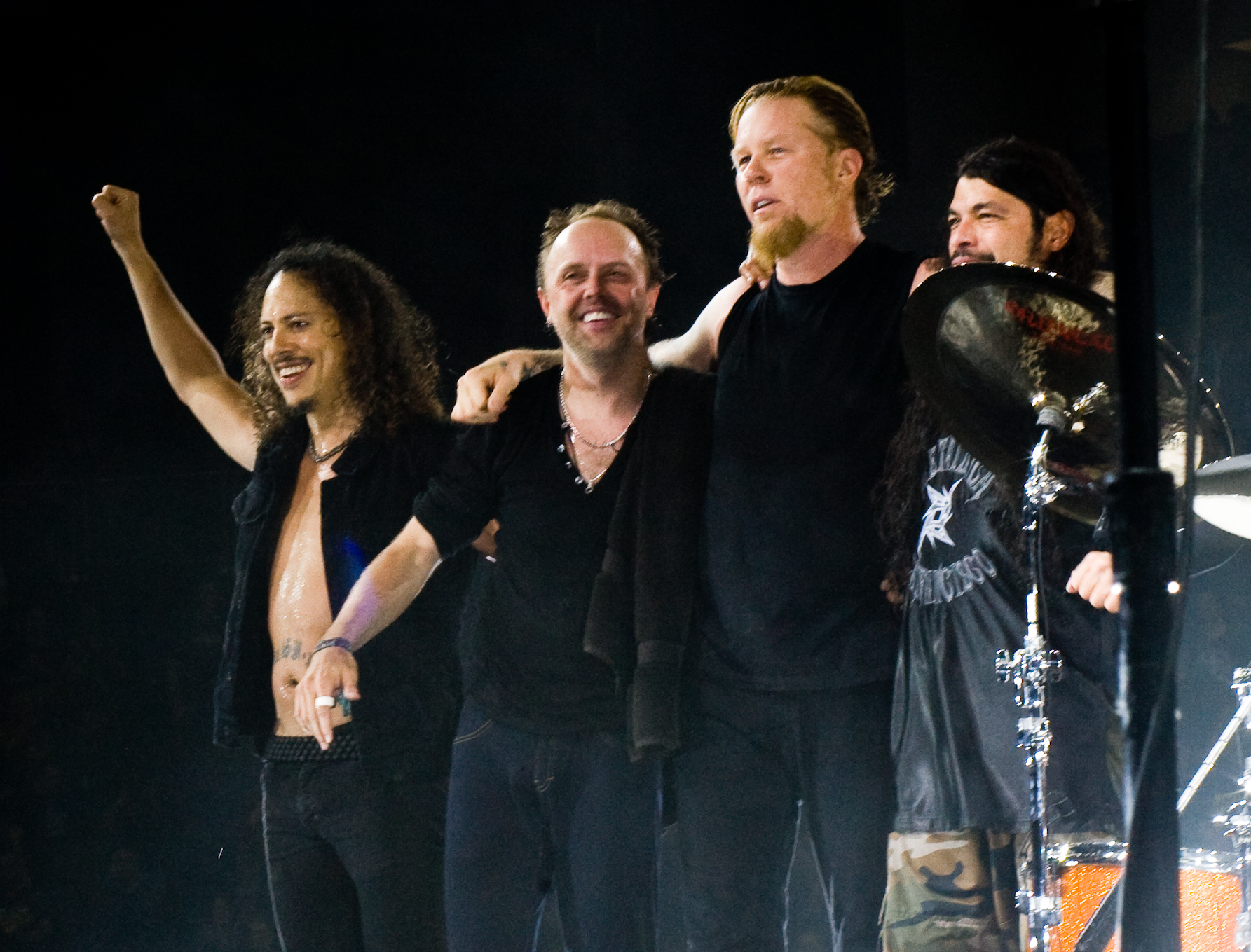
Members of the seven-time award-winning band Metallica

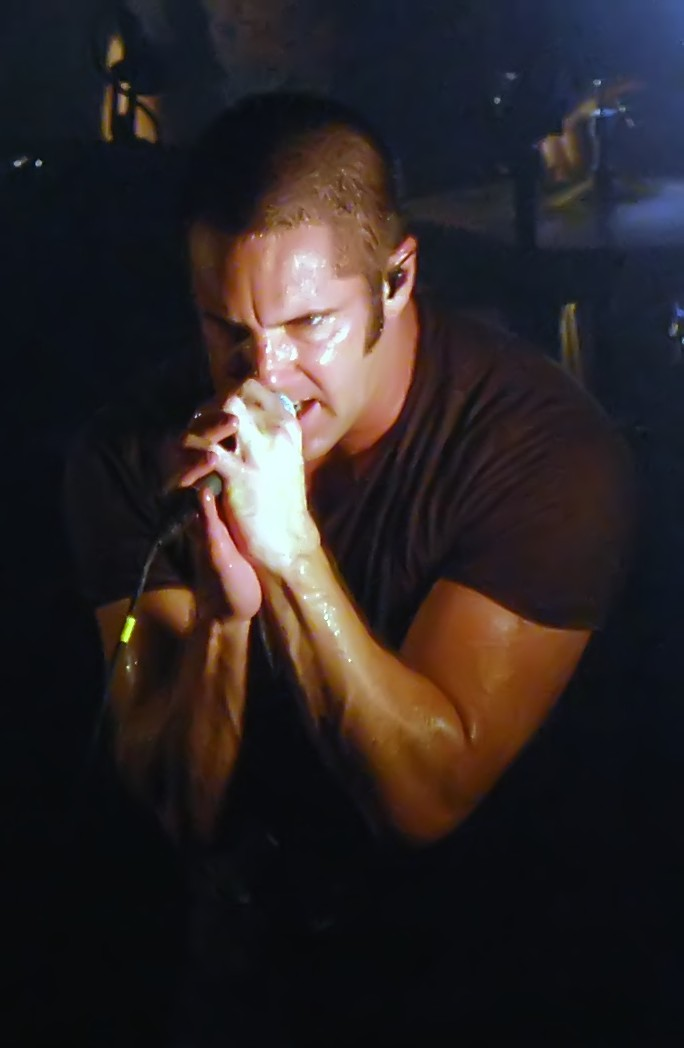
Trent Reznor of the two-time award-winning band Nine Inch Nails

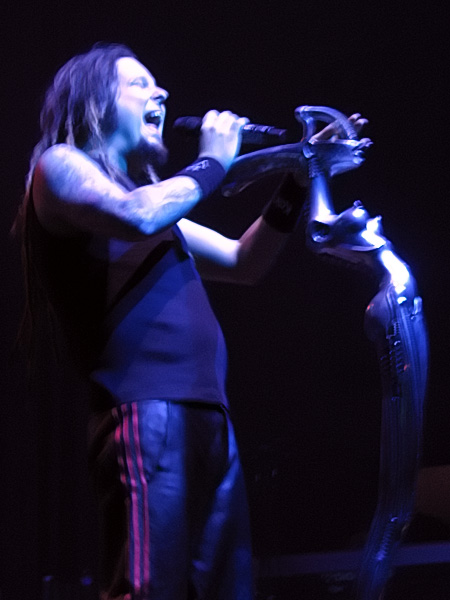
Jonathan Davis of the 2003 award-winning band Korn

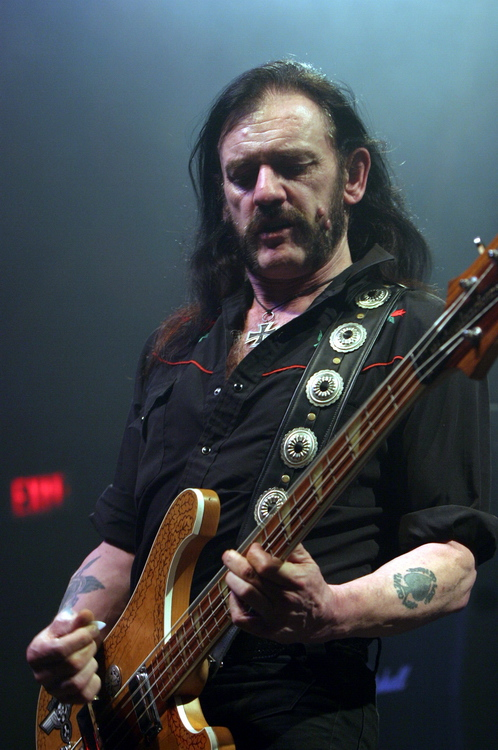
Lemmy of the 2005 award-winning band Motörhead

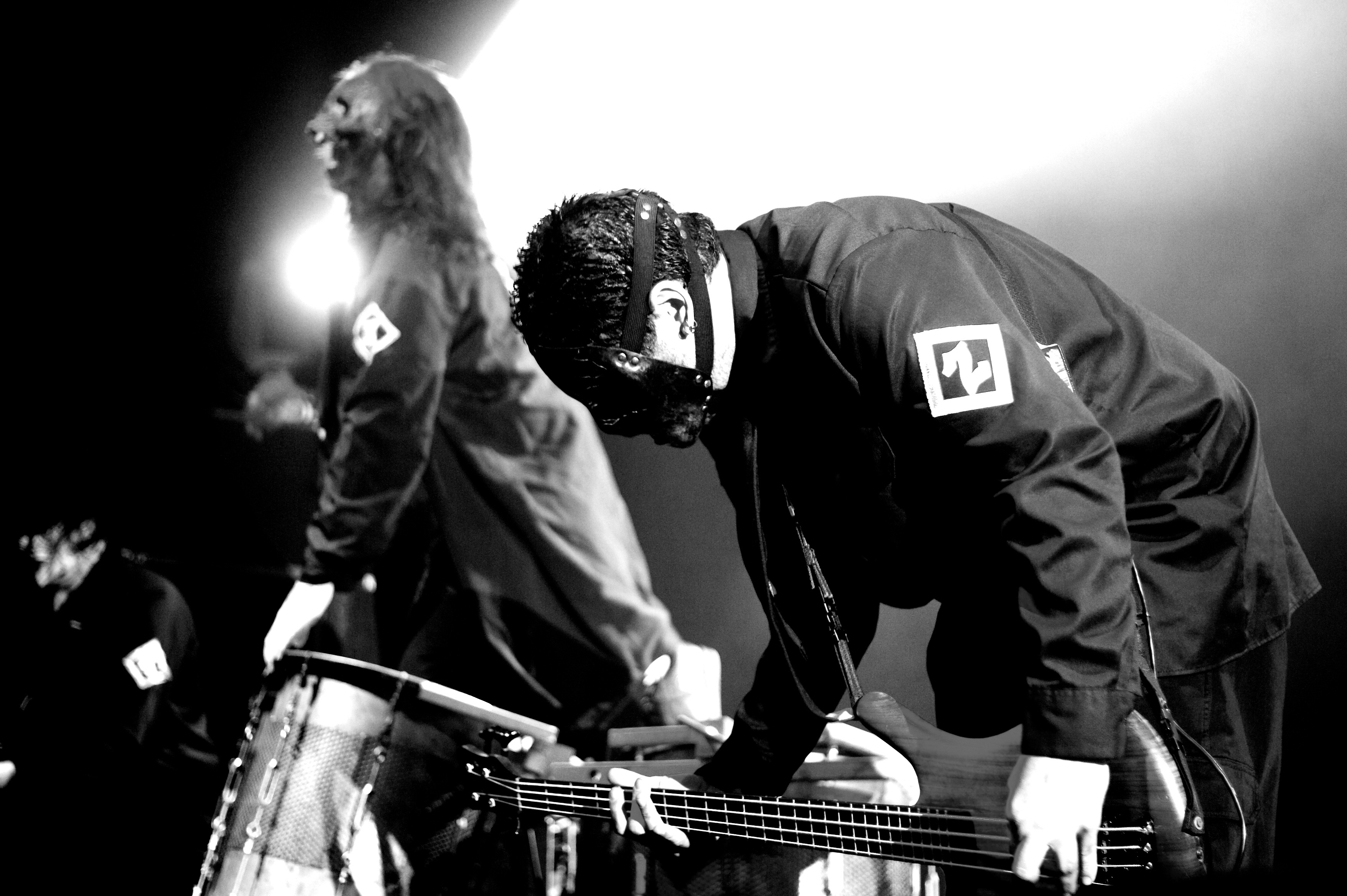
Members of the 2006 award-winning band Slipknot

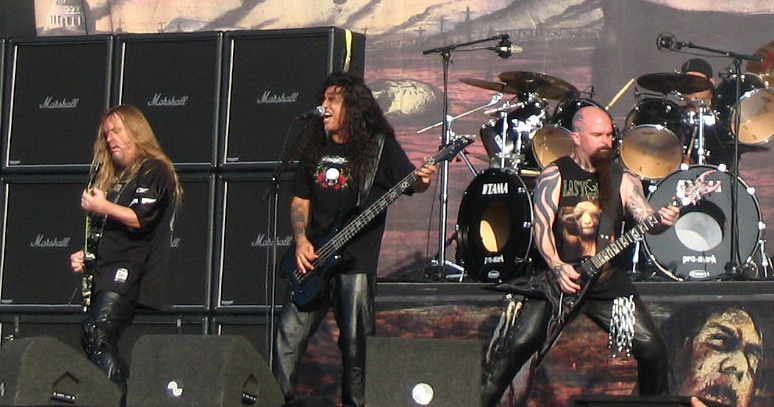
Members of the two-time award-winning band Slayer

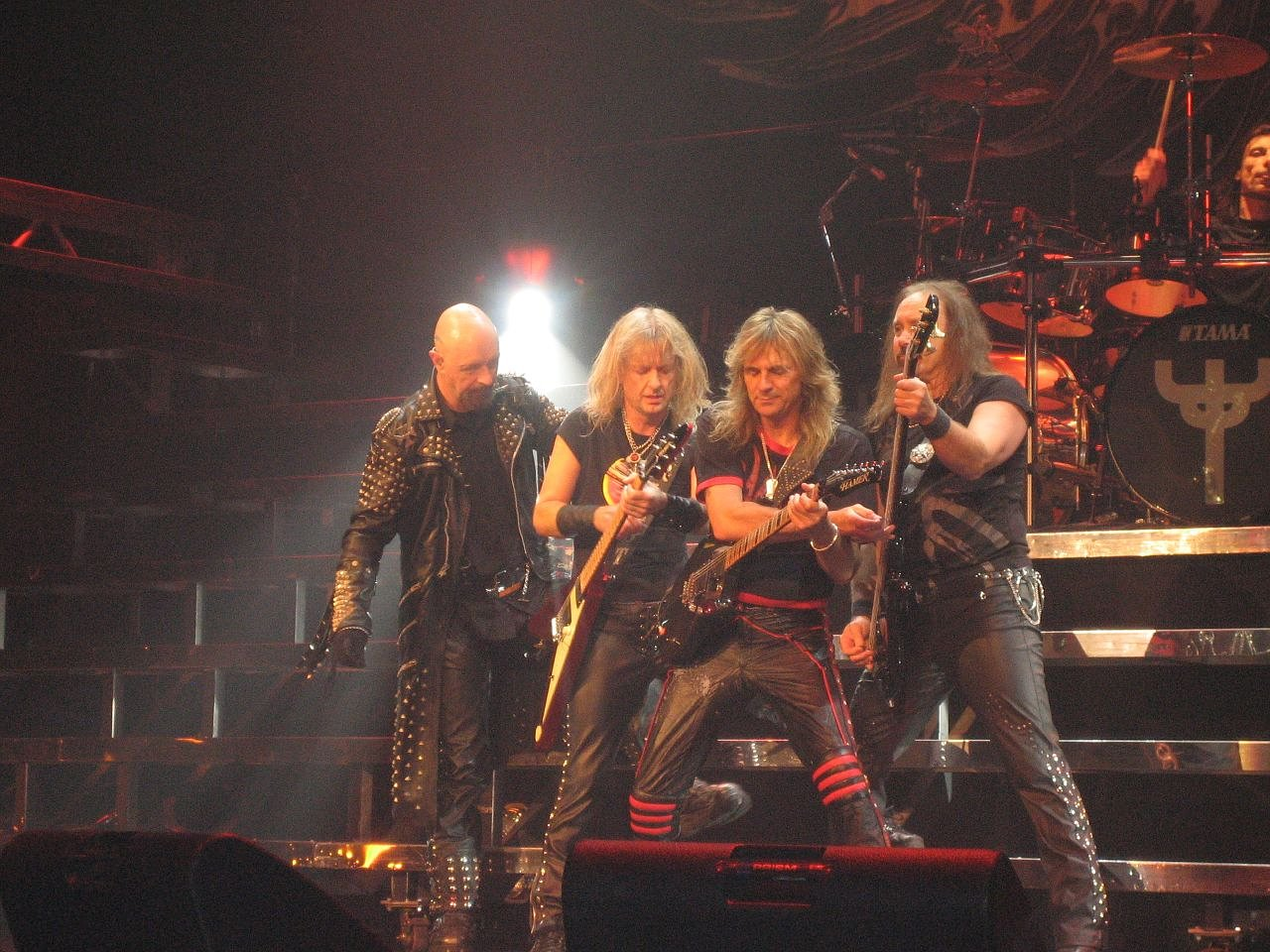
Members of the 2010 award-winning band Judas Priest

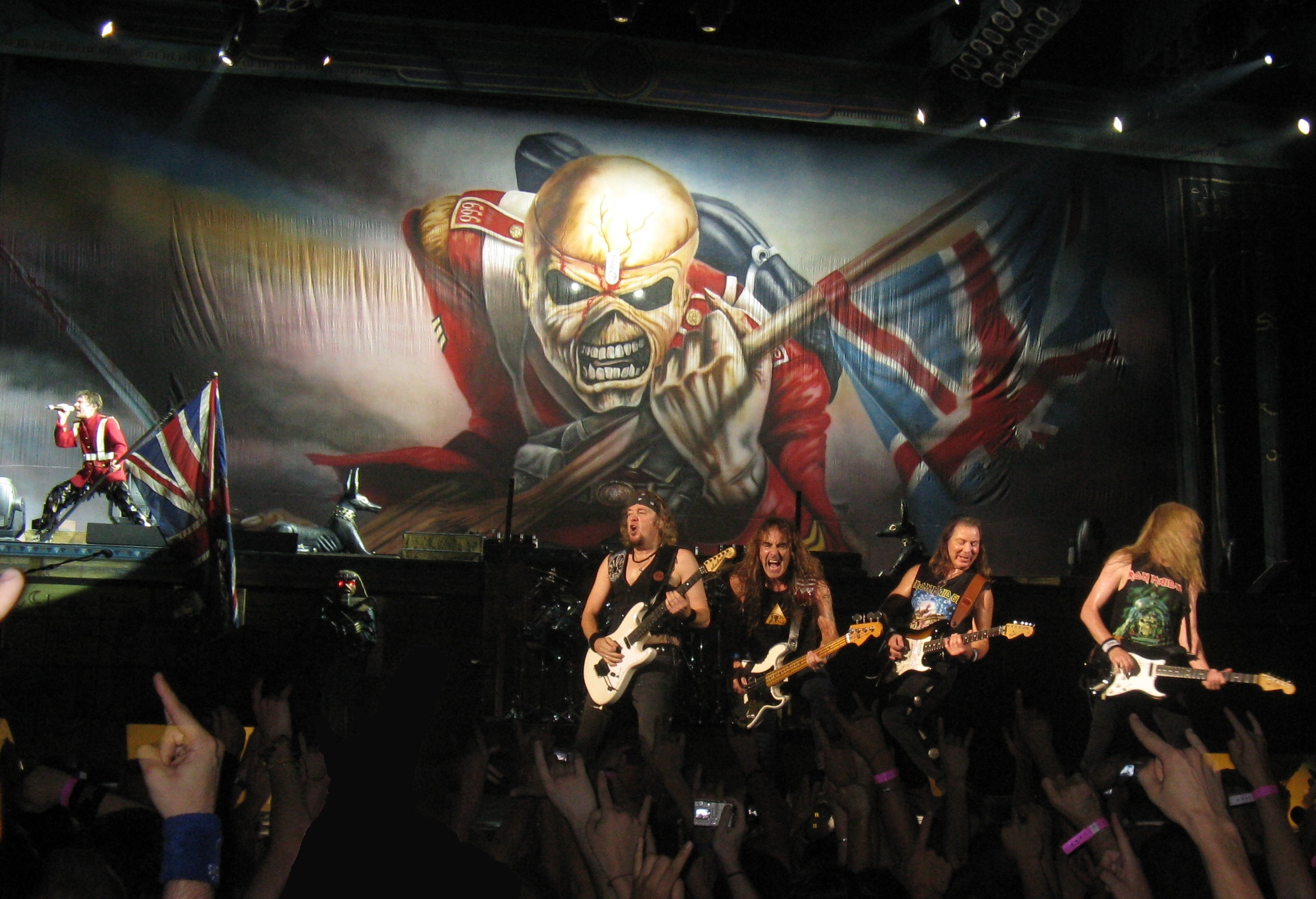
Members of the 2011 award-winning band Iron Maiden

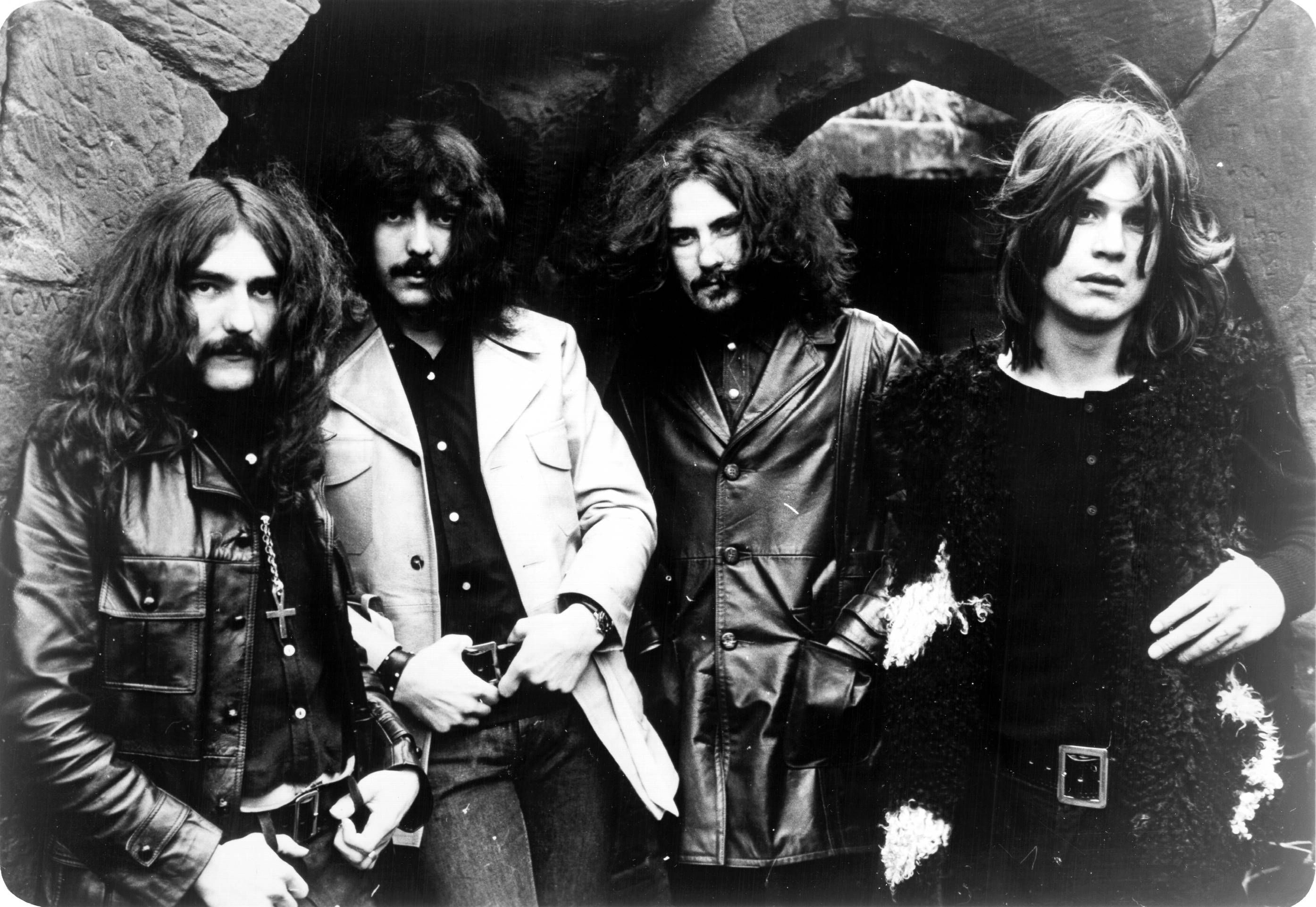
Members of the two-time award-winning band Black Sabbath, including two-time award winner Ozzy Osbourne (right)

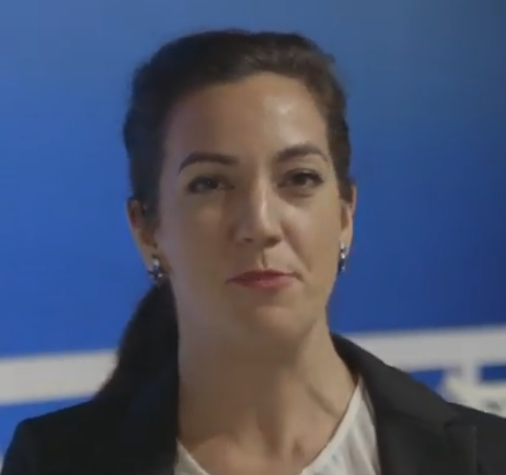
Marina Viotti is the first female recipient of this award, winning in 2025.

=== 1990s ===
Year	Artist	Work
1990
1990	Metallica	"One"
1990	Dokken	Beast from the East
1990	Faith No More	The Real Thing
1990	Queensrÿche	"I Don't Believe in Love"
1990	Soundgarden	Ultramega OK
1991
1991	Metallica	"Stone Cold Crazy"
1991	Anthrax	Persistence of Time
1991	Judas Priest	Painkiller
1991	Megadeth	Rust in Peace
1991	Suicidal Tendencies	Lights...Camera...Revolution!
1992
1992	Metallica	Metallica
1992	Anthrax	Attack of the Killer B's
1992	Megadeth	"Hangar 18"
1992	Motörhead	1916
1992	Soundgarden	Badmotorfinger
1993
1993	Nine Inch Nails	"Wish"
1993	Helmet	"In the Meantime"
1993	Megadeth	Countdown to Extinction
1993	Ministry	"N.W.O."
1993	Soundgarden	"Into the Void (Sealth)"
1994
1994	Ozzy Osbourne	"I Don't Want to Change the World" (Live)
1994	Iron Maiden	"Fear of the Dark" (Live)
1994	Megadeth	"Angry Again"
1994	Suicidal Tendencies	"Institutionalized"
1994	White Zombie	"Thunder Kiss '65"
1995
1995	Soundgarden	"Spoonman"
1995	Anthrax and Public Enemy	"Bring the Noise" (Live)
1995	Megadeth	"99 Ways to Die"
1995	Pantera	"I'm Broken"
1995	Rollins Band	"Liar"
1996
1996	Nine Inch Nails	"Happiness in Slavery" (Live)
1996	Gwar	"S.F.W."
1996	Megadeth	"Paranoid"
1996	Metallica	"For Whom the Bell Tolls" (Live)
1996	White Zombie	"More Human than Human"
1997
1997	Rage Against the Machine	"Tire Me"
1997	Alice Cooper and Rob Zombie	"Hands of Death (Burn Baby Burn)"
1997	Korn	"Shoots and Ladders"
1997	Pantera	"Suicide Note, Pt. I"
1997	White Zombie	"I'm Your Boogie Man"
1998
1998	Tool	"Ænema"
1998	Corrosion of Conformity	"Drowning in a Daydream"
1998	Korn	"No Place to Hide"
1998	Megadeth	"Trust"
1998	Pantera	"Cemetery Gates" (Live)
1999
1999	Metallica	"Better than You"
1999	Judas Priest	"Bullet Train"
1999	Nashville Pussy	"Fried Chicken and Coffee"
1999	Rage Against the Machine	"No Shelter"
1999	Rammstein	"Du hast"

=== 2000s ===
Year	Artist	Work
2000
2000	Black Sabbath	"Iron Man" (Live)
2000	Ministry	"Bad Blood"
2000	Motörhead	"Enter Sandman"
2000	Nine Inch Nails	"Starfuckers, Inc."
2000	Rob Zombie	"Superbeast"
2001
2001	Deftones	"Elite"
2001	Iron Maiden	"The Wicker Man"
2001	Marilyn Manson	"Astonishing Panorama of the Endtimes"
2001	Pantera	"Revolution Is My Name"
2001	Slipknot	"Wait and Bleed"
2002
2002	Tool	"Schism"
2002	Black Sabbath	"The Wizard" (Live)
2002	Slayer	"Disciple"
2002	Slipknot	"Left Behind"
2002	System of a Down	"Chop Suey!"
2003
2003	Korn	"Here to Stay"
2003	P.O.D.	"Portrait"
2003	Slipknot	"My Plague"
2003	Stone Sour	"Get Inside"
2003	Rob Zombie	"Never Gonna Stop (The Red Red Kroovy)"
2004
2004	Metallica	"St. Anger"
2004	Korn	"Did My Time"
2004	Marilyn Manson	"Mobscene"
2004	Spineshank	"Smothered"
2004	Stone Sour	"Inhale"
2005
2005	Motörhead	"Whiplash"
2005	Cradle of Filth	"Nymphetamine (Overdose)"
2005	Hatebreed	"Live for This"
2005	Killswitch Engage	"The End of Heartache"
2005	Slipknot	"Vermilion"
2006
2006	Slipknot	"Before I Forget"
2006	Ministry	"The Great Satan (Remix)"
2006	Mudvayne	"Determined"
2006	Rammstein	"Mein Teil"
2006	Shadows Fall	"What Drives the Weak"
2007
2007	Slayer	"Eyes of the Insane"
2007	Lamb of God	"Redneck"
2007	Mastodon	"Colony of Birchmen"
2007	Ministry	"LiesLiesLies"
2007	Stone Sour	"30/30-150"
2008
2008	Slayer	"Final Six"
2008	As I Lay Dying	"Nothing Left"
2008	King Diamond	"Never Ending Hill"
2008	Machine Head	"Aesthetics of Hate"
2008	Shadows Fall	"Redemption"
2009
2009	Metallica	"My Apocalypse"
2009	DragonForce	"Heroes of Our Time"
2009	Judas Priest	"Nostradamus"
2009	Ministry	"Under My Thumb"
2009	Slipknot	"Psychosocial"

=== 2010s ===
Year	Artist	Work
2010
2010	Judas Priest	"Dissident Aggressor" (Live)
2010	Lamb of God	"Set to Fail"
2010	Megadeth	"Head Crusher"
2010	Ministry	"Señor Peligro" (Live)
2010	Slayer	"Hate Worldwide"
2011
2011	Iron Maiden	"El Dorado"
2011	Korn	"Let the Guilt Go"
2011	Lamb of God	"In Your Words"
2011	Megadeth	"Sudden Death"
2011	Slayer	"World Painted Blood"
2014
2014	Black Sabbath	"God Is Dead?"
2014	Anthrax	"T.N.T."
2014	Dream Theater	"The Enemy Inside"
2014	Killswitch Engage	"In Due Time"
2014	Volbeat featuring King Diamond	"Room 24"
2015
2015	Tenacious D	"The Last in Line"
2015	Anthrax	"Neon Knights"
2015	Mastodon	"High Road"
2015	Motörhead	"Heartbreaker"
2015	Slipknot	"The Negative One"
2016
2016	Ghost	"Cirice"
2016	August Burns Red	"Identity"
2016	Lamb of God	"512"
2016	Sevendust	"Thank You"
2016	Slipknot	"Custer"
2017
2017	Megadeth	"Dystopia"
2017	Baroness	"Shock Me"
2017	Gojira	"Silvera"
2017	Korn	"Rotting in Vain"
2017	Periphery	"The Price Is Wrong"
2018
2018	Mastodon	"Sultan's Curse"
2018	August Burns Red	"Invisible Enemy"
2018	Body Count	"Black Hoodie"
2018	Code Orange	"Forever"
2018	Meshuggah	"Clockworks"
2019
2019	High on Fire	"Electric Messiah"
2019	Between the Buried and Me	"Condemned to the Gallows"
2019	Deafheaven	"Honeycomb"
2019	Trivium	"Betrayer"
2019	Underoath	"On My Teeth"

=== 2020s ===
Year	Artist	Work
2020
2020	Tool	"7empest"
2020	Candlemass featuring Tony Iommi	"Astorolus - The Great Octopus"
2020	Death Angel	"Humanicide"
2020	I Prevail	"Bow Down"
2020	Killswitch Engage	"Unleashed"
2021
2021	Body Count	"Bum-Rush"
2021	Code Orange	"Underneath"
2021	In This Moment	"The In-Between"
2021	Poppy	"Bloodmoney"
2021	Power Trip	"Executioner's Tax (Swing of the Axe)" (Live)
2022
2022	Dream Theater	"The Alien"
2022	Deftones	"Genesis"
2022	Gojira	"Amazonia"
2022	Mastodon	"Pushing the Tides"
2022	Rob Zombie	"The Triumph of King Freak (A Crypt of Preservation and Superstition)"
2023
2023	Ozzy Osbourne featuring Tony Iommi	"Degradation Rules"
2023	Ghost	"Call Me Little Sunshine"
2023	Megadeth	"We'll Be Back"
2023	Muse	"Kill or Be Killed"
2023	Turnstile	"Blackout"
2024
2024	Metallica	"72 Seasons"
2024	Disturbed	"Bad Man"
2024	Ghost	"Phantom of the Opera"
2024	Slipknot	"Hive Mind"
2024	Spiritbox	"Jaded"
2025
2025	Gojira, Marina Viotti and Victor Le Masne	"Mea Culpa (Ah! Ça ira!)"
2025	Judas Priest	"Crown of Horns"
2025	Knocked Loose featuring Poppy	"Suffocate"
2025	Metallica	"Screaming Suicide"
2025	Spiritbox	"Cellar Door"
2026
2026	Turnstile	"Birds"
2026	Dream Theater	"Night Terror"
2026	Ghost	"Lachryma"
2026	Sleep Token	"Emergence"
2026	Spiritbox	"Soft Spine"
2027
2027	Anthrax	"The Edge of Perfection"
2027	Knocked Loose featuring Denzel Curry	"Hive Mind"
2027	Mastodon	"Your Ghost Again"
2027	Megadeth	"Let There Be Shred"
2027	Poppy, Amy Lee and Courtney LaPlante	"End of You"

^{^[I]} Each year is linked to the article about the Grammy Awards held that year.

== Multiple wins ==
7 wins

- Metallica

3 wins

- Tool

2 wins

- Black Sabbath
- Nine Inch Nails
- Ozzy Osbourne
- Slayer

== Multiple nominations ==
12 nominations

- Megadeth

9 nominations

- Metallica
- Slipknot

6 nominations

- Anthrax
- Korn
- Ministry

5 nominations

- Judas Priest
- Mastodon
- Slayer

4 nominations

- Ghost
- Lamb of God
- Motörhead
- Pantera
- Soundgarden
- Rob Zombie

3 nominations

- Black Sabbath
- Dream Theater
- Gojira
- Iron Maiden
- Killswitch Engage
- Nine Inch Nails
- Poppy
- Spiritbox
- Stone Sour
- Tool
- White Zombie

2 nominations

- August Burns Red
- Body Count
- Code Orange
- Deftones
- King Diamond
- Knocked Loose
- Marilyn Manson
- Ozzy Osbourne
- Rage Against the Machine
- Rammstein
- Shadows Fall
- Suicidal Tendencies
- Turnstile

== See also ==
- List of Grammy Award categories
