= Renée Auphan =

French singer

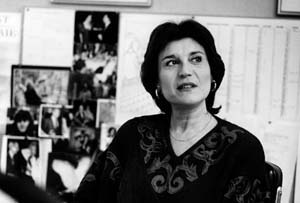
Renée Auphan in 1988

Renée Auphan (born 2 June 1941) is a Franco-Swiss singer and director of opera.

== Life ==
Born in Marseille, Auphan studied singing at the Monte-Carlo Conservatory. She worked at the Opéra de Marseille and Opéra de Monte-Carlo as an assistant director, stage manager and artistic administrator. She received the first prize for singing (soprano) at the Rainier-III Academy of Music. In 1983, she was appointed director of the Opéra de Lausanne which she directed from October 1984 to June 1995 and then of the Grand Théâtre de Genève until 2001.

Auphan was appointed at the head of the Opéra de Marseille where she began her career as an assistant director at the opera house. On 1 January 2002, she officially succeeded Jean-Louis Pujol, whose contract, which expired at the end of April 2001, was not renewed.

A chevalier of the Legion of Honour, Auphan received the prize of the Société de Belles-Lettres in 1993.

In April 2013, she staged l'Aiglon by Jacques Ibert and Arthur Honegger at the Opéra de Lausanne.
