= Forumopera.com =

French webzine

- Founder: Camille de Rijck
- President: Roselyne Bachelot
- Editor-in-chief: Sylvain Fort
- General manager: Christophe Rizoud
- Founded: 1999
- Language: French
- City: Brussels
- Country: Belgium
- OCLC number: 863048451
- Website: www.forumopera.com

Forum Opéra, which is mainly known for its website, Forumopera.com, is a French-language webzine which is dedicated to opera and bel canto since 1999.

== History of the project ==
Created in 1999 and led by its founder Camille de Rijck, Forumopera.com is the pioneer of French-language operatic portals.

In 2001, the forum became a webzine. Since then, its design has been supported by an independent editorial team that has worked to put thematic dossiers, reviews of shows, records, podcasts and video interviews online.

Since 2004, the editorial team has been led by Christophe Rizoud. A large team is still working on the site. Its structure includes around thirty publishers—including Sylvain Fort of Classica and Roselyne Bachelot—who are located in several European countries.

In 2014, Forumopera.com used crowdfunding to set up a new version of its website. The resulting update—allowing readers to comment on published articles—accelerated the development of the webzine, which has since become an essential reference in the field of opera.

Forumopera.com receives about 150,000 visitors per month with 350,000 page views. This figure has been steadily increasing since 2011.
