= List of Ozzy Osbourne members =

Members of the solo band of Black Sabbath singer Ozzy Osbourne

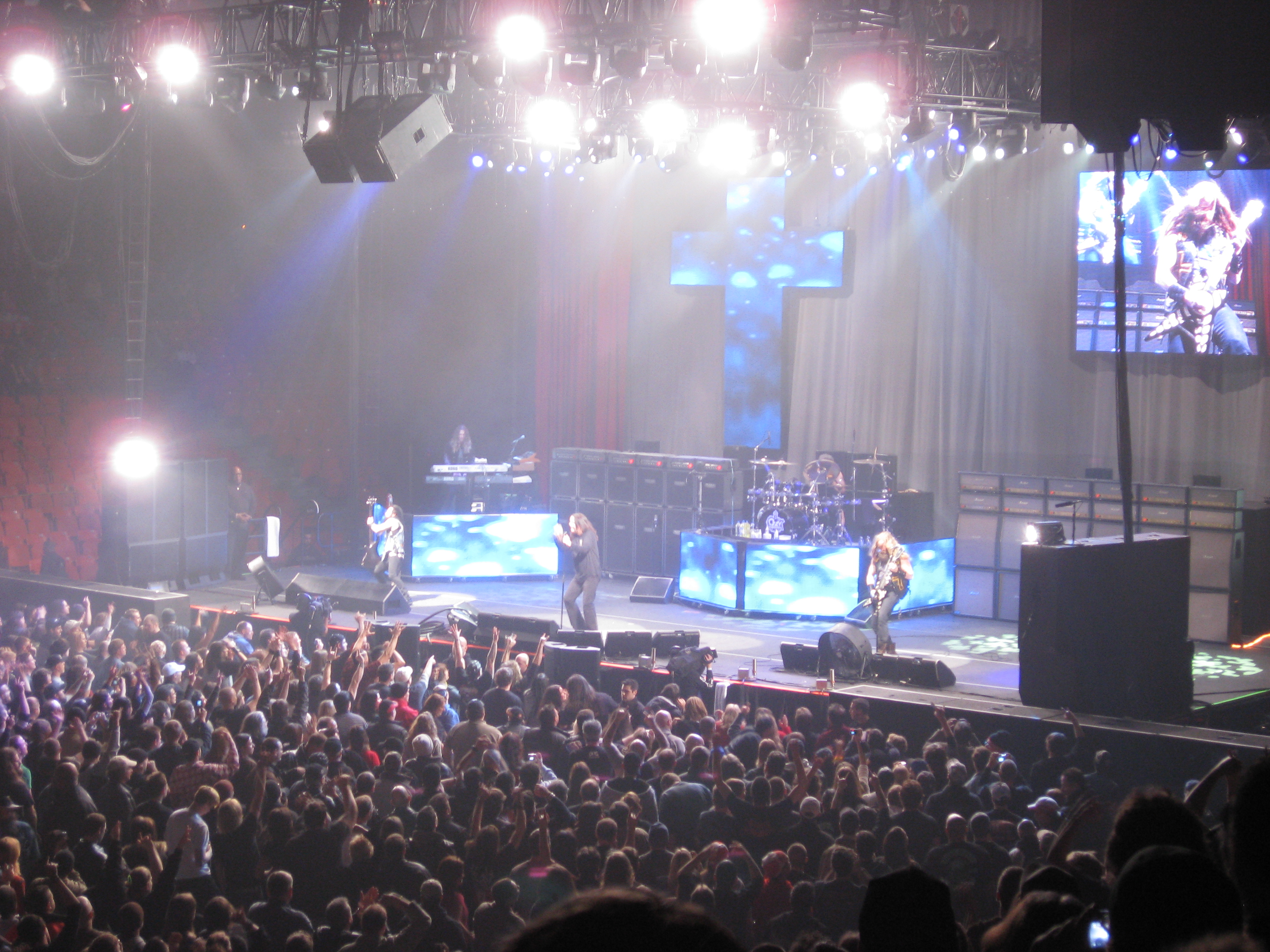
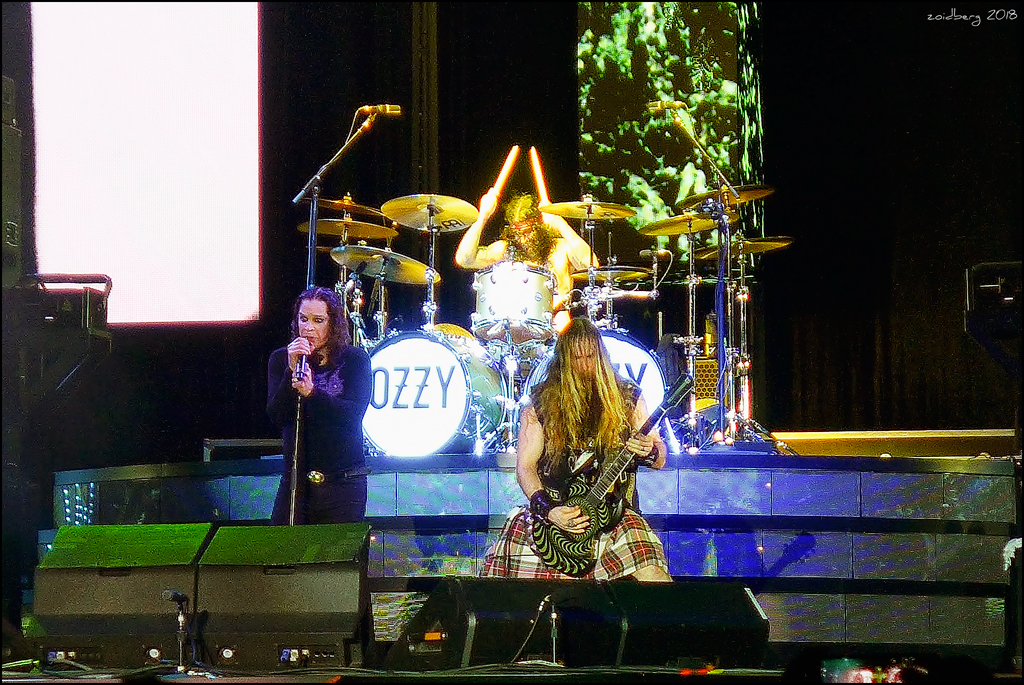
Current and former members of Ozzy Osbourne's solo band performing live in 2009 (top) and 2018 (bottom)

Ozzy Osbourne was an English heavy metal vocalist from Aston, Birmingham. After he was fired from Black Sabbath early in 1979, Osbourne formed a solo band (initially known as Blizzard of Ozz) in November of that year with guitarist Randy Rhoads, bassist Bob Daisley and drummer Lee Kerslake. Since its inception, the group's personnel have changed frequently. The final lineup included guitarist Zakk Wylde (who first joined in 1987 until 1992, spent a second tenure in the band from 2001 and 2009, and then rejoined in 2017), bassist Mike Inez (who first joined in 1989 until 1992, had touring tenures in 1996 and 1998, and returned in 2025), keyboardist and rhythm guitarist Adam Wakeman (who first joined as a touring musician in 2004, and was made an official member with the release of Scream in 2010), and drummer Tommy Clufetos (since 2010).

Until 2020 Osbourne's current touring band always performed on the albums. From Ordinary Man onwards his albums instead featured an array of session and guest musicians with minimal or no contributions from his touring band.

== History ==
=== 1979–1982 ===
Ozzy Osbourne was fired from Black Sabbath on 27 April 1979, primarily due to his problems with alcohol and drug abuse. The vocalist subsequently rehearsed with a range of musicians in an attempt to form his own band, including guitarists Gary Moore of Thin Lizzy and George Lynch of Dokken, bassist Dana Strum, and drummers Dixie Lee of Lone Star and Dave Potts of Praying Mantis. By November 1979, he had settled on a supergroup lineup including former Quiet Riot guitarist Randy Rhoads, former Rainbow bassist and backing vocalist Bob Daisley, and former Uriah Heep drummer Lee Kerslake.

The new band released their debut album Blizzard of Ozz in September 1980, which also featured keyboard contributions from Don Airey. For the album's promotional tour, this role was handled by Lindsay Bridgwater. After the recording of Diary of a Madman, on which Johnny Cook performed uncredited keyboards, both Daisley and Kerslake were fired; Osbourne has blamed the pair's dismissal on creative differences, while his wife Sharon has cited financial disputes. They were replaced by Rudy Sarzo (a former member of Quiet Riot with Rhoads) and Tommy Aldridge, respectively, who were both credited on the Diary of a Madman album sleeve, despite having not performed on it. After the end of the Blizzard of Ozz touring cycle, Diary of a Madman was released in November 1981.

The Diary of a Madman Tour commenced in December, with Don Airey in place of Bridgwater on keyboards. On 19 March 1982, however, the tour came to an abrupt halt when Rhoads was killed in a plane crash in Leesburg, Florida. The incident occurred when tour bus driver Andrew Aycock took the aircraft out for a joyride and repeatedly flew close to the bus, eventually clipping it and crashing into a building. After a two-week break, Sarzo's brother Robert was chosen as the replacement for Rhoads, although Osbourne's label Jet Records had already promised the position to Bernie Tormé, who joined thereafter.

Tormé debuted with the band on 1 April 1982 in Bethlehem, Pennsylvania. However, after just seven shows he had left again, in part to focus on his solo career but also due to the "horrible ... bad atmosphere" that was present in the wake of Rhoads's death. On 13 April, Night Ranger guitarist Brad Gillis took over from Tormé, remaining for the rest of the tour. Osbourne was contractually obliged by CBS Records to produce a live album before the end of the year, which came in the form of Speak of the Devil, a collection of Black Sabbath covers. After the tour's conclusion in September, Sarzo left Osbourne's band.

=== 1982–1992 ===
For the first leg of the Speak of the Devil Tour in December 1982, Osbourne and his band performed with UFO bassist Pete Way. After Gillis left to return to Night Ranger, the position of guitarist was filled at the end of the year by Jake E. Lee, formerly of Ratt and Rough Cutt. George Lynch, who had previously auditioned for the band in 1979, was initially given the role by Osbourne, but was then immediately fired when Lee was brought in. Don Costa took over from Way for the remainder of the tour, before Bob Daisley returned in time to perform at the US Festival in May. After the recording of Bark at the Moon, Tommy Aldridge was replaced by Carmine Appice, although by early 1984 he had returned due to personal differences and tensions between Osbourne and the new drummer. By the time the Bark at the Moon Tour had finished in January 1985, Aldridge had decided to leave the band again, having not fully enjoyed the role since Rhoads's death.

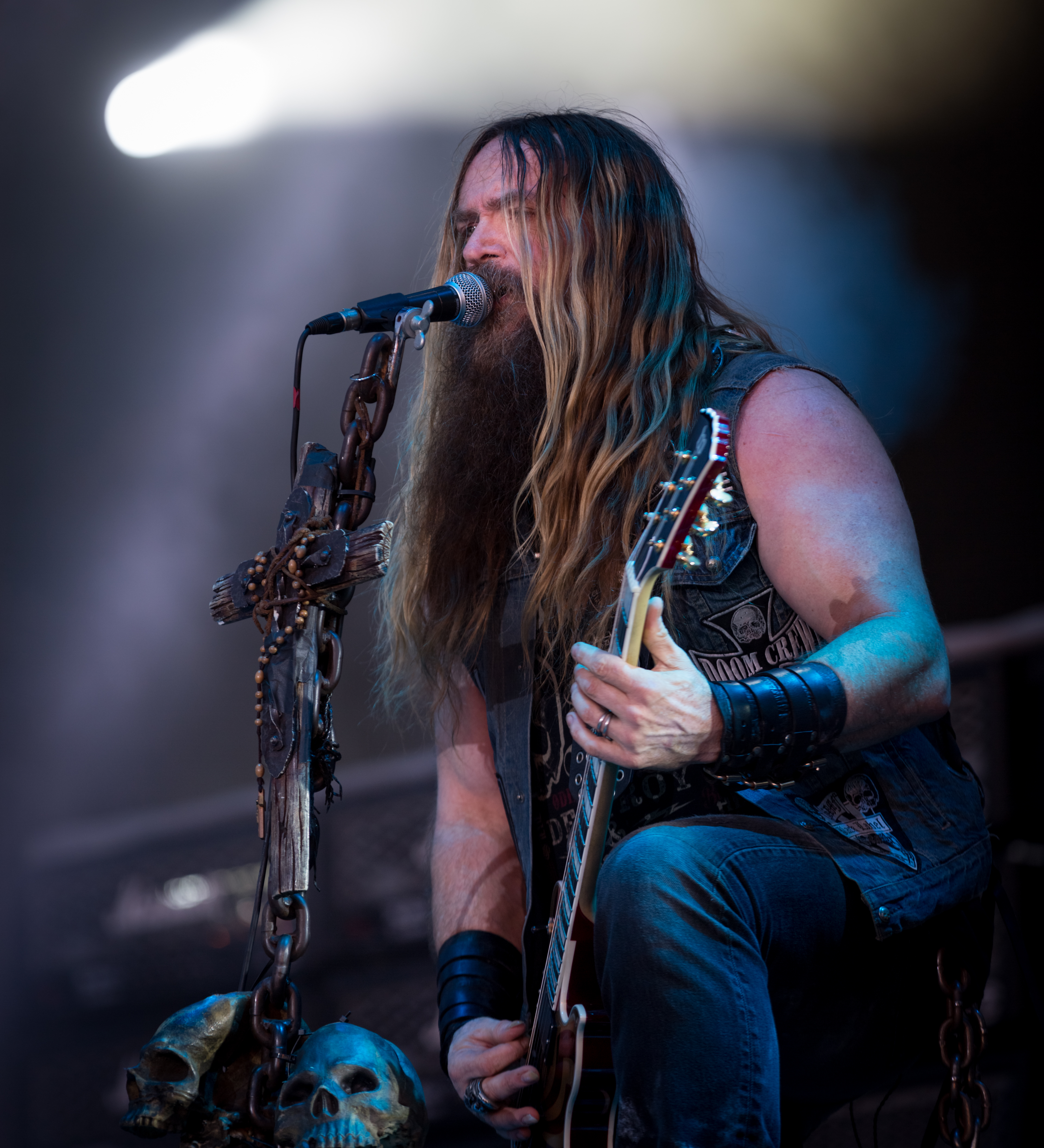
Zakk Wylde took over from Jake E. Lee in 1987, performing on No Rest for the Wicked and No More Tears. He would later rejoin in 2001 and again in 2017.

Lee and Daisley commenced work on the next Ozzy Osbourne album The Ultimate Sin without the eponymous vocalist, who had been admitted to a drug and alcohol rehabilitation centre. Drums were handled initially by Fred Coury and later Jimmy DeGrasso, however the sessions were later scrapped and both Daisley and DeGrasso left the group. By the time recording restarted in the summer, the group consisted of Osbourne, Lee, bassist Phil Soussan and former Lita Ford drummer Randy Castillo. Keyboards on the album were performed by Mike Moran. For the subsequent promotional tour, John Sinclair took over as the band's backup keyboardist.

Osbourne and Lee parted ways after the conclusion of The Ultimate Sin Tour, reportedly on "amiable" terms. After various guitarists sent in demo tapes and auditioned for the vacated role, Zakk Wylde (then using the moniker "Zack Wylant") was chosen as Lee's replacement, debuting at a private show at Wormwood Scrubs Prison in July. Soussan left shortly thereafter due to disagreements over songwriting credits, with Bob Daisley returning to record bass on No Rest for the Wicked. In May 1988, it was announced that former Black Sabbath bassist Geezer Butler would join the lineup of Osbourne's band for the No Rest for the Wicked Tour later that year.

After the tour, the group began working on new material with bassist Terry Nails, although before the end of 1989 he was replaced by Mike Inez. The new bassist, however, was later replaced for the recording by Bob Daisley, who claimed that Inez's parts were not "sounding and feeling how Ozzy wanted" them to. Inez remained the group's official bassist and was credited with "bass and music inspiration" on the sleeve of the resulting album, No More Tears. For the subsequent Theatre of Madness Tour, Kevin Jones took over from Sinclair, who was then touring with the Cult. Osbourne later announced that he intended to retire from music, embarking on the No More Tours Tour in 1992. The final shows took place in November and featured reunions with former Black Sabbath bandmates Tony Iommi, Geezer Butler and Bill Ward.

=== 1994–2003 ===
Despite describing his retirement as "absolutely for real", Osbourne returned to his music career just two years later, claiming that "Retirement sucked. It wasn't too long before I started getting antsy and writing songs again." In the meantime, Inez had joined Alice in Chains and Wylde had formed Pride & Glory, meaning the singer had to recruit a new band – in 1994, he began rehearsing with Bob Daisley, former David Lee Roth and Whitesnake guitarist Steve Vai, and former Hardline drummer Deen Castronovo. This lineup fell apart early the next year, with Zakk Wylde and Geezer Butler brought in to replace Vai and Daisley on the Ozzmosis album.

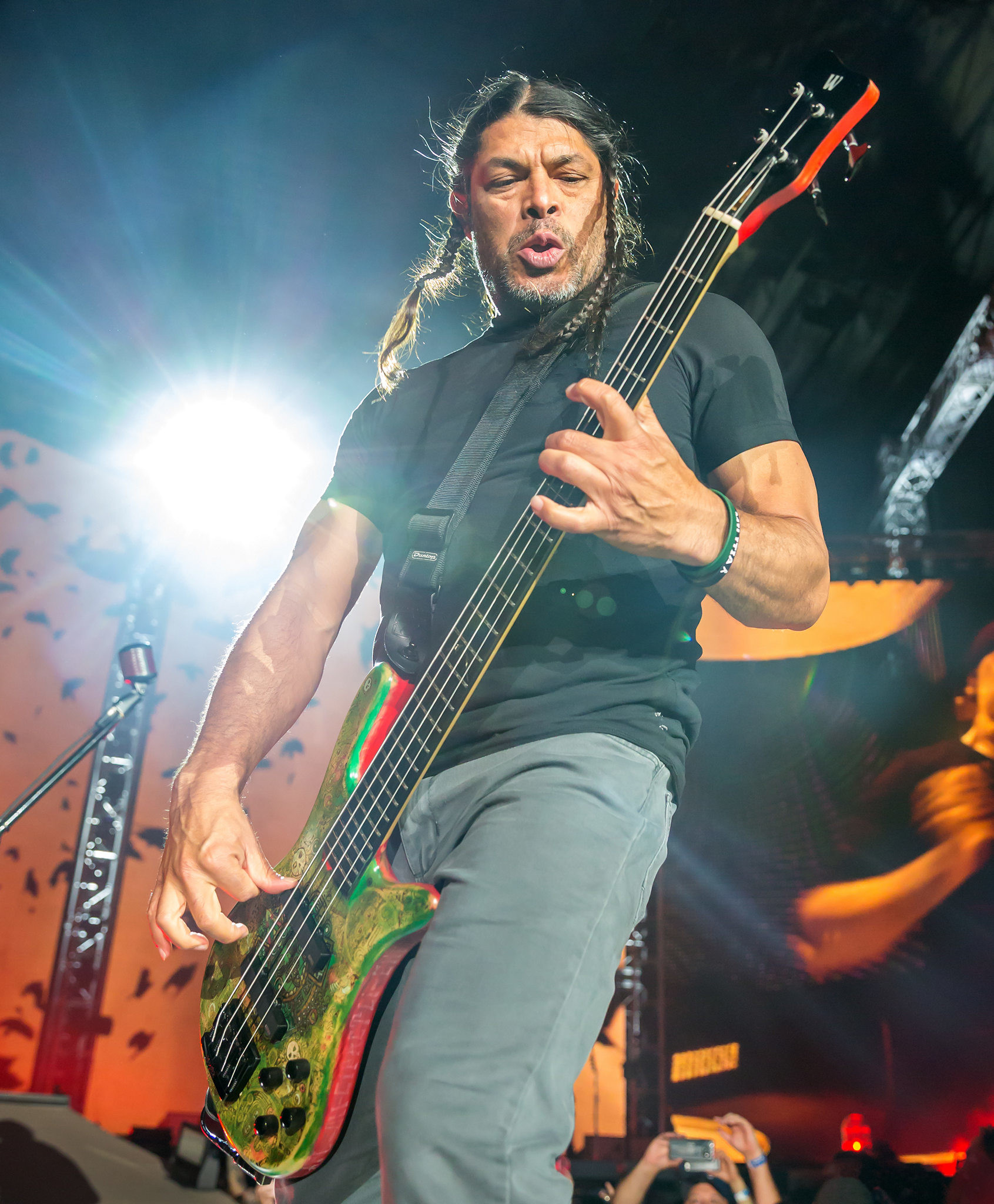
Bassist Robert Trujillo was a mainstay of the Ozzy Osbourne band lineup during the late 1990s and early 2000s, remaining until he joined Metallica in 2003.

Osbourne's first show after returning took place in Nottingham, England in June 1995 and featured former Testament guitarist Alex Skolnick as part of the lineup. However, a few weeks later, he was informed that he would not be joining the band. The role was instead given to Joe Holmes, another former David Lee Roth band member, who began rehearsing with the group in July. The Retirement Sucks Tour commenced in August with a string of South American shows as part of Monsters of Rock, after which Castronovo was fired due to differences with Osbourne, and replaced by the returning Randy Castillo. Another change in personnel came in January 1996, when Butler left the tour due to homesickness, with Osbourne enlisting former bassist Mike Inez to take his place for the rest of the shows.

By March 1996, Inez and Castillo had been replaced by Robert Trujillo (formerly of Suicidal Tendencies and Infectious Grooves) and Mike Bordin (of Faith No More). During the build-up to the following year's Ozzfest tour, it was reported that Holmes had left Osbourne's band after becoming a "born again Catholic". However, just over a month later the reports were updated to state that the guitarist had returned. In early 1998, Osbourne temporarily reunited with former members Zakk Wylde, Mike Inez and Randy Castillo for The Ozzman Cometh Tour in Australia, New Zealand and Japan. Holmes, Trujillo and Bordin remained the official members of the band, however, and began work on their first album together in 1999. Bordin spent much of 2000 filling in for the injured David Silveria in Korn.

While Bordin was unavailable, drums were handled by Roy Mayorga and later Brian Tichy. Holmes remained after the end of the 2000 Ozzfest tour to work on Osbourne's next album, co-writing three songs, but by early 2001 had been replaced by the returning Zakk Wylde. Down to Earth was released later that year, with keyboards performed by Michael Railo and producer Tim Palmer. The band's lineup remained stable for the Merry Mayhem and Down to Earth Tours, before Trujillo left to join Metallica in February 2003, following several auditions. After his last show on 14 March, he was replaced in Osbourne's band by his predecessor in Metallica, Jason Newsted. The new bassist toured with the group throughout the year, but by December had been replaced by Rob "Blasko" Nicholson.

=== 2003–2019 ===
Days after the announcement of Nicholson's addition to his band, Osbourne was injured in a quad bike crash and forced to cancel many of his 2004 tour dates. He returned for the Ozzfest tour in the summer. The shows also featured the debut of new keyboardist and rhythm guitarist Adam Wakeman, who had initially been asked to join the previous year before Osbourne's accident. Around the same time, the vocalist recorded Under Cover, an album of cover versions, with Alice in Chains guitarist Jerry Cantrell, former Cult bassist Chris Wyse and regular drummer Mike Bordin. The regular lineup remained for Black Rain, which was released in 2007. In July 2009, Osbourne parted ways with long-term guitarist Zakk Wylde, joking that his music was "beginning to sound like [Wylde's other band] Black Label Society". Wylde was replaced by Firewind guitarist Gus G, who was hired immediately after auditioning.

During Gus G's audition and first shows, Rob Zombie drummer Tommy Clufetos was asked to fill in for Bordin, who had recently reformed Faith No More. This led to him becoming a full-time member of the band, debuting on the following year's studio album Scream, which also marked the debut of Wakeman as an official member of the group. The band remained inactive for much of the next few years, as Osbourne and Clufetos performed as part of the reunited Black Sabbath on their final concert tour, which ended on 4 February 2017. Less than three months after the end of the tour, Osbourne announced that he would be reuniting with Zakk Wylde for an upcoming tour celebrating the 30th anniversary of their working relationship. This was later expanded into No More Tours II, dubbed the last worldwide tour by the vocalist, which was set to run through 2020, but was postposed and later cancelled in 2023.

=== 2020–2025, Death of Osbourne ===
After 2020's Ordinary Man Osbourne no longer used his touring band for recording sessions instead opting for an array of session and guest musicians. Ordinary Man featured 0 contributions from his touring band while Patient Number 9 featured minimal contributions from Zakk Wylde on some tracks and none from Nicholson, Wakeman and Clufetos.

Osbourne played two shows, one at the 2022 Commonwealth Games in Birmingham, alongside Black Sabbath guitarist Tony Iommi, Adam Wakeman (on bass) and Tommy Clufetos (on drums), and again at the 2022 NFL Halftime Performance, alongside Wylde, Clufetos, bassist Chris Chaney and producer Andrew Watt. In July 2025, Osbourne played a solo set at the Back to the Beginning concert, backed by Wylde, Wakeman, Clufetos and former bassist Mike Inez.

Osbourne played what ultimately became his final show, billed as "Back to the Beginning", alongside the original line-up of Black Sabbath, at Villa Park in Birmingham on 5 July 2025. Also performing a set of his solo work with his touring band. Having been rendered unable to stand from Parkinson's disease, Osbourne performed seated on a black throne.

Osbourne died at his home in Buckinghamshire on the morning of 22 July 2025, aged 76, concluding his solo career.

== Members ==
Image	Name	Years active	Instruments	Release contributions
	Ozzy Osbourne	1979–1992; 1994–2025; (died 2025)	lead vocals; harmonica	all Ozzy Osbourne releases
	Randy Rhoads	1979–1982 (until his death)	guitar	Blizzard of Ozz (1980); Mr Crowley Live EP (1980); Diary of a Madman (1981); Tribute (1987); Ozzy Live (2012)
	Bob Daisley	1979–1981; 1983–1985; 1987–1988 (session only); 1990–1991 (session only); 1994–1995	bass; backing vocals; percussion (studio only)	all Ozzy Osbourne releases from Blizzard of Ozz to Bark at the Moon (1983) except Speak of the Devil (1982); Tribute (1987) – two tracks only; No Rest for the Wicked (1988); No More Tears (1991)
	Lee Kerslake	1979–1981 (died 2020)	drums; percussion	Blizzard of Ozz (1980); Mr Crowley Live EP (1980); Diary of a Madman (1981); Tribute (1987) – two tracks only
	Tommy Aldridge	1981–1983; 1984–1985	drums	Speak of the Devil (1982); Bark at the Moon (1983); Tribute (1987); Ozzy Live (2012)
	Rudy Sarzo	1981–1982	bass	Speak of the Devil (1982); Tribute (1987); Ozzy Live (2012)
	Bernie Tormé	1982 (died 2019)	guitar	none – live performances only
	Brad Gillis	1982	guitar	Speak of the Devil (1982)
	Pete Way	1982 (died 2020)	bass	none – live performances only
	Jake E. Lee	1982–1987	guitar; backing vocals	Bark at the Moon (1983); The Ultimate Sin (1986); Ultimate Live Ozzy (1986)
	Don Costa	1983 (died 2024)	bass	none – live performances only
	Carmine Appice	1983–1984	drums	none – live performances only
	Don Airey	1983–1985 (session only 1980, touring only 1981–1982)	keyboards	Blizzard of Ozz (1980); Bark at the Moon (1983)
	Randy Castillo	1985–1992; 1995–1996; 1998 (touring) (died 2002)	drums	all Ozzy Osbourne releases from The Ultimate Sin (1986) to Live & Loud (1993), except Tribute (1987)
	Phil Soussan	1985–1987	bass	The Ultimate Sin (1986); Ultimate Live Ozzy (1986)
	Zakk Wylde	1987–1992; 1995 (session); 1998 (touring); 2001–2009; 2017–2025	guitar; piano; backing vocals; keyboards (studio only)	all Ozzy Osbourne releases from No Rest for the Wicked (1988) to Live at Budokan (2002); Black Rain (2007); Patient Number 9 (2022)
	Geezer Butler	1988–1989 (touring); 1995–1996 (session)	bass	Just Say Ozzy (1989); Ozzmosis (1995)
	Mike Inez	1989–1992; 1996 (touring); 1998 (touring); 2025	bass	Live & Loud (1993) No More Tears (1991) (credited, but does not play on the album)
	Deen Castronovo	1994–1995 (session)	drums	Ozzmosis (1995)
	Joe Holmes	1995–2001	guitar	"Walk on Water" (1996)
	Robert Trujillo	1996–2003; 2020–2022 (session)	bass	Down to Earth (2001); Blizzard of Ozz and Diary of a Madman reissues (2002); Live at Budokan (2002); Patient Number 9 (2022)
	Mike Bordin	1996–2010 (inactive 2000)	drums; percussion	all Ozzy Osbourne releases from Down to Earth (2001) to Black Rain (2007)
	Jason Newsted	2003	bass	none – live performances only
	Rob "Blasko" Nicholson	2003–2020	bass	Black Rain (2007); Scream (2010); iTunes Festival: London 2010 (2010)
	Gus G	2009–2017	guitar; backing vocals	Scream (2010); iTunes Festival: London 2010 (2010)
	Adam Wakeman	2010–2025 (session/touring 2004–2010)	keyboards; rhythm guitar; backing vocals	Under Cover (2005); Scream (2010); iTunes Festival: London 2010 (2010)
	Tommy Clufetos	2010–2025 (initially a touring substitute in 2009)	drums	iTunes Festival: London 2010 (2010)

== Other contributors ==
=== Backup musicians ===
Image	Name	Years active	Instruments	Details
	Lindsay Bridgwater	1980–1981 (touring only); 1982–1983 (touring only)	keyboards	Bridgwater performed on the Blizzard of Ozz, Diary of a Madman and Speak of the Devil Tours.
	Johnny Cook	1981 (session only)	keyboards	Cook performed on 1981's Diary of a Madman, although Airey was credited on the album's sleeve.
	Mike Moran	1985 (session only)	keyboards	Moran performed keyboards on Osbourne's 1986 album The Ultimate Sin.
	John Sinclair	1986–1991 (session/touring); 1995–2003 (touring only)	keyboards	Sinclair joined in time for The Ultimate Sin Tour, remaining with Osbourne's band for 17 years.
	Kevin Jones	1991–1992 (touring only)	keyboards	Jones temporarily replaced Sinclair, who was touring with the Cult, for the Theatre of Madness Tour.
	Rick Wakeman	1995 (session only)	keyboards	Wakeman performed keyboards on the 1995 album Ozzmosis, alongside producer Michael Beinhorn.
	Michael Railo	2001 (session only)	keyboards; backing vocals	Railo performed keyboards on the 2001 album Down to Earth, alongside producer Tim Palmer.
	Tim Palmer	2001 (session only)	rhythm guitar; acoustic guitar; keyboards; military drums; backing vocals	Railo performed keyboards on the 2001 album Down to Earth, alongside producer Tim Palmer.
	Michael St. Claire	2003 (touring only)	keyboards	
	Kevin Churko	2010 (session only)	drums	Producer Churko played drums on Scream before Clufetos joined.
	Andrew Watt	2019; 2021–2022 (session; one live performance)	guitar; vocals; keyboards; piano; bass; drums; string arrangements	Watt, Slash, McKagan and Smith performed on Osbourne's 2020 album Ordinary Man. Watt, Smith and McKagan also played on Patient Number 9 (2022) and Watt also performed with Osbourne at the 2022 NFL Halftime show.
	Chad Smith	2019 (session only)	drums; percussion	Watt, Slash, McKagan and Smith performed on Osbourne's 2020 album Ordinary Man. Watt, Smith and McKagan also played on Patient Number 9 (2022) and Watt also performed with Osbourne at the 2022 NFL Halftime show.
	Slash	2019 (session only)	guitar	Watt, Slash, McKagan and Smith performed on Osbourne's 2020 album Ordinary Man. Watt, Smith and McKagan also played on Patient Number 9 (2022) and Watt also performed with Osbourne at the 2022 NFL Halftime show.
	Duff Mckagan	2019 (session only)	bass	Watt, Slash, McKagan and Smith performed on Osbourne's 2020 album Ordinary Man. Watt, Smith and McKagan also played on Patient Number 9 (2022) and Watt also performed with Osbourne at the 2022 NFL Halftime show.
	Chris Chaney	2022 (session/touring)	bass	Chaney performed bass with Osbourne at the halftime of the Los Angeles Rams season opener on Thursday, September 8 at SoFi Stadium, he also played on one track on Patient Number 9.

=== Guest contributors ===
Image	Name	Years active	Instruments	Details
	Alex Skolnick	1995 (touring substitutes)	guitar	Skolnick played one unannounced show with Osbourne but was later replaced by Joe Holmes.
	Roy Mayorga	2000 (touring substitutes)	drums	Mayorga and Tichy substituted for Mike Bordin while he was touring with Korn during 2000.
	Brian Tichy	2000 (touring substitutes)	drums	Mayorga and Tichy substituted for Mike Bordin while he was touring with Korn during 2000.
	Danny Saber	2001 (session musician)	guitar; tubular bells	Saber contributed additional guitar to "Alive" and tubular bells to the 2002 reissue of Blizzard of Ozz.
	Chris Wyse	2004 (session musicians)	bass	Cantrell, Wyse and regular drummer Mike Bordin performed on the 2005 album Under Cover.
	Jerry Cantrell	2004 (session musicians)	guitar	Cantrell, Wyse and regular drummer Mike Bordin performed on the 2005 album Under Cover.
	Tony Iommi	2022 (one off)	guitar	Iommi joined Osbourne, Wakeman and Clufetos at the 2022 Commonwealth Games.

=== Abridged musicians ===
Image	Name	Years active	Instruments	Details
	Robert Sarzo	1982	guitar	Sarzo, brother of then bassist Rudy, was chosen as the replacement for Rhoads, although Osbourne's label Jet Records had already promised the position to Bernie Tormé, who joined thereafter.
	Fred Coury	1985	drums	Coury and later DeGrasso, initially played drums on The Ultimate Sin, however the sessions were later scrapped.
	Jimmy DeGrasso	1985	drums	Coury and later DeGrasso, initially played drums on The Ultimate Sin, however the sessions were later scrapped.
	Terry Nails	1989	bass	After the No Rest for the Wicked Tour, bassist Terry Nails began recording with the band, although before the end of 1989 he was replaced by Mike Inez. Nails later appeared on three previously unreleased demo recordings on Prince of Darkness (2005)
	Steve Vai	1994–1995	guitar	Vai rehearsed with Osbourne, Bob Daisley and Deen Castonovo, in 1994 though the lineup fell apart early the next year. Vai is credited for songwriting on ''Ozzmosis'' (1995) for "My Little Man"

== Line-ups ==
Period	Members	Releases
November 1979 – February 1981	Ozzy Osbourne – lead vocals; Randy Rhoads – guitar; Bob Daisley – bass, backing vocals, percussion; Lee Kerslake – drums, percussion; Don Airey – keyboards (session); Lindsey Bridgwater – keyboards (touring)	Blizzard of Ozz (1980); Mr Crowley Live EP (1980); Tribute (1987) – two tracks only
February – March 1981	Ozzy Osbourne – lead vocals; Randy Rhoads – guitar; Bob Daisley – bass, backing vocals; Lee Kerslake – drums, percussion; Johnny Cook – keyboards (session)	Diary of a Madman (1981)
March – December 1981	Ozzy Osbourne – vocals; Randy Rhoads – guitar; Rudy Sarzo – bass; Tommy Aldridge – drums; Lindsey Bridgwater – keyboards (touring)	Tribute (1987) – remaining tracks; Ozzy Live (2012)
December 1981 – March 1982	Ozzy Osbourne – vocals; Randy Rhoads – guitar; Rudy Sarzo – bass; Tommy Aldridge – drums; Don Airey – keyboards (touring)	none – Diary of a Madman Tour only
March – April 1982	Ozzy Osbourne – vocals; Rudy Sarzo – bass; Tommy Aldridge – drums; Bernie Tormé – guitar; Don Airey – keyboards (touring)	none – Diary of a Madman Tour only
April – September 1982	Ozzy Osbourne – vocals; Rudy Sarzo – bass; Tommy Aldridge – drums; Brad Gillis – guitar; Don Airey – keyboards (touring)	Speak of the Devil (1982)
December 1982	Ozzy Osbourne – vocals; Tommy Aldridge – drums; Brad Gillis – guitar; Pete Way – bass; Lindsey Bridgwater – keyboards (touring)	none – Speak of the Devil Tour only
December 1982 – February 1983	Ozzy Osbourne – lead vocals; Tommy Aldridge – drums; Jake E. Lee – guitar, backing vocals; Don Costa – bass; Lindsey Bridgwater – keyboards (touring)	none – Speak of the Devil Tour only
February – May 1983	Ozzy Osbourne – lead vocals; Tommy Aldridge – drums; Jake E. Lee – guitar, backing vocals; Don Costa – bass; Don Airey – keyboards (touring)	none – Speak of the Devil Tour only
May – September 1983	Ozzy Osbourne – lead vocals; Tommy Aldridge – drums; Jake E. Lee – guitar, backing vocals; Bob Daisley – bass, backing vocals; Don Airey – keyboards	Bark at the Moon (1983)
September 1983 – March 1984	Ozzy Osbourne – lead vocals; Jake E. Lee – guitar, backing vocals; Bob Daisley – bass, backing vocals; Don Airey – keyboards; Carmine Appice – drums	none – Bark at the Moon Tour only
March 1984 – January 1985	Ozzy Osbourne – lead vocals; Jake E. Lee – guitar, backing vocals; Bob Daisley – bass, backing vocals; Don Airey – keyboards; Tommy Aldridge – drums	none – Bark at the Moon Tour only
February – March 1985	Ozzy Osbourne – lead vocals; Jake E. Lee – guitar, backing vocals; Bob Daisley – bass, backing vocals; Fred Coury – drums	none – studio rehearsals only
March – April 1985	Ozzy Osbourne – lead vocals; Jake E. Lee – guitar, backing vocals; Bob Daisley – bass, backing vocals; Jimmy DeGrasso – drums; Mike Moran – keyboards (session)	none – studio rehearsals only
August – late 1985	Ozzy Osbourne – lead vocals; Jake E. Lee – guitar, backing vocals; Phil Soussan – bass; Randy Castillo – drums; Mike Moran – keyboards (session)	The Ultimate Sin (1986)
Early 1986 – April 1987	Ozzy Osbourne – lead vocals; Jake E. Lee – guitar, backing vocals; Phil Soussan – bass; Randy Castillo – drums; John Sinclair – keyboards (session/touring)	Ultimate Live Ozzy (1986)
May – late 1987	Ozzy Osbourne – lead vocals; Phil Soussan – bass; Randy Castillo – drums; Zakk Wylde – guitar, backing vocals; John Sinclair – keyboards (session/touring)	none – studio rehearsals only
Late 1987 – early 1988	Ozzy Osbourne – lead vocals; Randy Castillo – drums; Zakk Wylde – guitar, backing vocals; Bob Daisley – bass (session); John Sinclair – keyboards (session/touring)	No Rest for the Wicked (1988)
May 1988 – August 1989	Ozzy Osbourne – lead vocals; Randy Castillo – drums; Zakk Wylde – guitar, backing vocals; Geezer Butler – bass; John Sinclair – keyboards (session/touring)	Just Say Ozzy (1989)
Late 1989	Ozzy Osbourne – lead vocals; Randy Castillo – drums; Zakk Wylde – guitar, backing vocals; Terry Nails – bass; John Sinclair – keyboards (session/touring)	none – studio rehearsals only (demos later released on Prince of Darkness)
Late 1989 – October 1991	Ozzy Osbourne – lead vocals; Randy Castillo – drums; Zakk Wylde – guitar, backing vocals; Mike Inez – bass; John Sinclair – keyboards (session/touring)	No More Tears (1991) (featured Bob Daisley in place of Inez on bass)
October 1991 – May 1992	Ozzy Osbourne – lead vocals; Randy Castillo – drums; Zakk Wylde – guitar, backing vocals; Mike Inez – bass; Kevin Jones – keyboards (touring)	Live & Loud (1993)
May – November 1992	Ozzy Osbourne – lead vocals; Randy Castillo – drums; Zakk Wylde – guitar, backing vocals; Mike Inez – bass; John Sinclair – keyboards (session/touring)	none – No More Tours Tour only
Band inactive November 1992 – late 1994
Late 1994 – February 1995	Ozzy Osbourne – vocals; Steve Vai – guitar; Bob Daisley – bass; Deen Castronovo – drums	none – studio rehearsals only
February – May 1995	Ozzy Osbourne – vocals; Deen Castronovo – drums; Geezer Butler – bass; Zakk Wylde – guitar (session); Rick Wakeman – keyboards (session)	Ozzmosis (1995)
May – July 1995	Ozzy Osbourne – vocals; Deen Castronovo – drums; Geezer Butler – bass; Alex Skolnick – guitar; John Sinclair – keyboards (touring)	none – Retirement Sucks Tour only
July – September 1995	Ozzy Osbourne – vocals; Deen Castronovo – drums; Geezer Butler – bass; Joe Holmes – guitar; John Sinclair – keyboards (touring)	none – Retirement Sucks Tour only
September 1995 – January 1996	Ozzy Osbourne – vocals; Geezer Butler – bass; Joe Holmes – guitar; Randy Castillo – drums; John Sinclair – keyboards (touring)	none – Retirement Sucks Tour only
January – March 1996	Ozzy Osbourne – vocals; Joe Holmes – guitar; Randy Castillo – drums; Mike Inez – bass (touring); John Sinclair – keyboards (touring)	none – Retirement Sucks Tour only
March 1996 – October 2000	Ozzy Osbourne – vocals; Joe Holmes – guitar; Robert Trujillo – bass; Mike Bordin – drums; John Sinclair – keyboards (touring)	"Walk on Water" (1996)
January – March 1998 (one-off touring lineup)	Ozzy Osbourne – vocals; Zakk Wylde – guitar; Mike Inez – bass; Randy Castillo – drums; John Sinclair – keyboards (touring)	none – The Ozzman Cometh Tour only
April – May 2000	Ozzy Osbourne – vocals; Joe Holmes – guitar; Robert Trujillo – bass; Roy Mayorga – drums (touring); John Sinclair – keyboards (touring)	none – Ozzfest tour dates only
May – September 2000	Ozzy Osbourne – vocals; Joe Holmes – guitar; Robert Trujillo – bass; Brian Tichy – drums (touring); John Sinclair – keyboards (touring)	none – Ozzfest tour dates only
September 2000 – January 2001	Ozzy Osbourne – vocals; Joe Holmes – guitar; Robert Trujillo – bass; Mike Bordin – drums; John Sinclair – keyboards (touring)	none – studio rehearsals only
January 2001 – March 2003	Ozzy Osbourne – lead vocals; Robert Trujillo – bass; Mike Bordin – drums; Zakk Wylde – guitar, backing vocals; Michael Railo – keyboards (session); John Sinclair – keyboards (touring)	Down to Earth (2001); Live at Budokan (2002)
March – December 2003	Ozzy Osbourne – lead vocals; Mike Bordin – drums; Zakk Wylde – guitar, backing vocals; Jason Newsted – bass; Michael St. Claire – keyboards (touring)	none – Ozzfest and other tour dates only
December 2003 – July 2004	Ozzy Osbourne – lead vocals; Mike Bordin – drums; Zakk Wylde – guitar, backing vocals; Rob "Blasko" Nicholson – bass	none – studio rehearsals only
July 2004 – July 2009	Ozzy Osbourne – lead vocals; Mike Bordin – drums; Zakk Wylde – guitar, keyboards, backing vocals; Rob "Blasko" Nicholson – bass; Adam Wakeman – keyboards, guitar (touring)	Black Rain (2007)
Summer – late 2004 (special recording lineup)	Ozzy Osbourne – vocals; Mike Bordin – drums; Jerry Cantrell – guitar; Chris Wyse – bass	Under Cover (2005)
July 2009 – April 2017	Ozzy Osbourne – lead vocals; Rob "Blasko" Nicholson – bass; Adam Wakeman – keyboards, rhythm guitar; Gus G – lead guitar, backing vocals; Tommy Clufetos – drums (initially touring)	Scream (2010); iTunes Festival: London 2010 (2010)
April 2017 – early 2019	Ozzy Osbourne – lead vocals; Rob "Blasko" Nicholson – bass; Adam Wakeman – keyboards, rhythm guitar; Tommy Clufetos – drums; Zakk Wylde – lead guitar, backing vocals	none to date – No More Tours II only
September – November 2019 (special recording lineup)	Ozzy Osbourne – vocals; Andrew Watt – guitar; Duff McKagan – bass; Chad Smith – drums	Ordinary Man (2020)
August 2022 (one off reunion show)	Ozzy Osbourne – vocals; Adam Wakeman – bass; Tommy Clufetos – drums; Tony Iommi – guitar	none – Commonwealth Games closing ceremony
September 2022	Ozzy Osbourne – vocals; Tommy Clufetos – drums; Zakk Wylde – guitar; Andrew Watt – guitar; Chris Chaney – bass	none – NFL halftime show
July 2025	Ozzy Osbourne – lead vocals; Adam Wakeman – keyboards; Tommy Clufetos – drums; Zakk Wylde – guitars, backing vocals; Mike Inez – bass	none – Back to the Beginning
