= Ozzy Osbourne Band =

Supporting band of the musician Ozzy Osbourne

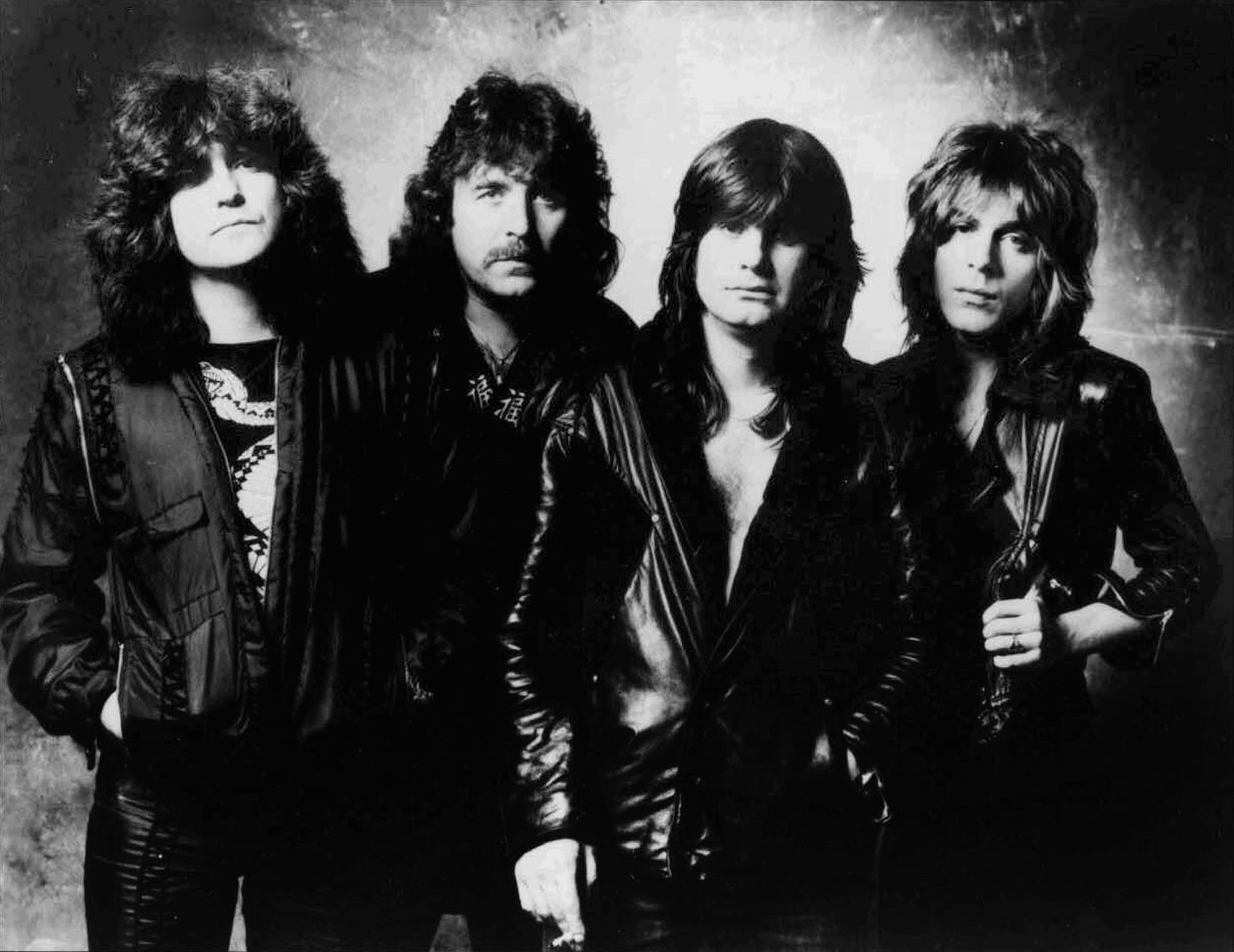
- Ozzy Osbourne band in 1980, then known as "Blizzard of Ozz". L-R: Bob Daisley, Lee Kerslake, Osbourne, Randy Rhoads

Background information
- Genres: Heavy metal; Hard rock; Glam metal
- Years active: 1979–2025
- Past members: Ozzy Osbourne; Bob Daisley; Lee Kerslake; Randy Rhoads

The Ozzy Osbourne Band (initially known as Blizzard of Ozz) was the band that backed the British heavy metal singer and songwriter Ozzy Osbourne on both studio and live recordings. The band went through several lineup changes and were often not recognised as a formal entity, and were instead referred to simply as the Ozzy Osbourne Band.

After he was fired from Black Sabbath early in 1979, Osbourne formed a solo band in November of that year with guitarist Randy Rhoads, bassist Bob Daisley, then Robert Trujilo and drummer Lee Kerslake. The group's personnel changed frequently. The final lineup included guitarist Zakk Wylde (who first joined in 1987 until 1992, spent a second tenure in the band from 2001 and 2009, and then rejoined in 2017), bassist Rudy Sarzo and Mike Inez (who first joined in 1980s, had touring tenures in 1996 and 1998, and returned in 2025), keyboardist and rhythm guitarist Adam Wakeman (who first joined as a touring musician in 2004, and was made an official member with the release of Scream in 2010), and drummer Tommy Clufetos (since 2010).

Until 2020, Osbourne's touring band always performed on the albums. From Ordinary Man onwards his albums instead featured an array of session and guest musicians with minimal or no contributions from his touring band.

== History ==
=== 1979–1982 ===
Ozzy Osbourne was fired from Black Sabbath on 27 April 1979, primarily due to his problems with alcohol and drug abuse. The vocalist subsequently rehearsed with a range of musicians in an attempt to form his own band, including guitarists Gary Moore of Thin Lizzy and George Lynch of Dokken, bassist Dana Strum, and drummers Dixie Lee of Lone Star and Dave Potts of Praying Mantis. By November 1979, he had settled on a supergroup lineup including former Quiet Riot guitarist Randy Rhoads, former Rainbow bassist and backing vocalist Bob Daisley, and former Uriah Heep drummer Lee Kerslake.

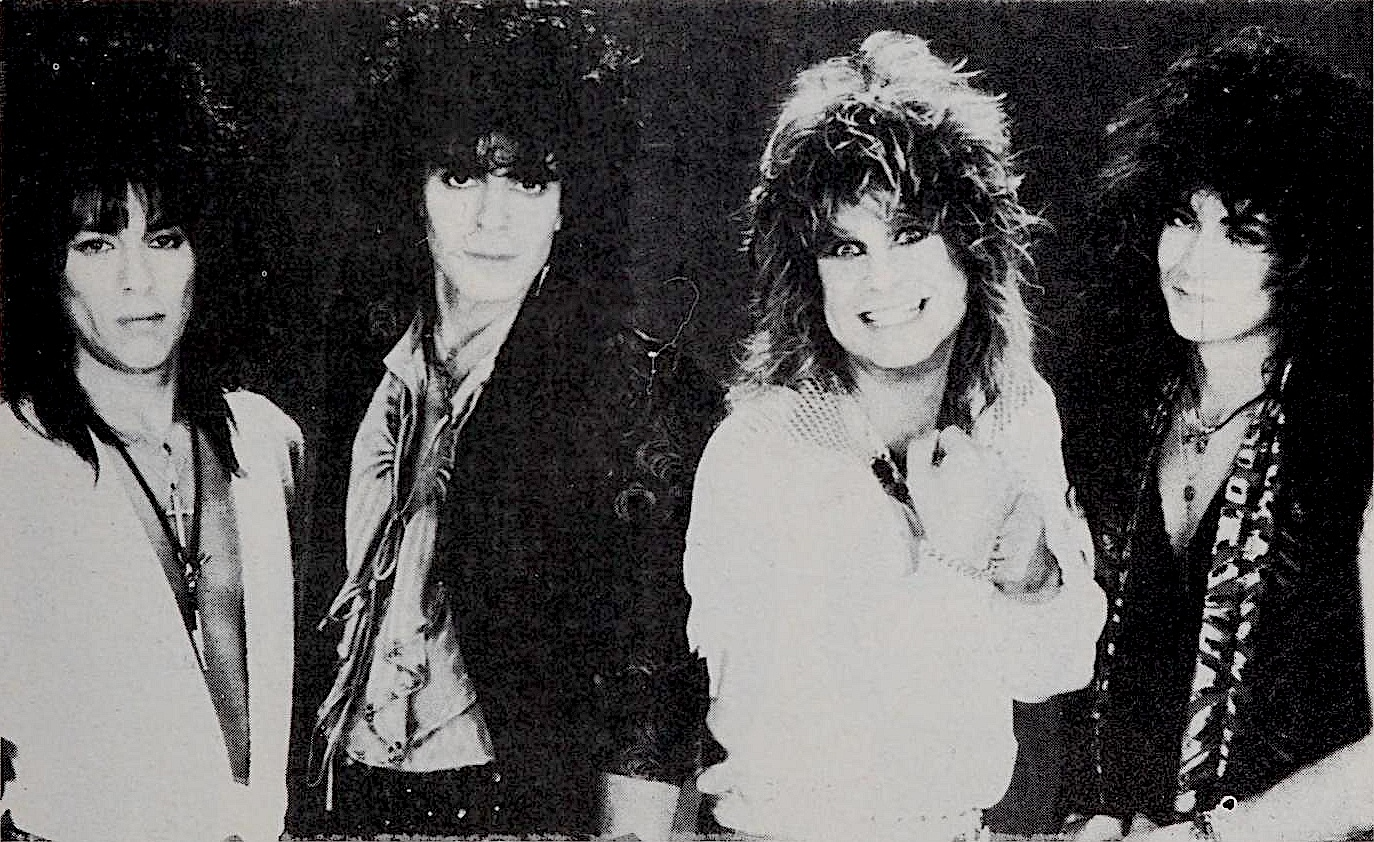
Ozzy Osbourne band in 1986. L-R: Randy Castillo, Phil Soussan, Osbourne, Jake E. Lee

The new band released their debut album Blizzard of Ozz in September 1980, which also featured keyboard contributions from Don Airey. For the album's promotional tour, this role was handled by Lindsay Bridgwater. After the recording of Diary of a Madman, on which Johnny Cook performed uncredited keyboards, both Daisley and Kerslake were fired; Osbourne has blamed the pair's dismissal on creative differences, while his wife Sharon has cited financial disputes.They were replaced by Rudy Sarzo (a former member of Quiet Riot with Rhoads) and Tommy Aldridge, respectively, who were both credited on the Diary of a Madman album sleeve, despite having not performed on it. After the end of the Blizzard of Ozz touring cycle, Diary of a Madman was released in November 1981.

The Diary of a Madman Tour commenced in December, with Don Airey in place of Bridgwater on keyboards. On 19 March 1982, however, the tour came to an abrupt halt when Rhoads was killed in a plane crash in Leesburg, Florida. The incident occurred when tour bus driver Andrew Aycock took the aircraft out for a joyride and repeatedly flew close to the bus, eventually clipping it and crashing into a building. After a two-week break, Sarzo's brother Robert was chosen as the replacement for Rhoads, although Osbourne's label Jet Records had already promised the position to Bernie Tormé, who joined thereafter.

Tormé debuted with the band on 1 April 1982 in Bethlehem, Pennsylvania. However, after just seven shows he had left again, in part to focus on his solo career but also due to the "horrible ... bad atmosphere" that was present in the wake of Rhoads's death. On 13 April, Night Ranger guitarist Brad Gillis took over from Tormé, remaining for the rest of the tour. Osbourne was contractually obliged by CBS Records to produce a live album before the end of the year, which came in the form of Speak of the Devil, a collection of Black Sabbath covers. After the tour's conclusion in September, Sarzo left Osbourne's band.

=== 1982–1992 ===
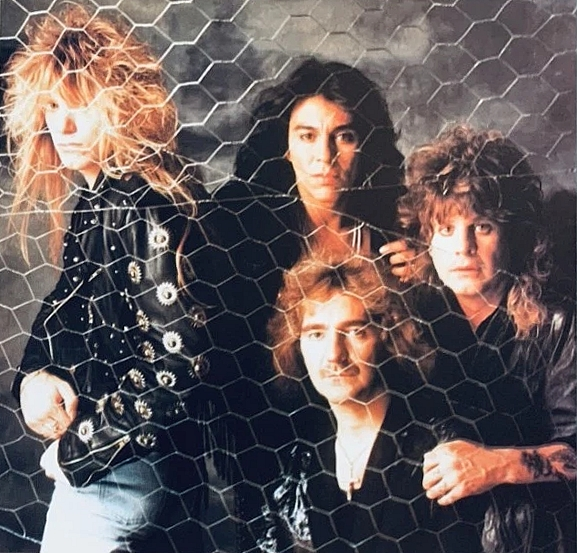
Ozzy Osbourne band in 1988. L-R: Zakk Wylde, Randy Castillo, Geezer Butler (bottom), Osbourne

For the first leg of the Speak of the Devil Tour in December 1982, Osbourne and his band performed with UFO bassist Pete Way. After Gillis left to return to Night Ranger, the position of guitarist was filled at the end of the year by Jake E. Lee, formerly of Ratt and Rough Cutt. George Lynch, who had previously auditioned for the band in 1979, was initially given the role by Osbourne, but was then immediately fired when Lee was brought in. Don Costa took over from Way for the remainder of the tour, before Bob Daisley returned in time to perform at the US Festival in May. After the recording of Bark at the Moon, Tommy Aldridge was replaced by Carmine Appice, although by early 1984 he had returned due to personal differences and tensions between Osbourne and the new drummer. By the time the Bark at the Moon Tour had finished in January 1985, Aldridge had decided to leave the band again, having not fully enjoyed the role since Rhoads's death.

Lee and Daisley commenced work on the next Ozzy Osbourne album The Ultimate Sin without the eponymous vocalist, who had been admitted to a drug and alcohol rehabilitation centre. Drums were handled initially by Fred Coury and later Jimmy DeGrasso, however the sessions were later scrapped and both Daisley and DeGrasso left the group. By the time recording restarted in the summer, the group consisted of Osbourne, Lee, bassist Phil Soussan and former Lita Ford drummer Randy Castillo. Keyboards on the album were performed by Mike Moran. For the subsequent promotional tour, John Sinclair took over as the band's backup keyboardist.

Osbourne and Lee parted ways after the conclusion of The Ultimate Sin Tour, reportedly on "amiable" terms. After various guitarists sent in demo tapes and auditioned for the vacated role, Zakk Wylde (then using the moniker "Zack Wylant") was chosen as Lee's replacement, debuting at a private show at Wormwood Scrubs Prison in July. Soussan left shortly thereafter due to disagreements over songwriting credits, with Bob Daisley returning to record bass on No Rest for the Wicked. In May 1988, it was announced that former Black Sabbath bassist Geezer Butler would join the lineup of Osbourne's band for the No Rest for the Wicked Tour later that year.

After the tour, the group began working on new material with bassist Terry Nails, although before the end of 1989 he was replaced by Mike Inez. The new bassist, however, was later replaced for the recording by Bob Daisley, who claimed that Inez's parts were not "sounding and feeling how Ozzy wanted" them to. Inez remained the group's official bassist and was credited with "bass and music inspiration" on the sleeve of the resulting album, No More Tears. For the subsequent Theatre of Madness Tour, Kevin Jones took over from Sinclair, who was then touring with the Cult.Osbourne later announced that he intended to retire from music, embarking on the No More Tours Tour in 1992. The final shows took place in November and featured reunions with former Black Sabbath bandmates Tony Iommi, Geezer Butler and Bill Ward.

=== 1994–2003 ===
Despite describing his retirement as "absolutely for real", Osbourne returned to his music career just two years later, claiming that "Retirement sucked. It wasn't too long before I started getting antsy and writing songs again." In the meantime, Inez had joined Alice in Chains and Wylde had formed Pride & Glory, meaning the singer had to recruit a new band – in 1994, he began rehearsing with Bob Daisley, former David Lee Roth and Whitesnake guitarist Steve Vai, and former Hardline drummer Deen Castronovo. This lineup fell apart early the next year, with Zakk Wylde and Geezer Butler brought in to replace Vai and Daisley on the Ozzmosis album.

Osbourne's first show after returning took place in Nottingham, England in June 1995 and featured former Testament guitarist Alex Skolnick as part of the lineup. However, a few weeks later, he was informed that he would not be joining the band. The role was instead given to Joe Holmes, another former David Lee Roth band member, who began rehearsing with the group in July. The Retirement Sucks Tour commenced in August with a string of South American shows as part of Monsters of Rock, after which Castronovo was fired due to differences with Osbourne, and replaced by the returning Randy Castillo. Another change in personnel came in January 1996, when Butler left the tour due to homesickness, with Osbourne enlisting former bassist Mike Inez to take his place for the rest of the shows.

By March 1996, Inez and Castillo had been replaced by Robert Trujillo (formerly of Suicidal Tendencies and Infectious Grooves) and Mike Bordin (of Faith No More). During the build-up to the following year's Ozzfest tour, it was reported that Holmes had left Osbourne's band after becoming a "born again Catholic". However, just over a month later the reports were updated to state that the guitarist had returned. In early 1998, Osbourne temporarily reunited with former members Zakk Wylde, Mike Inez and Randy Castillo for The Ozzman Cometh Tour in Australia, New Zealand and Japan. Holmes, Trujillo and Bordin remained the official members of the band, however, and began work on their first album together in 1999. Bordin spent much of 2000 filling in for the injured David Silveria in Korn.

While Bordin was unavailable, drums were handled by Roy Mayorga and later Brian Tichy. Holmes remained after the end of the 2000 Ozzfest tour to work on Osbourne's next album, co-writing three songs, but by early 2001 had been replaced by the returning Zakk Wylde. Down to Earth was released later that year, with keyboards performed by Michael Railo and producer Tim Palmer. The band's lineup remained stable for the Merry Mayhem and Down to Earth Tours, before Trujillo left to join Metallica in February 2003, following several auditions. After his last show on 14 March, he was replaced in Osbourne's band by his predecessor in Metallica, Jason Newsted. The new bassist toured with the group throughout the year, but by December had been replaced by Rob "Blasko" Nicholson.

=== 2003–2019 ===
Days after the announcement of Nicholson's addition to his band, Osbourne was injured in a quad bike crash and forced to cancel many of his 2004 tour dates. He returned for the Ozzfest tour in the summer. The shows also featured the debut of new keyboardist and rhythm guitarist Adam Wakeman, who had initially been asked to join the previous year before Osbourne's accident. Around the same time, the vocalist recorded Under Cover, an album of cover versions, with Alice in Chains guitarist Jerry Cantrell, former Cult bassist Chris Wyse and regular drummer Mike Bordin. The regular lineup remained for Black Rain, which was released in 2007. In July 2009, Osbourne parted ways with long-term guitarist Zakk Wylde, joking that his music was "beginning to sound like [Wylde's other band] Black Label Society". Wylde was replaced by Firewind guitarist Gus G, who was hired immediately after auditioning.

During Gus G's audition and first shows, Rob Zombie drummer Tommy Clufetos was asked to fill in for Bordin, who had recently reformed Faith No More. This led to him becoming a full-time member of the band, debuting on the following year's studio album Scream, which also marked the debut of Wakeman as an official member of the group. The band remained inactive for much of the next few years, as Osbourne and Clufetos performed as part of the reunited Black Sabbath on their final concert tour, which ended on 4 February 2017. Less than three months after the end of the tour, Osbourne announced that he would be reuniting with Zakk Wylde for an upcoming tour celebrating the 30th anniversary of their working relationship. This was later expanded into No More Tours II, dubbed the last worldwide tour by the vocalist, which was set to run through 2020, but was postposed and later cancelled in 2023.

=== 2020–2025, Death of Osbourne ===
After 2020's Ordinary Man Osbourne no longer used his touring band for recording sessions instead opting for an array of session and guest musicians. Ordinary Man featured 0 contributions from his touring band while Patient Number 9 featured minimal contributions from Zakk Wylde on some tracks and none from Nicholson, Wakeman and Clufetos.

Osbourne played two shows, one at the 2022 Commonwealth Games in Birmingham, alongside Black Sabbath guitarist Tony Iommi, Adam Wakeman (on bass) and Tommy Clufetos (on drums), and again at the 2022 NFL Halftime Performance, alongside Wylde, Clufetos, bassist Chris Chaney and producer Andrew Watt. In July 2025, Osbourne played a solo set at the Back to the Beginning concert, backed by Wylde, Wakeman, Clufetos and former bassist Mike Inez.

Osbourne played what ultimately became his final show, billed as "Back to the Beginning", alongside the original line-up of Black Sabbath, at Villa Park in Birmingham on 5 July 2025. Also performing a set of his solo work with his touring band. Having been rendered unable to stand from Parkinson's disease, Osbourne performed seated on a black throne.

Osbourne died at his home in Buckinghamshire on the morning of 22 July 2025, aged 76, concluding his solo career.

== Band members ==
=== Final members ===
- Ozzy Osbourne – vocals (1979–1992, 1994–2025)
- Zakk Wylde – lead guitar, backing vocals (1987–1992, 1995, 1998, 2001–2004, 2006–2009, 2017–2025)
- Mike Inez – bass (1989–1992, 1996, 1998, 2025)
- Adam Wakeman – keyboards, rhythm guitar (2004–2025)
- Tommy Clufetos – drums (2010–2025)
