= The Ozzman Cometh =

Compilation album by Ozzy Osbourne
- Released: 11 November 1997
- Recorded: 1970; 1980–1997
- Genres: Heavy metal; hard rock
- Length: 77:00
- Label: Epic
- Producers: Roy Thomas Baker; Duane Baron; Michael Beinhorn; Ron Nevison; Max Norman; Keith Olsen; Ozzy Osbourne; John Purdell; Randy Rhoads

Ozzy Osbourne chronology
Ozzmosis (1995)	The Ozzman Cometh (1997)	Down to Earth (2001)

Singles from The Ozzman Cometh
- 1. "Back on Earth" Released: 1997

Professional ratings
Review scores
Source	Rating
AllMusic	4.5/5 stars
NME	6/10 stars

The Ozzman Cometh is a compilation album by British heavy metal singer Ozzy Osbourne released in 1997. It is his first greatest hits collection. Its initial, limited-edition 2-CD pressing contained five previously unreleased songs. Versions released in 2002 later have only one disc, and the song "Shot in the Dark" is replaced by "Miracle Man". This was due to a legal action brought about by the song's co-writer, Phil Soussan, for unpaid royalties. This is also the first album to be released after Osbourne rejoined Black Sabbath after his firing from the band in 1979.

The CD version is digitally labeled as The Ozzman Cometh: Greatest Hits. The tracks "Black Sabbath", "War Pigs", "Fairies Wear Boots", and "Behind the Wall of Sleep" are performed by Osbourne's previous band Black Sabbath during a 26 April 1970 performance on the BBC Radio 1 show "John Peel's Sunday Show", conducted by British DJ John Peel. "Fairies Wear Boots" and "War Pigs" are early versions of tracks that would be recorded and released on the band's second album Paranoid with new lyrics.

== Track listing ==
Disc one
No.	Title	Writer(s)	Originally from	Length
1.	"Black Sabbath" (previously unreleased, featuring extra verse not on album Black Sabbath (1970))	Ozzy Osbourne; Tony Iommi; Geezer Butler; Bill Ward	"The John Peel Sessions" of 26 April 1970	9:25
2.	"War Pigs" (previously unreleased, early version titled "Walpurgis" with different lyrics)	Osbourne; Iommi; Butler; Ward	"The John Peel Sessions" of 26 April 1970	8:15
3.	"Goodbye to Romance"	Osbourne; Randy Rhoads; Bob Daisley	Blizzard of Ozz (1980)	5:35
4.	"Crazy Train"	Osbourne; Rhoads; Daisley	Blizzard of Ozz	4:51
5.	"Mr. Crowley"	Osbourne; Rhoads; Daisley	Blizzard of Ozz	4:56
6.	"Over the Mountain"	Osbourne; Rhoads; Daisley; Lee Kerslake	Diary of a Madman (1981)	4:32
7.	"Paranoid" (live)	Osbourne; Iommi; Butler; Ward	Tribute (1987)	2:53
8.	"Bark at the Moon"	Osbourne; Jake E. Lee; Daisley	Bark at the Moon (1983)	4:17
9.	"Shot in the Dark" (original release) "Miracle Man" (2002 reissue)	Osbourne; Phil Soussan Osbourne; Wylde; Daisley	The Ultimate Sin (1986); No Rest for the Wicked (1988)	4:17; 3:44
10.	"Crazy Babies"	Osbourne; Zakk Wylde; Daisley; Randy Castillo	No Rest for the Wicked	4:14
11.	"No More Tears" (radio edit)	Osbourne; Wylde; Mike Inez; Castillo; John Purdell	No More Tears (1991)	5:54
12.	"Mama, I'm Coming Home"	Osbourne; Wylde; Lemmy Kilmister	No More Tears	4:11
13.	"I Don't Want to Change the World" (live)	Osbourne; Wylde; Castillo; Kilmister	Live & Loud (1993)	4:00
14.	"I Just Want You"	Osbourne; Jim Vallance	Ozzmosis (1995)	4:57
15.	"Back on Earth" (previously unreleased)	Richard Supa; Taylor Rhodes	Ozzmosis sessions	5:00

Disc two
No.	Title	Writer(s)	Originally from	Length
1.	"Fairies Wear Boots" (previously unreleased)	Osbourne; Iommi; Butler; Ward	"The John Peel Sessions" of 26 April 1970	6:53
2.	"Behind the Wall of Sleep" (previously unreleased)	Osbourne; Iommi; Butler; Ward	"The John Peel Sessions" of 26 April 1970	5:09
3.	"Walk on Water" (Japanese edition bonus track)	Osbourne; Vallance	Beavis and Butt-Head Do America soundtrack (1996)	4:19
4.	"Pictures of Matchstick Men" (Status Quo cover, recorded with Type O Negative, Japanese edition bonus track)	Francis Rossi	Private Parts: The Album (1997)	6:05
5.	"Interview with Ozzy 1988"			17:45

== Charts ==
=== Album ===
Year	Chart	Position
1997	Australian Albums (ARIA)	62
1997	Canadian Albums Chart	7
1997	Swedish Albums Chart	21
1997	UK Albums Chart	68
1997	US Billboard 200	13
1998	New Zealand Albums Chart	12
2002	Finnish Albums Chart	7

=== Singles ===
Year	Single	Chart	Position
1997	"Back on Earth"	Mainstream Rock (USA)	3

== Certifications and sales ==
Region	Certification	Certified units/sales
Canada (Music Canada)	Platinum	100,000^{^}
Czech Republic	—	28,000
Finland (Musiikkituottajat)	Gold	31,901
United States (RIAA)	2× Platinum	2,000,000^{^}
^{^} Shipments figures based on certification alone.
