= Live & Loud (Ozzy Osbourne album) =

1993 live album by Ozzy Osbourne

Live album by Ozzy Osbourne
- Released: 7 June 1993
- Recorded: 1992
- Genre: Heavy metal
- Length: 117:16
- Label: Epic

Ozzy Osbourne chronology
No More Tears (1991)	Live & Loud (1993)	Ozzmosis (1995)

Singles from Live & Loud
- 1. "Changes" Released: 21 June 1993

Live & Loud

Video by Ozzy Osbourne
- Released: 18 May 1993
- Recorded: 1992
- Genre: Heavy metal
- Length: 112 minutes
- Label: Epic/Sony
- Director: Jeb Brien
- Producers: Jeb Brien and Charles S. Carroll

Ozzy Osbourne video chronology
Don't Blame Me (1991)	Live & Loud (1993)	Gets Me Through (2001)

Professional ratings
Review scores
Source	Rating
AllMusic	3/5 stars
AllMusic	(DVD)

Live & Loud is a live album recorded by heavy metal vocalist Ozzy Osbourne, released on 7 June 1993. At the time, it was to be Osbourne's final album following his final tour before retiring, aptly titled "No More Tours". The track "Black Sabbath" featured a reunion of the original line-up of Black Sabbath, Osbourne's former band, in which the other members were invited to join Ozzy as guest stars for the Costa Mesa Reunion shows. Other songs were performed by the original Black Sabbath lineup, but were not included in this release.

In addition to the standard release in a '"fat-boy" two-CD case, the album was released as a digipak with a metal speaker grille cover and included tattoos, as well as the booklet; the official release was preceded by a single CD sampler issued as a promotional item.

A DVD of Live & Loud was also issued, one of the first music compilations released in that format. The DVD is a compilation of live footage from several shows rather than a single concert: this is evident as Osbourne can be seen both shirtless and wearing different clothes during the same song, while guitarist Zakk Wylde can be seen playing up to three different guitars in the same song. The live recordings in the CD (with the exclusion of Wylde's guitar solo and Castillo's drum solo) are used as the soundtrack for the collage of performances in the video release, the only difference being in the selection of speeches with which Osbourne introduces some of the songs.

In 1994, Osbourne won a Grammy Award for Best Metal Performance for the live version of "I Don't Want to Change the World", featured on this album.

Due to ongoing legal litigation regarding song writing credits for the track "Shot In The Dark", this album, along with The Ultimate Sin and Just Say Ozzy (both of which also included the song), were not remastered and reissued along with the rest of Ozzy's back catalog in 2002. However, the Grammy-winning live track, "I Don't Want to Change the World" from Live & Loud did appear on The Essential Ozzy Osbourne compilation released in 2003.

== Track listing ==
Disc one
No.	Title	Writer(s)	Recorded	Length
1.	"Intro"		Orlando Arena, Orlando, Florida - August 16, 1992	3:12
2.	"Paranoid"	Ozzy Osbourne; Tony Iommi; Geezer Butler; Bill Ward	Orlando Arena, Orlando, Florida - August 16, 1992	3:17
3.	"I Don't Want to Change the World"	Osbourne; Zakk Wylde; Randy Castillo; Lemmy Kilmister	Orlando Arena, Orlando, Florida - August 16, 1992	5:03
4.	"Desire"	Osbourne; Wylde; Castillo; Kilmister	Orlando Arena, Orlando, Florida - August 16, 1992	6:00
5.	"Mr. Crowley"	Osbourne; Randy Rhoads; Bob Daisley	Orlando Arena, Orlando, Florida - August 16, 1992	6:25
6.	"I Don't Know"	Osbourne; Rhoads; Daisley	Orlando Arena, Orlando, Florida - August 16, 1992	5:12
7.	"Road to Nowhere"	Osbourne; Wylde; Castillo	Orlando Arena, Orlando, Florida - August 16, 1992	5:30
8.	"Flying High Again"	Osbourne; Rhoads; Daisley; Lee Kerslake	Coca-Cola Lakewood Amphitheatre, Atlanta, Georgia - August 18, 1992	5:03
9.	"Guitar Solo"	Wylde	Miami Arena, Miami, Florida - August 14, 1992	4:43
10.	"Suicide Solution"	Osbourne; Rhoads; Daisley	Miami Arena, Miami, Florida - August 14, 1992	5:02
11.	"Goodbye to Romance"	Osbourne; Rhoads; Daisley	Cincinnati Gardens, Cincinnati, Ohio - August 20, 1992	6:18

Disc two
No.	Title	Writer(s)	Recorded	Length
1.	"Shot in the Dark"	Osbourne; Phil Soussan	Cincinnati Gardens, Cincinnati, Ohio - August 20, 1992	6:36
2.	"No More Tears"	Osbourne; Wylde; Mike Inez; Castillo; John Purdell	Miami Arena, Miami, Florida - August 14, 1992	7:50
3.	"Miracle Man"	Osbourne; Wylde; Daisley	Coca-Cola Lakewood Amphitheatre, Atlanta, Georgia - August 18, 1992	4:58
4.	"Drum Solo"	Castillo	Coca-Cola Lakewood Amphitheatre, Atlanta, Georgia - August 18, 1992	2:52
5.	"War Pigs"	Osbourne; Iommi; Butler; Ward	Cincinnati Gardens, Cincinnati, Ohio - August 20, 1992	9:17
6.	"Bark at the Moon"	Osbourne; Jake E. Lee; Daisley	Orlando Arena, Orlando, Florida - August 16, 1992	5:28
7.	"Mama, I'm Coming Home"	Osbourne; Wylde; Kilmister	Cincinnati Gardens, Cincinnati, Ohio - August 20, 1992	5:45
8.	"Crazy Train"	Osbourne; Rhoads; Daisley	Orlando Arena, Orlando, Florida - August 16, 1992	6:20
9.	"Black Sabbath" (performed by Black Sabbath)	Osbourne; Iommi; Butler; Ward	Pacific Amphitheater, Costa Mesa, California - November 15, 1992	7:12
10.	"Changes"	Osbourne; Iommi; Butler; Ward	Red Rocks Amphitheater, Morrison, Colorado - June 24, 1992	5:15

== Personnel ==
- Ozzy Osbourne – vocals
- Zakk Wylde – guitar, piano on "Changes"
- Mike Inez – bass
- Randy Castillo – drums
- Kevin Jones – keyboards

Black Sabbath (performs on "Black Sabbath")

- Ozzy Osbourne – vocals
- Tony Iommi – guitar
- Geezer Butler – bass
- Bill Ward – drums

Production

- Mixed and engineered by Michael Wagener
- Mastered by Stephen Marcussen
- Remastered by Brian Lee with Bob Ludwig
- Liner notes by Steffan Chirazi

== Charts ==
=== Album ===
Chart (1993)	Peak position
Australian Albums (ARIA)	25
Canada Top Albums/CDs (RPM)	21
Dutch Albums (Album Top 100)	55
European Albums Chart	76
Finnish Albums (The Official Finnish Charts)	34
German Albums (Offizielle Top 100)	60
New Zealand Albums (RMNZ)	34
Swedish Albums (Sverigetopplistan)	44
US Billboard 200	22

=== Singles ===
Single	Chart	Peak position
"Changes"	Mainstream Rock (Billboard)	9

== Certifications ==
Region	Certification	Certified units/sales
United States (RIAA)	Platinum	1,000,000^{^}
^{^} Shipments figures based on certification alone.

== Awards ==
36th Annual Grammy Awards

Year	Single	Category
1994	"I Don't Want to Change the World"	Best Metal Performance
