= No More Tours Tour =

1992 concert tour by Ozzy Osbourne

- Promotional tour by Ozzy Osbourne
- Location: North America
- Associated album: No More Tears
- Start date: June 9, 1992
- End date: November 15, 1992
- Legs: 1
- No. of shows: 64

Ozzy Osbourne concert chronology
- Theatre of Madness Tour (1991–1992); No More Tours Tour (1992); Retirement Sucks Tour (1995–1996)

The No More Tours Tour was the first farewell tour by English heavy metal singer Ozzy Osbourne.

== Overview ==
The tour was to be Ozzy Osbourne's last tour to spend time with his family, because he was incorrectly diagnosed with multiple sclerosis. Following the tour, Osbourne changed his mind and decided to keep touring.

The opening act a was combination of Slaughter, Ugly Kid Joe, Faster Pussycat and Motörhead before Alice in Chains took over in the fall. After touring together, Osbourne's bassist Mike Inez joined Alice in Chains on their Dirt tour and became a permanent member of the band.

Osbourne's October 1 show in San Antonio, Texas, marked his first appearance in the city since being banned in 1982 from performing in San Antonio after being arrested on a charge of public intoxication after urinating on the Alamo Cenotaph.

For the last two shows in Costa Mesa, the opening acts were Sepultura, and Black Sabbath featuring Rob Halford on vocals. On November 15, Osbourne's supposed farewell set was followed by the original line-up of Black Sabbath re-uniting live for 4 songs.

== Personnel ==
- Ozzy Osbourne – lead vocals
- Zakk Wylde – guitar
- Mike Inez – bass
- Randy Castillo – drums
- John Sinclair – keyboards

== Setlist ==
Songs played overall

1. "Paranoid" (Black Sabbath cover)
2. "I Don't Want to Change the World"
3. "Desire"
4. "Mr Crowley"
5. "I Don't Know"
6. "Snowblind" (Black Sabbath cover)
7. "Road to Nowhere"
8. "Flying High Again"
9. Zakk Wylde guitar solo
10. "Suicide Solution"
11. "Goodbye to Romance"
12. "Bloodbath in Paradise"
13. "Tattooed Dancer"
14. "Shot in the Dark"
15. "Sweet Leaf" (Black Sabbath cover)
16. "No More Tears"
17. "Miracle Man" [and Randy Castillo drum solo]
18. "War Pigs" (Black Sabbath cover) [encore]
19. "Bark at the Moon"
20. "Iron Man" (Black Sabbath cover)
21. "Mama, I'm Coming Home"
22. "Black Sabbath" (Black Sabbath cover)
23. "Changes" (Black Sabbath cover)
24. "Crazy Train"

Typical setlist

1. "Paranoid" (Black Sabbath cover)
2. "I Don't Wanna Change the World"
3. "Desire"
4. "Mr Crowley"
5. "I Don't Know"
6. "Road to Nowhere"
7. "Flying High Again"
8. Zakk Wylde guitar solo
9. "Suicide Solution"
10. "Goodbye to Romance"
11. "Shot in the Dark"
12. "No More Tears"
13. "Miracle Man" [and Randy Castillo drum solo]
14. "War Pigs" [encore]
15. "Bark at the Moon"
16. "Mama, I'm Coming Home"
17. "Crazy Train"

== Tour dates ==
Date	City	Country	Venue
June 9, 1992	Portland	United States	Portland Memorial Coliseum
June 11, 1992	Seattle	United States	Seattle Center Coliseum
June 13, 1992	Daly City	United States	Cow Palace
June 14, 1992	Sacramento	United States	Cal Expo Amphitheatre
June 16, 1992	San Diego	United States	San Diego Sports Arena
June 17, 1992	Las Vegas	United States	Thomas & Mack Center
June 19, 1992	Phoenix	United States	Desert Sky Pavilion
June 21, 1992	Salt Lake City	United States	Delta Center
June 23, 1992	Morrison	United States	Red Rocks Amphitheatre
June 24, 1992	Morrison	United States	Red Rocks Amphitheatre
June 26, 1992	Bonner Springs	United States	Sandstone Amphitheater
June 27, 1992	Maryland Heights	United States	Riverport Amphitheatre
June 29, 1992	Cedar Rapids	United States	Five Seasons Center
June 30, 1992	Omaha	United States	Omaha Civic Auditorium
July 2, 1992	Minneapolis	United States	Target Center
July 3, 1992	East Troy	United States	Alpine Valley Music Theatre
July 4, 1992	Charlevoix	United States	Castle Farms
~~July 12, 1992~~	Saratoga Springs	United States	Saratoga Performing Arts Center
~~July 13, 1992~~	Mansfield	United States	Great Woods Amphitheater
~~July 15, 1992~~	Hartford	United States	Hartford Civic Center
~~July 16, 1992~~	East Rutherford	United States	Brendan Byrne Arena
~~July 18, 1992~~	Clarkston	United States	Pine Knob Music Theater
~~July 19, 1992~~	Burgettstown	United States	Star Lake Amphitheater
~~July 21, 1992~~	Montreal	~~Canada~~	Montreal Forum
~~July 22, 1992~~	Toronto	~~Canada~~	CNE Grandstand
~~July 24, 1992~~	Richfield	United States	Richfield Coliseum
~~July 25, 1992~~	Allentown	United States	Allentown Fairgrounds Grandstand
~~July 27, 1992~~	Columbia	United States	Merriweather Post Pavilion
~~July 28, 1992~~	Philadelphia	United States	The Spectrum
~~July 30, 1992~~	Wantagh	United States	Jones Beach Theater
August 14, 1992	Miami	United States	Miami Arena
August 16, 1992	Orlando	United States	Orlando Arena
August 18, 1992	Atlanta	United States	Lakewood Amphitheatre
August 20, 1992	Cincinnati	United States	Cincinnati Gardens
August 22, 1992	Clarkston	United States	Pine Knob Music Theatre
August 23, 1992	Tinley Park	United States	World Music Theatre
August 26, 1992	Noblesville	United States	Deer Creek Music Center
August 28, 1992	Richfield	United States	Richfield Coliseum
August 30, 1992	Saratoga Springs	United States	Saratoga Performing Arts Center
September 1, 1992	Mansfield	United States	Great Woods Amphitheater
September 3, 1992	East Rutherford	United States	Brendan Byrne Arena
September 4, 1992	East Rutherford	United States	Brendan Byrne Arena
~~September 5, 1992~~	~~Columbia~~	United States	~~Merriweather Post Pavilion~~
September 7, 1992	Burgettstown	United States	Star Lake Amphitheater
~~September 11, 1992~~	~~Philadelphia~~	United States	~~Spectrum~~
~~September 12, 1992~~	~~New York City~~	United States	~~The Ritz~~
~~September 13, 1992~~	~~Buffalo~~	United States	~~Buffalo Memorial Auditorium~~
September 15, 1992	Little Rock	United States	Barton Coliseum
September 17, 1992	Allentown	United States	Allentown Fairgrounds Grandstand
September 18, 1992	Charlotte	United States	Blockbuster Pavilion Charlotte
September 19, 1992	Charlotte	United States	Blockbuster Pavilion Charlotte
September 21, 1992	Antioch	United States	Starwood Amphitheatre
September 23, 1992	Houston	United States	The Summit
September 25, 1992	Oklahoma City	United States	Oklahoma State Fairgrounds Grandstand
September 27, 1992	Lampe	United States	Swiss Villa Amphitheater
September 29, 1992	Tulsa	United States	Tulsa State Fairgrounds Pavilion
October 1, 1992	San Antonio	United States	Freeman Coliseum
October 2, 1992	San Antonio	United States	Freeman Coliseum
October 4, 1992	Austin	United States	Southpark Meadows
October 5, 1992	Dallas	United States	Starplex Amphitheatre
October 8, 1992	Oakland	United States	Oakland Arena
October 16, 1992	Denver	United States	McNichols Sports Arena
October 18, 1992	Albuquerque	United States	Tingley Coliseum
October 20, 1992	El Paso	United States	Special Events Center
October 22, 1992	New Orleans	United States	Lakefront Arena
October 23, 1992	Memphis	United States	Memphis Pyramid
October 25, 1992	Knoxville	United States	Thompson–Boling Arena
October 27, 1992	Louisville	United States	Freedom Hall
October 29, 1992	Valley Center	United States	Kansas Coliseum
October 30, 1992	Des Moines	United States	Des Moines Civic Center
November 1, 1992	Normal	United States	Redbird Arena
November 2, 1992	Madison	United States	Dane County Veterans Memorial Coliseum
November 4, 1992	Toronto	Canada	SkyDome
November 5, 1992	Buffalo	United States	Buffalo Memorial Auditorium
November 7, 1992	Norfolk	United States	Scope Arena
November 8, 1992	Clemson	United States	Littlejohn Coliseum
November 10, 1992	Pensacola	United States	Pensacola Civic Center
November 11, 1992	Shreveport	United States	Hirsch Memorial Coliseum
November 14, 1992	Costa Mesa	United States	Pacific Amphitheatre
November 15, 1992	Costa Mesa	United States	Pacific Amphitheatre
