= No More Tours II =

2018 concert tour by Ozzy Osbourne

- Tour by Ozzy Osbourne
- Location: Asia; Europe; North America; South America
- Start date: 27 April 2018
- End date: 31 December 2018
- Legs: 5
- No. of shows: 41

Ozzy Osbourne concert chronology
- Ozzy and Friends Tour (2012; 2015); No More Tours II (2018); Back to the Beginning (2025)

No More Tours II was the second farewell and final solo concert tour by English heavy metal singer Ozzy Osbourne, the first being No More Tours Tour in 1992.

== Background ==
The tour's South American and European legs were announced in November 2017. In the press release, he stated that it would be his final world tour, but didn't rule out the possibility of one-off shows later on. North American tour dates were announced in February 2018.

On 29 January 2019, it was announced through Osbourne's website that the European leg of the tour was to be postponed until later in the year due to illness, and would resume in Australia in March, but this leg of the tour was cancelled. The European leg of the tour was rescheduled for September. Osbourne was due to start his 2020 North American Tour in May, but on 17 February 2020, Osbourne cancelled the tour as he was scheduled to go to Switzerland in April to undergo medical treatment which would last six to eight weeks.

Due to the COVID-19 pandemic and Osbourne's health resulting in the cancellation of performances in 2019 and 2020, Osbourne would have resumed touring again in 2023, following the postponement of the 2022 shows. However, on 1 February 2023, it was announced that, due to Osbourne not sufficiently recovering from medical treatment, that he would retire from touring, cancelling the planned 2023 dates.

== Set list ==
This set list is from the Allentown concert on 30 August 2018. It is not intended to represent all shows from the tour.

1. "Bark at the Moon"
2. "Mr. Crowley"
3. "I Don't Know"
4. "Fairies Wear Boots" (Black Sabbath cover)
5. "Suicide Solution"
6. "No More Tears"
7. "Road To Nowhere"
8. "War Pigs" (Black Sabbath cover)
9. "Miracle Man" / "Crazy Babies" / "Desire" / "Perry Mason" (Zakk Wylde guitar solo medley)
10. Drum Solo
11. "I Don't Want to Change the World"
12. "Shot in the Dark"
13. "Crazy Train"

Encore

14. "Mama, I'm Coming Home"
15. "Paranoid" (Black Sabbath cover)

== Tour dates ==
List of 2018 concerts
Date	City	Country	Venue	Opening acts
27 April 2018	Jacksonville	United States	Welcome to Rockville	—N/a
29 April 2018	Sunrise	United States	Fort Rock	—N/a
5 May 2018	Mexico City	Mexico	Hell & Heaven Metal Fest	—N/a
8 May 2018	Santiago	Chile	Movistar Arena	—N/a
11 May 2018	Buenos Aires	Argentina	Estadio Obras Sanitarias	—N/a
13 May 2018	São Paulo	Brazil	Allianz Parque	—N/a
16 May 2018	Curitiba	Brazil	Pedreira Paulo Leminski	—N/a
18 May 2018	Belo Horizonte	Brazil	Mineirão	—N/a
20 May 2018	Rio de Janeiro	Brazil	Jeunesse Arena	—N/a
1 June 2018	Moscow	Russia	Olympic Stadium	—N/a
3 June 2018	Saint Petersburg	Russia	Ice Palace	—N/a
6 June 2018	Hyvinkää	Finland	Rockfest	—N/a
8 June 2018	Norje	Sweden	Sweden Rock Festival	—N/a
10 June 2018	Donington	England	Download Festival	—N/a
13 June 2018	Prague	Czech Republic	Prague Rocks	—N/a
15 June 2018	Brétigny-sur-Orge	France	Download Festival	—N/a
17 June 2018	Florence	Italy	Firenze Rocks	—N/a
20 June 2018	Halden	Norway	Tons of Rock Festival	—N/a
22 June 2018	Copenhagen	Denmark	Copenhell	—N/a
24 June 2018	Dessel	Belgium	Graspop Metal Meeting	—N/a
26 June 2018	Kraków	Poland	Impact Festival	—N/a
28 June 2018	Oberhausen	Germany	König Pilsener Arena	Kadavar
30 June 2018	Madrid	Spain	Download Festival	—N/a
2 July 2018	Lisbon	Portugal	Altice Arena	Judas Priest
5 July 2018	Barcelona	Spain	Barcelona Rock Fest	—N/a
8 July 2018	Rishon LeZion	Israel	Live Park	Orphaned Land
30 August 2018	Allentown	United States	PPL Center	Stone Sour
1 September 2018	Syracuse	United States	Lakeview Amphitheater	Stone Sour
4 September 2018	Toronto	Canada	Budweiser Stage	Stone Sour
6 September 2018	Mansfield	United States	Xfinity Center	Stone Sour
8 September 2018	Wantagh	United States	Jones Beach Theater	Stone Sour
10 September 2018	Holmdel	United States	PNC Bank Arts Center	Stone Sour
12 September 2018	Camden	United States	BB&T Pavilion	Stone Sour
14 September 2018	Bristow	United States	Jiffy Lube Live	Stone Sour
16 September 2018	Cuyahoga Falls	United States	Blossom Music Center	Stone Sour
19 September 2018	Clarkston	United States	DTE Energy Music Theatre	Stone Sour
21 September 2018	Tinley Park	United States	Hollywood Casino Amphitheatre	Stone Sour
23 September 2018	Noblesville	United States	Ruoff Home Mortgage Music Center	Stone Sour
26 September 2018	Dallas	United States	Dos Equis Pavilion	Stone Sour
28 September 2018	The Woodlands	United States	Cynthia Woods Mitchell Pavilion	Stone Sour
30 September 2018	Albuquerque	United States	Isleta Amphitheater	Stone Sour
2 October 2018	Denver	United States	Pepsi Center	Stone Sour
4 October 2018	West Valley City	United States	USANA Amphitheatre	Stone Sour
31 December 2018	Inglewood	United States	Ozzfest	—N/a

=== Cancelled tour dates ===
After West Valley City, Osbourne would perform closer to his Los Angeles home, in Mountain View, San Diego, Las Vegas and the Hollywood Bowl. However, the same night of the first concert, October 6, Osbourne was hospitalized for two fingers that had gone from pained to unnaturally swollen, which were discovered to have gotten a staphylococcal infection, owing to injuries that did not heal due to the Decadron Osbourne was taking to ensure consistent vocals. The infection was removed through surgery and the four concerts were delayed to the following week, but during recovery further operations were necessary, keeping Osbourne hospitalized for the whole week and ultimately cancelling the dates.

Following his Ozzfest performance on New Year's Eve, Osbourne planned to restart the tour with a concert in Dublin on late January, followed by six English dates, including one at London's O2 Arena, nine concerts in Europe, two in Australia, two in New Zealand, and headlining the Japanese version of Download Festival in March. Afterwards there was a North American leg with 27 dates, followed by performances where the cancelled October concerts would happen. However, Osbourne caught influenza that evolved into bronchitis and pneumonia, forcing a postponement. The new plan had Osbourne leaving in March to do the Australia, New Zealand and Japan concerts followed by the North American dates. But in February Osbourne fell in his house and injured his neck and clavicle, leading to surgery and cancelling all his 2019 performances, that would be rescheduled to 2020. Once 2020 started, the COVID-19 pandemic and Osbourne's medical treatment kept postponing the tour, and Osbourne ultimately announced in January 2023 that he was cancelling the concerts altogether.

Date	City	Country	Venue
13 October 2018	Las Vegas	United States	MGM Grand Garden Arena
15 October 2018	Los Angeles	United States	Hollywood Bowl
18 October 2018	San Diego	United States	Mattress Firm Amphitheatre
20 October 2018	Mountain View	United States	Shoreline Amphitheatre
18 March 2019	Chiba	Japan	Makuhari Messe
29 May 2019	Atlanta	United States	State Farm Arena
31 May 2019	Sunrise	United States	Amerant Bank Arena
6 June 2020	Hershey	United States	Hersheypark Stadium
3 May 2023	Helsinki	Finland	Hartwall Arena
5 May 2023	Stockholm	Sweden	Friends Arena
7 May 2023	Dortmund	Germany	Westfalenhallen
10 May 2023	Madrid	Spain	WiZink Center
12 May 2023	Bologna	Italy	Unipol Arena
14 May 2023	Munich	Germany	Olympiahalle
17 May 2023	Budapest	Hungary	László Papp Budapest Sports Arena
19 May 2023	Prague	Czech Republic	O2 Arena Prague
21 May 2023	Zurich	Switzerland	Hallenstadion
24 May 2023	Hamburg	Germany	Barclaycard Arena
26 May 2023	Mannheim	Germany	SAP Arena
28 May 2023	Berlin	Germany	Mercedes-Benz Arena
31 May 2023	Nottingham	England	Motorpoint Arena Nottingham
2 June 2023	Newcastle	England	Utilita Arena
4 June 2023	Glasgow	Scotland	OVO Hydro
7 June 2023	Manchester	England	AO Arena
10 June 2023	Dublin	Ireland	3Arena
12 June 2023	London	England	The O_{2} Arena
14 June 2023	Birmingham	England	Resorts World Arena

== Personnel ==
- Ozzy Osbourne – lead vocals
- Zakk Wylde – lead guitar, backing vocals
- Rob "Blasko" Nicholson – bass
- Tommy Clufetos – drums
- Adam Wakeman – keyboards and synthesizers, rhythm guitar, backing vocals
