= No More Tears (Ozzy Osbourne song) =

Single by Ozzy Osbourne

from the album No More Tears
- B-side: "S.I.N."; "Don't Blame Me"; "Party with the Animals"
- Released: 16 September 1991
- Genre: Heavy metal; glam metal; progressive rock
- Length: 7:23 (album version); 5:54 (The Ozzman Cometh edit-single version)
- Label: Epic
- Songwriters: Ozzy Osbourne; Zakk Wylde; Mike Inez; Randy Castillo; John Purdell
- Producers: John Purdell; Duane Baron

Ozzy Osbourne singles chronology
"Close My Eyes Forever" (1989)	"No More Tears" (1991)	"I Don't Want to Change the World" (1991)

Music video
- "No More Tears" on YouTube

"No More Tears" is the fifth song and title track on the 1991 Ozzy Osbourne album No More Tears. It reached number five on the U.S. Mainstream Rock Tracks chart, number 71 on the Billboard Hot 100, number 16 on the Dutch Top 40 chart and number 32 on the UK Singles Chart.

== Overview ==
The song originated from a jam session, according to guitarist Zakk Wylde: "We were just messing around in rehearsals. Mike started jamming that on the bass, then Randy started playing drums, and then John started doing that keyboard bit." Osbourne considers this song to be "a gift from God", as stated in the Prince of Darkness liner notes.

A shorter edited version of this song was released to some radio stations, and can be heard on the 1997 compilation album The Ozzman Cometh. The full-length version appears on The Essential Ozzy Osbourne.

== Theme ==
In the 2002 remaster booklet for the No More Tears album, Osbourne stated that the song was about a serial killer.

In the 27 September 2018 issue of Weekly Alibi, while texting with music critic August March, Osbourne claimed he wrote the song while in Albuquerque, New Mexico.

== Music video ==
The video consists of Osbourne singing alone at times and with his backing band at others, intercut with footage of a woman (model and actress Mariah O'Brien) entering a room, sitting in a chair, and crying until she is completely submerged in her own tears. The video was shot to accommodate both the album version and the edited version of the song. Some channels played the full-length video, and others played the shortened version. Osbourne's daughter Kelly is seen at the end of the video in an angel costume lip-syncing the words at the end of the song, "It's just a hand in the bush," which repeats until the video fades out.

== Critical reception ==
Richard Gilliam of AllMusic wrote "the song has precisely the sort of hard, rhythmic drive that marks good heavy metal" and "Osbourne's sharply edged vocals are among the strongest of his solo efforts" but "near the end of the song there’s a pointlessly overproduced art-rock bridge that mars the song’s otherwise fine dynamic flow."

Consequence of Sound called it, "a successful song indebted to both glam metal and prog rock released the same year as Nirvana's Nevermind", and ranked it as the best song on the album, with "Mama I'm Coming Home", as "a close second".

== Releases ==
- 7" single, 1991, Epic Associated Records. Additional track is "S.I.N." Catalog #35-73973 for US.
- 7" single, 1991, Epic/Sony. Additional track is "S.I.N." Not available in the US.
- CD single, 1991, Epic/Sony. Special UK package. CD single in an embossed CD wallet with room for each solo studio record. Each sleeve has a different picture. Additional tracks are "S.I.N." and "Party with the Animals".
- CD single, 1991, Epic/Sony. Promo only version, one track.
- 12" picture disc, 1991, Epic/Sony. Additional tracks are "S.I.N." and "Party with the Animals". Not available in the US.
- CD single, 1991, Epic/Sony. "Maxi single" with "No More Tears", "S.I.N.", "Don't Blame Me", and "Party with the Animals".

== Personnel ==
- Ozzy Osbourne – vocals
- Zakk Wylde – guitars, slide guitar
- Bob Daisley – bass guitar
- John Sinclair – keyboards, piano
- Randy Castillo – drums

== Charts ==
=== Weekly charts ===
Chart (1991–1992)	Peak position
Canada Top Singles (RPM)	73
Netherlands (Dutch Top 40 Tipparade)	16
Netherlands (Single Top 100)	14
UK Singles (Official Charts)	32
US Billboard Hot 100	71
US Mainstream Rock	5

2025 chart performance for "No More Tears"
Chart (2025)	Peak position
Austria (Ö3 Austria Top 40)	66
Czech Republic Singles Digital (ČNS IFPI)	40
Global 200 (Billboard)	56
Lithuania (AGATA)	95
New Zealand (Recorded Music NZ)	36
Norway (IFPI Norge)	53
Sweden (Sverigetopplistan)	51
UK Rock & Metal (Official Charts)	5
US Hot Rock & Alternative Songs (Billboard)	9

=== Year-end charts ===
Year-end chart performance for "No More Tears"
Chart (2025)	Position
US Hot Rock & Alternative Songs (Billboard)	97

== Certifications ==
Certifications for "No More Tears"
Region	Certification	Certified units/sales
Canada (Music Canada)	Platinum	80,000^{‡}
New Zealand (RMNZ)	Platinum	30,000^{‡}
United Kingdom (BPI)	Silver	200,000^{‡}
^{‡} Sales+streaming figures based on certification alone.
