= I Don't Want to Change the World =

Promotional single by Ozzy Osbourne

from the album No More Tears
- Released: September 17, 1991
- Recorded: 1990
- Genre: Heavy metal
- Length: 4:07
- Label: Epic
- Songwriters: Ozzy Osbourne; Zakk Wylde; Randy Castillo; Lemmy Kilmister
- Producers: Duane Baron; John Purdell

"I Don't Want to Change the World" is a heavy metal song by Ozzy Osbourne. It first appeared as the second track of the album No More Tears.

Though the song was not released as a commercial single, in Britain the song was released as a promotional 12" single and a CD single (Epic XPCD 172/XPR 1745) with the tracks:

1. "I Don't Want to Change the World" – 04:07
2. "Mama, I'm Coming Home" – 04:12
3. "No More Tears" – 07:24

== Live version ==
Two years later, the song appeared in a live version on the album Live & Loud (1993). This version won Best Metal Performance at the 36th Annual Grammy Awards.
