= Just Say Ozzy =

EP (Live) by Ozzy Osbourne
- Released: 6 February 1990
- Recorded: November 1989
- Venue: Brixton Academy (London)
- Genre: Heavy metal
- Length: 30:05
- Label: Epic/CBS
- Producer: Andy Johns

Ozzy Osbourne chronology
| Ten Commandments (1990) | Just Say Ozzy (1990) | No More Tears (1991) |

Professional ratings
Review scores
| Source | Rating |
|---|---|
| AllMusic | 2/5 stars |

Just Say Ozzy is a live EP by Ozzy Osbourne. It was released in the United States on 6 February 1990 and in the United Kingdom on 5 March 1990 and entered the UK charts on 17 March, reaching number 69. The EP was remastered and reissued on 22 August 1995.

== Overview ==
The sleeve states that Just Say Ozzy was recorded at London's Brixton Academy in November 1989.

Just Say Ozzy was remastered in 1995, along with the rest of the singer's catalogue. However, the EP —along with Speak of the Devil, The Ultimate Sin and Live & Loud —has since been deleted from Ozzy's catalogue and was not remastered and reissued with the rest of Ozzy's catalogue in 2002. This is mainly due to a continuing legal struggle with bassist/songwriter Phil Soussan over the song "Shot in the Dark".

Just Say Ozzy peaked at number 58 on the Billboard 200 and was certified Gold on July 21, 1993.

The tracks "Sweet Leaf" and "War Pigs" were composed and originally recorded by Black Sabbath, the group Osbourne fronted in the 1970s.

Guitarist Zakk Wylde can be seen on the cover of the record spraying "Ozzy" on the wall.

== Track listing ==
| No. | Title | Writer(s) | Length |
|---|---|---|---|
| 1. | "Miracle Man" | Ozzy Osbourne, Zakk Wylde, Bob Daisley | 4:01 |
| 2. | "Bloodbath in Paradise" | Osbourne, Wylde, Daisley, Randy Castillo, John Sinclair | 5:00 |
| 3. | "Shot in the Dark" | Osbourne, Phil Soussan | 5:33 |
| 4. | "Tattooed Dancer" | Osbourne, Wylde, Daisley | 3:47 |
| 5. | "Sweet Leaf" | Osbourne, Tony Iommi, Geezer Butler, Bill Ward | 3:22 |
| 6. | "War Pigs" | Osbourne, Iommi, Butler, Ward | 8:24 |

== Personnel ==
- Ozzy Osbourne - vocals
- Zakk Wylde - guitar
- Geezer Butler - bass
- Randy Castillo - drums
- John Sinclair- keyboards

Production

- Andy Johns - producer, engineer, mixing
- Sally Browder - assistant engineer
- Vlado Meller - mastering
- Brian Lee and Bob Ludwig - 1995 remastering

== Charts ==
| Chart (1990) | Peak position |
|---|---|
| Finnish Albums (The Official Finnish Charts) | 18 |
| UK Albums (Official Charts) | 69 |
| US Billboard 200 | 58 |

== Certifications ==
| Region | Certification | Certified units/sales |
|---|---|---|
| United States (RIAA) | Gold | 500,000^{^} |
^{^} Shipments figures based on certification alone.
