= No Rest for the Wicked (Ozzy Osbourne album) =

- Cover photography by Bob Carlos Clarke

Studio album by Ozzy Osbourne
- Released: 28 September 1988
- Recorded: 1988
- Studios: Enterprise Studios (Los Angeles) and Goodnight L.A. Studios, Van Nuys, U.S.
- Genres: Heavy metal; glam metal
- Length: 43:08
- Label: Epic/CBS
- Producers: Roy Thomas Baker; Keith Olsen

Ozzy Osbourne chronology
Tribute (1987)	No Rest for the Wicked (1988)	Best of Ozz (1989)

Singles from No Rest for the Wicked
- 1. "Miracle Man" Released: 24 October 1988; 2. "Crazy Babies" Released: February 1989

Professional ratings
Review scores
Source	Rating
AllMusic	4/5 stars
Martin Popoff	9/10
Rolling Stone	1/5 stars

No Rest for the Wicked is the fifth solo studio album by the English heavy metal singer Ozzy Osbourne, released in September 1988 in the United States and in October 1988 in the United Kingdom. The album was certified gold in December 1988 and has since gone double platinum. It peaked at number 13 on the Billboard 200. It was the first album to feature guitarist Zakk Wylde, keyboardist John Sinclair and the first to feature bassist Bob Daisley since Bark at the Moon.

== Overview ==
Osbourne wanted to work with producer Roy Thomas Baker after he was impressed by the drum sounds achieved on Slade's 1987 album You Boyz Make Big Noize, which Baker co-produced.

No Rest for the Wicked is the recording debut of lead guitarist Zakk Wylde. After firing lead guitarist Jake E. Lee in 1987, Osbourne received a demo tape from Wylde and later hired him after an audition.

Bassist/lyricist Bob Daisley made his return to Osbourne's band after the two had a falling out in 1985. Once the album's recording was complete, Daisley was once again out, replaced by Osbourne's former Black Sabbath bandmate Geezer Butler for subsequent promotional tours.

"Miracle Man", "Crazy Babies", and "Breaking All the Rules" were released as singles with accompanying music videos. The song "Hero" was an unlisted hidden bonus track on the original 1988 CD and cassette releases. The song "Miracle Man" was a pointed barb aimed at televangelist Jimmy Swaggart. Swaggart had long been critical of Osbourne's music and live performances, before he himself was involved in a 1988 prostitution scandal. The song "Bloodbath in Paradise" references Charles Manson and the Manson Family murders.

Creative Director John Carver was hired by Osbourne's management (his wife Sharon) to conceptualize and direct the album sleeve for "No Rest For the Wicked". Carver's concept was to portray Osbourne as Jesus Christ, with photographer Bob Carlos Clarke taking the cover photo.

== Track listing ==
Standard Edition
No.	Title	Writer(s)	Length
1.	"Miracle Man"	Ozzy Osbourne; Zakk Wylde; Bob Daisley	3:44
2.	"Devil's Daughter"	Osbourne; Wylde; John Sinclair; Randy Castillo; Daisley	5:15
3.	"Crazy Babies"	Osbourne; Wylde; Castillo; Daisley	4:15
4.	"Breakin' All the Rules"	Osbourne; Daisley; Wylde; Sinclair; Castillo	5:15
5.	"Bloodbath in Paradise"	Osbourne; Wylde; Sinclair; Castillo; Daisley	5:03
6.	"Fire in the Sky"	Osbourne; Wylde; Sinclair; Castillo; Daisley	6:24
7.	"Tattooed Dancer"	Osbourne; Wylde; Daisley	3:53
8.	"Demon Alcohol"	Osbourne; Wylde; Castillo; Daisley	4:30
9.	"Hero"	Osbourne; Daisley; Wylde; Sinclair; Castillo	4:49
Total length:			43:08

2002 reissue bonus tracks
No.	Title	Writer(s)	Length
10.	"The Liar" (originally on 1988 Japanese release only)	Osbourne; Sinclair; Daisley	4:32
11.	"Miracle Man" (recorded live at the Tower Theatre, Upper Darby Township, PA, 4 June 1989)		3:48
Total length:			51:28

== Personnel ==
- Ozzy Osbourne – vocals
- Zakk Wylde – guitar
- Bob Daisley – bass guitar
- Randy Castillo – drums

Additional musician

- John Sinclair – keyboards

Production

- Produced by Roy Thomas Baker and Keith Olsen, except "Miracle Man" and "Devil's Daughter", which were produced by Keith Olsen
- Recorded and engineered by Roy Thomas Baker, Gordon Fordyce and Gerry Napier
- Mixed by Keith Olsen
- 2002 reissue produced by Bruce Dickinson
- 2002 remastering by Chris Athens

== Charts ==
Chart (1988)	Peak position
Australian Albums (Kent Music Report)	40
European Albums Chart	47
German Albums (Offizielle Top 100)	29
Finnish Albums (The Official Finnish Charts)	7
Norwegian Albums (VG-lista)	12
Swedish Albums (Sverigetopplistan)	18
Swiss Albums (Schweizer Hitparade)	26
UK Albums (Official Charts)	23
US Billboard 200	13

== Certifications ==
Region	Certification	Certified units/sales
Canada (Music Canada)	Platinum	100,000^{^}
United States (RIAA)	2× Platinum	2,000,000^{^}
^{^} Shipments figures based on certification alone.
