= John Sinclair (musician) =

- Born: John Terence Sinclair; 12 April 1952 (age 74); Wembley, London, England
- Genres: Pop, rock, hard rock, progressive rock, heavy metal
- Occupation: Keyboardist
- Instruments: Keyboards, vocals
- Years active: 1970–present
- Labels: Virgin, Atlantic
- Website: Official Website

John Sinclair (born 12 April 1952) is an English keyboardist who has played for bands such as The Babys, Heavy Metal Kids, Savoy Brown, The Cult, but is probably best known for his time in Uriah Heep and playing for Ozzy Osbourne's band. He also is credited with styling keyboard parts for This Is Spinal Tap.

Sinclair is now a qualified hypnotherapist.

== Discography ==
=== With Heavy Metal Kids ===
- Kitsch (1977)
- Chelsea Kids (1987)

=== With Babys ===
- Head First (1978)

=== With Lion ===
- Running All Night (1980)

=== With Savoy Brown ===
- Rock 'n' Roll Warriors (1981)
- Raw Live 'n' Blue (2001)

=== With Uriah Heep ===
- Abominog (1982)

Tour Instruments - Prophet 5 Polyphonic Synthesizer, Mellotron M400, Hammond B3 with modified 122 Leslie cabinet (Crown DC 300 Amp and JBL 15" speaker)

- Head First (1983)
- Equator (1985)

=== With Spinal Tap ===
- This Is Spinal Tap (1984)

=== With Shy ===
- Brave the Storm (1985)

=== With Ozzy Osbourne ===
- No Rest for the Wicked (1988)
- Just Say Ozzy (live 1989) (1990)
- No More Tears (1991)
- The Ozzman Cometh (compilation) (1997)
- Live at Budokan (live) (2002)
- Prince of Darkness (compilation box set) (2005)

=== With Cozy Powell ===
- The Drums Are Back (1992)

=== With The Cult ===
- Pure Cult (1993)

=== With Richard Grieco ===
- Waiting for the Sky to Fall (1995)

=== With Black Sabbath ===
- Under Wheels of Confusion 1970–1987 (1996)

=== With Roadway ===
- The EP (2011)

=== With Dunmore ===
- Dunmore
