= Shot in the Dark (Ozzy Osbourne song) =

Single by Ozzy Osbourne

from the album The Ultimate Sin
- B-side: "Rock 'n' Roll Rebel"
- Released: 20 January 1986 (UK)
- Genre: Glam metal
- Length: 4:26
- Label: CBS Associated
- Songwriters: Ozzy Osbourne; Phil Soussan
- Producer: Ron Nevison

Ozzy Osbourne singles chronology
"So Tired" (1983)	"Shot in the Dark" (1986)	"The Ultimate Sin" (1986)

"Shot in the Dark" is a song recorded and performed by English heavy metal singer Ozzy Osbourne. It is the ninth and final track on his 1986 album The Ultimate Sin. A top-ten hit on mainstream rock radio, the song also became his first single to chart on the Billboard Hot 100, peaking at number 68. The official music video for the song was directed by Andy Morahan, and was played in power rotation on MTV.

== Composition history ==
"Shot in the Dark" was originally composed sometime around 1983 by members of Wildlife, a band featuring Steve Overland, Chris Overland, Simon Kirke of Bad Company, keyboardist Mark Booty, and future Ozzy Osbourne bassist Phil Soussan. Wildlife recorded a demo version of the song that was never officially released. When Soussan joined Osbourne's band a couple of years later, he and Osbourne then reworked the song for the latter's recording and release in early 1986, with Osbourne supposedly writing new lyrics. However, there is ambiguity in terms of which parts of the original Wildlife version were left intact in Osbourne's rendition, and as a result, there has been much debate over the proper authorship of the song. Although the writing is credited solely to Soussan and Osbourne on the single and its parent album, The Ultimate Sin, some question whether other members of Wildlife (the Overland brothers, in particular) deserve writing credit for Osbourne's rendition.

== Later releases and omissions ==
Despite the commercial success of "Shot in the Dark", it was notably omitted from various re-releases and further compilations after 2000, widely believed to be the result of the aforementioned authorship issues, along with other legal disputes from Soussan and predecessor bassist Bob Daisley (who was seeking songwriting credit/royalties for - ironically - every song on The Ultimate Sin, except for "Shot in the Dark"), (Note: Regardless of the fact that Daisley has explicitly stated he had nothing to do with writing "Shot in the Dark," his lawsuit likely deterred Osbourne from including any song from The Ultimate Sin (even ones Daisley didn't write) on compilations.) while Osbourne himself stated that he hated The Ultimate Sin album in general. One notable exception to the song's consistent exclusion from compilations is the original 1997 release of The Ozzman Cometh. However, the 2002 re-release of this retrospective featured the track "Miracle Man" replacing "Shot in the Dark". In addition, the song is absent from compilations such as The Essential Ozzy Osbourne, Prince of Darkness, and Memoirs of a Madman. Both the EP Just Say Ozzy, which contains a live version of the song, and the original studio album The Ultimate Sin, were officially deleted from Ozzy's catalog in 2002.

The original Ozzy Osbourne unedited studio recording of "Shot in the Dark" (4:26) appears only on the original 1986 release of The Ultimate Sin album and some releases of the 1986 single. Later reissues of albums featuring a studio version of "Shot in the Dark" (namely, the 1995 remastered edition of The Ultimate Sin and the original 1997 release of The Ozzman Cometh) have the song edited to a 4:16 version, missing four extra measures of music after the first chorus.

The original Wildlife rendition of the song was recorded and released by the Overland brothers' post-Wildlife AOR band FM on their 2012 release Only Foolin EP'.

== Track listing ==
Side A
No.	Title	Length
1.	"Shot in the Dark"	4:26

Side B
No.	Title	Length
1.	"Rock 'N' Roll Rebel"	5:28

== Charts ==
Chart (1986)	Peak position
Ireland (IRMA)	15
UK Singles (Official Charts)	20
US Billboard Hot 100	68
US Mainstream Rock (Billboard)	10
