= Mama, I'm Coming Home =

1991 single by Ozzy Osbourne

Single by Ozzy Osbourne

from the album No More Tears
- B-side: "Don't Blame Me"
- Released: 18 November 1991 (UK); February 1992 (US)
- Recorded: 1991
- Genre: Heavy metal; hard rock
- Length: 4:11
- Label: Epic
- Songwriters: Lemmy Kilmister; Ozzy Osbourne; Zakk Wylde
- Producers: John Purdell; Duane Baron

Ozzy Osbourne singles chronology
"Road to Nowhere" (1991)	"Mama, I'm Coming Home" (1991)	"Mr. Tinkertrain" (1991)

Music video
- "Mama, I’m Coming Home" on YouTube

Professional ratings
Review scores
Source	Rating
AllMusic	2.5/5 stars

"Mama, I'm Coming Home" is a power ballad by English heavy metal singer Ozzy Osbourne from Osbourne's sixth studio album No More Tears, which first released on 17 November 1991. The song features Osbourne on vocals, Zakk Wylde on guitar, Bob Daisley on bass, and Randy Castillo on drums. Lyrics were written by Lemmy. Two music videos were also produced to accompany the song's release.

The single is Osbourne's only solo Top 40 single on the Billboard Hot 100 chart in his lifetime, peaking at No. 28; his only other top 40 hits being his duet with Lita Ford, "Close My Eyes Forever", and his feature on the 2019 Post Malone song "Take What You Want", both of which peaked at number 8, while "Crazy Train" peaked at number 39, two weeks after his death on July 22, 2025. It also reached number 2 on Billboard's Mainstream Rock Tracks.

At the "Back to the Beginning" concert held on July 5, 2025, which marked Osbourne's final stage appearance, this song was the only one on Osbourne's set of 5 songs that did not belong to his debut album Blizzard of Ozz.

== Background ==
As Zakk Wylde recalled in a 2022 interview, "I remember me and Ozzy originally did that on a piano in my apartment in North Hollywood...I transposed it to guitar when we got in the studio when we were working on the record, and then y'know it sounded great...the song started off with the pedal steel kind of thing. I mean it just sounded great...I mean everybody's performances and everything like that but I mean just the overall sound of it – the guys knocked it out of the park for sure."

According to American Songwriter magazine, the lyrics are inspired by Ozzy's realization that he would be dead if he did not get sober, and the song is dedicated to his wife Sharon for staying with him during his crazier early days. Ozzy revealed that after bringing the demo to his friend Lemmy saying he was struggling to get lyrics, Lemmy said he would get them done in two hours, and once Ozzy left and returned to Lemmy's apartment five hours later, he had already written "Mama, I'm Coming Home" along with two alternate set of lyrics, knowing enough about Ozzy and Sharon to even employ her pet name of 'Mama'.

== Music videos ==
Two music videos were created for the single. The first was a surreal video that Osbourne disliked because he felt the video's plot did not match the song's concept. A second music video was then created with Samuel Bayer as its director, which subsequently augmented Osbourne's interest. Osbourne compared the effects in the second video to the hazy smoke effect seen in the video for Nirvana's "Smells Like Teen Spirit", which was also directed by Bayer.

== Personnel ==
- Ozzy Osbourne – vocals
- Zakk Wylde – guitar
- Bob Daisley – bass
- Randy Castillo – drums
- John Sinclair - keyboards

== Reception ==
Stephen Thomas Erlewine of music website AllMusic stated the song "may not appeal to Ozzy's headbanging hardcore following, but it's a very good hard rock ballad and one of his finest singles."

== Charts ==
=== Weekly charts ===
Chart (1992–1993)	Peak position
Austria (Ö3 Austria Top 40)	42
Canada Top Singles (RPM)	43
Germany (GfK)	27
New Zealand (Recorded Music NZ)	48
Switzerland (Schweizer Hitparade)	62
UK Singles (Official Charts)	46
US Billboard Hot 100	28
US Mainstream Rock	2

2025 chart performance for "Mama, I'm Coming Home"
Chart (2025)	Peak position
Canada Hot 100 (Billboard)	36
Czech Republic Singles Digital (ČNS IFPI)	9
Global 200 (Billboard)	45
Greece International (IFPI)	94
New Zealand (Recorded Music NZ)	25
Norway (IFPI Norge)	30
Russia Streaming (TopHit)	95
Slovakia Singles Digital (ČNS IFPI)	33
Sweden (Sverigetopplistan)	20
UK Singles Chart (OCC)	45
UK Rock & Metal (Official Charts)	4
US Billboard Hot 100	48
US Hot Rock & Alternative Songs (Billboard)	6

=== Year-end charts ===
Year-end chart performance for "Mama, I'm Coming Home"
Chart (2025)	Position
US Hot Rock & Alternative Songs (Billboard)	85

== Certifications ==
Region	Certification	Certified units/sales
Canada (Music Canada)	Platinum	80,000^{‡}
New Zealand (RMNZ)	Platinum	30,000^{‡}
^{‡} Sales+streaming figures based on certification alone.
