= No More Tears =

- Cover photography by Matt Mahurin

Studio album by Ozzy Osbourne
- Released: 17 September 1991
- Recorded: 1990–1991
- Studios: A&M and Devonshire, Los Angeles
- Genres: Heavy metal; hard rock
- Length: 57:02
- Label: Epic Associated
- Producers: Duane Baron; John Purdell

Ozzy Osbourne chronology
Just Say Ozzy (1990)	No More Tears (1991)	Live & Loud (1993)

Singles from No More Tears
- 1. "No More Tears" Released: 16 September 1991; 2. "Mama, I'm Coming Home" Released: 18 November 1991

No More Tears is the sixth studio album by the English heavy metal singer Ozzy Osbourne. Released on 17 September 1991 in the United States and on 7 October 1991 in the United Kingdom. The album charted at number 17 on the UK Albums Chart and number seven on the US Billboard 200 albums chart. No More Tears spawned four singles which reached the top ten of the US Hot Mainstream Rock Tracks chart, including the number two "Mama, I'm Coming Home", and the Grammy-winning track "I Don't Want to Change the World", both of which were co-written with Motörhead frontman Lemmy Kilmister. Along with 1980's Blizzard of Ozz it is one of Osbourne's two best-selling solo albums in North America, having been certified quadruple platinum by the RIAA and double platinum by Music Canada. It was Osbourne's final album to feature drummer Randy Castillo and longtime bassist and songwriter Bob Daisley.

== Background ==
Guitarist Zakk Wylde contributed songwriting to the album, while Motörhead bassist/vocalist Lemmy Kilmister wrote the lyrics for six songs; however, only four were used on the album. Lemmy would say to Osbourne he earned more in publishing royalties from those four songs than with the entire Motörhead catalogue that far. Although Mike Inez appeared in the album's videos and promotional tours, long-time Osbourne collaborator Bob Daisley plays bass on the entire album. Inez is credited as a writer for the title track; although he does not perform on the actual recording, the intro bass riff was composed by him.

The 2002 reissue of No More Tears featured two additional tracks entitled "Don't Blame Me" and "Party with the Animals". Both tracks had originally been released in 1991 as B-sides. The version of "Don't Blame Me" on the 2002 reissue contains a different set of lyrics than the original b-side. The original b-side version can be found on the single and the original Japanese pressing of the CD.

According to professional wrestler and Fozzy lead singer Chris Jericho, when asked about the title of the song "A.V.H.", Osbourne told him it stands for "Aston Villa Highway", a homage to the football team he and his Black Sabbath bandmates followed as young men growing up in Birmingham.

== Reception ==
Professional ratings
Review scores
Source	Rating
AllMusic	4/5 stars
Entertainment Weekly	B+
Metal Hammer	4/5 stars
Pitchfork	8.1/10

No More Tears received positive reviews from critics, and is considered to be one of Osbourne's best albums. Loudwire ranked the album No. 22 on their list of "Top 90 Hard Rock + Metal Albums of the '90s". Ultimate Classic Rock included No More Tears on their list "Top 100 '90s Rock Albums". They also considered it to be Osbourne's third best album, only behind his first two solo albums Blizzard of Ozz (1980) and Diary of a Madman (1981). Classic Rock also considered it to be Osbourne's third best album.

== Track listing ==
All tracks are written by Ozzy Osbourne, Zakk Wylde and Randy Castillo.

Standard edition
No.	Title	Writer(s)	Length
1.	"Mr. Tinkertrain"		5:55
2.	"I Don't Want to Change the World"	Osbourne; Wylde; Castillo; Lemmy Kilmister	4:06
3.	"Mama, I'm Coming Home"	Osbourne; Wylde; Kilmister	4:11
4.	"Desire"	Osbourne; Wylde; Castillo; Kilmister	5:46
5.	"No More Tears"	Osbourne; Wylde; Castillo; Mike Inez; John Purdell	7:24
6.	"S.I.N." (also known as "Won't Be Coming Home (S.I.N.)")		4:47
7.	"Hellraiser"	Osbourne; Wylde; Kilmister	4:52
8.	"Time After Time"	Osbourne; Wylde	4:20
9.	"Zombie Stomp"		6:14
10.	"A.V.H."		4:13
11.	"Road to Nowhere"		5:10
Total length:			57:02

2002 reissue bonus tracks
No.	Title	Length
12.	"Don't Blame Me"	5:06
13.	"Party with the Animals"	4:17
Total length:		66:25

30th Anniversary expanded edition
No.	Title	Writer(s)	Length
1.	"Mr. Tinkertrain"		5:56
2.	"I Don't Want to Change the World"	Osbourne; Wylde; Castillo; Lemmy Kilmister	4:05
3.	"Mama, I'm Coming Home"	Osbourne; Wylde; Kilmister	4:11
4.	"Desire"	Osbourne; Wylde; Castillo; Kilmister	5:45
5.	"No More Tears"	Osbourne; Wylde; Castillo; Mike Inez; John Purdell	7:25
6.	"Won't Be Coming Home (S.I.N.)"		4:47
7.	"Hellraiser"	Osbourne; Wylde; Kilmister	4:52
8.	"Time After Time"	Osbourne; Wylde	4:20
9.	"Zombie Stomp"		6:13
10.	"A.V.H."		4:13
11.	"Road to Nowhere"		5:10
12.	"Don't Blame Me"		5:00
13.	"Party with the Animals"		4:18
14.	"I Don't Want to Change the World" (demo)		3:56
15.	"Mama, I'm Coming Home" (demo)	Osbourne; Wylde; Kilmister	4:08
16.	"Desire" (demo)	Osbourne; Wylde; Castillo; Kilmister	5:00
17.	"Time After Time" (demo)	Osbourne; Wylde	4:07
18.	"Won't Be Coming Home (S.I.N.)" (demo)		4:59
19.	"Mrs J." (demo)		2:39
20.	"I Don't Want to Change the World" (live at the San Diego Sports Arena in San Diego, California, June 1992)	Osbourne; Wylde; Castillo; Kilmister	4:09
21.	"Road to Nowhere" (live at the San Diego Sports Arena in San Diego, California, June 1992)		5:23
22.	"No More Tears" (live at the San Diego Sports Arena in San Diego, California, June 1992)	Osbourne; Wylde; Castillo; Inez; Purdell	7:04
23.	"Desire" (live at the San Diego Sports Arena in San Diego, California, June 1992)	Osbourne; Wylde; Castillo; Kilmister	5:33
24.	"Mama, I'm Coming Home" (live on MTV, 1992)	Osbourne; Wylde; Kilmister	4:23
25.	"Hellraiser" (30th Anniversary Edition)	Osbourne; Wylde; Kilmister	4:55
Total length:			122:31

- The "30th Anniversary Edition" of "Hellraiser" features a mashup of vocals by Osbourne and Kilmister, the latter sourced from the Motörhead version of the song from March ör Die (1992).

== Personnel ==
- Ozzy Osbourne – vocals
- Zakk Wylde – guitars
- Bob Daisley – bass
- John Sinclair – keyboards
- Randy Castillo – drums
- Michael Inez – bass (credited, but does not play on album), inspiration/musical direction. Bass on live tracks 20–24 30th Anniversary edition
- Terry Nails – bass (tracks 14–18 30th Anniversary edition)

Production

- Duane Baron – producer, engineer
- John Purdell – producer, engineer
- Michael Bosley – engineer
- Michael Wagener – mixing
- Bob Ludwig – mastering
- Matt Mahurin – cover photography

2002 reissue information

- Bruce Dickinson – reissue executive producer
- Chris Athens – mastering at Sterling Sound

== Charts ==
Chart (1991–1992)	Peak position
Australian Albums (ARIA)	49
Austrian Albums (Ö3 Austria)	53
Canada Top Albums/CDs (RPM)	17
Dutch Albums (Album Top 100)	67
European Albums Chart	26
Finnish Albums (The Official Finnish Charts)	8
German Albums (Offizielle Top 100)	24
Japanese Albums (Oricon)	12
New Zealand Albums (RMNZ)	12
Norwegian Albums (VG-lista)	12
Swedish Albums (Sverigetopplistan)	25
Swiss Albums (Schweizer Hitparade)	37
UK Albums (Official Charts)	17
US Billboard 200	7

Chart (2021–2025)	Peak position
Belgian Albums (Ultratop Flanders)	158
Belgian Albums (Ultratop Wallonia)	116
Croatian International Albums (HDU)	39
Finnish Albums (Suomen virallinen lista)	24
German Albums (Offizielle Top 100)	25
Greek Albums (IFPI)	11
Hungarian Physical Albums (MAHASZ)	40
Icelandic Albums (Tónlistinn)	40
Lithuanian Albums (AGATA)	63
Polish Albums (ZPAV)	8
Scottish Albums (Official Charts)	38
Spanish Albums (Promusicae)	41
Swedish Albums (Sverigetopplistan)	11
UK Rock & Metal Albums (Official Charts)	9
US Top Hard Rock Albums (Billboard)	16

== Certifications ==
Region	Certification	Certified units/sales
Australia (ARIA)	Gold	35,000^{‡}
Canada (Music Canada)	2× Platinum	200,000^{^}
Japan (RIAJ)	Gold	100,000^{^}
New Zealand (RMNZ)	Gold	7,500^{‡}
United Kingdom (BPI) 2002 Release	Silver	60,000^{‡}
United States (RIAA)	4× Platinum	4,000,000^{^}
^{^} Shipments figures based on certification alone.^{‡} Sales+streaming figures based on certification alone.
