= The Ultimate Sin =

- Cover art by Boris Vallejo

Studio album by Ozzy Osbourne
- Released: 24 January 1986
- Recorded: 1985
- Studios: Townhouse, London, UK; AIR, London, UK; Studio Davout, Paris, France
- Genres: Heavy metal; glam metal
- Length: 40:51
- Labels: CBS Associated (US); Epic (UK)
- Producer: Ron Nevison

Ozzy Osbourne chronology
Bark at the Moon (1983)	The Ultimate Sin (1986)	Tribute (1987)

Singles from The Ultimate Sin
- 1. "Shot in the Dark" Released: 20 January 1986; 2. "The Ultimate Sin" / "Lightning Strikes" Released: 28 July 1986; 3. "Lightning Strikes" Released: 1986 (Aus)

Professional ratings
Review scores
Source	Rating
AllMusic	2/5 stars
Martin Popoff	6/10
Rolling Stone	(favorable)

The Ultimate Sin is the fourth studio album by the English heavy metal singer Ozzy Osbourne, released on 24 January 1986 in the United States and on 10 February 1986 in the United Kingdom. It is the second and last of Osbourne's albums to feature lead guitarist Jake E. Lee, the first to feature drummer Randy Castillo, and the only album to feature bassist Phil Soussan, who co-wrote the album's hit single "Shot in the Dark". It is also Osbourne's last album to feature his classic logo on the cover until 2010's Scream.

The album was awarded Platinum status in May 1986 and was awarded Double Platinum status in October 1994 by the RIAA.

== Overview ==
Upon returning from the Betty Ford Center in 1985 where he had undergone treatment for substance abuse, Osbourne was presented with a substantial quantity of music written by guitarist Jake E. Lee. After having been cheated out of his writing and publishing claims for Osbourne's previous album, 1983's Bark at the Moon, Lee says this time he refused to contribute anything until he had a contract in front of him guaranteeing his writing credit and publishing rights. Much of this music would form the basis of the album. The album's lyrics were largely written by long-time Osbourne bassist and lyricist Bob Daisley. The album was Osbourne's first to not feature bass playing from Daisley.

Daisley left the band prior to recording after having a disagreement with Osbourne, prompting the auditioning of Greg Chaisson. While he liked Chaisson’s playing, Osbourne decided his image did not fit the band; Chaisson would reunite with Lee a few years later in Badlands. Phil Soussan was ultimately hired just before recording commenced. At first, Daisley was not credited for his songwriting contributions on the initial 1986 pressing of the album, though Daisley did receive credit on subsequent pressings.

Future Y&T, Suicidal Tendencies and Megadeth drummer Jimmy DeGrasso worked with Lee and Daisley on demos for the album, but this version of the band fell apart due to Osbourne's commitment to the Black Sabbath summer 1985 reunion concert at Live Aid; Castillo and Soussan ultimately replaced DeGrasso and Daisley once recording commenced.

The working title for the album was Killer of Giants after the album's song of the same name. Osbourne opted to change the title to The Ultimate Sin at the last minute.

On 1 April 1986, a live performance promoting the album in Kansas City, Missouri, was filmed and released later that year as the home video The Ultimate Ozzy. In 1987, after the various tours in support of the album had concluded, guitarist Lee was unexpectedly fired by Osbourne's wife and manager Sharon. The specific justification for Lee's dismissal remains unknown. Bassist Soussan also departed, with Bob Daisley once again entering the fold.

== Reception ==
At the time of its release, when heavy metal was enjoying a surge in popularity, The Ultimate Sin was Osbourne's highest-charting studio album. The RIAA awarded the album Platinum status on 14 May 1986, soon after its release; it was awarded Double Platinum status on 26 October 1994. The album sold over 2,000,000 copies worldwide. In the UK, it was the final of four Osbourne albums to attain Silver certification (60,000 units shipped) by the British Phonographic Industry, achieving this in April 1986.

Despite its commercial success, Osbourne cites The Ultimate Sin as his least favorite solo album, saying "If there was ever an album I'd like to remix and do better, it would be The Ultimate Sin." Much of the vocalist's blame has been placed on the shoulders of producer Ron Nevison, saying "(He) didn't really do a great production job. The songs weren't bad, they were just put down weird. Everything felt and sounded the fucking same. There was no imagination."

== Track listing ==
All tracks are written by Ozzy Osbourne, Jake E. Lee, except "Shot in the Dark" written by Osbourne and Phil Soussan.

Side A
No.	Title	Length
1.	"The Ultimate Sin"	3:45
2.	"Secret Loser"	4:08
3.	"Never Know Why"	4:27
4.	"Thank God for the Bomb"	3:53
5.	"Never"	4:17

Side B
No.	Title	Length
6.	"Lightning Strikes"	5:16
7.	"Killer of Giants"	5:41
8.	"Fool Like You"	5:18
9.	"Shot in the Dark"	4:16
Total length:		40:51

Note

- "Shot in the Dark" runs 4:28 on the original vinyl and CD issues. The 1995 CD reissue uses the 4:16 single edit.
- "Shot in the Dark" was originally performed by Soussan's previous band Wildlife. Although the writing is credited solely to Soussan and Osbourne, some question whether other members of Wildlife (the Overland brothers, in particular) deserve writing credit for Osbourne's rendition.

== Personnel ==
Personnel taken from The Ultimate Sin liner notes.

- Ozzy Osbourne – vocals
- Jake E. Lee – guitars
- Phil Soussan – bass
- Randy Castillo – drums

Additional performers

- Mike Moran – keyboards

Production

- Produced and engineered by Ron Nevison
- Additional engineers – Martin White, Richard Moakes
- Remastered by Brian Lee with Bob Ludwig (1995 reissue)

== Charts ==
=== Weekly charts ===
Chart (1986)	Peak position
Australian Albums (Kent Music Report)	36
Canada Top Albums/CDs (RPM)	19
Dutch Albums (Album Top 100)	38
European Albums Chart	14
Finnish Albums (The Official Finnish Charts)	3
German Albums (Offizielle Top 100)	31
New Zealand Albums (RMNZ)	21
Norwegian Albums (VG-lista)	6
Swedish Albums (Sverigetopplistan)	4
UK Albums (Official Charts)	8
US Billboard 200	6

=== Year-end charts ===
Chart (1986)	Position
US Billboard 200	30

== Certifications ==
Region	Certification	Certified units/sales
Australia (ARIA)	Gold	35,000^{‡}
Canada (Music Canada)	Platinum	100,000^{^}
United Kingdom (BPI)	Silver	60,000^{^}
United States (RIAA)	2× Platinum	2,000,000^{^}
^{^} Shipments figures based on certification alone.^{‡} Sales+streaming figures based on certification alone.

== See also ==
- List of anti-war songs (Killer of Giants track on the list)
