= John Purdell =

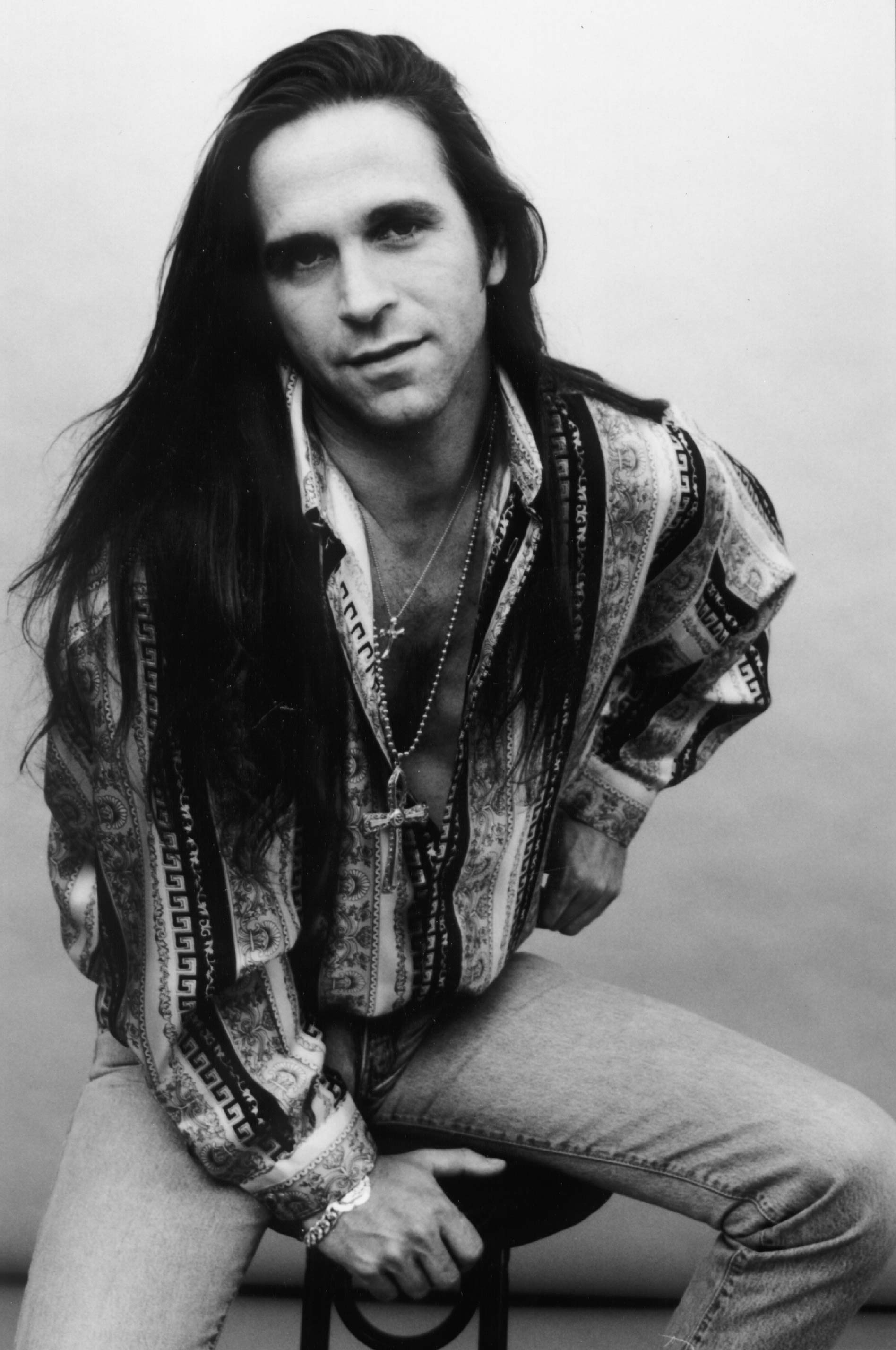
- John Purdell in 2001

Background information
- Born: John Finn Purdell; July 8, 1959; San Diego, California, U.S.
- Died: July 10, 2003 (aged 44) Quebec City, Quebec, Canada
- Genres: Rock; hard rock; heavy metal
- Occupations: Record producer; audio engineer
- Years active: 1986–2003

John Purdell (July 8, 1959 – July 10, 2003) was an American keyboardist, songwriter, music engineer, and multi-platinum rock music record producer who is credited on such albums as Ozzy Osbourne's No More Tears (1991) and Dream Theater's Awake (1994).

== Early life and education ==
He was born in San Diego and raised in Los Angeles. His father John Purdell (senior) (British) and mother Arrie Purdell (American) were both captains in the Salvation Army. He graduated from Verdugo Hills High School in Tujunga, California in 1977.

== Career ==
While in high school, Purdell became a staff writer for producer George Tobin.

Aside from being the producer of a number of acclaimed albums from such artists as Ozzy Osbourne, Abandon Shame, Poison, L.A. Guns, Dream Theater, Kix, Alice Cooper, Cinderella, Tangier, Heart, Ted Nugent and Demolition Pit, he toured over the years as keyboard player and singer for artists like Rick Springfield, Quiet Riot, the Lou Gramm Band, Cinderella and Foreigner. He also sang background vocals on the Mötley Crüe hit single "Girls, Girls, Girls" (1987). Purdell, who was splitting his time between the studio and the road at the time of his death, produced Ozzy Osbourne's best-selling album No More Tears (1991), where John co-wrote the title song, and he also penned the lyrics to three songs on Osbourne's album Ozzmosis (1995).

In 1997, Purdell founded the production company Three Wishes Inc with broadcasting executive Bill Flowers and Korean superstar Honey. The three worked with and produced some of rock's top bands. Purdell and Flowers also formed the independent record label Jackal Records in Los Angeles along with famed Capitol Records executive Frenchy Gautier, who was responsible for artists like David Bowie and Jimmy McKeever, a mastering engineer at Bernie Grundman Mastering Studio in Hollywood. McKeever mastered for Michael Jackson. The first release on the Jackal label was John Purdell's Hindsight. The first song released on Purdell's album was "Better Way to Die", which made it to the top of the adult contemporary charts.

== Death ==
While on tour with Foreigner lead singer Lou Gramm, Purdell was rushed to a hospital before a show in Quebec City, Canada. He had been diagnosed with prostate cancer a few months before and was flying home to Las Vegas for treatments twice weekly, but the cancer had already metastasized, spreading throughout his body. Purdell died two days after his 44th birthday. His wife Eun Joo Purdell, his father John Purdell, Sr, his business partner Bill Flowers and friend Chris Burroughs were by his side when he died in Quebec City. His ashes were spread over Niagara Falls, where he planned to vacation after the tour.

== Discography ==
- Hindsight (1998) – His first solo album, including the single "A Better Way to Die"

== Credits ==
(partial list)

- Quiet Riot, QR III (1986) – co-producer, keyboards
- Britny Fox, Bite Down Hard (1991) – Produced, Engineered & Mixed with Duane Baron
- Ozzy Osbourne, No More Tears (1991) – co-producer, co-wrote title track
- Tangier, Stranded (1991) – co-producer
- Foreigner, The Very Best ... and Beyond – co-producer, keyboards and background vocals
- Life, Sex & Death, Silent Majority (1992) – Produced, Engineered & Mixed with Duane Baron
- Heart, Desire Walks On (1993) – co-producer, keyboards and background vocals
- Alice Cooper, The Last Temptation (1994) – keyboards on three songs
- Cinderella, Still Climbing (1994) – co-producer
- Dream Theater, Awake (1994) – co-producer, backing vocals on "The Silent Man"
- Ozzy Osbourne, Ozzmosis (1995) – co-wrote "Perry Mason", "Old L.A. Tonight" and "Tomorrow"
