= Randy Castillo =

American drummer

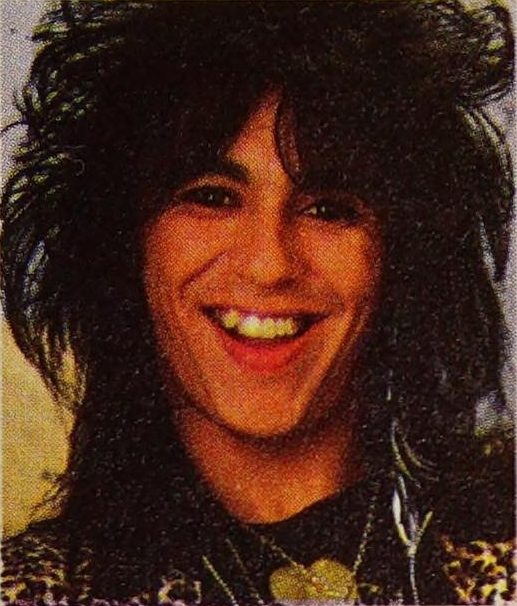
- Castillo in the 1980s

Background information
- Born: Randolpho Francisco Castillo; December 18, 1950; Albuquerque, New Mexico, U.S.
- Died: March 26, 2002 (aged 51) Los Angeles, California, U.S.
- Genres: Heavy metal; hard rock; glam metal
- Occupation: Drummer
- Years active: 1965–2002
- Labels: Epic; Mötley; Mercury; Star Licks Productions
- Formerly of: Lita Ford; Ozzy Osbourne; Red Square Black; Mötley Crüe; The Mud; Vince Neil Band; The Offenders; USSA; Bret Michaels
- Website: randycastillo.com

Randolpho Francisco Castillo (December 18, 1950 – March 26, 2002) was an American musician. He was Ozzy Osbourne's drummer during the mid-1980s to the early 1990s, and he was the drummer for Mötley Crüe, from 1999 to 2000.

== Early life ==
Castillo was born in Albuquerque, New Mexico. He was inspired to take up the drums after seeing The Beatles perform on The Ed Sullivan Show in 1964.

Randy's first rock band in Albuquerque was a hard rock cover band, "The Wumblies," which later moved to Denver, Colorado before breaking up in 1980.

Randy Castillo was a mixed-race Apache Native American, and had four sisters.

== Career ==
In 1984, Castillo was hired to play drums for Lita Ford and was featured on her Dancin' on the Edge album. Ford introduced Castillo to her boyfriend, Mötley Crüe bassist Nikki Sixx, and Nikki's bandmate Tommy Lee. Shortly after the Dancin' on the Edge tour, Lee called Castillo from a party he was at with Ozzy Osbourne and told him Ozzy was looking for a new drummer. Despite being unable to audition right away due to a broken leg he suffered while skiing, Castillo was hired by Osbourne a couple months later and ended up staying with the Ozzy Osbourne band for ten years, recording five albums with Ozzy during that time: The Ultimate Sin (1986), No Rest for the Wicked (1988), Just Say Ozzy (1990), No More Tears (1991), and a double-disc live album, Live & Loud (1993).

After recording Ozzy's live album in 1993, he joined the short-lived Bone Angels, followed by Red Square Black. Castillo also briefly returned to Osbourne's band in 1995 for a tour, and played drums on several tribute albums during this time. He played with Ronnie James Dio on a cover of Alice Cooper's "Welcome To My Nightmare" on the Alice Cooper tribute album Welcome To The Nightmare (An All Star Salute To Alice Cooper) and performed all drumming duties on a star-studded Def Leppard tribute album titled Leppardmania.

In 1999, after Lee had left Mötley Crüe, Sharon Osbourne called Castillo and suggested he join the band, which he did without audition. He had previously briefly played with Vince Neil as a touring drummer for the Vince Neil Band, and was an old friend of the band. His only recording with the band, 2000's New Tattoo, was somewhat of a return to the classic Mötley Crüe sound. However, fan reaction was mixed and the album was not as successful as the band hoped it would be. Still, there was excitement over the upcoming tour due to the revival in interest of many '80s hard rock acts, and the band geared up for their "Maximum Rock" tour with thrash metal legends Anthrax and Megadeth.

He also authored an instructional drum video for Star Licks in 1987.

== Death ==
Several weeks before Mötley Crüe was set to tour the New Tattoo album, joining Megadeth and Anthrax on the Maximum Rock Tour, Castillo became ill while performing with his mariachi side project Azul at the Cat Club in Hollywood. Immediately after the show Castillo took a cab to nearby Cedars-Sinai Medical Center where he collapsed as he was being admitted. The doctors discovered a duodenal ulcer that had perforated and performed emergency surgery that saved Castillo's life. With Castillo out of action, Hole drummer Samantha Maloney filled in for the tour. In October 2000, while taking time off from Mötley Crüe to recover from his surgery, he discovered a small lump on his jaw and a month later, after it had grown to roughly the size of a golf ball, he sought treatment and was diagnosed with squamous cell carcinoma, a common form of cancer that is usually not fatal if it is discovered early but can spread rapidly if left untreated. The cancer went into remission in mid-2001, and he was rumored to be rejoining Osbourne's solo band for that summer's Ozzfest tour (along with Geezer Butler on bass guitar), although these rumors were later revealed to be untrue.

Within a few months the cancer returned but this time in a more aggressive and lethal form, and a few days after returning to the doctors, Castillo died on March 26, 2002, aged 51.

== Discography ==
=== The Mud ===
- Mud on Mudd (1970 UNI Records)
- Mud (1971 UNI Records)

=== The Offenders ===
- The Offenders (1980)

=== Lita Ford ===
- Dancin' on the Edge (1984)

=== Ozzy Osbourne ===
- The Ultimate Sin (1986)
- No Rest for the Wicked (1988)
- Just Say Ozzy (1990)
- No More Tears (1991)
- Live & Loud (1993)

=== Red Square Black ===
- Square "EP" (1994)

=== Bret Michaels ===
- A Letter From Death Row (1998) (On Song "I'd Die For You")

=== Mötley Crüe ===
- New Tattoo (2000)

== Videography ==
- Star Licks sessions with Randy Castillo (1987)
