= Dusk (Badlands album) =

Studio album by Badlands
- Released: December 15, 1998
- Studio: Goodnight LA Studios, Los Angeles, California
- Genre: Hard rock, blues rock
- Length: 43:01
- Label: Pony Canyon
- Producer: Badlands

Badlands chronology
Voodoo Highway (1991)	Dusk (1998)

Professional ratings
Review scores
Source	Rating
AllMusic	2.5/5 stars
Collector's Guide to Heavy Metal	9/10
Rock Hard	8.0/10

Dusk is the third and final studio album by the band Badlands. The album was originally a collection of demos recorded in 1992–1993 to be submitted to their label, Atlantic Records. The demo tracks were released posthumously on December 15, 1998 in Japan on Pony Canyon. A European release on UK-based Z Records, with different artwork, followed in 2000.

The song "Lord Knows" was originally written and demoed for the first Badlands record, but ultimately left off the album. The song "The River" was re-recorded by Greg Chaisson for his 1994 solo album It's About Time with Rob Lamothe of the Riverdogs on lead vocals. Guitarist Jake E. Lee would re-use the main riff in "Sun Red Sun" for the song "Blood Provider" and the main riff in "Walking Attitude" for the song "The Key", demoed with his post-Badlands group, Wicked Alliance, which featured World War III vocalist Mandy Lion and future Korn drummer Ray Luzier.

After leaving Badlands and moving back to the East Coast, vocalist Ray Gillen joined New York-based all-star band Sun Red Sun, which he named after the Badlands song.

== Album notes ==
In an interview on the Racer X website, drummer Jeff Martin talked about the making of Dusk: "Dusk, or the tunes put on the album, were intended as demos for the next Badlands album after Voodoo Highway. We had worked up that group of tunes at rehearsals at Mates in North Hollywood two months before recording them at Goodnight L.A by a friend of Ray's, Shay Baby. It's all 24-track full studio recording, but we did it all in less than 6 to 8 hours. We put the mics up, made sure they worked and Go!"

"We recorded them primarily for Atlantic Records to hear and give us a budget for the full recording of the same tunes, if they liked what we had. They did not like the direction of the songs, for whatever the reason. Some months later we were dropped from Atlantic. At the time we were happy with that outcome and so was the management, being that Atlantic was not doing anything for us anyway. We shopped new prospects. Almost every song was one-take recordings. I remember having floor tom mic problems where we stopped to fix it, then re-started a song. But all in all, one takes. Even some endings were a little funky on my end, but Jake just flagged it off and we go to the next tune. I think Jake is the only one who did not make one mistake... if he did I did not hear it. Ray had about 50% of his lyrics together. The rest were what he called Jib-A-Jab. He would put a word or two on the front of a line and rest were all vowels. He was amazing at it, and most folks never could tell the difference. He would come up with his melody line by Jib-A-Jabbing. I think he had a harder time finding lyrics that fit his Jabbing, due to the timing and the percussive hooks he would come up with while scatting along. Nothing on Dusk was fixed, that Ray did, obviously due to his passing before the putting together of the tracks. For him to sound like what you hear on the album one take each tune, still amazes me to no end. He was one you could say had true talent, pitch and tone."

== Track listing ==
All tracks are written by Ray Gillen and Jake E. Lee, except where noted.

No.	Title	Writer(s)	Length
1.	"Healer"		4:45
2.	"Sun Red Sun"		5:29
3.	"Tribal Moon"		3:55
4.	"The River"	Greg Chaisson, Gillen, Lee	4:41
5.	"Walking Attitude"		2:55
6.	"The Fire Lasts Forever"		4:04
7.	"Dog"		3:27
8.	"Fat Cat"		4:33
9.	"Lord Knows"		4:55
10.	"Ride the Jack"		4:17

== Personnel ==
Badlands

- Ray Gillen – lead vocals
- Jake E. Lee – guitar, engineering repairs
- Greg Chaisson – bass, engineering repairs
- Jeff Martin – drums

Production

- Shay Baby – engineer
- Matt Thorne – engineering repairs at MT Studios, Burbank, California
- William Cooke – mastering at Abbey Mastering, Chatsworth, California
