= Greg Chaisson =

- Born: August 9, 1958 (age 68); Toronto, Ontario, Canada
- Genres: Hard rock, heavy metal, blues rock
- Occupation: Musician
- Instrument: Bass guitar

Greg Chaisson (born August 9, 1958) is a Canadian bass guitarist, singer, songwriter, and producer who has played in various bands, most notably Badlands, which featured former Ozzy Osbourne guitarist Jake E. Lee, vocalist Ray Gillen, and drummers Eric Singer and Jeff Martin, respectively.

== Biography ==
Chaisson got his start in a popular local Phoenix, Arizona band called Ghost Rose but his first recordings of note came with Surgical Steel and St. Michael, two early 1980s Phoenix bands that both featured his future Badlands bandmate, Jeff Martin. St. Michael would contribute the song "The Beauty, The Power" to the U.S. Metal Vol. IV compilation while Surgical Steel appeared on Metal Massacre II with "Rivet Head".

Chaisson then made the move to Los Angeles, CA where he joined one of the last incarnations of Steeler where he was replaced by his younger brother, Kenny, when the band morphed into Keel. Chaisson would join a succession of L.A. bands, including Legs Diamond, Hellion, and Terriff (with future Ozzy guitarist Joe Holmes). In 1986, he unsuccessfully auditioned for Ozzy Osbourne's band where he met Jake E. Lee who invited him to try out for Badlands a couple of years later.

After the demise of Badlands, he joined Sircle of Silence, featuring one-time Accept vocalist David Reece, but left before the first album was recorded. In the ensuing years, Chaisson kept busy recording with the Blindside Blues Band, Die Happy, Red Sea, Pat Travers, and Darrell Mansfield, among others. In 1994, he released a solo album, It's About Time, which featured former Badlands bandmate Eric Singer on drums, ex-St. Michael guitarist Jim McMellen, and Riverdogs alumni, Rob Lamothe and Marc Danzeisen. Chaisson briefly united with former Badlands bandmate Jake E. Lee when he joined his new band Red Dragon Cartel in 2014 but was forced to bow out less than a year later after being diagnosed with cancer.

Chaisson resides in Phoenix, AZ with his wife and children where he coaches and teaches baseball and manages Bizarre Guitar & Drum. Additionally, he plays in an original band named Kings of Dust which features vocalist Michael Beck who briefly fronted Red Dragon Cartel, guitarist Ryan McKay, and drummer Jimi Taft. In 2021, Beck was replaced by Ken Ronk on vocals and the band's name was changed to Atomic Kings.

== Discography ==
Greg Chaisson

- It's About Time (1994)

Badlands

- Badlands (1989)
- Voodoo Highway (1991)
- Dusk (1998)

Die Happy

- Volume 2 (1993)
- Intense Live Series Vol. 4 (1993)

Blindside Blues Band

- Blindside Blues Band (1993)
- Blindsided (1994)
- Messenger Of The Blues (1995)

Pat Travers

- Just A Touch (1993)

Red Sea

- Blood (1994)

Craig Erickson

- Two Sides Of The Blues (1994)

Darrell Mansfield

- Mansfield & Co. (1995)

Stephen Christian

- Stephen Christian (1998)

Steeler

- Metal Generation: The Steeler Anthology (2005)
- American Metal: The Steeler Anthology (2006)

Chris Catena's Rock City Tribe

- Truth in Unity (features in the song "The Trickster") (2020)

Kings of Dust

- Kings of Dust (2020)

=== Compilations ===
Surgical Steel

- Metal Massacre II (1982)

St. Michael

- U.S. Metal Vol. IV (1984)
