= McCoy (band) =

British heavy metal band

- Origin: London, United Kingdom
- Genres: Hard rock, heavy metal
- Years active: 1976–1977; 1983–1990; 1998
- Labels: Legacy; Mausoleum; Angel Air Records
- Past members: John McCoy; Paul Samson†; Roger Hunt; T-Bone Rees; Al B. Romano; Steve Linton; Mike Sciotto; Liam Genockey; Ron Rebel

McCoy was a British heavy metal band from the new wave of British heavy metal era. John McCoy also led his own band under the simple name McCoy during the 1980s, which has been integrated with members of bands like Iron Maiden, Samson and Gillan.

The band was formed by John McCoy before he went to play in Gillan. Paul Samson would later form Samson.

== Discography ==
- Oh Well (single), 1983
- McCoy, 1983
- Think Hard, 1984
- Think Hard... Again, 1998 – A compilation of Think Hard and McCoy with two additional tracks
- Brainstorm, 1998
- Live 1977, 2000
- Unreal - The Anthology (Compilation), 2007

== Band members ==
First Line-Up (1976)

- John McCoy – bass guitar
- Paul Samson† – lead guitar and vocals
- Roger Hunt – drums

1983 Line-Up

- T-Bone Rees – vocals
- John McCoy – bass guitar
- Steve Linton – guitar
- Paul Samson† – guitar
- Liam Genockey – drums
- Ron Rebel – drums

Think Hard Line-Up

- T-Bone Rees – vocals
- John McCoy – bass guitar
- Paul Samson† – guitar
- Ron Rebel – drums

Brainstorm Line-Up

- Al B. Romano – vocals and lead guitar
- John McCoy – bass guitar
- Michael Sciotto – drums

Other members

- Nikki Brooks - vocals
- Mark Keen† - guitar, backing vocals
- Arthur Guitar – guitar
- Bobby Rondinelli – drums

== See also ==
- List of new wave of British heavy metal bands
