= Mårten Andersson =

Swedish American Bassist

Marten Andersson
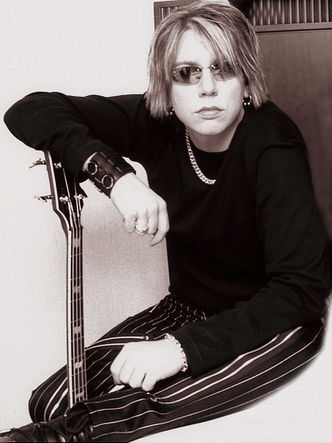
- Promotional photo

Background information
- Born: Mårten Andersson; 26 November 1974 (age 51); Stockholm, Sweden
- Genres: Hard rock, instrumental rock, metal
- Occupation: Musician
- Instrument: Bass
- Years active: 1992–present
- Website: marten.cc

Marten Andersson (born Mårten Andersson, 26 November 1974) is a Swedish American bass guitarist and a member of the hard rock and heavy metal groups Lita Ford, Steelheart, Lizzy Borden, George Lynch's Lynch Mob, Marten has also played with Dee Snider, John Rzeznik, Nancy Wilson, and Dario Lorina (Black Label Society).

== Career ==
Born as an only child, it was in the outskirts of Stockholm, that Marten developed an interest in becoming a musician after being exposed to bands such as Kiss and Iron Maiden. Marten had a passion for playing various different musical instruments but soon considered bass his main instrument. Marten once asked his father to buy him a guitar only to have the guitar traded in for a bass two weeks later. At the age of 16 he had already performed shows and recorded with various local bands but he had bigger aspirations. He wanted to take on Hollywood. By the age of 18 Marten moved to Los Angeles to study music and it did not take long before he started touring the world and recording with the heavy metal band Lizzy Borden. Named after the band's lead vocalist and known for their outrageous and theatrical stage shows.

Marten Andersson spent the next decade with Lizzy Borden, recording CDs and playing/touring together with bands such as: Deep Purple, Kings X, Dio, Yngwie Malmsteen, W.A.S.P. and Motörhead. Lizzy Borden released 9 albums and toured across the U.S. South America, Canada, Europe and Asia. Hitting the top 100 4 times in the U.S., #1 on CMJ (radio). Lizzy Borden previewed their CD 'Deal With the Devil' at the 'Wacken open air Festival Germany', in front of 35 thousand people followed by a worldwide tour. Longtime Lizzy Borden fan, artist and multimedia entrepreneur Todd McFarlane (best known for his creation of Spawn and stylistic revision of Spider-Man) was enlisted to capture the essence of Lizzy Borden for the Stage show and the CD cover art. Tragedy struck the band when guitarists Alex Nelson (2004) and Corey James (2009) were killed in separate car accidents, with Nelson's resulting in the band disbanding between 2004 and 2006.

In the late 1990s Andersson played with Jessica Simpson's and Jennifer Lopez guitarist Joy Basu, as well as recording two CDs entitled 'Second to None' (1996) and 'The Rocks' (2000) with "The Jonas Hansson Band", fronted by Swedish guitar player Jonas Hansson. Hansson was considered by many as one of the first guitar heroes to emerge from Scandinavia. The group featured members from Alice Cooper, Alcatrazz, Marty Friedman Band (Megadeth) and Silver Mountain.

In 2001, Marten Andersson released a solo project entitled, Legacy with various guest musicians, including Jonas Hansson co-producing and playing lead guitar. Andersson was handling bass and rhythm guitar duties. The CD was mixed and produced by Andersson and Hansson at Mastergroove Studio's in Granada Hills, California with the assistance of Mastergroove studio owner Dave Morse (Aerosmith, Guns N' Roses, Van Halen and Warrant). The CD received excellent reviews in the hardrock, Heavy Metal press but did not generate much noise in mainstreet media.

In 2003, Marten co-founded the Hollywood rock outfit Starwood with Lizzy (Borden), Joey Scott and Joe Steals. The band, (considered by some an updated, more modern version of Lizzy Borden) released their debut CD "If It Ain't Broke, Break It!" worldwide on Metalblade Records (2005). Their signature high energy rock in the vein of Velvet Revolver, Guns N' Roses and The Darkness made Starwood popular after just only one album and has gathered airplay in many places over the World with videos for the songs 'Subculture' and 'Bad Machine'. The band did a series of successful concerts in 2005 and are said to be working on a follow-up CD but this has never been confirmed.

In 2003, Marten was picked by former Dokken guitarist George Lynch to join his band Lynch Mob. This collaboration lasted for 7 years and 5 tours with the band, which included a marathon 26 shows in 30 days and a much talked about appearance on The Tonight Show with Jay Leno. The line-up was: George Lynch – Guitars, Andrew Freeman – Vocals, Vinny Appice (Black Sabbath/Dio) – Drums and Mårten Andersson – Bass

In 2006, Borden announced that they have reformed with new guitarist Ira Black and on 1 November 2007 "Appointment With Death" was released worldwide. The CD also features guest appearances by George Lynch (Dokken/Lynch mob), Jonas Hansson (Silver Mountain), Dave Meniketti (Y&T), Corey Beaulieu (Trivium) among others. The video for "Tomorrow Never Comes" was nominated for video of the year and was in the Top 25 Metal Videos of 2008 on MTV's Headbangers Ball. The follow-up video for "Under Your Skin" premiered in April the same year.

In early 2008, the band announced various festival appearances including Sweden Rock Festival (Sweden), Kobetasonik festival (Spain) and Bang Your Head Festival (Germany). In November 2008, Lizzy Borden toured the United States with Finnish Monster Rockers Lordi. Lizzy Borden was the first-day headliner of the two-day Keep It True XII festival at Tauberfrankenhalle in Lauda-Königshofen Germany. In 2010 the band performed at Rocklahoma and Rock Gone Wild festivals in North America and announced Japan tour dates and 2 extensive European tours, performing in 15 Countries including festival appearances throughout the world.

In 2011 Lizzy Borden Launched "Summer of Blood" tour in North American Followed by the European version, entitled "Death Takes a Holiday Tour", festival appearances in 2011 included Heaven and Hell Metal Fest, Christmas Metal Festival, Hard Rock Hell Festival.

In 2012, Lizzy Borden performed on various Open Air Festivals in Mexico and Europe. Festivals included Hellfest Open Air Festival in Clisson France and Gods of Metal in Milan Italy. Both festivals were with Ozzy, Mötley Crüe, Guns N' Roses and more. They returned to Europe in July 2012 to play Zwarte Cross festival in the Netherlands, Headbangers Open Air in Germany and for the first time in their career at the Bulgarian Festival, Kavarna Rock.

In 2013–2014, Lizzy Borden premiered their tour "30 years of American Metal" at the 70,000 tons of Metal Cruise, followed by North American, South American tour-dates, and European Festivals such as the Swedish Festival Skogsrojet and South Korean festival Pentaport. Lizzy Borden announced a month-long European winter tour starting in Madrid, Spain and ending in Moscow, Russia on 23 November 2014.

In 2013, Marten played bass on guitarist Dario Lorina's (Black Label Society) first solo recording, the CD is entitled "Dario Lorina", released on 10 September 2013 via Shrapnel Records.

In 2017 Marten appeared on Dario Lorina's second solo album entitled "Death Grip Tribulations" released on Mike Varney's "Shrapnel Records".

From 2016–2022 Marten recorded and touring worldwide (US/Europe/Asia) with the hardrock band Steelheart. Steelheart is fronted by singer Miljenko Matijevic. Steelheart has worked on several TV and several soundtracks for TV and movies. Including the hit song "We All Die Young" featured in the Mark Wahlberg and Jennifer Aniston movie "Rockstar". Steelheart is currently touring in support of the 2019 CD "Through Worlds of Stardust". Festival appearances includes UK Rockingham 2016, Busan Rock Festival South Korea 2017 (in-front of 50,000 people), Sweden Rock Festival 2018, Rockfest 80s festival 2017 and 2018, Monsters Of Cruise 2020, M3 Festival (2021).

In 2022, Marten joined former Runaways guitarist Lita Ford's band for Worldwide touring and recording. A statement from Lita Ford reads: "Marten brings to the stage a sound and high energy dynamic style of bass guitar playing like a freight train hauling thunder through a hurricane."

== Acting ==
According to imdb database, Andersson's acting credits includes smaller parts in movies and TV shows such as 'Sweet Justice' (Melissa Gilbert), 'Rock N' Roll Detective' (NBC Pilot), 'Midnight Heat', 'Divas' and 'To the end of Times'. Marten has been quoted as saying "It was just a phase I went through".

== Discography ==
- Solo Album
  - Legacy (2001)
- with The Jonas Hansson Band
  - Second to None (1996)
  - The Rocks (2000)
- with Starwood
  - If It Ain't Broke, Break It! (2003)
- with Dario Lorina's
  - Dario Lorina - self titled (2013)
  - Death Grip Tribulations (2017)
- with Lizzy Borden
  - Deal with the Devil (2000)
  - Appointment with Death (2007)
  - My Midnight Things (2018)

== Bass equipment and more ==
Marten has been a long time user and endorser of companies such as ESP Basses. Marten switches between 4-string electric basses and 8 string basses, mainly because of the fuller sound and his influence of bass players such as Tom Pedersson of Cheap Trick and Doug Pinnick of Kings X. "I have played ESP's for most of my life," explained Marten Andersson. "Working together with ESP, and based on my ideas and specs we have created a prototype of my first custom bass. This is a true, unique 8 string bass that has been refined in my head for a couple of years. I chose top components and the highest standards and craftsmanship that ESP offers. This bass stays in tune throughout a full headlining set and it is one of the loudest, most powerful basses I have ever heard."

This bass was supposedly designed on Marten's specifications but can be outfitted with either EMG or Seymour Duncan pickups, Schaller or Dunlop Straplocks, and Black or Chrome hardware. Featuring a standard 8 string ESP B Series neck (with a different headstock), 34" scale with 24 frets. The model incorporates a metallic red sparkle finish with star inlays as fret markers. Fretboard/inlay: rosewood/stars and Gotoh Tuners.

Marten holds bass clinics, music seminars, performs at music trade shows. Marten was the musical director for the Fender Namm Jam in Anaheim California 2006.

Marten's book "Make Label Contact" (SCI Publishing), a reference and musicians guide, aimed towards musicians for record companies and demo submissions was considered by some to be a great guide for new and upcoming musicians.

== Partial credits ==
- Author of the book 'Make Label Contact' (SCI Publishing)
- Jonas Hansson Band 1996–2000
- Legacy 1998–2002
- Starwood 2003–2006
- George Lynch (Lynch Mob) 2003–2011
- Lizzy Borden (1992–1996, 1999–2017)
- Dario Lorina Group 2013–2017
- From Classical to Rock 2016–Present
- Steelheart 2016–2022
- Lita Ford 2022-Present
