= Appointment with Death (disambiguation) =

Appointment with Death is a 1938 novel by Agatha Christie.

Appointment with Death may also refer to:

- Appointment with Death (play), a 1945 play by Christie adapting her novel
- Appointment with Death (film), a 1988 film adaptation of Christie's novel, directed by Michael Winner
- Appointment with Death (album), a 2007 album by Lizzy Borden
