= Voodoo Highway =

- Cover art by John Taylor Dismukes

Studio album by Badlands
- Released: June 7, 1991
- Studios: Rumbo (Los Angeles); Indigo Ranch (Malibu); Studio II (Culver City)
- Genres: Hard rock, blues rock
- Length: 45:15
- Label: Titanium/Atlantic
- Producers: Jake E. Lee, James A. Ball

Badlands chronology
Badlands (1989)	Voodoo Highway (1991)	Dusk (1998)

Professional ratings
Review scores
Source	Rating
AllMusic	2.5/5 stars
Collector's Guide to Heavy Metal	10/10

Voodoo Highway is the second studio album by the American hard rock band Badlands. After their first album, drummer Eric Singer was dropped from the band, later joining Kiss, and was replaced by drummer Jeff Martin, who had previously sung lead vocals in the bands Surgical Steel and Racer X. Bassist Greg Chaisson was instrumental in getting his friend Jeff Martin the gig with Badlands. They had earlier played in the Phoenix, AZ bands Surgical Steel and St. Michael together and teamed up again in the Blindside Blues Band and RedSea following the demise of Badlands.

The song "Joe's Blues" is named after then Terriff and future Ozzy Osbourne guitarist Joe Holmes who worked as a guitar tech for Jake E Lee during the recording of Voodoo Highway. Ray Gillen briefly joined Holmes in Terriff after leaving Badlands in 1992.

Commercially, the album sold only about a quarter of the amount of the group's debut album.

In 2005, American Idol star Bo Bice made the second to last round with his a cappella rendition of the album's closing track, "In a Dream". He lost the season to Carrie Underwood, but judge Simon Cowell believed that Bice would have won, had he saved "In a Dream" for his final performance.

== Track listing ==
All tracks are written by Jake E. Lee and Ray Gillen, except where noted.

No.	Title	Writer(s)	Length
1.	"The Last Time"		3:41
2.	"Show Me the Way"		4:12
3.	"Shine On"	Greg Chaisson, Lee, Gillen	4:22
4.	"Whiskey Dust"		4:18
5.	"Joe's Blues"	Lee	0:57
6.	"Soul Stealer"		2:58
7.	"3 Day Funk"		3:52
8.	"Silver Horses"	Jeff Martin, Lee, Gillen	4:40
9.	"Love Don't Mean a Thing"		4:01
10.	"Voodoo Highway"		2:22
11.	"Fire and Rain"	James Taylor	3:40
12.	"Heaven's Train"	Chaisson, Lee, Gillen	3:58
13.	"In a Dream"	Gillen	2:14

== Personnel ==
Badlands

- Ray Gillen – lead vocals, second harmonica on track 7
- Jake E. Lee – guitars, Moog bass, organ, piano, güiro, tambourine and percussion
- Greg Chaisson – electric and acoustic basses
- Jeff Martin – drums, assorted percussion, first harmonica on track 7, backing vocals

Production

- James A. Ball – co-producer, engineer, mixing at Westlake Audio, Los Angeles
- Brad Aldridge, Michael Malina – mixing engineers
- Gina Immel, Mike Gunderson, Steve Harrison – assistant engineers at Rumbo Recorders
- Chris Kupper – assistant engineer at Indigo Ranch and Studio II
- Greg Calbi – mastering at Sterling Sound, New York

== Charts ==
Chart (1991)	Peak position
UK Albums (Official Charts)	74
US Billboard 200	140
