= Jake E. Lee =

American guitarist (born 1957)

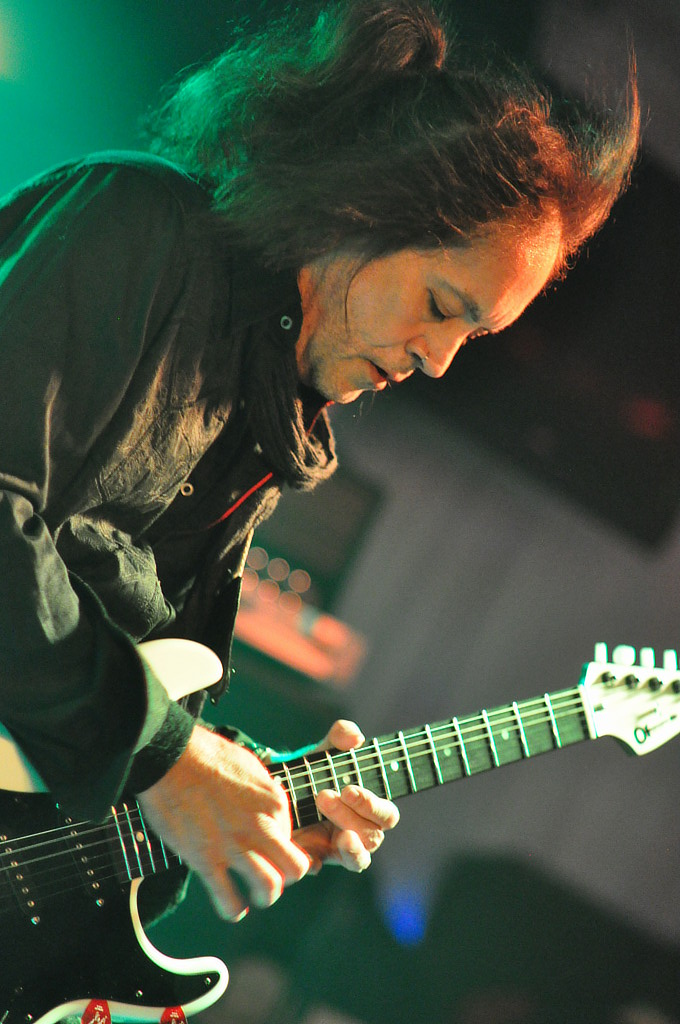
- Lee performing in 2014

Background information
- Born: Jakey Lou Williams; February 15, 1957 (age 69); Norfolk, Virginia, U.S.
- Genres: Heavy metal; glam metal; hard rock; blues rock
- Occupation: Musician
- Instrument: Guitar
- Years active: 1980–present
- Formerly of: Ratt; Ozzy Osbourne; Badlands

Jake E. Lee (born Jakey Lou Williams; February 15, 1957) is an American musician best known as lead guitarist for Ozzy Osbourne between 1982 and 1987 and later as a member of the heavy metal band Badlands with Ray Gillen. He formed the band Red Dragon Cartel in 2013, and their debut album released in January 2014 entered the Billboard Album Chart at number 69. He has also recorded solo works under his own name—examples being the instrumental album A Fine Pink Mist (1996) and cover album Retraced (2005).

== Career ==
=== Early career ===
In San Diego, Lee formed a band called Teaser, named after Tommy Bolin's debut solo album. Teaser would become the house band at a San Diego all-ages club called Straita Head Sound. In 1980, Lee joined a local heavy metal band called Mickey Ratt, who soon shortened their name to Ratt and relocated to the Sunset Strip of Los Angeles. They released the single "Dr. Rock"/"Drivin on E," which was given away for free to fans at their live shows. The song "Tell the World" was included on the original pressing of the first Metal Massacre compilation album in 1982, a highly influential album which also featured the first recording from Metallica.

Not long after arriving in Los Angeles, Lee left Ratt to join a glam metal band called Sexist, reuniting with childhood friend and fellow guitarist Doug Pittam. Approximately eight months later, Lee received an offer to join Rough Cutt after being recommended by drummer and former Ratt bandmate Dave Alford in late 1982.

Former Black Sabbath vocalist Ronnie James Dio was putting together a solo project with Jimmy Bain and Vinny Appice and was impressed with Lee after seeing a Rough Cutt show in Los Angeles, and invited the guitarist to join. Though Lee had believed Rough Cutt's future was promising, he felt the offer to join Dio was too good to pass up, though his time in the band would ultimately be short-lived. According to Appice, there were rehearsals with Lee, and recordings of those rehearsals still exist, but nothing more came from this first version of the band. Lee claims that Dio wanted him to play "simple block chords that wouldn't trample on his vocals" and cited creative differences for the split.

=== Ozzy Osbourne ===
When Ozzy Osbourne sought a replacement for guitarist Brad Gillis, Los Angeles bassist Dana Strum recommended Lee for the job. After auditioning, Osbourne was torn between Lee and Dokken guitarist George Lynch. Osbourne initially chose Lynch, but quickly changed his mind. Upon telling Lee he had the job, he then informed the guitarist that he had to tell Lynch he was fired.

With bassist Bob Daisley, Lee subsequently began composing music and recording the 1983 album Bark at the Moon. The songs "So Tired" and "Bark at the Moon" were released as singles, with accompanying videos, and they received regular airplay on MTV and radio. To date, the album has sold three million copies in the U.S. Though Lee had composed a significant amount of the album's music, he was allegedly cheated out of his writing and publishing claims by Osbourne's wife and manager, Sharon. Lee claims that after he had composed the songs and completed recording his parts in the studio, he was presented with a contract which stated that he would have no claim to any writing or publishing relating to the album. The contract also stated that Lee could not speak publicly about the matter. He claims he signed the contract because he had no legal representation and because Sharon threatened to fire him and have another guitarist re-record his parts if he refused.

Osbourne left the Betty Ford Center in 1985 where he had received treatment for substance abuse, and upon his return, Lee presented him with the music he had written. Osbourne was purportedly very satisfied with the quantity and quality of Lee's new music, much of which would be used for the 1986 album The Ultimate Sin. This time, however, Lee refused to contribute anything until he had a contract guaranteeing his writing credit and publishing rights. The album was awarded platinum status in May 1986 and was awarded double platinum status in October 1994. Lee and Osbourne once again toured extensively, this time with Phil Soussan on bass, John Sinclair on keyboards and Randy Castillo on drums. In Kansas City, Missouri on April 1, 1986, a concert was filmed which would be released later that year as the home video The Ultimate Ozzy.

In 1987, after touring with Ozzy Osbourne in support of the album The Ultimate Sin, Lee was fired suddenly via telephone by Sharon Osbourne. Lee was caught off guard by the firing, having been under the impression that he had a solid working relationship with Ozzy. Regarding Lee's firing, Osbourne has said that he had no personal issues with the guitarist whatsoever, but claimed that the dismissal happened after drummer Randy Castillo "began to turn against" Lee. Lee himself has said that bassist Phil Soussan was trying to convince Osbourne to let him be the band's primary songwriter while also discouraging him from using Lee's material, and that Soussan was "partly instrumental in getting me fired".

While appearing on That Metal Show on VH1 Classic, Jake E. Lee claimed he wrote "Bark at the Moon" for which Ozzy Osbourne claimed credit, along with the rest of that album. Lee and Daisley were properly credited for their writing on The Ultimate Sin album.

On July 5th, 2025, Lee performed at Osbourne's final concert, Back to the Beginning, alongside a supergroup consisting of Nuno Bettencourt, Mike Bordin, David Draiman, David Ellefson, Lzzy Hale and Adam Wakeman. Lee played two tracks from his career with Osbourne, "Shot In The Dark" and "The Ultimate Sin". Osbourne passed seventeen days after the concert, on July 22nd.

=== Badlands ===
After being fired from Ozzy's band, Lee formed the blues-based hard rock band Badlands with vocalist Ray Gillen in 1988. Badlands consisted of Lee, Gillen, drummer Eric Singer, and bassist Greg Chaisson. The band released their self-titled debut album in 1989. In 1991, Singer left Badlands to join Kiss following the death of longtime drummer Eric Carr. Badlands then released the follow-up album Voodoo Highway. During a tour between that album and the upcoming third album they were ready to begin recording, Gillen left the band and was briefly replaced by John West. Gillen later died of AIDS-related complications in 1993. In 1998, Dusk, the final Badlands album consisting of unreleased live in-studio 24-track demos was released in Japan; a European release followed in 2000.

Following the demise of Badlands, Lee opted for a radical musical departure and teamed with World War III vocalist Mandy Lion in a new band called Wicked Alliance. The initial line-up also featured future Korn drummer Ray Luzier and bassist Jimmy Bain who was replaced with Brian Perry, formerly of Dirty Looks and Lizzy Borden, in time for the band's one and only U.S. tour in early 1994. The band also cut a three-song demo with Joe Floyd of Warrior at Silver Cloud Studios in Burbank, CA. The songs recorded were "The Rust", "Kiss This", and "World Gone Wild", the latter of which Lion had previously performed with a late 1980s line-up of World War III. Another song the band worked on was "Blood Provider", based on Badlands' "Sun Red Sun", which later surfaced on the posthumous Dusk album in 1998. In 1996, Lee released an instrumental solo album titled A Fine Pink Mist on the Pony Canyon label in Japan with the intention of also releasing the Wicked Alliance album through the same company. However, Lee and Lion never finished the album and no tracks from it have surfaced to date.

Throughout most of the 1990s and into the new millennium, Lee kept a relatively low profile. He has most notably appeared on musical tributes to Queen, AC/DC, Rush, Van Halen, Randy Rhoads, and Metallica. Lee also briefly joined Bourgeois Pigs with Shark Island vocalist Richard Black, guitarist Michael Guy, and bassist Tony Franklin. One demo from the Bourgeois Pigs sessions emerged on the Union 4 compilation in 2001 called "Calamities of Vanity". In 2000, Lee played lead guitar on two tracks from Rob Rock's Rage of Creation album. In 2005, Lee released his first album in eight years entitled Retraced, which consisted of blues covers from the 1960s and 1970s. Lee was briefly in a three-piece band called 3 Day Crush.

In 2011, Jake appeared in the video, along with Ron Keel, Blas Elias, Sunset Thomas and Paul Shortino, for the song "We Come Undone" by the band Beggars & Thieves. The song is from their new CD We Are the Brokenhearted and Jake is featured performing the guitar solo. The following captions appear on the screen during Jake's appearance: "Jake E. Lee is alive and well, living in Las Vegas" and "He would just rather play with Beggars & Thieves than deal with shady promoters and play Bark at the Moon 750 more times".

In 2012, Lee had a cameo in That Metal Show's "That Metal Special" in Las Vegas, and was a guest on the fourth episode of the 12th season of the show as well as guest guitarist on the eighth and ninth episodes of the same season.

=== Red Dragon Cartel ===
In 2013, Lee formed a new band called Red Dragon Cartel. Their self-titled debut album was released in 2014. A second album, Patina, followed in 2018.

== Personal life ==
In 2024, ex-Badlands bassist Greg Chaisson said that Lee was suffering from carpal tunnel syndrome in his right wrist and was awaiting to have surgery, which explains why Lee had not played live since 2019. However, in a later interview, Lee stated the surgeon clarified he did not actually have carpal tunnel syndrome, and he was now receiving cortisone shots because he no longer had any cartilage remaining in his right hand.

On October 15, 2024, Lee was shot while walking his dog early in the morning in Las Vegas and survived. In detailed social media updates made in late October through November, Lee explained that he had confronted a group of masked burglars attempting to steal his neighbor's motorcycle. He had failed to deter them, and they opened fire on him and fled the scene. Lee was then rushed to Sunrise Hospital & Medical Center where he later made a full recovery.

== Discography ==
=== With Rough Cutt ===
- Songs "A Little Kindness" and "Used and Abused" (1981)

=== With Ozzy Osbourne ===
- Bark at the Moon (1983)
- The Ultimate Sin (1986)

=== With Badlands ===
- Badlands (1989)
- Voodoo Highway (1991)
- Dusk (1998)

=== With Wicked Alliance ===
- Twisted Beauty Demo (recorded 1994)

=== Solo ===
- A Fine Pink Mist (1996, Pony Canyon Records)
- Retraced (2005, Shrapnel Records)
- Runnin' with the Devil (2008, Cleopatra Records, a collection of tribute albums appearances)

=== With Mickey Ratt ===
- The Garage Tape Dayz 78-81 (2000)

=== With Enuff Z'Nuff ===
- Dissonance (2009)

=== With Red Dragon Cartel ===
- Red Dragon Cartel (2014)
- Patina (2018)
