= War dance (disambiguation) =

A war dance is a dance involving mock combat.

War dance may also refer to:

- War Dance, an album by the band Colosseum II
- Wardance (Rondinelli album)
- "War Dance", a 1978 disco song by Kebekelektrik
- "Wardance", a 1980 song by Killing Joke
- War Dance (Dad's Army), an episode of the British TV comedy series
- War/Dance, a 2007 documentary
- War Dancer, a Defiant Comics comic book series

== See also ==
- Dance War, an American television series on ABC
- Ghost Dance War, a 19th-century armed conflict between Native Americans and the U.S. government
- Ohafia War Dance, a mock dance performed by Ohafia people in Eastern Nigeria
- Weasel war dance, a colloquial term for a behavior of excited ferrets and weasels
