= Master of Disguise (Lizzy Borden album) =

Studio album by Lizzy Borden
- Released: July 15, 1989
- Recorded: January – May 1989
- Studios: Dodge City Sound, Los Angeles, CA
- Genres: Heavy metal, progressive metal
- Length: 57:22
- Label: Metal Blade/Enigma
- Producers: Alex Woltman; Elliot Solomon

Lizzy Borden chronology
Visual Lies (1987)	Master of Disguise (1989)	Deal with the Devil (2000)

Master of Disguise is the fourth studio album by Los Angeles heavy metal band Lizzy Borden.

The album was released in 1989 by Metal Blade Records and marked a different direction for the band. While still belonging to the glam metal genre, the album was a concept album also focused on theatrics, slower pieces, and dramatic themes. The album saw only founding members singer Lizzy Borden and drummer Joey Scott Harges return after the departure of long term guitarist Gene Allen.

Master of Disguise would prove to be the band's highest moment as it would spend 10 weeks on the US Billboard 200 chart and peaking at No. 133. Many songs from the album would become staples of the songs live sets, including the title track, "Love Is a Crime", and "Sins of the Flesh."

The album was re-released in 2007 with a 25th Anniversary Deluxe version with 2 bonus tracks and a DVD on the making of the album.

== Production ==
After long-time guitarist and songwriter Gene Allen quit the band, only founding members vocalist Lizzy Borden and drummer Joey Scott Harges remained. The album Visual Lies of 1987 had been a commercial success, but it was met with mixed critical response. In response to the troubled times, Borden would set out to write a concept album. In a 2018 interview, Borden mentioned that he wanted to focus on the vocals on the album, recording for the first time layered vocal harmonies with his voice, a style that he would use for every album afterwards. He said: "With me, it was just myself, so I really wanted to fight to try and find different personalities within each harmony, and flush that out. That was really my focus on that. I knew this was going to be a very vocal record — it was going to be all about the vocals, all about the song. It wasn't going to be about showcasing musicians or anything like that — it was all going to be about the song and the vocals." Additionally, the album's production marked a change in direction with a focus on a large stadium sound and the contribution of a full orchestra.

== Reception and legacy ==
Professional ratings
Review scores
Source	Rating
AllMusic	4/5 stars
Collector's Guide to Heavy Metal	7/10

Master of Disguise would become Lizzy Borden's highest-charting album, reaching No. 133 on the Billboard 200 Chart in 1989.

In a review for AllMusic, Eduardo Rivadavia compared it to Alice Cooper's transition from being the Alice Cooper Band to a solo act. "Much like Alice's triumphant solo debutant ball, Welcome to My Nightmare, Lizzy Borden's next dance, Master of Disguise, was a highly stylized concept album built on surprisingly solid compositional ground, and did much to eradicate thoughts of recent blunders." Canadian journalist Martin Popoff remarked how the band was able to mix "epic structures quite curiosly with hair metal", a reminder of golden era Alice Cooper and of "ambitious W.A.S.P.". Metal album review blog Angry Metal Guy wrote, "A highly entertaining piece of metal, Master of Disguise is far and away Lizzy Borden‘s best work with their most mature writing. It also shows a band willing to take chances, roll the dice and be more than a metal band with their hair metal roots showing. Check this out, but be prepared to sing along and rock out in front of a mirror." In a review for Exclaim!, reviewer Keith Carman wrote "It straddles a hair metal past and a slightly more direct metallic future, and by album's end the soaring vocal delivery, multiple time signatures, samples, soft acoustics and driving rock'n'roll beats prove that despite casting himself in with a usual gang of heavy metal idiots, at least at one point in time (however short it was), Lizzy Borden realised their own heavy metal The Wall. Maybe we can grow to appreciate this re-energised version."

== Track listing ==
All tracks are written by Lizzy Borden, except where noted.

No.	Title	Length
1.	"Master of Disguise"	7:22
2.	"One False Move"	2:52
3.	"Love Is a Crime"	5:27
4.	"Sins of the Flesh"	4:36
5.	"Phantoms"	6:23
6.	"Never Too Young"	4:53
7.	"Be One of Us"	4:06
8.	"Psychodrama" (Borden, Joey Scott Harges)	4:43
9.	"Waiting in the Wings" (Borden, Mike Davis, Scott Harges)	5:35
10.	"Roll Over and Play Dead"	4:08
11.	"Under the Rose"	2:45
12.	"We Got the Power"	4:32
Total length:		57:22

2007 Remastered Edition bonus tracks
No.	Title	Length
13.	"Vampires Kiss" (previously unreleased)	2:29
14.	"The Orchestra" (previously unreleased)	1:56
Total length:		61:07

== Band members ==
Lizzy Borden

- Lizzy Borden - vocals
- Joey Scott Harges - drums

Additional musicians

- Ronnie Jude - guitars
- David Michael Philips - guitars, acoustic guitar
- Mike Razzatti - additional guitars
- Mike Davis, Brian Perry, Joey Vera - bass
- Elliott Solomon - keyboards, horn arrangements, producer
- William Kidd - additional keyboards, orchestral arrangements, conductor
- Tim Stithem - additional percussion
- Brian Coyle, Jacques Voymant, Jerry Moore, John Chudoba, TJ Santos, Tim Taylor - horns on "Love Is a Crime" and "We Got the Power"
- Black White And Brown Orchestra - backing vocals on "We Got the Power"

Production

- Alex Woltman - producer, engineer
- Craig Nepp, Mike Duncan, Stoli - assistant engineers
- Terry Brown - mixing
- Gary Gray - mixing engineer
- Darren Solomon - horn arrangements
- Brian Slagel - executive producer

== Chart ==
Chart (1989)	Peak position
US Billboard 200	133
