= A Fine Pink Mist =

Studio album by Jake E. Lee
- Released: 21 August 1996
- Recorded: Juan Croucier 's Cellar Studios 1995
- Genre: Heavy metal, instrumental rock, blues rock
- Length: 41:37
- Label: Pony Canyon, Shrapnel Records, Mascot Records
- Producer: Jake E. Lee

Jake E. Lee chronology
A Fine Pink Mist (1996)	Retraced (2005)

A Fine Pink Mist is the debut solo album of former Ozzy Osbourne and Badlands guitarist Jake E. Lee, released in 1996. It is an instrumental album. The album received favorable reviews and was compared by music critics to Joe Satriani's Surfing with the Alien. The initial version of the album was recorded at Juan Croucier's The Cellar studio in 1995, over a six-month period. However, Lee re-recorded the whole album from scratch after getting into a disagreement with Croucier.

The only track released to the public from the Croucier sessions was a cover of "Rice Pudding", with Ray Luzier on drums, which appeared on the 1996 Jeffology: Jeff Beck Tribute on Shrapnel Records.

In 2009, Croucier listed the original recording tapes on eBay with a starting price of $15,000. The listing contained a total of four (4) 2 inch 24 track Ampex 499 master tapes and also 2 Stereo DAT tapes, which contain rough mixes of the content on the audio masters. Also included in the listing was all the track sheets with details of each audio track on the 24 track masters as well as tempos, etc. The final recording session wasn't totally finished and the studio was never paid for the studio time incurred.

The song "Bludfuk" was given that name in mutual agreement between Jake and Mike Varney. It sounded very similar to "fuck" and seemed very offensive to Varney. Other songs like "Atomic Holyday" come from his time in Wicked Alliance in 1994 with Mandy Lion, Ray Luzier and Brian Perry.

== Track listing ==
No.	Title	Writer(s)	Length
1.	"Exithouse"	Jake E. Lee	3:23
2.	"Demon A-Go-Go"	Jake E. Lee	5:34
3.	"Soulfinger"	Jake E. Lee	3:41
4.	"The Rapture"	Jake E. Lee, Linda Walling	5:19
5.	"I Magnify"	Jake E. Lee	4:06
6.	"The Velvet Fire"	Jake E. Lee	4:31
7.	"Atomic Holiday"	Jake E. Lee, Mark Farrell	7:07
8.	"Galaxy of Tears"	Jake E. Lee	3:04
9.	"Luna Ginata"	Jake E. Lee	0:46
10.	"Bludfuk"	Jake E. Lee	4:01

== Personnel ==
- Jake E. Lee – guitars, bass, drum machine, engineering, production, mixing
