= Al B. Romano =

Al Romano
- Born: April 23, 1965 (age 59); Yonkers, New York, U.S.
- Genres: Hard rock, heavy metal, thrash metal, nu metal
- Occupation(s): Guitarist, Songwriter & Producer
- Instrument(s): Guitar, Vocals

Al B. Romano (born April 23, 1965) is a musician. At age 14, he was taught guitar by Leslie West of Mountain.

== Musical career ==
Romano co-wrote 2 songs on Mountain's 1986 Go For Your Life album. In 1990, he teamed up with former Ian Gillan & Mammoth bassist John McCoy. They recorded an album called Heavy Metal Cowboys (later entitled McCoy Brainstorm), which was released on Angel air records in the U.K.

In 1992, Romano joined the band Belladonna with former Anthrax vocalist Joey Belladonna. After writing 8 songs, Romano left the group. He then formed Sun Red Sun, a supergroup that featured an all star cast of hired musicians: Ray Gillen on vocals, former Alice In Chains bassist Mike Starr, Bobby Rondinelli on drums, and Al Romano on guitar. Their initial album, Sun Red Sun, also featured guest appearances from Chris Caffery of Savatage, John West, John McCoy and Mike Sciotto. Shortly after completion of the recording, Vocalist Ray Gillen died from complications of AIDS on December 1, 1993 and the group split up. The album Sun Red Sun was released two years later. It received two and a half stars from AllMusic.

In 1996, Romano formed the Dali Gaggers with former Marilyn Manson bassist Gidget Gein. they recorded one album called Dali Gaggers Just Ad Nauseam (later entitled Gidget Gein Confessions of a Spooky Kid). The band split up in 2000.

In 2009, Romano re-joined Joey Belladonna's solo group and did several shows with Belladonna in the U.S.A In Feb 2014, Romano teamed up with Cro-Mags founding bassist Harley Flanagan to work on Harley's solo album on Southern Lord records. Flanagan released the 1st single 'Trust No One" with Romano on lead guitar. Romano is also featured on 7 songs on the Harley Flanagan 2016 Cro-Mags solo album which was released in 2016 on Southern lord records.

== Promoter ==
Romano is a vintage guitar collector. Among his collection are guitars of Jimi Hendrix, Ace Frehley's 1959 Les Paul, Eddie Van Halen, Leslie West, Eric Clapton, and others.
