= Wardance (Rondinelli album) =

Studio album by Rondinelli
- Released: 1996
- Recorded: 1985
- Genre: Rock

Rondinelli chronology
| Wardance (1996) | Our Cross, Our Sins (2002) |

Wardance is an album by the band Rondinelli. It was recorded in 1985, but wasn't released until 1996.

Singer Ray Gillen and drummer Bobby Rondinelli later played together in the band Sun Red Sun.

Soon after the recording of this album, Ray Gillen joined Black Sabbath and James LoMenzo joined White Lion.

Track 6 "Fly Paper" features Teddy Rondinelli on vocals rather than Gillen.

== Track listing ==
1. "Wardance"
2. "Black Sheep"
3. "Rock & Roll"
4. "The One That Got Away"
5. "Kiss & Say Goodbye" (Live)
6. "Fly Paper" (Live)
7. "We Can't Lose" (Live)
8. "Wardance" (Live)

== Personnel ==
- Ray Gillen: Lead vocals
- Teddy Rondinelli: Guitar, Co-lead vocal on Track 3 & lead vocal on Track 6
- James LoMenzo: Bass
- Bobby Rondinelli: Drums
- Corey Davidson: Keyboards
