= Menace to Society (Lizzy Borden album) =

Studio album by Lizzy Borden
- Released: September 1, 1986
- Studio: Music Grinder, Hollywood and Preferred Sound, Woodland Hills, California
- Genre: Heavy metal
- Length: 41:50
- Label: Enigma/Metal Blade
- Producer: Jim Faraci, Lizzy Borden, Brian Slagel

Lizzy Borden chronology
The Murderess Metal Road Show (1986)	Menace to Society (1986)	Terror Rising (1987)

Professional ratings
Review scores
Source	Rating
AllMusic	4.5/5 stars
Collector's Guide to Heavy Metal	6/10
Kerrang!	4/5 stars

Menace to Society is the second studio album by Los Angeles metal band Lizzy Borden.

Released in 1986 by Metal Blade Records, this would become a success for the band appearing on the Billboard 200 for 10 weeks and peaking at 144. The album was re-released in 2002 with 4 bonus tracks, and again on vinyl in 2018.

== Track listing ==
All tracks are written by Gene Allen, Lizzy Borden, Mike Davis, Joey Scott Harges, Alex Nelson, except where noted.

Side one
No.	Title	Length
1.	"Generation Aliens"	4:30
2.	"Notorious"	4:15
3.	"Terror on the Town"	5:21
4.	"Bloody Mary"	4:40
5.	"Stiletto (Voice of Command)"	3:33

Side two
No.	Title	Length
6.	"Ultra Violence"	4:08
7.	"Love Kills"	5:24
8.	"Brass Tactics"	3:26
9.	"Ursa Minor"	4:00
10.	"Menace to Society"	4:05

2002 Edition bonus tracks
No.	Title	Writer(s)	Length
11.	"Taking on the World" (Demo)		3:54
12.	"White Rabbit" (Live demo, Jefferson Airplane cover)	Grace Slick	3:43
13.	"Stiletto (Voice of Command)" (Live demo)		3:36
14.	"Betrayer" (Live demo)		2:16

== Personnel ==
Lizzy Borden

- Lizzy Borden - vocals
- Gene Allen - guitars
- Alex Nelson - guitars, backing vocals
- Mike Davis - bass
- Joey Scott Harges - drums

Production

- Jim Faraci - producer, engineer
- Brian Slagel - executive producer

== Charts ==
Chart (1986)	Peak position
US Billboard 200	144
