= Visual Lies =

Studio album by Lizzy Borden
- Released: September 16, 1987
- Studio: Long View Farm, North Brookfield, MA
- Genre: Heavy metal
- Length: 41:50
- Label: Enigma/Metal Blade
- Producer: Max Norman

Lizzy Borden chronology
Terror Rising (1987)	Visual Lies (1987)	Master of Disguise (1989)

Professional ratings
Review scores
Source	Rating
AllMusic	3/5 stars
Collector's Guide to Heavy Metal	7/10

Visual Lies is the third album by the American heavy metal band Lizzy Borden and the only one to feature future David Lee Roth and Ozzy Osbourne guitarist Joe Holmes, credited as J. Holmes.

It features their best known song "Me Against the World" for which the band shot a promotional video. The track was also featured in the 1987 heavy-metal horror film, Black Roses. The movie remains a cult-classic among 80's metal fans.

== Track listing ==
All songs by Lizzy Borden and Gene Allen, except where noted

Side one

1. "Me Against the World" - 5:03
2. "Shock" (Borden, Allen, Joe Holmes) - 4:35
3. "Outcast" - 4:21
4. "Den of Thieves" (Borden, Allen, Holmes) - 3:48
5. "Visual Lies" - 4:05

Side two

1. "Eyes of a Stranger" - 4:27
2. "Lord of the Flies" - 5:41
3. "Voyeur (I'm Watching You)" - 4:32
4. "Visions" (Borden, Allen, Holmes, Joey Scott) - 5:24

Remasterd CD edition bonus tracks

10. "Me Against the World" (Demo) - 4:53
11. "Lord of the Flies" (Demo) - 5:13
12. "Visual Lies" (Demo) - 4:08
13. "Me Against the World" (Bat2TheSkull Remix - Demo) - 2:23

== Band members ==
Lizzy Borden

- Lizzy Borden - vocals
- Gene Allen - guitars
- Joe Holmes - guitars
- Mychal Davis - bass
- Joey Scott - drums

Production

- Max Norman - producer, engineer, mixing
- Bob Ludwig - mastering at Masterdisk, New York

== Chart ==
Chart (1987)	Peak position
US Billboard 200	146
