= Marc Danzeisen =

American drummer and musician

Marc Stewart Danzeisen (born in Riverside, CA, January 17, 1961) is an American drummer and musician. He is best known for his work with Riverdogs, Gilby Clarke, Little Caesar, his contributions to Def Leppard, and his appearance in the 1995 film, The Brady Bunch Movie.

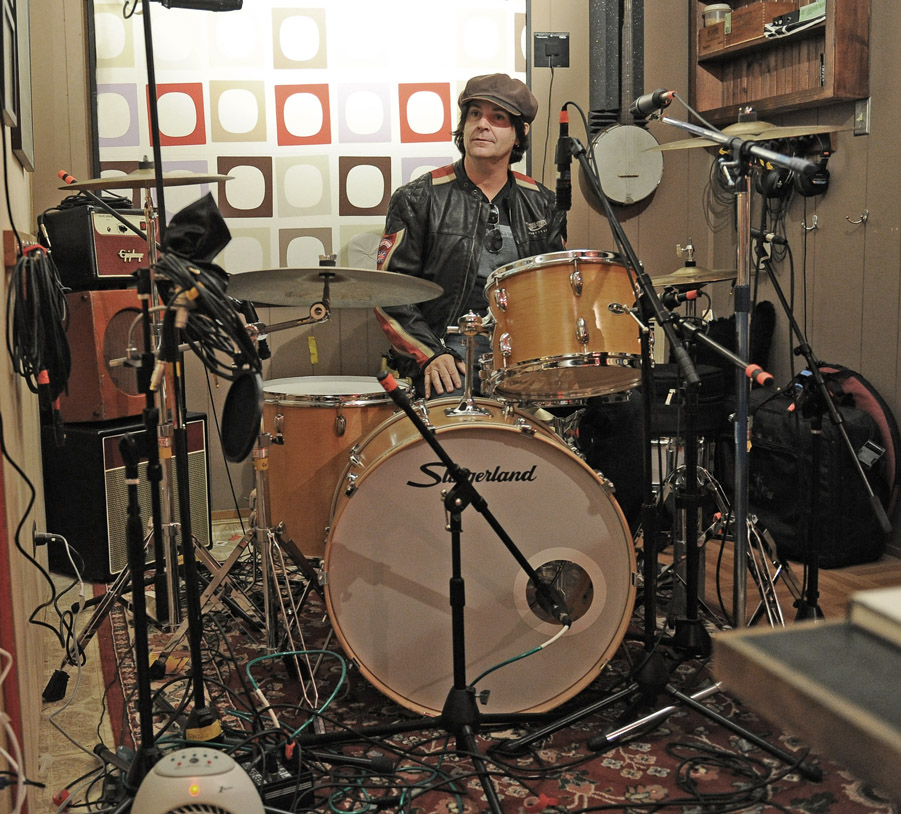
Marc Danzeisen at his drum kit

== Biography ==
In 1990, Danzeisen joined the Epic-associated band Riverdogs. The band featured guitarist Vivian Campbell of Dio and Whitesnake fame. While the album did receive critical acclaim, the band never got the push due to internal issues and 'restructuring' at the label. Vivian Campbell left the band to join Def Leppard. Danzeisen left the band to fill in on drums for Geffen Records act, local blues-rock band Little Caesar. The band toured for three weeks in Europe; upon their return to the US, they disbanded.

With session work, Danzeisen stayed busy until 1993. Then his friend of twenty years, Gilby Clarke (Candy, Kills For Thrills, Guns N' Roses), asked him to join his solo project. After recording months of demos and playing shows in L.A., Gilby landed a solo deal with Virgin Records. In 1994, Danzeisen (drums, backing vocals, harmony vocal and percussion), Gilby (guitar, lead vocals), Will Effertz (bass, backing vocal), Joe 'Dog' Almeida (guitar, slide guitar), and several guest artists went into A&M recording studio A, with producer Waddy Wachtel (guitarist for James Taylor, Keith Richards, Linda Ronstadt, and producer for The Church). The result was Pawnshop Guitars, Gilby's first solo album. After the release, Gilby and band, now featuring guitarist Ryan Roxie (Alice Cooper) in place of Joe 'Dog' Almeida, went on tour for a year, as headliners in the US and opening for Aerosmith in South America.

His personal and professional partnership with Vivian Campbell (Def Leppard) has been productive as well. Vivian had Danzeisen play drums and sing harmony/backing vocals on the Tom Petty song "American Girl" from the Def Leppard cover songs CD "Yeah" released through the Walmart chain from 2006. Danzeisen also sang backgrounds on the Def Leppard album Songs From The Sparkle Lounge in 2008.

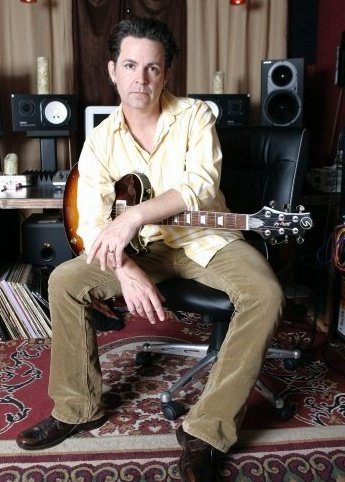
Marc Danzeisen with guitar

== Film and television work ==
In 1995, writer, producer, and guitarist Dave Darling (producer of Brian Setzer, mixer of John Waite's Rough & Tumble album and many other artists) asked Danzeisen to sing backgrounds, and later to assemble a band for The Brady Bunch Movie soundtrack. Danzeisen was the drummer, Roger Joseph Manning, Jr. (Jellyfish) played keyboards, Sheldon Strickland bass, Eric Dover (Jellyfish) guitar, and Dave Darling was vocalist. "Mudd Pagoda" was the fictitious band's name on the soundtrack album. The band appeared in the film, as the backing band for Davy Jones, who performed an updated version of his hit, "Girl".

In 2000, Danzeisen was asked to join the studio band for the short-lived Comedy Central game show Don't Forget Your Toothbrush. The host was comedian Mark Curry. The band consisted of two horn players, a percussionist, bassist, guitarist, keyboardist, and Danzeisen on drums. The band was well-rounded in every genre of music. The show lasted 23 episodes before being cancelled.

Danzeisen has also composed for films, including the title track for the indie film Letter From Home (2000), and the song "See Yourself" for He's Such a Girl (2009).

== Discography and credits ==
=== Major label releases ===
- 1985 Francis X and the Bushmen, Soul Incest - drums
- 1985 Touch, Rocky IV soundtrack, MGM/Scotty Brothers Records - drums
- 1994 Gilby Clarke, Pawnshop Guitars, Virgin Records - drums, backing vocals, percussion
- 1994 Greg Chaisson, It's About Time, Graceland Records - percussion, backing vocals
- 1995 Gilby Clarke, Blooze EP, Virgin Japan - drums, backing vocals
- 1997 Die Happy, Frontline Records - percussion
- 2001 Michelle Bradford Jones Warner Brothers Australia - drums
- 2006 Def Leppard, Yeah bonus CD, Island / Universal Music Group - drums, harmony vocals
- 2007 Suzie McNeil, Broken and Beautiful, Universal Canada - drums
- 2011 Riverdogs, World Gone Mad, Melodic Rock Records - drums, backing vocals

=== Independent/iTunes releases ===
- 1996 Powerslide, Peel, PSM Records - drums, vocals, guitars, bass
- 1999 Bijou Phillips, Almo Music - drums, drum loops
- 2000 Derek Spent, Walking Dichotomy - drums
- 2001 Little Friend, Living Room Records - drums, guitar, bass
- 2006 Brewer & Chase - drums, bass, electric guitar
- 2006 Kellie Rucker, Ain't Hit Bottom- drums
- 2006 Four Star Mary, Hello It's Me, MSG Records - drums
- 2006 Roxie77, peace, love, and Armageddon - harmony, backing vocals
- 2012 Big Mick and the Curl, Not Of This Surf - drums

=== Solo/independent albums ===
- 1996 Powerslide, Peel, PSM Records - guitar, bass, drums, vocals, production
- 2008 Marc Danzeisen Absorbent, PSM Records - all instruments, production
- 2010 Marc Danzeisen Released, PSM Records - all instruments, production

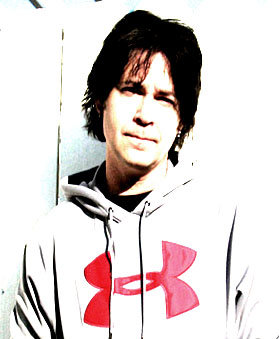
Marc Danzeisen 3

=== Production/mixing ===
- 1996 Powerslide, Peel, PSM Records
- 1997 Revolux
- 1999 My Sister Amazing
- 2000 Moaning Lisa, Wonderful, Veronica Records
- 2000 Mass Confusion
- 2003 Appleseed, Forever And A Day
- 2006 Brewer & Chase
- 2008 Desecrate
- 2011 Riverdogs, World Gone Mad (one of four producers)

=== TV/film/commercials ===
- 1994 The Brady Bunch Movie, Paramount Pictures - drums in Davy Jones' band
- 1994-96 Mad About You, Paramount Television - drums on soundtrack
- 1994 Towner Mini Vans Korean commercial - composer/producer
- 1995 Clueless, Paramount Pictures - drums on soundtrack
- 1995 Countdown Clothing Korean commercial - composer/producer
- 1999 CBS Television Los Angeles - movie of the week composer
- 2000 Don't Forget Your Toothbrush, Comedy Central/ Buena Vista 23 episodes - drums in show band
- 2005-06 ADS Post Los Angeles - movie trailer composer
- 2007 Elektrofilms Post Burbank - movie trailer composer

=== Music videos ===
- Riverdogs, "Toy Soldier" - Epic Associated - Sony Music
- Little Caesar, "Stand Up" - Geffen Records
- Gilby Clarke, "Cure Me or Kill Me", "Tijuana Jail", "Johanna's Chopper" - Virgin Records

=== Tours/appearances ===
- 1982 The Flames, Southern California – several shows
- 1983-84 Ashes, Southern California – one year
- 1985 Francis X and the Bushmen, EMI/FM Revolver Records Tour – one year
- 1987 Bulletboys, Southern California shows – six months
- 1990 Riverdogs, Epic Associated/Sony Records Tour – eight months
- 1992 Little Caesar, Geffen Records "Influence" tour – six months
- 1995 Gilby Clarke, Pawnshop Guitars, Virgin Records world tour – one year
- 1996-96 House Of Blues Band Foundation's band for education of the blues
- 1998-2001 Rondor Music Publishing House, drummer for artist sessions
- 2000 Agent Orange, Southern California – several shows
- 2004 Riverdogs, Southern California - four reunion shows

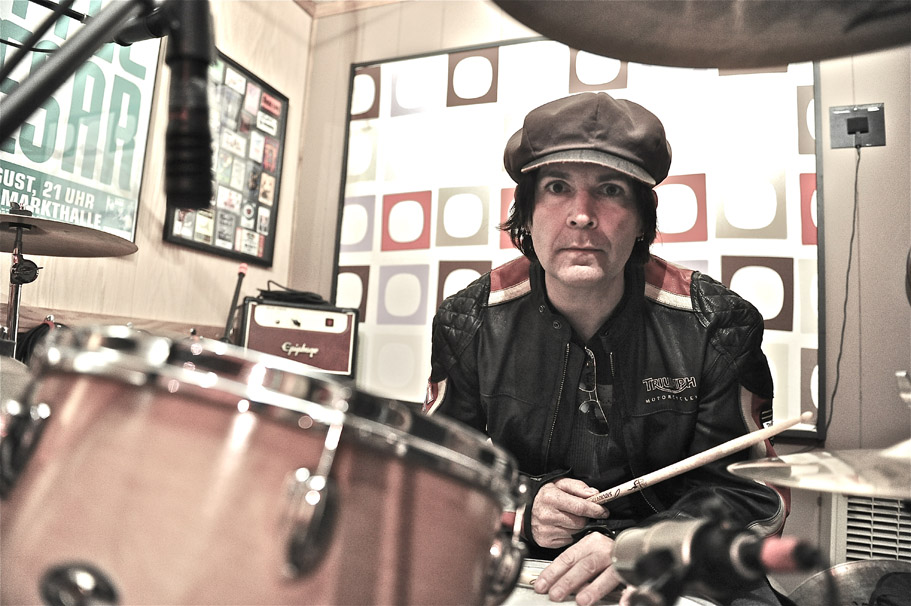
Marc Danzeisen closeup at drum kit

== Drums/endorsements ==
Several drum sets and snare drums from 1940s Slingerland"Radio Kings." One is a 1938 Ludwig & Ludwig snare drum that belonged to drumming legend Gene Krupa. He also owns Mapex, Gretsch, Ludwig & Ludwig, Leedy, Ludwig, Fibes, Corder, Darwin, and DDC (Danzeisen Drum Co) of various years.

- 1987 – present, endorsed by Zildjian cymbals and drumsticks

=== Live drum set ===
Danzeisen Drum Company

- 14x26 bass
- 8x12 Rack Tom or 9x13
- 15x16 Floor Tom
- 16x18 Floor Tom (when needed)
- 5x14 Snare or 6x14 Snare
- 14” A-Custom Hi-Hats
- 17” A-Custom Fast Crash
- 18” A-Custom Fast Crash
- 21” A-Custom Ride or 22” K-Light Ride
- 8” Avedis Zildjian -Splash

=== Studio drum sets ===
Fibes-Corder

- 16x24 Bass Drum
- 9x13 Rack Tom
- 16x16 Floor Tom
- 5x14 Snare Drum

Mapex 1995 Orion Series

- 16x22 Bass Drum
- 8x10 Rack tom
- 9x12 Rack Tom
- 14x16 Floor Tom
- 16x16 Floor Tom
- 4-1/2x13 Steel Snare

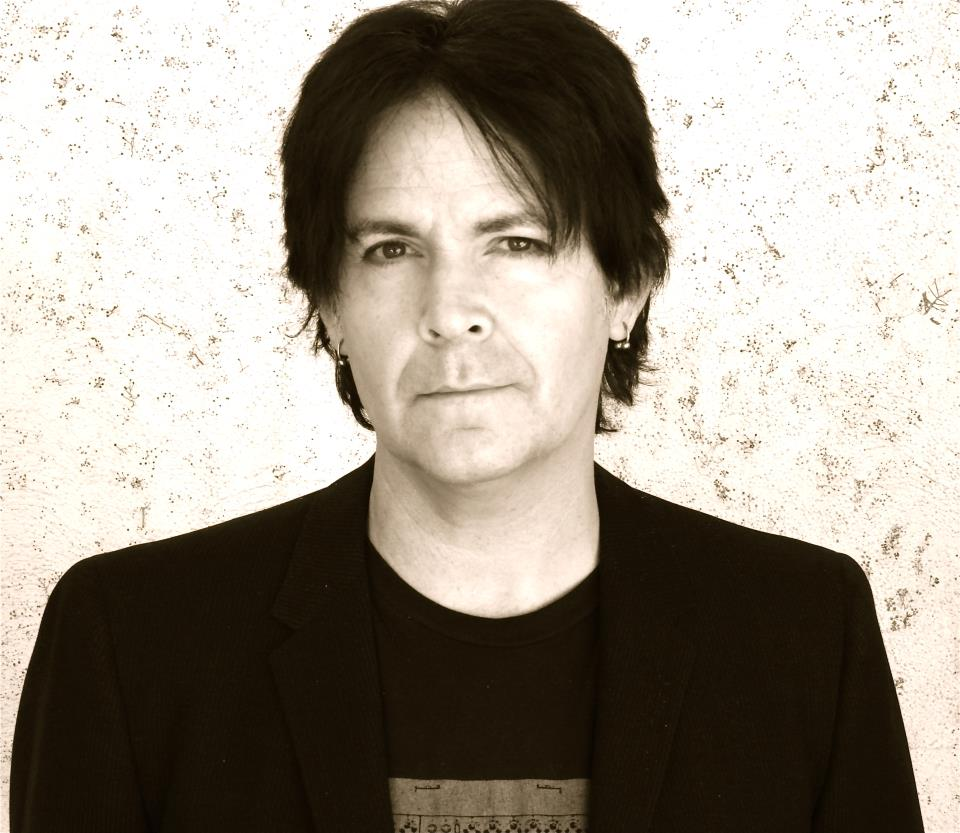
Marc Danzeisen 4
