= Love You to Pieces =

Studio album by Lizzy Borden
- Released: July 1985
- Studio: Music Grinder Studios, Sunswept Studios and MadDog Studios, Los Angeles, California
- Genre: Heavy metal
- Length: 40:45
- Label: Metal Blade
- Producer: Lizzy Borden, Brian Slagel

Lizzy Borden chronology
Give 'Em the Axe (1985)	Love You to Pieces (1985)	The Murderess Metal Road Show (1986)

Professional ratings
Review scores
Source	Rating
AllMusic	3/5 stars
Collector's Guide to Heavy Metal	4/10

Love You to Pieces is the debut studio album by American heavy metal band Lizzy Borden, released in 1985 by Metal Blade Records. The album would produce the song "American Metal" which would later be added to the Metal Blade Records 20th Anniversary box set.

In 2001, the album was re-released by Metal Blade Records with bonus tracks and again on vinyl in 2018 before the release of the band's album My Midnight Things.

== Track listing ==
Side one
No.	Title	Writer(s)	Length
1.	"Council for the Cauldron"	Lizzy Borden, Tony Matuzak, Gene Allen, Michael Davis, Joey Scott Harges	3:12
2.	"Psychopath"	Borden, Allen	3:38
3.	"Save Me"	Borden, Matuzak	4:03
4.	"Red Rum"	Borden, Matuzak, Allen, Davis, Harges	3:53
5.	"Love You to Pieces"	Borden, Matuzak	4:29

Side two
No.	Title	Writer(s)	Length
6.	"American Metal"	Borden	5:54
7.	"Flesheater"	Borden, Davis, Matuzak, Allen, Harges	4:52
8.	"Warfare"	Borden, Matuzak	5:54
9.	"Godiva"	Borden, Matuzak, Allen, Davis, Harges	2:29
10.	"Rod of Iron"	Borden, Matuzak	4:32

2001 reissue bonus tracks
No.	Title	Writer(s)	Length
11.	"Wild One" (demo)	Borden	3:17
12.	"Whiplasher" (live demo)	Borden, Matuzak	2:23
13.	"Warfare" (live demo)	Borden, Matuzak	2:26
14.	"Dirty Pictures" (demo)	Borden	3:44
Total length:			52:41

== Personnel ==
Lizzy Borden

- Lizzy Borden – lead and backing vocals
- Gene Allen – guitars, backing vocals
- Tony Matuzak – guitars
- Michael Davis – bass, backing vocals
- Joey Scott Harges – drums, backing vocals

Additional musicians

- Jon Natisch, Mark Benson, Tony Copozzi – backing vocals

Production

- Randy Burns – engineer
- Eddie Schreyer – mastering at Capitol Records, Los Angeles
- Brian Slagel – executive producer
- Tom Baker – 2001 remastering
