= Retraced =

Studio album by Jake E. Lee
- Released: April 26, 2005
- Genre: Blues rock, hard rock
- Length: 48:31
- Label: Shrapnel
- Producer: Mike Varney, Jake E. Lee, Michael Lardie

Jake E. Lee chronology
A Fine Pink Mist (1996)	Retraced (2005)

Retraced is the second studio album released by American rock guitarist Jake E. Lee. The album features no original material, instead consisting of covers of various bands from Lee's youth.

For the recording of Retraced, Lee recruited former Michael Schenker Group frontman Chris Logan, Tim Bogert of Vanilla Fudge, Cactus and Beck, Bogert & Appice fame, and Aynsley Dunbar, formerly of Journey, Frank Zappa's Mothers of Invention, David Bowie's backing band and Whitesnake.

== Track listing ==
Professional ratings
Review scores
Source	Rating
Allmusic	3.5/5 stars

No.	Title	Writer(s)	Original artist	Length
1.	"Whiskey Train"	Robin Trower, Keith Reid	Procol Harum	4:39
2.	"Evil"	Willie Dixon	Howlin' Wolf (based on the version by Cactus)	3:18
3.	"Way Back to the Bone"	Glenn Hughes	Trapeze	5:34
4.	"I'll Be Creepin'"	Andy Fraser, Paul Rodgers	Free	5:18
5.	"Guess I'll Go Away"	Johnny Winter	Johnny Winter	3:54
6.	"Love Is Worth the Blues"	Leslie West, Jack Bruce, Corky Laing	West, Bruce and Laing	4:26
7.	"I Come Tumblin'"	Mark Farner	Grand Funk Railroad	5:10
8.	"Woman"	Jim Fox, Dale Peters, Joe Walsh	James Gang	4:44
9.	"A Hard Way to Go"	Chris Youlden	Savoy Brown	3:49
10.	"I Can't Stand It"	James Dewar, Trower	Robin Trower	4:28
11.	"Rock Candy"	Denny Carmassi, Bill Church, Sammy Hagar, Ronnie Montrose	Montrose	5:11
Total length:				48:31

== Personnel ==
- Jake E. Lee - guitars, production
- Chris Logan - vocals
- Tim Bogert - bass
- Aynsley Dunbar - drums, percussion

=== Additional personnel ===
- Mike Varney - production
- Michael Lardie - production, engineering
- Tim Gennert - mastering
- Dave Stephens - cover artwork design
- Kelly Garni - photography
