= Rock Gone Wild =

Rock Gone Wild was to be a four-day rock festival, focusing on hard rock, heavy metal and glam rock from four different decades. The inaugural event was scheduled to take place August 20–23, 2009, in Algona, Iowa. The festival was originally slated to take place at the Freedom Park festival ground, and was moved to the Diamond Jo Casino festival grounds before it was eventually cancelled altogether.

Many of the fans who prepurchased tickets lost their money, and some say that the entire event was a fake from the very beginning.

The bill, was to have featured more than 50 bands over four days on two stages, as listed below.

== 2009 lineup that never happened ==
=== Thursday, August 20 ===
- Saxon
- Jackyl
- Warrant
- April Wine
- Honeymoon Suite
- Black 'N Blue
- Tigertailz
- Ernie and the Automatics
- Sick of Sarah
- Savior

=== Friday, August 21 ===
- Puddle of Mudd
- Saliva
- Saigon Kick
- Cherie Currie
- Powerman 5000
- Tyketto
- Marcy Playground
- Rhino Bucket
- Crazy Lixx
- Throw the Fight
- Signum A.D.
- Attention
- Ashamed
- Nero Zero
- Iowa Battle of the Bands winner

=== Saturday, August 22 ===
- Twisted Sister
- Skid Row
- Lita Ford
- Dokken
- Great White
- Kix
- L.A. Guns
- Hardcore Superstar
- Primal Fear
- Dangerous Toys
- Helix
- Junkyard
- Sex Department
- Frankenstein 3000
- Stallion Four
- Mighty Swine

=== Sunday, August 23 ===
- George Thorogood and the Destroyers
- Candlebox
- Sevendust
- Saving Abel
- Eve 6
- Tantric
- Armored Saint
- Lizzy Borden
- Lillian Axe
- Tuff
- Texas Hippie Coalition
- Downtread
- Stuck on Stupid
- Archer
- Fresh Hot Lint
