= Badlands (Badlands album) =

Studio album by Badlands
- Released: May 8, 1989
- Recorded: October 1988 – January 1989
- Studio: One On One Studios, Los Angeles, and The Record Plant, New York City
- Genre: Blues rock; hard rock; glam metal
- Length: 49:33
- Label: Titanium/Atlantic
- Producer: Paul O'Neill & Badlands

Badlands chronology
Badlands (1989)	Voodoo Highway (1991)

Singles from Badlands
- 1. "Dreams in the Dark" / "Hard Driver" Released: 1989

Professional ratings
Review scores
Source	Rating
AllMusic	4/5 stars
Collector's Guide to Heavy Metal	10/10
Rock Hard	9.0/10

Badlands is the debut studio album by the band of the same name. This album features Ray Gillen and Eric Singer, who previously played together in Black Sabbath. This album also features guitarist Jake E. Lee and bassist Greg Chaisson. Singer later played on Chaisson's solo album It's About Time. The album had sold 400,000 copies by 1990, according to Chaisson, in a Hit Parader interview from that year. It was also ranked No. 35 in Rolling Stone's list of 50 Greatest Hair Metal Albums of All Time.

The album features the song "Dreams in the Dark", which the group released as a single and music video.

== Critical reception ==
Kirk Blows, reviewer of British music newspaper Music Week, named LP as "accomplished and worthy debut" and praised its diversity. Billboard called this record "a collection of well-crafted tunes that should jump out of the radio and sound great live."

== Track listing ==
All tracks are written by Jake E. Lee, Ray Gillen and Paul O´Neill, except where noted.

No.	Title	Writer(s)	Length
1.	"High Wire"	Lee, Gillen	3:45
2.	"Dreams in the Dark"		3:29
3.	"Jade's Song"	Lee	1:23
4.	"Winter's Call"	Lee, Gillen, Alex González	5:35
5.	"Dancing on the Edge"		3:27
6.	"Streets Cry Freedom"		6:10
7.	"Hard Driver"		4:50
8.	"Rumblin' Train"		5:46
9.	"Devil's Stomp"		4:54
10.	"Seasons"		6:20

CD & Cassette Bonus Track
No.	Title	Writer(s)	Length
11.	"Ball & Chain"	Lee, Gillen	4:13

== Personnel ==
Badlands

- Ray Gillen – lead vocals, harmonica
- Jake E. Lee – guitars, mandolin, sitar, keyboards
- Greg Chaisson – bass
- Eric Singer – drums

Additional musicians

- Taso Karras – tambourine, maracas
- Bob Kinkel – keyboards programming

Production

- Paul O'Neill – producer
- James A. Ball – engineer, mixing
- Chuck Cavanaugh, Glen Marchese, Joe Henehan, John Mathias, Teddy Trewhella – additional engineering
- Dave Parla, Deek Venarchick – assistant engineers
- David Thoener – mixing
- Jack Skinner – mastering at Europadisk, New York

== Charts ==
Chart (1989)	Peak position
Swedish Albums (Sverigetopplistan)	32
UK Albums (OCC)	39
US Billboard 200	57

== Accolades ==
Publication	Country	Accolade	Rank
Rolling Stone	US	50 Greatest Hair Metal Albums of All Time	35
Loudwire	US	Top 30 Hair Metal Albums	27
Metal Rules	US	Top 50 Glam Metal Albums	43
