= Riverdogs =

US musical group

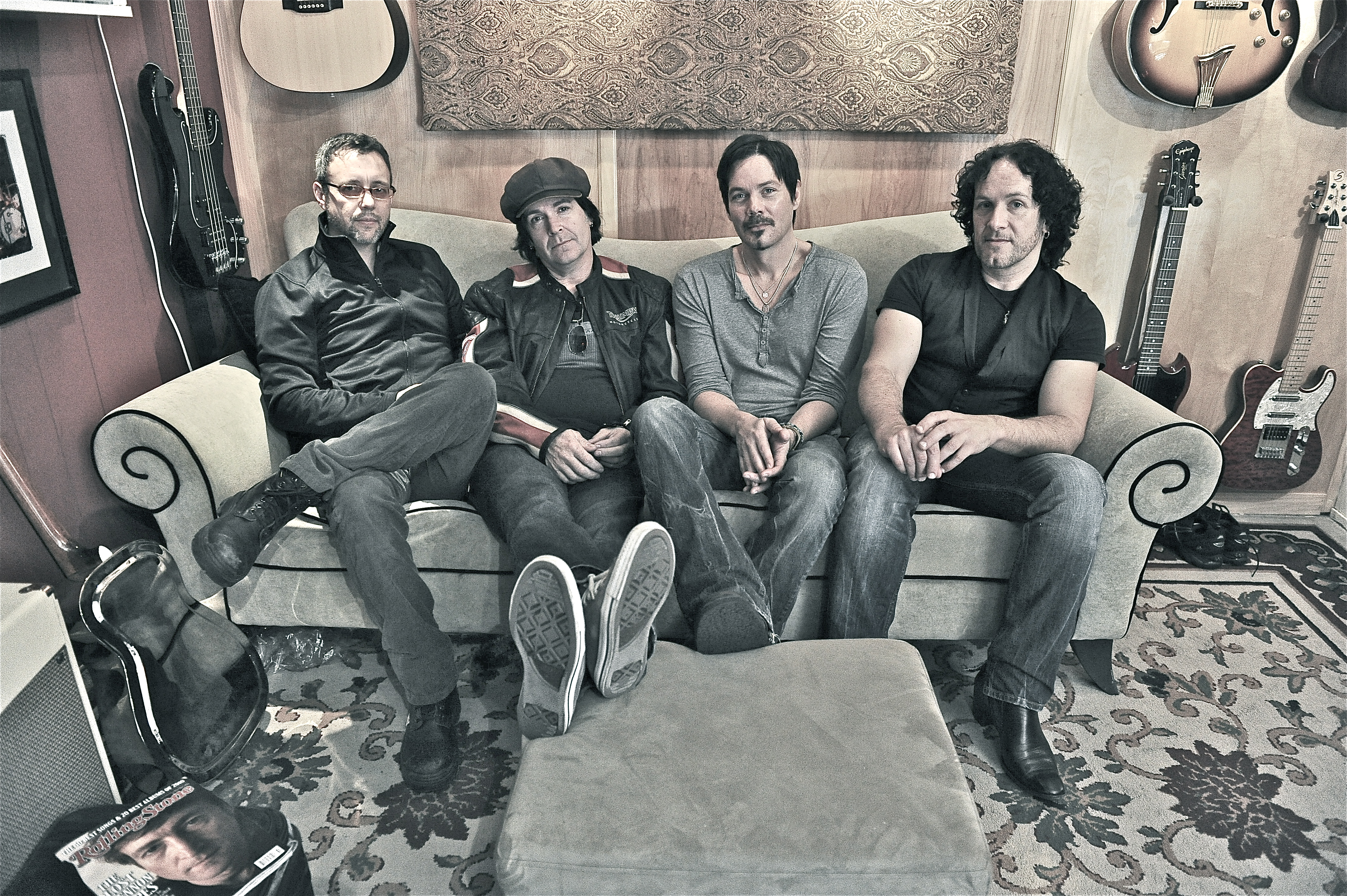
- Riverdogs in 2011

Background information
- Origin: Los Angeles, California
- Genres: Hard rock, blues rock
- Years active: 1989-present
- Members: Rob Lamothe; Nick Brophy; Vivian Campbell; Marc Danzeisen
- Past members: Mike Baird; James Michael; Spencer Sercombe; Cary Beare; Ronnie Ciago

The Riverdogs is a rock band, founded in Los Angeles in 1989.

== Band members ==
Current members

- Rob Lamothe - vocals, guitars, keyboards (1989–present)
- Nick Brophy - bass, guitars, keyboards (1989–present)
- Vivian Campbell - guitars (1989-1992, 2003–present)
- Marc Danzeisen - drums (1990-1992, 2003–present)

Former members

- Mike Baird - drums (1989-1990)
- James Michael - keyboards, guitars, backing vocals (1989)
- Spencer Sercombe - guitars (1989)
- Cary Beare - bass, vocals (1992-2003)
- Ronnie Ciago - drums (1992-2003)

== Recordings ==
Nick Brophy played as a bass guitarist on Riverdogs and played as a guitarist on Absolutely Live and Bone, replacing Vivian Campbell as guitarist, and himself being replaced by Cary Beare on bass guitar.

Vivian Campbell is now playing in Def Leppard and Last in Line.

Rob Lamothe was a guest lead vocalist on the song "The River" on former Badlands bass guitarist Greg Chaisson's solo album It's About Time. Marc Danzeisen also guested on several songs on It's About Time as a backing vocalist and percussionist.

Rob Lamothe and Vivian Campbell have both had solo careers.

Marc Danzeisen went on to play drums with Little Caesar in 1992 and then in 1994 he recorded and toured with Gilby Clarke from Guns N' Roses. Danzeisen has become a leading studio drummer along with producing, and writing songs for commercials, TV and film.

Keyboardist Kevin Gilbert played keyboards on the song "America" from Riverdogs.

Allen DeSilva played drums on the song "America" from Riverdogs.

Riverdogs (Rob Lamothe, Vivian Campbell, Nick Brophy and Marc Danzeisen) signed to MelodicRock Records for an album to be released in the first half of 2011. The result, World Gone Mad features unreleased music from the "lost" 2003 sessions and possibly new songs. A week was spent in Los Angeles working up ideas, and re-mixing and adding new parts to the original songs. Through the latter part of 2016, the Riverdogs were working on an album, recording in Hollywood, CA. The album, California, was released on July 7, 2017.

== Discography ==
- Riverdogs (1990)
- On Air (1990)
- Absolutely Live (1992)
- Bone (1993)
- World Gone Mad (2011)
- California (2017)

=== Singles ===
- I Believe (1990)
- Toy Soldier (1990)
- Revolution Man (1994)
