= Appointment with Death (album) =

Studio album by Lizzy Borden
- Released: October 2007
- Studio: Zanzibar Studios, North Hollywood, California
- Genre: Heavy metal
- Length: 53:32
- Label: Metal Blade
- Producer: Lizzy Borden, Joey Scott Harges

Lizzy Borden chronology
Deal with the Devil (2000)	Appointment with Death (2007)	My Midnight Things (2018)

Professional ratings
Review scores
Source	Rating
AllMusic	3.5/5 stars

Appointment with Death is the sixth studio album by the American heavy metal band Lizzy Borden, released in October 2007 via Metal Blade Records.

== Track listing ==
1. "Abnormal" (Mårten Andersson, Lizzy Borden, Joey Scott Harges) - 5:12
2. "Appointment with Death" (Andersson, Borden, Scott) - 3:47
3. "Live Forever" (Andersson, Ira Black, Borden, Scott) - 5:01
4. "Bloody Tears" (Andersson, Black, Borden, Scott) - 4:48
5. "The Death of Love" (Andersson, Black, Borden, Scott) - 5:17
6. "Tomorrow Never Comes" (Andersson, Black, Borden, Scott) - 4:22
7. "Under Your Skin" (Borden) - 5:06
8. "Perfect World (I Don’t Wanna Live)" (Andersson, Black, Borden, Scott) - 4:53
9. "Somthin’s Crawlin'" (Andersson, Borden, Scott) - 5:43
10. "(We Are) the Only Ones" (Andersson, Black, Borden, Scott) - 4:01
11. "The Darker Side" (Borden) - 5:22
12. "Tomorrow Never Comes" (Acoustic Version) - 4:18 (Japanese Edition bonus track)

== Personnel ==
Lizzy Borden

- Lizzy Borden - vocals, producer
- Ira Black - guitars
- Mårten Andersson - bass
- Joey Scott Harges - drums, producer, engineer

Additional musicians

- Adam Cameron - guitars on "Abnormal" and "Appointment with Death"
- Corey Beaulieu - lead guitar on "Abnormal"
- Jonas Hansson - lead guitar and keyboards on "Appointment with Death"
- George Lynch - lead guitar on "The Death of Love"
- Zane - guitar on "Under Your Skin", "Somethin's Crawlin" and "The Darker Side"
- Erik Rutan - lead guitar on "Somethin's Crawlin", mixing at Mana Sound, Florida
- Dave Meniketti - lead guitar on "The Darker Side"
- Michael T Ross - keyboards
- Marliese Mildenberger - keyboards on "Under Your Skin"
