= Joe Holmes =

American heavy metal guitarist

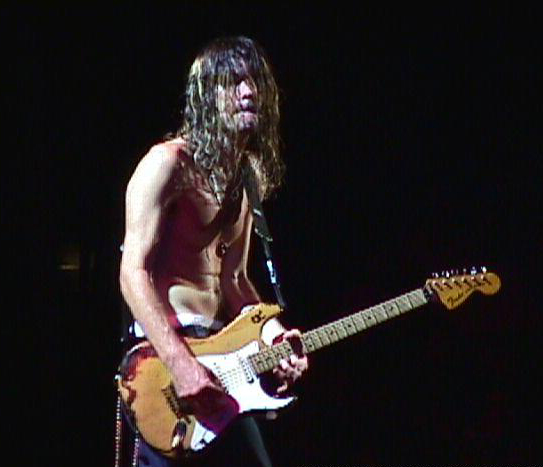
- Holmes at Ozzfest in 1998

Background information
- Born: June 11, 1963 (age 63); New Jersey, U.S.
- Origin: Los Angeles, California, U.S.
- Genres: Heavy metal, hard rock
- Instrument: Guitar
- Years active: 1983–present
- Website: Farmikos.com Facebook

Joe Holmes (born June 11, 1963) is an American heavy metal guitarist best known for his stint with Ozzy Osbourne between 1995 and 2001. He has also played with Van Halen frontman David Lee Roth and the L.A. band Lizzy Borden in addition to leading his own bands, Terriff, and currently, Farmikos.

== Biography ==
Born in New Jersey and raised in Los Angeles, Holmes took lessons from guitarist Randy Rhoads in 1979. Holmes formed Terriff in 1983 but left to join Lizzy Borden in 1987, appearing on the Visual Lies album. He left Lizzy Borden in 1988 and reformed Terriff, staying with the latter group until 1990.

=== David Lee Roth ===
Holmes then joined David Lee Roth's band for a tour in 1991, replacing Jason Becker who was diagnosed with ALS while recording the album A Little Ain't Enough. Back in L.A., Holmes once again re-activated Terriff trying out and rehearsing with different singers, including former Badlands vocalist Ray Gillen. Eventually, the band recruited Jeff Biebuyck to be their new frontman and changed the name from Terriff to Dogma and, finally, Alien Ink recording an album's worth of material with producer Rich Mouser.

=== Ozzy Osbourne ===
In 1995, after Ozzy Osbourne had finished recording the Ozzmosis album, a replacement for Zakk Wylde was needed for the tour. While working on his own band, Joe got a call from Deen Castronovo (Ozzy's drummer) to let him know they were seeking a guitar player. Joe went down to Audible Studios in Los Angeles and played three Ozzy classics. Holmes did not mention that he had taken lessons from Randy Rhoads (former guitarist for Osbourne) as he thought it would hurt his chances at the job. He succeeded though and got the part.

In Ozzy's book "Diary of a Madman: Ozzy Osbourne - The Stories Behind the Songs" it says "Always on the lookout for a bright, new talent, Ozzy spotted a guitarist who plays like a motherfucker" referring to Joe Holmes who had previously worked with David Lee Roth and was a pupil of Randy Rhoads. While on tour, Rhoads would himself take classical guitar tuition and arrange workshops in which he gave lessons to young players. "It's really spooky." said Ozzy, "because when Joe plays the Randy Rhoads stuff, he plays just like him - it's like I can see Randy's fingers."

Holmes performed on the Ozzmosis tour with Osbourne. He started the tour August 19, 1995, at the Austin Music Hall in Austin, Texas. He remained Ozzy's guitarist playing Ozzfest 96 through 2000 tours. Holmes left the band while recording and writing the Down to Earth album. While Holmes does not play on the album, the songs "Can You Hear Them?", "Junkie", and "That I Never Had", which were co-written by Holmes, appear on the album. The only songs from his work with Ozzy that have been released is "Walk on Water", which first appeared on the Beavis and Butt-Head Do America soundtrack, before appearing on the bonus disc for Ozzy's 1997's compilation The Ozzman Cometh and "Perry Mason" live from the 1997 Ozzfest Live CD.

He also participated in the Perry Mason music video.

=== Farmikos ===
In late December 2012, news broke of Holmes' new band Farmikos, featuring former Laidlaw vocalist Robert Locke. The band's name has no particular meaning and was derived from their song "Scapegoat", which was originally titled "Pharmikos". "Pharmikos" was then changed to "Farmikos" for aesthetics. It became the band's name. In early January 2013, the band's website began to stream the song "Scapegoat", the first Farmikos song to surface, with guest contributions from Holmes' former Ozzy Osbourne bandmate, Metallica bassist Robert Trujillo, and Bad Religion drummer Brooks Wackerman. Another song, "The Sound Of My Gun", also featuring Trujillo and Wackerman, premiered in early March 2013. Farmikos continues to record new music with longtime Holmes studio affiliate, engineer/producer Rich Mouser. In late July 2013 Farmikos released a video teaser for the song "Exit Stencils" on the official FARMIKOS YouTube channel. The Video features footage of Holmes recording solo tracks in the studio. In December 2013 two more video teasers were released on the official FARMIKOS YouTube channel for the songs "Spoon and Sun" and "Scapegoat". An EP was announced for February 2014. Recorded at the Mouse House in Pasadena, California with engineer/mixer Rich Mouser (SPOCK'S BEARD, TRANSATLANTIC, VAST), the EP also features guest contributions from Holmes' former Ozzy Osbourne bandmate, bassist Robert Trujillo, and drummer Brooks Wackerman. However, on March 18, 2014, instead of an EP, Farmikos released four digital singles: "Scapegoat", "Kings Of Dust", "Exit Stencils" and "The Sound Of My Gun". The band then continued to release new singles: "Spoon and Sun" was released in May and "Am I One" was released in July, adding, "Fragile", "Ascension" and "I Was Them" as the year went on. In early January 2015, they released "Facing East", just before an album became available on January 15, 2015. This album compiles all the songs released as singles, to date.

=== Solo album ===
On June 5, 2026, Holmes released a self-titled album. Similar to Farmikos, the album features Holmes on guitar, Locke on vocals, and Trujillo on bass, while also featuring former Ozzy Osbourne bandmate Mike Bordin on drums.

== Discography ==
=== with Lizzy Borden ===
- Visual Lies (1987)
- The Decline of Western Civilization Part II: The Metal Years (1988) documentary film
- Best of Lizzy Borden (1994)

=== with Ozzy Osbourne ===
- "Walk on Water" (1996) soundtrack to the Mike Judge film Beavis and Butt-Head Do America
- Ozzfest Live (1997)
- Prince of Darkness (2005)

=== with Farmikos ===
- FARMIKOS (2015) self-titled debut

=== Solo ===
- Joe Holmes (2026)
