= Deal with the Devil (album) =

- Cover art by Todd McFarlane

Studio album by Lizzy Borden
- Released: October 10, 2000
- Recorded: 2000
- Studio: The Crypt, North Hollywood, California
- Genre: Heavy metal
- Length: 49:12
- Label: Metal Blade
- Producer: Elliot Solomon

Lizzy Borden chronology
Master of Disguise (1989)	Deal with the Devil (2000)	Appointment with Death (2007)

Professional ratings
Review scores
Source	Rating
AllMusic	3/5 stars

Deal with the Devil is the fifth studio album by the American heavy metal band Lizzy Borden released in 2000. The album features a cover by comic book artist Todd McFarlane. It was the first album after 11 years and return to form for the band.

The covers of the songs "(This Ain't) The Summer of Love", originally by Blue Öyster Cult, and "Generation Landslide" by Alice Cooper were recorded for the album. The Japanese version includes a cover of Scorpions' "We'll Burn the Sky" as a bonus track.

== Track listing ==
All tracks by Lizzy Borden except where noted.

1. "There Will Be Blood Tonight" – 3:56
2. "Hell Is for Heroes" – 5:11
3. "Deal with the Devil" – 3:45
4. "Zanzibar" – 6:26
5. "Lovin' You Is Murder" – 3:44
6. "We Only Come Out at Night" – 4:34
7. "Generation Landslide" (Michael Bruce, Glen Buxton, Alice Cooper, Dennis Dunaway, Neal Smith) – 4:44 (Alice Cooper Band cover)
8. "The World Is Mine" – 4:56
9. "State of Pain" – 2:56
10. "(This Ain't) the Summer of Love" (Albert Bouchard, Murray Krugman, Don Waller) – 3:46 (Blue Öyster Cult cover)
11. "Believe" – 5:19
12. "We'll Burn the Sky" (Rudolf Schenker, Monika Dannemann) – 5:44 (Scorpions cover, Japan bonus track)

== Personnel ==
=== Lizzy Borden ===
- Lizzy Borden – vocals
- Alex Nelson – rhythm guitar, acoustic guitar, sitar
- Mårten Andersson – bass guitar
- Joey Scott – drums

=== Additional musicians ===
- Louis Cyphre – guitars on all songs
- Dan Fitzgerald – lead guitar on "State of Pain", 12-string acoustic on "Generation Landslide"
- David Michael Phillips, Joe Steals – lead guitars on "Generation Landslide"
- Elliott Solomon – keyboards, producer, engineer, mixing
- Joey Vera – bass on "Lovin' You Is Murder" and "Believe"
- Michael Davis – 4 and 12 string bass on "Zanzibar", "Lovin' You Is Murder" and "The World Is Mine"
