= Ray Gillen =

American singer (1959–1993)

Background information
- Born: Raymond Arthur Gillen; May 12, 1959; New York City, U.S.
- Origin: Cliffside Park, New Jersey, U.S.
- Died: December 1, 1993 (aged 34) New York City, U.S.
- Genres: Hard rock; blues rock; heavy metal
- Occupation: Singer
- Years active: 1978–1993
- Formerly of: Black Sabbath; Phenomena; Blue Murder; Badlands; Sun Red Sun; Rondinelli

Raymond Arthur Gillen (May 12, 1959 – December 1, 1993) was an American rock singer. He is best known for his work with Badlands, in addition to his stint with Black Sabbath in the mid-1980s and recording most of the vocals on Phenomena's Dream Runner album.

== Early life ==
Gillen was born on May 12, 1959, in New York, but was raised in Cliffside Park, New Jersey. He was an only child and started singing while in high school. He played the New Jersey club circuit with various bands, including club bands Quest (1978–80), the punk rock influenced F-66 (1980–81), Savage, and, most notably, Vendetta and Harlette. In 1985, he joined Bobby Rondinelli's band, Rondinelli.

== Career ==
In 1986, Black Sabbath started touring for the Seventh Star album when after only a few shows, singer Glenn Hughes got into a fist-fight and lost his voice due to the related sinus and throat injuries. Gillen was offered the job to replace Hughes. After finishing the Seventh Star tour, Black Sabbath recorded their next album The Eternal Idol with Gillen. However, due to mix of financial burden, writing difficulty (Bob Daisley was recruited for writing as Gillen turned out to be not much of a composer), mismanagement and miscommunication that plagued the band, Gillen and Black Sabbath drummer Eric Singer quit before the album was ever released. Gillen was eventually replaced by Tony Martin, and the vocal track of The Eternal Idol was hurriedly rerecorded note-for-note with Martin before the album was finally released in 1987. However, demo versions of The Eternal Idol featuring Gillen do exist on the bootleg circuit and on the 2010 deluxe Eternal Idol re-release. Also, in an interview Martin revealed that the sinister laugh heard on the track Nightmare is in fact Gillen's voice. The album was re-released on November 1, 2010, in Europe in a 2-disc expanded set including a bonus disc with Gillen's recording.

During the time of the Seventh Star tour, Gillen was asked by project director and co-producer Wilfried F. Rimensberger to join Mel Galley's Phenomena for the recording of the album Dream Runner, which features vocals from Glenn Hughes, John Wetton and Max Bacon. He recorded 4 tracks. Gillen is also featured in Phenomena's 'Did it all for Love' music video although he was not involved in the actual recording of that song.

After the Phenomena recordings, Gillen joined John Sykes (previously with Whitesnake, Thin Lizzy and a different band called Badlands) with the intention to form a new band Blue Murder. Gillen sang demos but parted company when Sykes decided to handle vocals himself.

Gillen then contacted Jake E. Lee (former Ozzy Osbourne guitarist) to form a band. In 1988, Gillen formed Badlands with Lee and recruited his friend Eric Singer with whom he had played in Black Sabbath. Gillen recorded two albums (Badlands and Voodoo Highway) with Badlands and the band toured from 1989 until 1992. They enjoyed moderate commercial success with their first two albums, but tensions between its band members, as well as problems with both management and their label Atlantic Records, hastened the band's demise. Gillen was briefly replaced by John West and Badlands dissolved soon afterwards. In 1998, a third album (Dusk) was released comprising a collection of demos with Gillen recorded in 1992 and 1993.

Following his split from Badlands, Gillen stayed in L.A. and was involved with two projects. He joined forces with drummer Randy Castillo and Iggy Pop band members Whitey Kirst and Craig Pike under the name Cockfight. He also joined the band Terriff, led by guitarist Joe Holmes, fresh off his stint with David Lee Roth on the A Little Ain't Enough tour. Gillen rehearsed with the group for several months before moving back to his native New York. He also went to form the band Sun Red Sun with old friends.

== Personal life and death ==
Ray Gillen died from an AIDS-related disease in a New York hospital on December 1, 1993. Earlier that year, Wilfried F. Rimensberger was planning a remake of his first Metal Hammer Loreley Festival with Gillen on vocals. Gillen called from New York and told Rimensberger that he was too ill to perform.

According to his Badlands bandmate Jake E. Lee, Gillen told him that he tried heroin once with his gay uncle who was later diagnosed with AIDS. Lee theorized that this was how Gillen contracted HIV, calling it a tragic "one in a million" case.

Lee also recalled that "in between the first and the second record, he started getting really thin and didn't look quite as healthy". He was not aware of Gillen's AIDS diagnosis until a meeting with then-Badlands manager Paul O'Neill, who threatened to tell Atlantic Records about Gillen's illness if he was fired by the band. Lee claimed that Gillen denied it, saying "Well, it's not true, so fuck him. Fire him." Lee concluded, "So we did fire him. And he did tell Atlantic Records that. And we got kind of screwed on the second record because of it. They wouldn't even give us tour-support money at all... but, yeah, Paul O'Neill fucked us on that."

Gillen was survived by a daughter, Ashley (born July 1984). He is buried at Fairview Cemetery in Fairview, New Jersey.

=== Legacy ===
In 2006, Gillen was ranked at 100 on Hit Parader's Top 100 Metal Vocalists.

== Discography ==
Year	Band	Title	Notes
1980	F-66	"Give It a Try" b/w "It Doesn't Matter"	7' single
1987	Black Sabbath	The Eternal Idol	Sinister laugh on "Nightmare" (uncredited) & 2010 Deluxe Edition outtakes
1987	Phenomena	Dream Runner	Vocals on "Stop", "No Retreat – No Surrender", "Move – You Lose" & "Emotion Mama"
1987	Savatage	Hall of the Mountain King	Backing vocals on "Strange Wings"
1988	Blue Murder	It's Too Late & Lady Luck (demos)	
1989	Raging Slab	Raging Slab	Backing vocals on "Shiny Mama"
1989	Badlands	Badlands	
1991	Badlands	Voodoo Highway	
1993	George Lynch	Sacred Groove	Vocal on "Flesh and Blood"
1993	Atsushi Yokozeki Project	Raid	Vocal on "Heartbreak"
1995	Sun Red Sun	Sun Red Sun	
1996	Rondinelli	Wardance	Recorded circa 1985
1998	Badlands	Dusk	Recorded in 1992–1993
1998	Ray Gillen	5th Anniversary Memorial Tribute	Studio outtakes from the 1993 Sun Red Sun sessions
2010	Black Sabbath	Live at the Hammersmith Odeon, 2nd June 1986	Seventh Star 2010 Deluxe Edition
