= Ira Black (guitarist) =

American guitarist

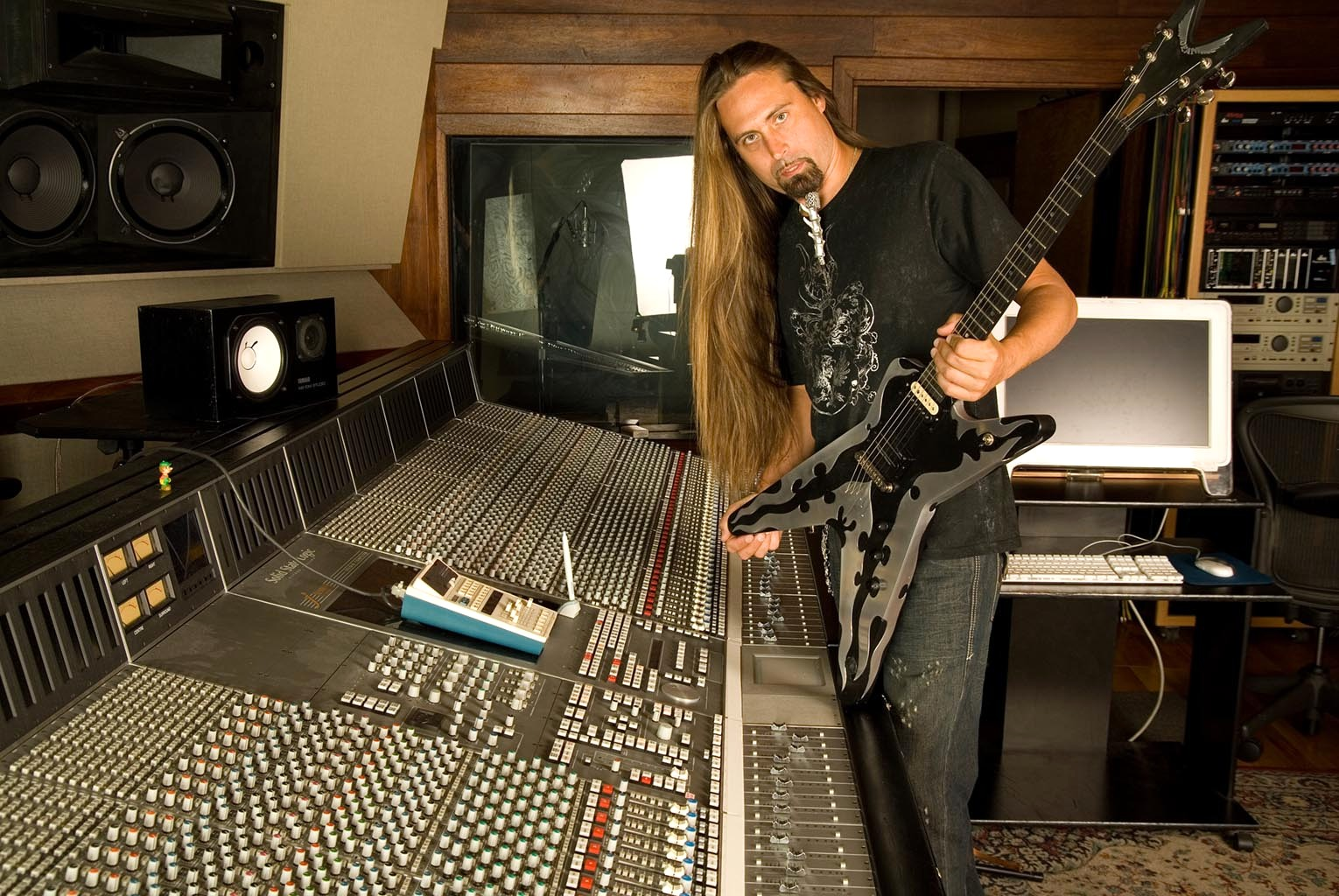
- Ira Black in studio

Background information
- Born: March 23, 1971 (age 54); Sacramento, California, U.S.
- Genres: Heavy metal, thrash metal, glam metal, death metal
- Occupation: Guitarist
- Years active: 1986–present
- Member of: Vio-lence, Dio Disciples
- Formerly of: Bulletboys, Lizzy Borden, Heathen, Metal Church, Vicious Rumors, Chris Caffery, I Am Morbid, Westfield Massacre

Ira Black (born March 23, 1971) is an American heavy metal guitarist. He has played in over 60 bands since the early 1980s and is best known for his work with I Am Morbid, Westfield Massacre, Metal Church, Vicious Rumors, Heathen, Lizzy Borden, Dokken and Bulletboys. Black currently plays lead guitar with Dio Disciples and Vio-lence.

== Career ==
Black joined Lizzy Borden with Metal Blade Records, and played Dean Guitars. He played guitars on the album Appointment with Death in 2007, with writing credit on half the songs.

He recorded "Send in the Clowns" for Carrot Top's Stage Show at the Luxor in Las Vegas with singer Paul Shortino, Tyler Burgess and drummer Vinnie Paul Abbott with Tom Parham.

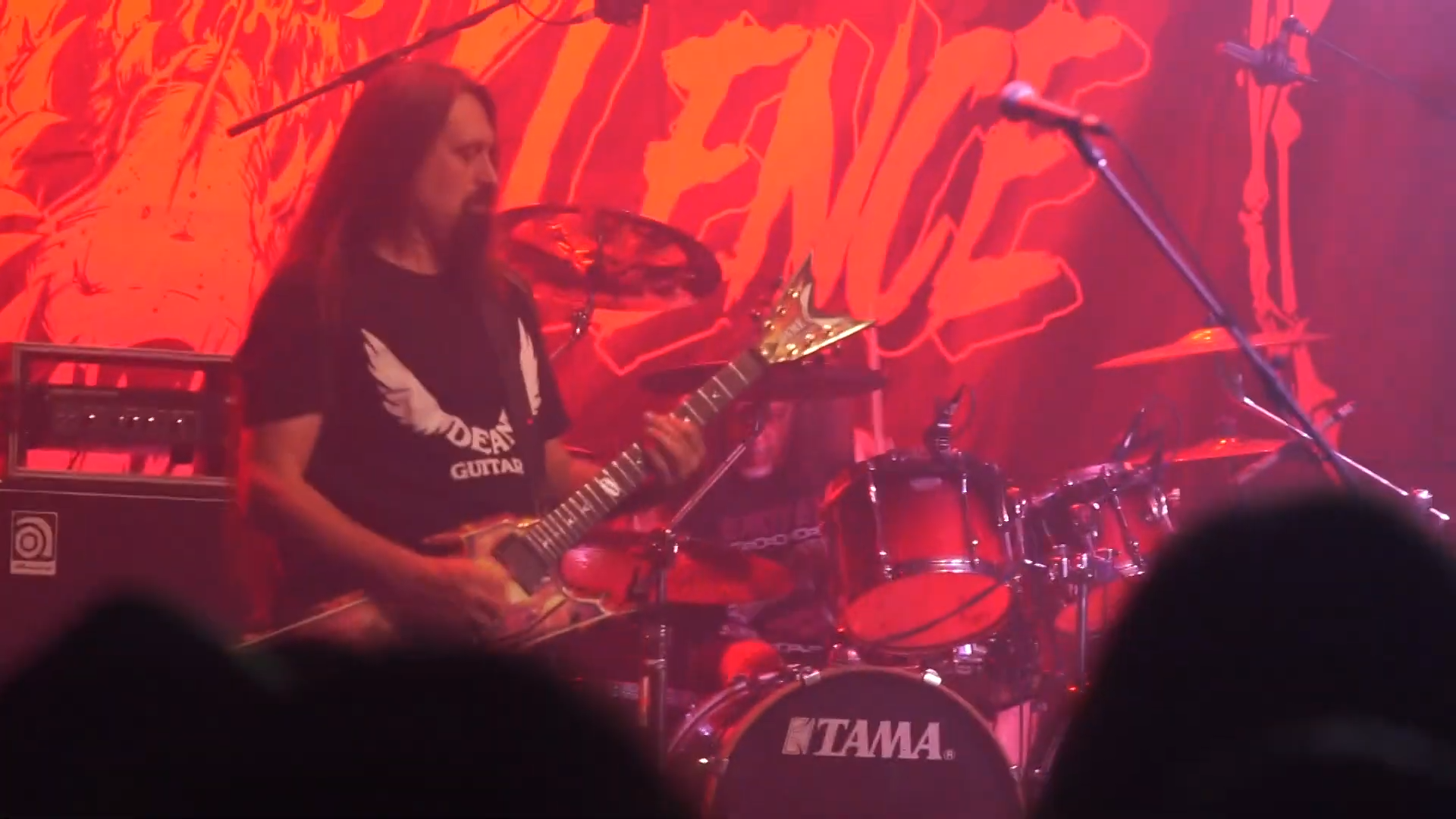
Black performing with Vio-lence in 2022

Black was recruited to cover Phil Demmel's guitar parts for the Vio-lence touring schedule beginning in August 2022. Black continues to play in Vio-lence.

== Personal life ==
Black has been a strict vegan for 20 years. While in LA County jail in 2009 on a traffic violation, Black garnered national media attention by going on a 10-day hunger strike when he was refused vegan meals.
