= Sun Red Sun =

American heavy metal project, 1991–1994

- Sun Red Sun logo.

Background information
- Origin: Jamestown, North Carolina, U.S.
- Genres: Heavy metal; hard rock
- Years active: 1991–1994
- Past members: Al B. Romano; Mike Starr; Bobby Rondinelli; Ray Gillen; John West

Sun Red Sun was an American heavy metal project created by guitarist Al B. Romano. It also featured several prominent musicians: vocalists Ray Gillen of Badlands and Black Sabbath, and John West of Artension and Royal Hunt; drummer Bobby Rondinelli of Rainbow; bassists Mike Starr of Alice in Chains and John McCoy of Gillan; and lead guitarist Chris Caffery of Savatage and Trans-Siberian Orchestra.

== Personnel ==
- Vocals: Ray Gillen, John West, Al B. Romano
- Guitar: Romano, Chris Caffery
- Bass guitar: John McCoy, Mike Starr, Romano
- Drums: Mike Sciotto, Bobby Rondinelli

== Discography ==
=== Sun Red Sun ===
Professional ratings
Review scores
Source	Rating
AllMusic	2.5/5 stars

No.	Title	Length
1.	"I Know a Place"	4:21
2.	"Hard Life"	3:21
3.	"Outrageous"	3:13
4.	"Lock Me Up"	3:26
5.	"Final Curtain" (Instrumental)	3:58
6.	"Responsible"	2:58
7.	"Deadly Nightshade"	4:54
8.	"Big Misunderstanding"	3:29
9.	"Intoxication"	2:16
10.	"How Do You Like Those? (Four King Bananas Missus)" (Instrumental)	1:07
11.	"Outrageous" (Alternative version)	3:28
Total length:		36:31
