= Bobby Rondinelli =

American drummer

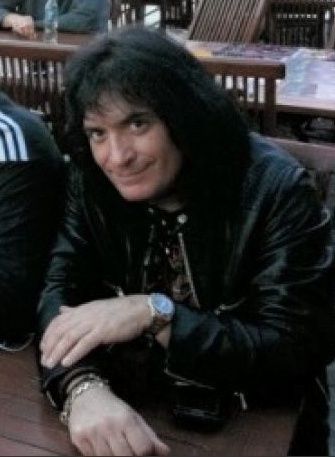
- Rondinelli with Over the Rainbow in 2011

Background information
- Born: Robert Rondinelli; July 27, 1955 (age 70)
- Genres: Hard rock, blues rock, heavy metal
- Occupation: Drummer
- Website: www.twitter.com/BobbyRondinelli

Robert Rondinelli (born July 27, 1955) is an American rock drummer best known for his work with the hard rock/heavy metal bands Blue Öyster Cult, Rainbow, Quiet Riot, Black Sabbath, The Lizards, The Handful, and Rondinelli. In July 2013, Rondinelli was announced as the new drummer for the Axel Rudi Pell band, replacing previous drummer Mike Terrana. Rondinelli has played on subsequent albums and tours, and remains with the band.

== Discography ==
Year	Band	Title	Notes	Cite
1981	Rainbow	Difficult to Cure	Credited as Bob Rondinelli	
2016	Rainbow	Boston 1981		
1982	Rainbow	Straight Between the Eyes		
1982	Rainbow	Live Between The Eyes		
1986	Rainbow	Finyl Vinyl	Rondinelli features on six tracks	
1996	Rondinelli	Wardance	Recorded in 1985	
1989	Doro	Force Majeure		
1993	Quiet Riot	Terrified	On unspecified tracks	
1994	Black Sabbath	Cross Purposes		
1995	Black Sabbath	Cross Purposes Live		
1995	Sun Red Sun	Sun Red Sun		
1999	Sun Red Sun	Lost Tracks		
2000	Sun Red Sun	Sunset		
1998	Blue Öyster Cult	Heaven Forbid	Track 9: "Live for Me"	
1998	McCoy	Brainstorm	Track 9, 13	
1998	Gidget Gein and The Dali Gaggers	Confessions of a Spooky Kid (Just ad Nauseam)		
2000	The Sign	Signs of Life		
2001	Blue Öyster Cult	Curse of the Hidden Mirror		
2002	Blue Öyster Cult	A Long Day's Night		
2002	Rondinelli	Our Cross, Our Sins		
2002	Riot	Through the Storm		
2003	Mark Stein	White Magik		
2003	The Lizards	Rule		
2005	The Lizards	Cold blooded kings		
2005	The Lizards	Live At B.B. King - NYC		
2005	Foghat	Official Bootleg DVD # 1 2002-2004		
2005	The Lizards	They live !		
2006	The Lizards	Against all odds		
2008	The Lizards	Archeology		
2014	Axel Rudi Pell	Into the Storm		
2015	The Lizards	Reptilicus Maximus		
2015	The Handful	Sons of Downtown		
2015	Axel Rudi Pell	Magic Moments: 25th Anniversary Special Show		
2016	Axel Rudi Pell	Game of Sins		
2016	The Last Ditches	Spilt Milk		
2017	Mark Duda	Month of Sundays		
2018	Axel Rudi Pell	Knights Call		
2019	Axel Rudi Pell	XXX Anniversary Live		
2020	Axel Rudi Pell	Sign of the Times		
2021	Axel Rudi Pell	Diamonds Unlocked II		
2022	Michael Schenker Group	Universal	Only on track 4	
2024	Black Sabbath	Anno Domini 1989–1995	Compilation	
