= Ozzy Osbourne discography =

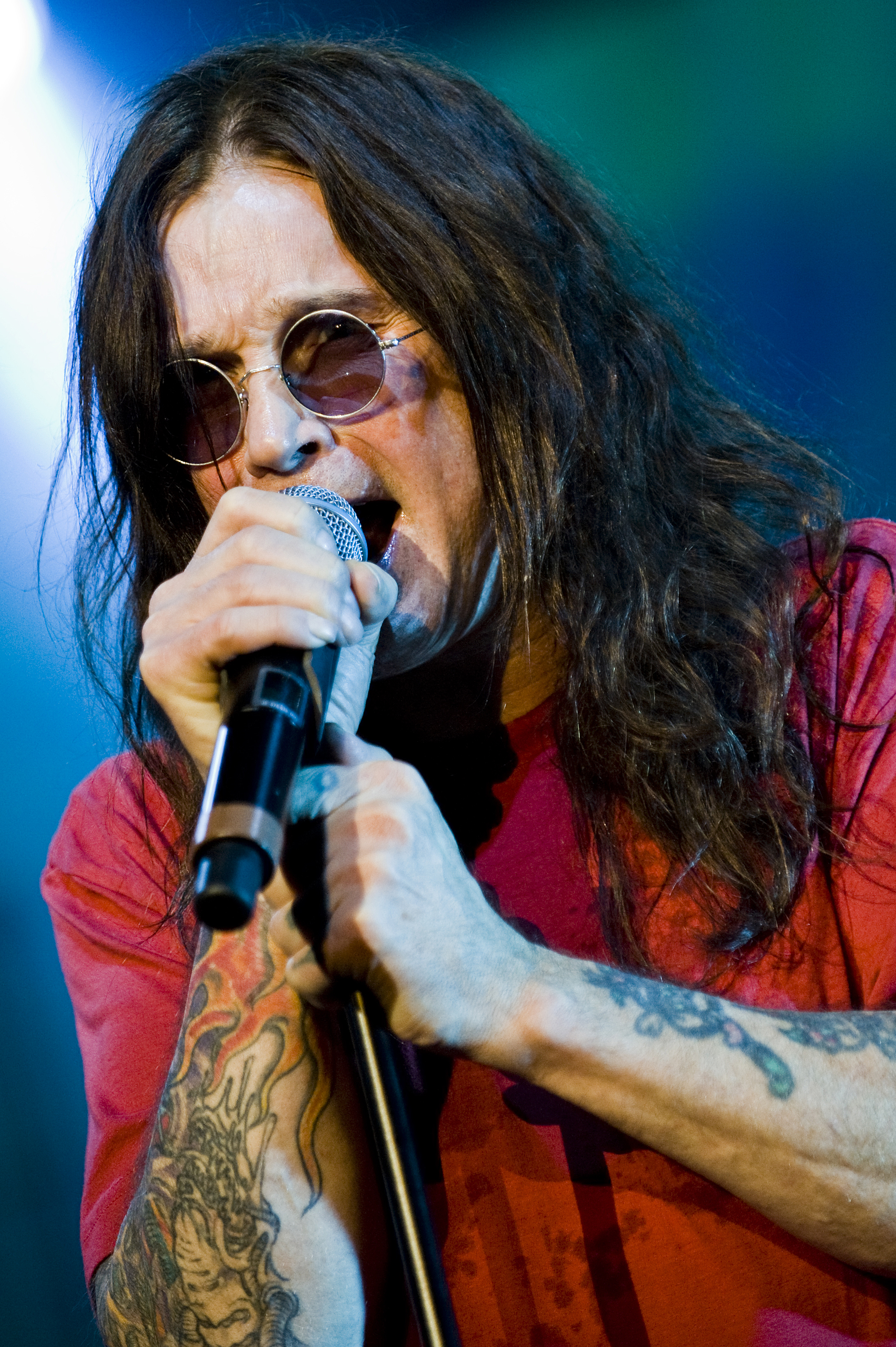
- Osbourne in 2009
- Studio albums: 13
- Extended plays: 5
- Live albums: 5
- Compilation albums: 7
- Singles: 65
- Video albums: 9
- Music videos: 41

The discography of Ozzy Osbourne, an English heavy metal singer, consists of 13 studio albums, five live albums, seven compilation albums, five extended plays (EPs), 65 singles, nine video albums and 41 music videos. After being fired from Black Sabbath in 1979, Osbourne started his solo career with a band consisting of guitarist Randy Rhoads, bassist Bob Daisley and drummer Lee Kerslake. The group released their debut album Blizzard of Ozz in 1980, which reached number 7 on the UK Albums Chart, number 8 on the Canadian Albums Chart, and number 21 on the US Billboard 200. Singles "Crazy Train" and "Mr Crowley" reached the top 50 of the UK Singles Chart, and the album has been certified four times platinum by the Recording Industry Association of America (RIAA). 1981's Diary of a Madman reached the top 20 in the UK, Canada and the US, and was certified triple platinum by the RIAA. The album was the last to feature Daisley and Kerslake, Osbourne of whom were fired from Black Sabbath and replaced by Ronnie James Dio, respectively, as well as the last to feature Rhoads, who died in a plane crash on 19 March 1982.

Osbourne's first live album Speak of the Devil, featuring touring guitarist Brad Gillis, reached number 21 in the UK and number 14 in the US. Jake E. Lee joined in 1983, with Bark at the Moon released later in the year. The album reached number 24 in the UK and number 19 in the US, spawning UK top 40 singles "Bark at the Moon" and "So Tired". The Ultimate Sin followed in 1986, reaching the top ten in the UK and the US. Lead single "Shot in the Dark" reached number 20 on the UK Singles Chart and number 68 on the Billboard Hot 100. The 1987 live album Tribute charted in the top 20 in the UK and the top ten in the US. After Lee was replaced by Zakk Wylde, No Rest for the Wicked was released in 1988 and reached number 23 in the UK and number 13 in the US. The following year, Osbourne reached the top ten of the Hot 100 with Lita Ford on "Close My Eyes Forever", peaking at number 8. 1991's No More Tears reached the UK top 20, the US top ten, and was certified four times platinum by the RIAA. Singles "No More Tears" and "Mama, I'm Coming Home" both reached the UK top 50 and charted on the Billboard Hot 100. In 1992, Osbourne reached the UK Singles Chart top ten for the first time with Was (Not Was) and Kim Basinger on "Shake Your Head", which peaked at number 4.

After briefly retiring, Osbourne returned with Ozzmosis in 1995, which was his first album to reach the top five of the Billboard 200 when it peaked at number 4. Lead single "Perry Mason" reached number 23 on the UK Singles Chart. 1997 compilation The Ozzman Cometh reached the US top 20 and was certified double platinum. In 2001 he released Down to Earth, which reached number 19 in the UK and number 4 in the US. The album spawned the successful single "Dreamer", which was certified gold in Austria and Germany. In 2003, Osbourne collaborated with daughter Kelly on a recording of Black Sabbath's "Changes", which was both artists' first (and to date, only) number-one single in the UK. The Essential Ozzy Osbourne was released the same year, reaching number 21 in the UK. In 2005, Osbourne released an album of cover versions entitled Under Cover, which charted in the UK at number 67. 2007's Black Rain reached number 8 in the UK and number 3 in the US, while 2010's Scream reached number 12 in the UK and number 4 in the US. The compilation Memoirs Of A Madman charted in the UK at number 23 in 2014.

As of 2014, Osbourne has sold more than 100 million albums worldwide, including those during his time in Black Sabbath.

== Albums ==
=== Studio albums ===
List of studio albums, with selected chart positions and certifications
Title	Album details	Peak chart positions										Certifications
Title	Album details	UK	AUS	CAN	FIN	GER	NOR	NZ	SWE	SWI	US	Certifications
Blizzard of Ozz	Released: 12 September 1980; Label: Jet; Formats: LP, CS, 8-track	7	—	8	50	—	30	47	—	94	21	BPI: Gold; MC: Platinum; RIAA: 5× Platinum; ARIA: Gold
Diary of a Madman	Released: October 1981; Label: Jet; Formats: LP, CS, 8-track	14	—	16	—	—	—	42	—	—	16	BPI: Silver; MC: Platinum; RIAA: 3× Platinum
Bark at the Moon	Released: 14 November 1983; Label: Epic/CBS; Formats: LP, CS, 8-track	24	94	23	20	—	—	50	9	—	19	BPI: Silver; MC: Platinum; RIAA: 3× Platinum; ARIA: Gold
The Ultimate Sin	Released: 24 January 1986; Label: Epic/CBS; Formats: CD, LP, CS	8	36	19	3	31	6	21	4	—	6	BPI: Silver; MC: Platinum; RIAA: 2× Platinum; ARIA: Gold
No Rest for the Wicked	Released: 28 September 1988; Label: Epic/CBS; Formats: CD, LP, CS	23	40	—	7	29	12	—	18	26	13	MC: Platinum; RIAA: 2× Platinum; ARIA: Gold
No More Tears	Released: 17 September 1991; Label: Epic; Formats: CD, LP, CS	17	49	17	8	24	12	12	25	37	7	BPI: Silver; MC: 2× Platinum; RIAA: 4× Platinum; ARIA: Gold
Ozzmosis	Released: 23 October 1995; Label: Epic; Formats: CD, LP, CS	22	50	7	9	30	24	26	4	37	4	MC: Platinum; RIAA: 2× Platinum
Down to Earth	Released: 16 October 2001; Label: Epic; Formats: CD, LP, CS	19	46	2	9	15	12	41	1	47	4	BPI: Silver; MC: Platinum; RIAA: Platinum
Under Cover	Released: 1 November 2005; Label: Epic; Formats: CD, CD+DVD	67	—	—	—	—	—	—	50	95	134	
Black Rain	Released: 22 May 2007; Label: Epic; Formats: CD, 2CD, LP, DL	8	37	5	2	9	2	9	2	23	3	MC: Platinum; RIAA: Gold
Scream	Released: 22 June 2010; Label: Epic; Formats: CD, 2CD, 2LP, DL	12	11	4	3	7	9	6	3	8	4	MC: Gold
Ordinary Man	Released: 21 February 2020; Label: Epic; Formats: CD, LP, DL, CS	3	4	3	3	2	3	12	1	2	3	MC: Gold; RIAA: Gold
Patient Number 9	Released: 9 September 2022; Label: Epic; Formats: CD, LP, DL, CS, streaming	2	2	1	2	2	4	6	2	3	3	
"—" denotes a release that did not chart or was not issued in that region.

=== Live albums ===
List of live albums, with selected chart positions and certifications
Title	Album details	Peak chart positions										Certifications
Title	Album details	UK	AUS	CAN	FIN	GER	JPN	NED	NZ	SWE	US	Certifications
Speak of the Devil (Talk of the Devil in the UK)	Released: 19 November 1982; Label: Jet; Formats: 2LP, 2CS	21	—	10	—	—	—	—	—	—	14	BPI: Silver; MC: Gold; RIAA: Platinum
Tribute	Released: 16 April 1987; Label: Epic/CBS; Formats: CD, 2LP, 2CS	13	46	17	13	41	176	—	36	17	6	MC: Gold; RIAA: 2× Platinum; ARIA: Gold
Live & Loud	Released: 7 June 1993; Label: Epic; Formats: 2CD, 2LP, 2CS	—	25	21	34	60	—	55	34	44	22	RIAA: Platinum
Live at Budokan	Released: 25 June 2002; Label: Epic; Format: CD	115	—	—	—	55	—	—	—	45	70	
Ozzy Live	Released: 21 April 2012; Label: Epic/Legacy; Format: LP	—	—	—	—	—	—	—	—	—	—	
"—" denotes a release that did not chart or was not issued in that region.

=== Compilations ===
List of compilation albums, with selected chart positions and certifications
Title	Album details	Peak chart positions										Certifications
Title	Album details	UK	CAN	DEN	FIN	GER	NOR	NZ	SWE	SWI	US	Certifications
The Other Side of Ozzy Osbourne	Released: 25 February 1985; Label: CBS/Sony; Formats: LP, CS	—	—	—	—	—	—	—	—	—	—	
Best of Ozz	Released: 1 March 1989; Label: CBS/Sony; Formats: CD, LP	—	—	—	—	—	—	—	—	—	—	
Ten Commandments	Released: 1990; Label: CBS/Priority; Formats: CD, CS	—	—	—	—	—	—	—	—	—	163	
The Ozzman Cometh	Released: 11 November 1997; Label: Epic; Formats: CD, 2CD, CS	68	7	—	7	—	—	22	21	—	13	IFPI FIN: Gold; MC: Platinum; RIAA: 2× Platinum
The Essential Ozzy Osbourne	Released: 11 February 2003; Label: Epic/Legacy; Format: 2CD	21	8	7	9	19	2	8	3	51	7	BPI: Gold; ARIA: Platinum; IFPI FIN: Gold; RIAA: 2× Platinum; RMNZ: Platinum
Prince of Darkness	Released: 22 March 2005; Label: Epic/Sony BMG; Format: 4CD	—	—	—	—	—	—	—	54	—	36	MC: Gold; RIAA: Gold
Memoirs of a Madman	Released: 14 October 2014; Label: Epic/Legacy/Sony; Formats: CD, 2LP, DL	23	86	—	—	50	—	—	58	71	90	BPI: Gold
See You on the Other Side	Released: 29 November 2019; Label: Epic/Legacy/Sony; Formats: 24×LP	—	—	—	—	7	—	—	—	31	—	
"—" denotes a release that did not chart or was not issued in that region.

== Extended plays ==
List of compilation albums, with selected chart positions and certifications
Title	EP details	Charts		Certifications
Title	EP details	UK	US	Certifications
Mr Crowley Live EP	Released: 7 November 1980; Label: Jet; Formats: 12" vinyl, CS	—	120	
Ultimate Live Ozzy	Released: 21 December 1986; Label: Epic/CBS; Format: 12" vinyl	—	—	
Back to Ozz	Released: 1988; Label: Epic; Formats: CD, 12" vinyl	—	—	
Just Say Ozzy	Released: 6 February 1990; Label: Epic; Formats: CD, 12" vinyl, CS	69	58	RIAA: Gold
iTunes Festival: London 2010	Released: 6 July 2010; Label: Epic/Sony; Format: DL	—	—	
"—" denotes a release that did not chart or was not issued in that region.

== Singles ==
=== 1980s ===
List of singles as lead artist, with selected chart positions and certifications, showing year released and album name
Title	Year	Peak chart positions						Certifications	Album
Title	Year	UK	CAN	IRL	US	US Hard Rock Digi.	US Main	Certifications	Album
"Crazy Train"	1980	25 (Note: "Crazy Train" peaked at number 45 on its original 1980 release in the UK. The song recharted at number 25 following his death in 2025.)	27	—	39 (Note: "Crazy Train" peaked at number 6 on the Billboard Bubbling Under the Hot 100 chart on release, and entered the Hot 100 at number 46 following Osbourne's death, later peaking at number 39.)	1	9	BPI: Platinum; RIAA: 4× Platinum	Blizzard of Ozz
"Mr. Crowley" (live)	1980	46	—	—	—	—	—		Mr. Crowley Live EP
"Mr. Crowley"	1981	—	—	—	—	9	—	RIAA: Gold	Blizzard of Ozz
"Flying High Again"	1981	—	33	—	—	—	2		Diary of a Madman
"You Can't Kill Rock and Roll" [airplay]	1981	—	—	—	—	—	41		Diary of a Madman
"Over the Mountain"	1981	—	—	—	—	—	38		Diary of a Madman
"Tonight"	1982	—	—	—	—	—	—		Diary of a Madman
"Iron Man/Children of the Grave"	1982	—	—	—	—	—	32		Speak of the Devil
"Symptom of the Universe" (live)	1982	100	—	—	—	—	—		Speak of the Devil
"Paranoid" (live)	1983	—	—	—	—	—	25		Speak of the Devil
"Bark at the Moon"	1983	21	—	—	— (Note: "Bark at the Moon" did not enter the Billboard Hot 100, but peaked at number 9 on the Billboard Bubbling Under the Hot 100 chart.)	—	12		Bark at the Moon
"So Tired"	1984	20	—	—	— (Note: "So Tired" did not enter the Billboard Hot 100, but peaked at number 4 on the Billboard Bubbling Under the Hot 100 chart.)	—	—		Bark at the Moon
"Shot in the Dark"	1986	20	—	15	68	10	10		The Ultimate Sin
"The Ultimate Sin"	1986	72	—	—	—	—	—		The Ultimate Sin
"Lightning Strikes"	1986	72	—	—	—	—	—		The Ultimate Sin
"Crazy Train" (live)	1987	99	—	—	—	—	—		Tribute
"Miracle Man"	1988	87	—	—	—	—	—		No Rest for the Wicked
"Crazy Babies"	1988	—	—	—	—	—	—		No Rest for the Wicked
"—" denotes a release that did not chart or was not issued in that region.

=== 1990s ===
List of singles as lead artist, with selected chart positions and certifications, showing year released and album name
Title	Year	Peak chart positions										Certifications	Album
Title	Year	UK	AUT	CAN	GER	NED	SWE	SWI	US	US Hard Rock Digi.	US Main	Certifications	Album
"No More Tears"	1991	32	—	73	—	14	— (Note: "No More Tears" did not enter the Swedish Singellista Chart, but peaked at number 13 on the Swedish Heatseeker Chart.)	—	71	3	10	MC: Platinum	No More Tears
"Mama, I'm Coming Home"	1991	45 (Note: "Mama, I'm Coming Home" peaked at number 46 on its original 1991 release in the UK. The song recharted at number 45 following his death in 2025)	42	36	27	—	86	62	28	1	2	MC: Platinum	No More Tears
"Time After Time" [promo]	1992	—	—	—	—	—	—	—	—	—	6		No More Tears
"Road to Nowhere" [promo]	1992	—	—	—	—	—	—	—	—	10	3		No More Tears
"Mr. Tinkertrain" [promo]	1992	—	—	—	—	—	—	—	—	—	34		No More Tears
"Changes" (live)	1993	77	—	98	—	—	—	—	—	—	9		Live & Loud
"Perry Mason"	1995	23	—	—	—	—	—	—	—	—	3		Ozzmosis
"See You on the Other Side"	1996	—	—	—	—	—	59	—	—	10	5		Ozzmosis
"I Just Want You"	1996	43	—	—	—	—	—	—	—	—	24		Ozzmosis
"Old L.A. Tonight"	1996	—	—	—	—	—	—	—	—	—	—		Ozzmosis
"Walk on Water" [promo]	1996	—	—	—	—	—	—	—	—	—	28		Beavis and Butt-Head Do America soundtrack
"Back on Earth"	1997	—	—	—	—	—	—	—	—	—	3		The Ozzman Cometh
"Pictures of Matchstick Men" (with Type O Negative)	1997	—	—	—	—	—	—	—	—	—	—		Private Parts
"—" denotes a release that did not chart or was not issued in that region.

=== 2000s ===
List of singles as lead artist, with selected chart positions and certifications, showing year released and album name
Title	Year	Peak chart positions											Certifications	Album
Title	Year	UK	AUT	CAN	DEN	GER	IRL	NED	SWE	SWI	US	US Main	Certifications	Album
"Gets Me Through"	2001	18 (Note: "Gets Me Through" and "Dreamer" charted together in the UK and Ireland as a double A-side release.)	—	—	—	89	24	—	27	—	— (Note: "Gets Me Through" did not register on the Billboard Hot 100, but peaked at number 18 on the Billboard Bubbling Under Hot 100 Singles chart, which acts as an extension of the Hot 100.)	2		Down to Earth
"Dreamer"	2001	18	2	—	3	2	24	15	—	10	—	10	BVMI: Gold; IFPI AUT: Gold	Down to Earth
"Changes" (with Kelly Osbourne)	2003	1	31	—	—	15	7	—	26	—	—	—	BPI: Gold	Shut Up
"In My Life"	2005	63	—	—	—	—	—	—	—	—	—	—		Under Cover
"I Don't Wanna Stop"	2007	130	—	21	—	—	—	—	58	—	61	1		Black Rain
"Not Going Away"	2007	—	—	—	—	—	—	—	—	—	—	14		Black Rain
"Black Rain"	2007	—	—	—	—	—	—	—	—	—	—	19		Black Rain
"—" denotes a release that did not chart or was not issued in that region.

=== 2010s–2020s ===
List of singles as lead artist, with selected chart positions and certifications, showing year released and album name
Title	Year	Peak chart positions							Certifications	Album
Title	Year	CAN	SWE	US	US Airplay	US Hard Rock	US Hard Rock Digi.	US Main	Certifications	Album
"How?"	2010	—	—	—	—	—	—	—		non-album single
"Let Me Hear You Scream"	2010	62	6	— (Note: "Let Me Hear You Scream" did not register on the Billboard Hot 100, but peaked at number 10 on the Billboard Bubbling Under Hot 100 Singles chart, which acts as an extension of the Hot 100.)	6	—	—	1		Scream
"Life Won't Wait"	2010	92	—	—	28	—	—	12		Scream
"Let It Die"	2011	—	—	—	41	—	—	21		Scream
"Believer" (live)	2012	—	—	—	—	—	—	—		Ozzy Live
"Under the Graveyard"	2019	—	—	—	8	—	1	1	MC: Gold	Ordinary Man
"Straight to Hell"	2019	—	—	—	48	—	1	16		Ordinary Man
"Ordinary Man" (featuring Elton John)	2020	—	—	—	22	7	1	7		Ordinary Man
"It's a Raid" (featuring Post Malone)	2020	—	—	—	—	—	17	—		Ordinary Man
"Hellraiser" (featuring Lemmy)	2021	—	—	—	—	8	—	—		Non-album single
"Patient Number 9" (featuring Jeff Beck)	2022	—	—	—	5	1	1	1		Patient Number 9
"Degradation Rules" (featuring Tony Iommi)	2022	—	—	—	—	24	13	—		Patient Number 9
"Nothing Feels Right" (featuring Zakk Wylde)	2022	—	—	—	—	—	—	—		Patient Number 9
"One of Those Days" (featuring Eric Clapton)	2022	—	—	—	6	18	—	3		Patient Number 9
"A Thousand Shades" (featuring Jeff Beck)	2023	—	—	—	47	—	—	18		Patient Number 9
"—" denotes a release that did not chart or was not issued in that region.

=== As featured artist ===
List of singles as featured artist, with selected chart positions and certifications, showing year released and album name
Title	Year	Peak chart positions										Certifications	Album
Title	Year	UK	AUS	GER	IRL	NED	NOR	NZ	SWE	US	US Main.	Certifications	Album
"Close My Eyes Forever" (remix) (Lita Ford with Ozzy Osbourne)	1988	47	—	—	—	—	—	16	14	8	25	RIAA: Gold	Lita
"Led Clones" (Gary Moore featuring Ozzy Osbourne)	1989	—	—	—	—	—	—	—	—	—	—		After the War
"The Urpney Song" (Frank Bruno, Billy Connolly and Ozzy Osbourne with Mike Batt and the London Philharmonic Orchestra)	1990	—	—	—	—	—	—	—	—	—	—		The Dreamstone
"Hey Stoopid" (Alice Cooper featuring Ozzy Osbourne, Joe Satriani and Slash)	1991	21	32	—	—	22	5	17	19	78	13		Hey Stoopid
"Therapy" (Infectious Grooves featuring Ozzy Osbourne)	1991	—	—	—	—	—	—	—	—	—	—		The Plague That Makes Your Booty; Move...It's the Infectious Grooves
"Shake Your Head" (Was (Not Was) featuring Kim Basinger and Ozzy Osbourne)	1992	4	47	77	8	—	—	—	39	—	—		Hello Dad... I'm in Jail
"Buried Alive" (Rick Wakeman featuring Ozzy Osbourne)	1999	—	—	—	—	—	—	—	30	—	—		Return to the Centre of the Earth
"Shock the Monkey" (Coal Chamber featuring Ozzy Osbourne)	1999	83	—	—	—	—	—	—	—	—	26		Chamber Music
"N.I.B." (Primus with Ozzy Osbourne)	2000	—	—	—	—	—	—	—	—	—	2		Nativity in Black II: A Tribute to Black Sabbath
"Stillborn" (Black Label Society featuring Ozzy Osbourne)	2003	—	—	—	—	—	—	—	—	—	12		The Blessed Hellride
"Take What You Want" (Post Malone featuring Ozzy Osbourne and Travis Scott)	2019	22	30	—	—	37	12	— (Note: "Take What You Want" did not enter the NZ Top 40 Singles Chart, but peaked at number five on the NZ Hot Singles Chart.)	24	8	26	ARIA: 2× Platinum; BPI: Gold; RIAA: 2× Platinum	Hollywood's Bleeding
"Crack Cocaine" (Billy Morrison featuring Ozzy Osbourne and Steve Stevens)	2024	—	—	—	—	—	—	—	—	—	2		The Morrison Project
"Gods of Rock n Roll" (Billy Morrison featuring Ozzy Osbourne)	2025	—	—	—	—	—	—	—	—	—	8		Non-album single
"—" denotes a release that did not chart or was not issued in that region.

== Videos ==
=== Video albums ===
List of video albums, with selected chart positions and certifications
Title	Album details	Peak chart positions									Certifications
Title	Album details	UK	AUS	AUT	FIN	JPN	NED	SWE	SWI	US	Certifications
Bark at the Moon	Released: 1984; Label: Hendring; Format: VHS, LD	—	—	—	—	—	—	—	—	—	
The Ultimate Ozzy	Released: July 1986; Label: Virgin; Formats: VHS, LD	—	—	—	—	86	—	—	—	3	RIAA: Gold
Wicked Videos	Released: 6 December 1988; Label: Columbia; Formats: VHS, LD	—	—	—	—	—	—	—	—	10	MC: Gold; RIAA: Gold
Don't Blame Me	Released: October 1991; Label: Sony; Formats: VHS, LD	—	20	—	—	—	—	—	—	5	RIAA: Platinum
Live & Loud	Released: 18 May 1993; Label: Sony; Format: VHS, LD	—	—	—	—	284	—	—	—	2	RIAA: Platinum
Live at Budokan	Released: 25 June 2002; Label: Sony; Format: DVD	4	2	—	4	—	9	2	—	1	BPI: Gold; RIAA: Gold
God Bless Ozzy Osbourne	Released: 15 November 2011; Label: Eagle Vision; Formats: DVD, BD	13	9	8	6	141	—	3	—	3	
Speak of the Devil	Released: 17 July 2012; Label: Eagle Vision; Format: DVD, LD	21	28	—	3	83	—	12	—	3	
Memoirs of a Madman	Released: 14 October 2014; Label: Epic/Legacy; Format: 2DVD	2	1	3	—	22	18	1	3	1	
"—" denotes a release that did not chart or was not issued in that region.

=== Music videos ===
List of music videos, showing year released and director(s)
Title	Year	Director(s)	Ref.
As lead artist
"Bark at the Moon"	1983	David Brodsky	
"So Tired"	1984	unknown	
"Shot in the Dark"	1985	Andy Morahan	
"Lightning Strikes"	1986	Andy Morahan	
"The Ultimate Sin"	1986	Andy Morahan	
"Crazy Train" (live)	1987	Wayne Isham	
"Miracle Man"	1988	Wayne Isham	
"Crazy Babies"	1989	Wayne Isham	
"Breaking All the Rules"	1989	Wayne Isham	
"Shot in the Dark" (alternate)	1990	unknown	
"No More Tears"	1991	Ralph Ziman	
"Mama, I'm Coming Home"	1991	Samuel Bayer	
"Mama, I'm Coming Home" (alternate)	1992	Ralph Ziman	
"Road to Nowhere"	1992	Jeb Brien	
"Mr. Tinkertrain"	1992	Jeb Brien	
"Time After Time"	1992	Jeb Brien	
"Changes" (live)	1993	Jeb Brien	
"I Don't Want to Change the World" (live)	1993	Jeb Brien	
"Perry Mason"	1995	Ralph Ziman	
"See You on the Other Side"	1996	Nigel Dick	
"I Just Want You"	1996	Dean Karr	
"Back on Earth"	1997	Nigel Dick	
"Gets Me Through"	2001	Jonas Åkerlund	
"Dreamer"	2002	Rob Zombie	
"Changes" (Ozzy and Kelly Osbourne)	2003	Mike Piscitelli	
"In My Life"	2005	Chris Hafner	
"I Don't Wanna Stop"	2007	Tony T. Ushino	
"How?"	2010	Ernie Fritz	
"Let Me Hear You Scream"	2010	Jonas Åkerlund	
"Life Won't Wait"	2010	Jack Osbourne	
"Let It Die"	2010	Mark Neuman	
"Under the Graveyard"	2019	Jonas Åkerlund	
"Straight to Hell"	2020	unknown	
"Ordinary Man"	2020	Stephen Lee Carr	
"It's a Raid"	2021	Patrik Pope	
"Hellraiser" (Ozzy and Lemmy Killmister)	2021	Mark Szumski and Gina Niespodziani	
"Patient Number 9"	2022	Todd McFarlane co-directed with M. Wartella	
"One of Those Days"	2022		
As featured artist
"Close My Eyes Forever" (remix) (Lita Ford with Ozzy Osbourne)	1989	Jean Pellerin	
"Bombers (Can Open Bomb Bays)" (Bill Ward featuring Ozzy Osbourne)	1990	Keith Shortly	
"Hey Stoopid" (Alice Cooper featuring Ozzy Osbourne, Joe Satriani and Slash)	1991	Ralph Ziman	
"Therapy" (Infectious Grooves featuring Ozzy Osbourne)	1991	Eric Matthies	
"Shake Your Head" (Was (Not Was) featuring Kim Basinger and Ozzy Osbourne)	1992	unknown	
"I Ain't No Nice Guy" (Motörhead featuring Ozzy Osbourne and Slash)	1992	Michael Brillantes	
"Shock the Monkey" (Coal Chamber featuring Ozzy Osbourne)	1999	Dean Karr	
"Stillborn" (Black Label Society featuring Ozzy Osbourne)	2003	Rob Zombie	

== Other appearances ==
List of other appearances, showing year released, other artists and album name
Title	Year	Other artist(s)	Album	Ref.
"Don't Let Me Be Misunderstood" (Nina Simone cover)	1977	Chris Sedgwick	Don't Let Me Be Misunderstood (single)	
"Shake Your Head (Let's Go to Bed)"	1983	Was (Not Was)	Born to Laugh at Tornadoes	
"Close My Eyes Forever"	1988	Lita Ford	Lita	
"Purple Haze" (The Jimi Hendrix Experience cover)	1989	Zakk Wylde, Geezer Butler	Stairway to Heaven/Highway to Hell	
"Bombers (Can Open Bomb Bays)"	1990	Bill Ward	Ward One: Along the Way	
"Jack's Land"	1990	Bill Ward	Ward One: Along the Way	
"Hey Stoopid"	1991	Alice Cooper, Joe Satriani, Slash	Hey Stoopid	
"Therapy"	1991	Infectious Grooves	The Plague That Makes Your Booty Move... It's the Infectious Grooves	
"I Ain't No Nice Guy"	1992	Motörhead, Slash	March ör Die	
"Born to Be Wild" (Steppenwolf cover)	1994	Miss Piggy	Kermit Unpigged	
"Iron Man" (Black Sabbath cover)	1994	Therapy?	Nativity in Black: A Tribute to Black Sabbath	
"Vertical Man"	1998	Ringo Starr	Vertical Man	
"Nowhere to Run (Vapor Trail)"	1998	The Crystal Method, DMX, Ol' Dirty Bastard, Fuzzbubble	Chef Aid: The South Park Album	
"This Means War!!"	1998	Busta Rhymes	E.L.E. (Extinction Level Event): The Final World Front	
"Buried Alive"	1999	Rick Wakeman	Return to the Centre of the Earth	
"Shock the Monkey" (Peter Gabriel cover)	1999	Coal Chamber	Chamber Music	
"N.I.B." (Black Sabbath cover)	2000	Primus	Nativity in Black II: A Tribute to Black Sabbath	
"Iron Man (This Means War)" (Black Sabbath cover)	2000	Busta Rhymes	Nativity in Black II: A Tribute to Black Sabbath	
"For Heaven's Sake 2000"	2000	Tony Iommi, Wu-Tang Clan	Loud Rocks	
"Who's Fooling Who"	2000	Tony Iommi, Bill Ward, Laurence Cottle	Iommi	
"Iron Head"	2001	Rob Zombie	The Sinister Urge	
"Stillborn"	2003	Black Label Society	The Blessed Hellride	
"Tears in Heaven" (Eric Clapton cover)	2005	Various artists	Hurricane Relief: Come Together Now	
"Masters of War" (Bob Dylan cover)	2007	Mountain	Masters of War	
"Wake the Dead"	2008	Alice Cooper	Along Came a Spider	
"Crucify the Dead"	2010	Slash	Slash	
"Iron Man" (live Black Sabbath cover)	2010	Metallica	The 25th Anniversary Rock & Roll Hall of Fame Concerts	
"Paranoid" (live Black Sabbath cover)	2010	Metallica	The 25th Anniversary Rock & Roll Hall of Fame Concerts	
"Gods"	2015	Billy Morrison	God Shaped Hole	

== See also ==
- Black Sabbath discography
