= Memoirs of a Madman (album) =

2014 compilation album by Ozzy Osbourne

Compilation album by Ozzy Osbourne
- Released: 14 October 2014
- Recorded: 1980–2010
- Genre: Heavy metal; hard rock; glam metal
- Length: 77:56
- Label: Epic; Legacy

Ozzy Osbourne chronology
Ozzy Live (2012)	Memoirs of a Madman (2014)	Ordinary Man (2020)

Memoirs of a Madman

Video by Ozzy Osbourne
- Released: 14 October 2014
- Recorded: 1980-2010
- Genre: Heavy metal
- Label: Epic

Ozzy Osbourne video chronology
Speak Of The Devil - Live from Irvine Meadows '82 (2012)	Memoirs of a Madman (2014)

Professional ratings
Review scores
Source	Rating
AllMusic	3/5 stars

Memoirs of a Madman is a CD/DVD compilation album by heavy metal singer Ozzy Osbourne, released by Epic Records and Legacy Recordings on 14 October 2014.

== Track listing ==
=== CD ===
No.	Title	Original album	Length
1.	"Crazy Train"	Blizzard of Ozz	4:56
2.	"Mr. Crowley"	Blizzard of Ozz	4:57
3.	"Flying High Again"	Diary of a Madman	4:39
4.	"Over the Mountain"	Diary of a Madman	4:32
5.	"Bark at the Moon"	Bark at the Moon	4:17
6.	"The Ultimate Sin"	The Ultimate Sin	3:44
7.	"Miracle Man"	No Rest for the Wicked	3:44
8.	"No More Tears" (edit)	No More Tears	5:54
9.	"Mama, I'm Coming Home"	No More Tears	4:12
10.	"Road to Nowhere"	No More Tears	5:12
11.	"Perry Mason"	Ozzmosis	5:54
12.	"I Just Want You"	Ozzmosis	4:56
13.	"Gets Me Through"	Down to Earth	5:05
14.	"Changes" (featuring Kelly Osbourne)	Under Cover	4:07
15.	"I Don't Wanna Stop"	Black Rain	4:02
16.	"Let Me Hear You Scream"	Scream	5:07
17.	"Paranoid" (live at The Roundhouse, London 2010)	Previously unreleased	4:18

=== DVD 1 ===
Music Videos
No.	Title	Length
1.	"Bark at the Moon"
2.	"So Tired"
3.	"The Ultimate Sin"
4.	"Lightning Strikes"
5.	"Crazy Train"
6.	"Miracle Man"
7.	"Crazy Babies"
8.	"Breaking All the Rules"
9.	"No More Tears"
10.	"Mama, I'm Coming Home"
11.	"Mr. Tinkertrain"
12.	"Time After Time"
13.	"Road to Nowhere"
14.	"I Don't Want to Change the World" (live)
15.	"Changes"
16.	"Perry Mason"
17.	"I Just Want You"
18.	"See You on the Other Side"
19.	"Back on Earth"
20.	"Gets Me Through"
21.	"Dreamer"
22.	"In My Life"
23.	"I Don't Wanna Stop"
24.	"Let Me Hear You Scream"
25.	"Life Won't Wait"
26.	"Let It Die"

Bonus Videos
No.	Title	Length
27.	"Mama, I'm Coming Home" (alternate version)
28.	"The Making of "Let Me Hear You Scream""
29.	"The Making of "Life Won't Wait""
30.	"Changes"

=== DVD 2 ===
Performances & Interviews (Rochester, NY 1981)
No.	Title	Length
1.	"I Don't Know"
2.	"Suicide Solution"
3.	"Mr Crowley"
4.	"Crazy Train"

Albuquerque, NM 1982
No.	Title	Length
5.	"Over the Mountain"

MTV 1982 New York
No.	Title	Length
6.	"Fairies Wear Boots"

Entertainment USA 1984 Kansas City, MO 1986
No.	Title	Length
7.	"Bark at the Moon"
8.	"Never Know Why"
9.	"Killer of Giants"
10.	"Thank God for the Bomb"
11.	"Secret Loser"

Philadelphia, PA 1989
No.	Title	Length
12.	"Bloodbath in Paradise"
13.	"Tattooed Dancer"
14.	"Miracle Man"

MTV 1989 Marquee, UK 1991
No.	Title	Length
15.	"Bark at the Moon"

San Diego, CA 1992
No.	Title	Length
16.	"I Don't Want to Change the World"
17.	"Road to Nowhere"

Japan 1992
No.	Title	Length
18.	"No More Tears"
19.	"Desire"

MTV 1992
No.	Title	Length
20.	"Mama, I'm Coming Home"

Studio 1992
No.	Title	Length
21.	"Ozzmosis Recording Sessions 1992"

Ozzfest 1996
No.	Title	Length
22.	"Perry Mason"

Tokyo, Japan 2001
No.	Title	Length
23.	"Gets Me Through"

Ozzfest 2007
No.	Title	Length
24.	"Not Going Away"

Las Vegas, NV 2007
No.	Title	Length
25.	"I Don't Wanna Stop"

London, England 2010
No.	Title	Length
26.	"Let Me Hear You Scream"

Philadelphia, PA 1989
No.	Title	Length
27.	"Flying High Again"

Tokyo, Japan 2001
No.	Title	Length
28.	"Believer"

== Personnel ==
Tracks 1–4

- Ozzy Osbourne - vocals
- Randy Rhoads - guitar
- Bob Daisley - bass
- Lee Kerslake - drums
- Don Airey - keyboards (only on tracks 1 and 2)

Track 5

- Ozzy Osbourne - vocals
- Jake E. Lee - guitar
- Bob Daisley - bass
- Tommy Aldridge - drums
- Don Airey - keyboards

Track 6

- Ozzy Osbourne - vocals
- Jake E. Lee - guitar
- Phil Soussan - bass
- Randy Castillo - drums
- Mike Moran - keyboards

Tracks 7–10

- Ozzy Osbourne - vocals
- Zakk Wylde - guitar
- Bob Daisley - bass
- Randy Castillo - drums
- John Sinclair - keyboards

Tracks 11 and 12

- Ozzy Osbourne - vocals
- Zakk Wylde - guitar
- Geezer Butler - bass
- Deen Castronovo - drums
- Rick Wakeman - keyboards

Tracks 13 and 14

- Ozzy Osbourne - vocals
- Zakk Wylde - guitar
- Robert Trujillo - bass
- Mike Bordin - drums
- Tim Palmer - keyboards

Track 15

- Ozzy Osbourne - vocals
- Zakk Wylde - guitar
- Rob "Blasko" Nicholson - bass
- Mike Bordin - drums

Tracks 16 and 17

- Ozzy Osbourne - vocals
- Gus G - guitar
- Rob "Blasko" Nicholson - bass
- Tommy Clufetos - drums
- Adam Wakeman - keyboards

== Charts ==
Chart (2014)	Peak position
Belgian Albums (Ultratop Wallonia)	117
German Albums (Offizielle Top 100)	50
Scottish Albums (OCC)	27
Swedish Albums (Sverigetopplistan)	58
Swiss Albums (Schweizer Hitparade)	71
UK Albums (OCC)	23
UK Rock & Metal Albums (OCC)	3
US Billboard 200	90
US Top Rock Albums (Billboard)	26
US Top Hard Rock Albums (Billboard)	7

Chart (2025)	Peak position
Canadian Albums (Billboard)	86
Irish Albums (IRMA)	58

== Certifications ==
Region	Certification	Certified units/sales
United Kingdom (BPI)	Gold	100,000^{‡}
^{‡} Sales+streaming figures based on certification alone.
