= The Essential Ozzy Osbourne =

Greatest hits album by Ozzy Osbourne
- Released: 11 February 2003
- Recorded: 1980–2001 (–2007: 3 disc edition)
- Genres: Heavy metal; glam metal; hard rock
- Length: 151:01
- Label: Epic/Legacy
- Producer: Various

Ozzy Osbourne chronology
Live at Budokan (2002)	The Essential Ozzy Osbourne (2003)	Prince of Darkness (2005)

Professional ratings
Review scores
Source	Rating
AllMusic	4/5 stars
Rolling Stone	3/5 stars

The Essential Ozzy Osbourne is a compilation album by British heavy metal singer Ozzy Osbourne, released in 2003. It reached No. 7 on US charts and No. 21 in the UK. Tracks featured here from the first two albums are the re-recorded versions from recent reissues (see Blizzard of Ozz and Diary of a Madman) as well as the remixed Bark at the Moon tracks. The album was certified Gold by the RIAA on 5 February 2005 with an excess of 500,000 copies sold, then certified Platinum by the RIAA on 3 March 2016. This compilation was re-released in 2009 as a Limited Edition 3.0 package with an additional disc of bonus songs that were not on the original release.

The album tracks from Blizzard of Ozz and Diary of a Madman are from the 2002 remasters, for which they were partially re-recorded. The original drum and bass tracks were replaced with recordings by Osbourne's then-current bassist Robert Trujillo and drummer Mike Bordin, as a management response to legal action by original bassist Bob Daisley and drummer Lee Kerslake for unpaid royalty fees.

It does not feature any material from 1986's The Ultimate Sin; however, the limited edition bonus disc does include two tracks from it.

Following Osbourne's death in 2025, The Essential Ozzy Osbourne reached a new peak position of number seven on the US Billboard 200 after previously peaking at number 81 in 2003. In doing so, it became Osbourne's tenth album to reach the top ten on that chart, having last achieved this in 2022 with his studio album Patient Number 9. During the July 18–24 tracking week, The Essential Ozzy Osbourne registered 44,000 equivalent album units, of which 35,000 of those were attributed to streaming.

== Track listing ==
Disc 1
No.	Title	Writer(s)	Originally from	Length
1.	"Crazy Train"	Ozzy Osbourne, Randy Rhoads, Bob Daisley	Blizzard of Ozz (1980)	4:50
2.	"Mr. Crowley"	Osbourne, Rhoads, Daisley	Blizzard of Ozz	4:55
3.	"I Don't Know" (live)	Osbourne, Rhoads, Daisley	Tribute (1987)	5:00
4.	"Suicide Solution"	Osbourne, Rhoads, Daisley	Blizzard of Ozz	4:16
5.	"Goodbye to Romance"	Osbourne, Rhoads, Daisley	Blizzard of Ozz	5:32
6.	"Over the Mountain"	Osbourne, Rhoads, Daisley, Lee Kerslake	Diary of a Madman (1981)	4:31
7.	"Flying High Again"	Osbourne, Rhoads, Daisley, Kerslake	Diary of a Madman	4:38
8.	"Diary of a Madman"	Osbourne, Rhoads, Daisley, Kerslake	Diary of a Madman	6:12
9.	"Paranoid" (live)	Osbourne, Tony Iommi, Geezer Butler, Bill Ward	Tribute	2:52
10.	"Bark at the Moon"	Osbourne, Jake E. Lee, Daisley	Bark at the Moon (1983)	4:15
11.	"You're No Different"	Osbourne, Lee, Daisley	Bark at the Moon	5:49
12.	"So Tired"	Osbourne, Lee, Daisley	Bark at the Moon	4:02
13.	"Rock 'n' Roll Rebel"	Osbourne, Lee, Daisley	Bark at the Moon	5:22
14.	"Crazy Babies"	Osbourne, Zakk Wylde, Daisley, Randy Castillo	No Rest for the Wicked (1988)	4:14
15.	"Miracle Man"	Osbourne, Wylde, Daisley, Castillo, John Sinclair	No Rest for the Wicked	3:44
16.	"Fire in the Sky"	Osbourne, Wylde, Daisley, Castillo, Sinclair	No Rest for the Wicked	6:24
Total length:				76:36

Disc 2
No.	Title	Writer(s)	Originally from	Length
1.	"Breakin' All the Rules"	Osbourne, Wylde, Daisley, Castillo	No Rest for the Wicked	5:13
2.	"Mama, I'm Coming Home"	Osbourne, Wylde, Lemmy Kilmister	No More Tears (1991)	4:11
3.	"Desire"	Osbourne, Wylde, Castillo, Kilmister	No More Tears	5:45
4.	"No More Tears"	Osbourne, Wylde, Mike Inez, Castillo, John Purdell	No More Tears	7:22
5.	"Time After Time"	Osbourne, Wylde	No More Tears	4:20
6.	"Road to Nowhere"	Osbourne, Wylde, Castillo	No More Tears	5:09
7.	"I Don't Want to Change the World" (live)	Osbourne, Wylde, Castillo, Kilmister	Live & Loud (1993)	4:05
8.	"Perry Mason"	Osbourne, Wylde, Purdell	Ozzmosis (1995)	5:53
9.	"I Just Want You"	Osbourne, Jim Vallance	Ozzmosis	4:56
10.	"Thunder Underground"	Osbourne, Wylde, Castillo	Ozzmosis	6:28
11.	"See You on the Other Side"	Osbourne, Wylde, Kilmister	Ozzmosis	6:09
12.	"Gets Me Through"	Osbourne, Tim Palmer	Down to Earth (2001)	5:04
13.	"Dreamer"	Osbourne, Marti Frederiksen, Mick Jones	Down to Earth	4:44
14.	"No Easy Way Out"	Osbourne, Palmer	Down to Earth	5:06
Total length:				74:25

- Some pressings of the compilation omit track 12 on the first disc ("So Tired"). On these editions, "Breaking All the Rules" is added to the end of that disc (as the 16th track), and is thus omitted as the first track of the second disc.

Disc 3 (Limited 3.0 Edition)
No.	Title	Writer(s)	Originally from	Length
1.	"The Ultimate Sin"	Osbourne, Lee, Daisley	The Ultimate Sin (1986)	3:45
2.	"Lightning Strikes"	Osbourne, Lee, Daisley	The Ultimate Sin	5:14
3.	"That I Never Had" (live)	Osbourne, Joe Holmes, Robert Trujillo, Frederiksen	Live at Budokan (2002)	4:15
4.	"I Don't Wanna Stop"	Osbourne, Wylde, Kevin Churko	Black Rain (2007)	3:59
5.	"Black Rain"	Osbourne, Wylde, Churko	Black Rain	4:42
6.	"Changes" (featuring Kelly Osbourne)	Osbourne, Iommi, Butler, Ward	Under Cover (2005)	4:06
Total length:				26:34

== Charts ==
=== Weekly charts ===
2003 weekly chart performance for The Essential Ozzy Osbourne
Chart (2003)	Peak position
Austrian Albums (Ö3 Austria)	23
Danish Albums (Hitlisten)	7
Dutch Albums (Album Top 100)	35
European Albums Chart	29
Finnish Albums (Suomen virallinen lista)	9
German Albums (Offizielle Top 100)	19
New Zealand Albums (RMNZ)	8
Norwegian Albums (VG-lista)	2
Scottish Albums (Official Charts)	25
Swedish Albums (Sverigetopplistan)	3
Swiss Albums (Schweizer Hitparade)	51
UK Albums (Official Charts)	21
US Billboard 200	81

2025 weekly chart performance for The Essential Ozzy Osbourne
Chart (2025)	Peak position
Belgian Albums (Ultratop Flanders)	53
Canadian Albums (Billboard)	6
Polish Albums (ZPAV)	11
US Billboard 200	7

=== Year-end charts ===
Chart (2003)	Position
Swedish Albums (Sverigetopplistan)	44

== Certifications ==
Region	Certification	Certified units/sales
Australia (ARIA)	Platinum	70,000^{‡}
Finland (Musiikkituottajat)	Gold	16,825
New Zealand (RMNZ)	Platinum	15,000^{^}
Norway (IFPI Norway)	Platinum	40,000^{*}
Sweden (GLF)	Gold	30,000^{^}
United Kingdom (BPI)	Gold	100,000^{*}
United States (RIAA)	2× Platinum	2,000,000^{‡}
^{*} Sales figures based on certification alone.^{^} Shipments figures based on certification alone.^{‡} Sales+streaming figures based on certification alone.
