= Living Loud =

American hard rock band (2004–2010)

- Origin: Florida, United States
- Genres: Hard rock, heavy metal
- Years active: 2004–2010
- Labels: Capitol, Liberation
- Past members: Jimmy Barnes; Bob Daisley; Lee Kerslake; Steve Morse
- Website: livingloud.com.au

Living Loud was a supergroup which included bass player and songwriter Bob Daisley, Uriah Heep drummer Lee Kerslake, guitarist Steve Morse (then of Deep Purple) and Cold Chisel singer Jimmy Barnes. Deep Purple keyboardist player Don Airey made a guest appearance.

According to the liner notes of the self-titled album, the project was instigated by Daisley who had discussed with Kerslake the possibility of re-doing some of the songs from the classic rock albums that they had co-written. Six of those songs, "I Don't Know", "Crazy Train", "Flying High Again", "Mr. Crowley", "Tonight" and "Over the Mountain" originally appeared on the Ozzy Osbourne albums Blizzard of Ozz and Diary of a Madman. In 2002, Osbourne had re-issued both albums with Daisley and Kerslake's original performances replaced by new bass and drum tracks after both musicians had sued Osbourne for non-payment of royalties and related issues. Despite playing on Diary of a Madman, Daisley and Kerslake's performances were credited to Rudy Sarzo and Tommy Aldridge for many years.

In August 2003, Daisley, Kerslake, Barnes and Morse recorded the eponymous album in Florida. Along with the Osbourne songs, the group also wrote five new tracks. Airey (who had also worked on the first two Osbourne albums and whose contributions were also uncredited) recorded his parts in London. Living Loud was released in 2004. While Morse and Airey were touring Australia with Deep Purple that year, Living Loud played two live shows, one at the Metro in Melbourne, and one at Fox Studios in Sydney. The latter event was recorded and released on DVD in 2005.

== Discography ==
- Living Loud (2003/2004)
- Live in Sydney 2004 (2005, 2CD/DVD)

== Personnel ==
- Jimmy Barnes - vocals
- Bob Daisley - bass
- Steve Morse - guitar
- Lee Kerslake - drums
- Don Airey - keyboards
