= Living Loud (album) =

Studio album by Living Loud
- Released: 22 June 2004
- Recorded: 18–26 July 2003
- Genre: Hard rock
- Label: Capitol
- Producers: Darren Schneider and Bob Daisley

Living Loud is the self-titled lone album by the hard rock project Living Loud, formed by bass guitarist Bob Daisley and drummer Lee Kerslake in 2003. Both men had previously recorded with Ozzy Osbourne, writing and recording on the Blizzard of Ozz and Diary of a Madman albums. Australian rock singer Jimmy Barnes and Deep Purple guitarist Steve Morse were also part of the project. Keyboard player Don Airey, who also worked on Osbourne's albums with Kerslake and Daisley, recorded his parts of the album at his home studio in London. Half the songs were originals and half were covers from Osbourne's first two albums, which Kerslake and Daisley had co-written.

== Track listing ==
| No. | Title | Writer(s) | Length |
|---|---|---|---|
| 1. | "Last Chance" | Barnes, Daisley, Kerslake, Morse | 3:57 |
| 2. | "I Don't Know" | Daisley, Osbourne, Rhoads | 4:20 |
| 3. | "Every Moment A Lifetime" | Barnes, Daisley, Kerslake, Morse | 7:11 |
| 4. | "Crazy Train" | Daisley, Osbourne, Rhoads | 5:35 |
| 5. | "In the Name of God" | Barnes, Daisley, Kerslake, Morse | 3:35 |
| 6. | "Flying High Again" | Daisley, Kerslake, Osbourne, Rhoads | 5:21 |
| 7. | "Pushed Me Too Hard" | Barnes, Daisley, Kerslake, Morse | 5:48 |
| 8. | "Mr. Crowley" | Daisley, Osbourne, Rhoads | 4:27 |
| 9. | "Tonight" | Daisley, Osbourne, Rhoads, Kerslake | 5:16 |
| 10. | "Walk Away" | Barnes, Daisley, Kerslake, Morse | 5:12 |
| 11. | "Over the Mountain" | Daisley, Kerslake, Osbourne, Rhoads | 5:15 |

== Personnel ==
Living Loud

- Jimmy Barnes – vocals
- Bob Daisley – bass
- Steve Morse – guitar
- Lee Kerslake – drums
- Don Airey – keyboards

== Charts ==
Chart performance for Living Loud
| Chart (2004) | Peak position |
|---|---|
| Australian Albums (ARIA) | 86 |
