= Prince of Darkness (Ozzy Osbourne album) =

Box set by Ozzy Osbourne
- Released: 22 March 2005
- Recorded: 1980–2005
- Genres: Heavy metal; hard rock; alternative metal; glam metal
- Length: 4:08:48
- Label: Epic
- Producer: Mike Muir

Ozzy Osbourne chronology
The Essential Ozzy Osbourne (2003)	Prince of Darkness (2005)	Under Cover (2005)

Professional ratings
Review scores
Source	Rating
AllMusic	3/5 stars
Rolling Stone	3.5/5 stars

Prince of Darkness is a box set of four CDs by Ozzy Osbourne released in 2005. The first two CDs are Osbourne's solo work containing various studio recordings, live tracks, b-sides, demos and outtakes. Disc three consists of collaborations, and disc four consists of newly recorded cover songs. The covers were released on a stand-alone album entitled Under Cover later in the year.

Notably, the album tracks from Blizzard of Ozz and Diary of a Madman included in the set are taken from the 2002 remasters of those albums, for which the original drum and bass tracks were replaced with new recordings by Osbourne's then-current bassist Robert Trujillo and drummer Mike Bordin, as a management response to legal action by original bassist Bob Daisley and drummer Lee Kerslake for unpaid royalty fees. Likewise, the tracks from Bark at the Moon are similarly taken from the 2002 remaster, for which they were remixed and altered.

== Track listing ==
Disc One: 1981–1983
No.	Title	Writer(s)	Original album	Length
1.	"I Don't Know" (live)	Ozzy Osbourne, Randy Rhoads, Bob Daisley	Tribute (1987)	5:02
2.	"Mr. Crowley"	Osbourne, Rhoads, Daisley	Blizzard of Ozz (1980)	4:56
3.	"Crazy Train"	Osbourne, Rhoads, Daisley	Blizzard of Ozz (1980)	4:49
4.	"Goodbye to Romance" (live)	Osbourne, Rhoads, Daisley	Tribute (1987)	5:24
5.	"Suicide Solution" (live)	Osbourne, Rhoads, Daisley	Tribute (1987)	7:58
6.	"Over the Mountain"	Osbourne, Rhoads, Daisley, Lee Kerslake	Diary of a Madman (1981)	4:32
7.	"Flying High Again" (live)	Osbourne, Rhoads, Daisley, Kerslake	Tribute (1987)	4:26
8.	"You Can't Kill Rock and Roll"	Osbourne, Rhoads, Daisley	Diary of a Madman (1981)	6:43
9.	"Diary of a Madman"	Osbourne, Rhoads, Daisley, Kerslake	Diary of a Madman (1981)	6:13
10.	"Bark at the Moon" (live)	Osbourne, Jake E. Lee, Daisley	"So Tired" B-side (1983)	4:23
11.	"Spiders"	Osbourne, Lee, Daisley	Bark at the Moon (1983)	4:28
12.	"Rock 'n' Roll Rebel"	Osbourne, Lee, Daisley	Bark at the Moon (1983)	5:22
13.	"You're No Different"	Osbourne, Lee, Daisley	Bark at the Moon (1983)	5:49
Total length:				70:05

Disc Two: 1986–2001
No.	Title	Writer(s)	Original album	Length
1.	"The Ultimate Sin" (live)	Osbourne, Lee, Daisley	The Ultimate Ozzy (1986)	4:43
2.	"Never Know Why" (live)	Osbourne, Lee, Daisley	The Ultimate Ozzy (1986)	4:43
3.	"Thank God for the Bomb" (live)	Osbourne, Lee, Daisley	The Ultimate Ozzy (1986)	4:00
4.	"Crazy Babies"	Osbourne, Zakk Wylde, Daisley, Randy Castillo	No Rest for the Wicked (1988)	4:15
5.	"Breakin' All the Rules"	Osbourne, Wylde, Daisley, Castillo, John Sinclair	No Rest for the Wicked (1988)	5:12
6.	"I Don't Want to Change the World" (demo)	Osbourne, Wylde, Castillo, Lemmy	Previously unreleased	3:56
7.	"Mama, I'm Coming Home" (demo)	Osbourne, Wylde, Lemmy	Previously unreleased	4:08
8.	"Desire" (demo)	Osbourne, Wylde, Castillo, Lemmy	Previously unreleased	5:01
9.	"No More Tears"	Osbourne, Wylde, Mike Inez, Castillo, John Purdell	No More Tears (1991)	7:23
10.	"Won't Be Coming Home" (S.I.N. demo)	Osbourne, Wylde, Castillo	Previously unreleased	4:59
11.	"Perry Mason" (live)	Osbourne, Wylde, Purdell	The Ozzfest Live (1997)	5:56
12.	"See You on the Other Side" (demo)	Osbourne, Wylde, Lemmy	Previously unreleased	6:34
13.	"Walk on Water" (demo)	Osbourne, Jim Vallance	Beavis and Butt-Head Do America (1996)	4:41
14.	"Gets Me Through" (live)	Osbourne, Tim Palmer	Live at Budokan (2002)	4:28
15.	"Bang Bang (You're Dead)" ("Facing Hell" demo)	Osbourne, Palmer, Scott Humphrey, Geoff Nicholls	Previously unreleased	4:33
16.	"Dreamer"	Osbourne, Marti Frederiksen, Mick Jones	Down to Earth (2001)	4:45
Total length:				79:17

Disc Three: "With Friends"
No.	Title	Writer(s)	Original album	Length
1.	"Iron Man" (Black Sabbath cover featuring Therapy?)	Tony Iommi, Osbourne, Geezer Butler, Bill Ward	Nativity in Black (1994)	5:26
2.	"N.I.B." (Black Sabbath cover featuring Primus)	Iommi, Butler, Ward, Osbourne	Nativity in Black II (2000)	5:58
3.	"Purple Haze" (The Jimi Hendrix Experience cover)	Jimi Hendrix	Stairway to Heaven/Highway to Hell (1989)	4:22
4.	"Pictures of Matchstick Men" (Status Quo cover featuring Type O Negative)	Francis Rossi	Private Parts: The Album (1997)	6:02
5.	"Shake Your Head (Let's Go to Bed)" (featuring Was (Not Was))	Don Was, David Was, Jarvis Stroud	Born to Laugh at Tornadoes (1983)	3:55
6.	"Born to Be Wild" (Steppenwolf cover featuring Miss Piggy)	Mars Bonfire	Kermit Unpigged (1994)	3:29
7.	"Nowhere to Run (Vapor Trail)" (featuring The Crystal Method, DMX, Ol' Dirty Bastard and Fuzzbubble)	Osbourne, DMX, Jack Blades, John Eaton, Ken Jordan, Ol' Dirty Bastard, Rick Rubin, Scott Kirkland	Chef Aid: The South Park Album (1998)	4:44
8.	"Psycho Man" (featuring Black Sabbath)	Osbourne, Iommi	Reunion (1998)	5:18
9.	"For Heaven's Sake 2000" (featuring Tony Iommi and Wu-Tang Clan)	Osbourne, Iommi, Bob Marlette, Cappadonna, Masta Killa, Inspectah Deck, RZA	Loud Rocks (2000)	4:57
10.	"I Ain't No Nice Guy" (featuring Motörhead and Slash)	Lemmy	March ör Die (1992)	4:15
11.	"Therapy" (featuring Infectious Grooves)	Mike Muir, Robert Trujillo	The Plague That Makes Your Booty Move...It's the Infectious Grooves (1991)	3:25
12.	"Stayin' Alive" (Bee Gees cover featuring Dweezil Zappa)	Barry Gibb, Robin Gibb, Maurice Gibb	Previously unreleased	4:39
13.	"Dog the Bounty Hunter"	Mark Hudson	Previously unreleased	0:53
Total length:				57:23

Disc Four: "Under Cover"
No.	Title	Writer(s)	Original artist	Length
1.	"21st Century Schizoid Man"	Robert Fripp, Michael Giles, Greg Lake, Ian McDonald, Peter Sinfield	King Crimson	3:52
2.	"Mississippi Queen"	Leslie West, Felix Pappalardi, Corky Laing, David Rea	Mountain	4:09
3.	"All the Young Dudes"	David Bowie	Mott the Hoople	4:36
4.	"In My Life"	John Lennon, Paul McCartney	The Beatles	3:29
5.	"Fire"	Arthur Brown, Vincent Crane, Mike Finesilver, Peter Ker	The Crazy World of Arthur Brown	4:09
6.	"For What It's Worth"	Stephen Stills	Buffalo Springfield	3:20
7.	"Sympathy for the Devil"	Mick Jagger, Keith Richards	The Rolling Stones	7:12
8.	"Working Class Hero"	Lennon	John Lennon	3:24
9.	"Good Times"	Jenkins, McCulloch, Eric Burdon, John Weider, Vic Briggs	Eric Burdon and The Animals	3:46
10.	"Changes" (featuring Kelly Osbourne)	Iommi, Osbourne, Butler, Ward	Black Sabbath	4:06
Total length:				42:03

== Charts ==
Chart performance for Prince of Darkness
Chart (2005)	Peak position
Canadian Albums (Nielsen SoundScan)	24
Swedish Albums (Sverigetopplistan)	54
UK Rock & Metal Albums (Official Charts)	20
US Billboard 200	36

== Certifications and sales ==
Certifications and sales for Prince of Darkness
Region	Certification	Certified units/sales
Canada (Music Canada)	Gold	50,000^{^}
United States (RIAA)	Gold	125,000^{^}
^{^} Shipments figures based on certification alone.
