= Ozzmosis =

Studio album by Ozzy Osbourne
- Released: 23 October 1995
- Recorded: 1994–1995
- Studios: Guillaume Tell (Paris); Right Track (New York); Electric Lady (New York); Bearsville (Woodstock)
- Genre: Heavy metal
- Length: 56:45
- Label: Epic
- Producer: Michael Beinhorn

Ozzy Osbourne chronology
| Live & Loud (1993) | Ozzmosis (1995) | The Ozzman Cometh (1997) |

Singles from Ozzmosis
- 1. "Perry Mason" Released: 13 November 1995; 2. "See You on the Other Side" Released: 29 February 1996; 3. "I Just Want You" Released: 19 August 1996

Ozzmosis is the seventh studio album by the English heavy metal singer Ozzy Osbourne. Recorded in Paris and New York with producer Michael Beinhorn, it was released on 23 October 1995 by Epic Records. The album reached number 22 on the UK Albums Chart and number four on the US Billboard 200. "Perry Mason", "See You on the Other Side" and "I Just Want You" were released as singles.

After the release of his sixth album No More Tears in 1991, Osbourne announced that he would retire from music. However, he returned with Ozzmosis in 1995, which featured long-time guitarist Zakk Wylde as well as former Black Sabbath bassist Geezer Butler and drummer Deen Castronovo. Producer Michael Beinhorn played most of the keyboards on the album, while Rick Wakeman played the Mellotron on the songs "Perry Mason" and "I Just Want You". Osbourne later appeared as a guest vocalist on Wakeman's 1999 album Return to the Centre of the Earth.

Ozzmosis received mixed reviews from critics. It was one of many Osbourne albums remastered and reissued in 2002. The reissue featured bonus tracks "Whole World's Fallin' Down" and "Aimee", originally released as B-sides to "Perry Mason" and "See You on the Other Side", respectively. The album has been certified double platinum by the Recording Industry Association of America and has sold over 2 million copies.

== Recording and production ==
Recording took place at Guillaume Tell Studios in Paris, France, Right Track Recording and Electric Lady Studios in New York City, and Bearsville Studios in Woodstock, New York. Production was led by Michael Beinhorn, with Paul Northfield engineering and David Bianco mixing. Writing credits on the album – alongside Osbourne, guitarist Zakk Wylde and bassist Geezer Butler – were shared by John Purdell, Jim Vallance, Mark Hudson, Steve Dudas, Lemmy Kilmister, Duane Baron and Steve Vai.

Ozzmosis was Ozzy's first and only album to feature Butler, drummer Deen Castronovo and keyboardist Rick Wakeman. Guitars were by his long-time band member Wylde, although Steve Vai was originally slated to perform on the album after writing songs with Osbourne in 1994 (of which only "My Little Man" remained). In a 2023 interview, Vai said that he "is sitting on a whole Ozzy album" from this time. Vai reportedly left the project due to a "falling out" with Osbourne, although Wylde maintains they remained friends.

Prior to Beinhorn's involvement, Ozzmosis was to be produced by Michael Wagener, who had mixed the preceding No More Tears. Songs were recorded with Wagener, and a different lineup including bassist Mike Inez and drummer Randy Castillo, with the intention of making the album sound similar to No More Tears. Pre Production with that lineup happened at Granny's House Recording Studio in Reno, NV in early 1994 after the "No More Tours" Tour. However, with seven songs completed, Epic Records allegedly requested a change in production style and replaced Wagener with Beinhorn. Of Wagener's produced material, "Perry Mason", "See You on the Other Side", "Tomorrow" and "Old LA Tonight" were rerecorded with Beinhorn, "Aimee" and "Living with the Enemy" were released as B-sides, and "Slow Burn" remained unreleased. Wagener's version of "See You on the Other Side" was later released on 2005 box set Prince of Darkness and his demo of "Perry Mason" was released in 2005.

Ozzy said that as much as he liked Ozzmosis, particularly for being able to record with Butler again, it was his most difficult production, owing to both pressure on following the successful No More Tears and Beinhorn's methods. "After doing Ozzmosis with Michael Beinhorn producing," Ozzy remarked in 2001, "I didn't care if I never made another album again. There'd be these fucking mind games. He'd have me singing all day, and then I'd get three-quarters through and he'd go, 'Your voice sounds tired. Let's pick it up tomorrow.' And I knew that the next day he'd go, 'Your voice has changed. Let's start again.'" Ozzy took to heavy drinking and painkillers to deal with the recording sessions, leading to an incident where are after combining vodka and codeine he had stolen from a doctor, Ozzy had breathing problems, only surviving as an assistant called said doctor.

== Promotion and release ==
Three singles were released from Ozzmosis. The first was "Perry Mason" in November 1995, which reached number 23 on the UK Singles Chart and number three on the Billboard Mainstream Rock Songs chart. "See You on the Other Side", send to US radio on 9 January 1996, charted at number five on the Mainstream Rock chart and released in Europe and Japan in late February. In Sweden it charted at number 59. The third and final single, "I Just Want You", charted in the UK at number 43 and in the US at number 24 on the Mainstream Rock chart.

In support of the album, Osbourne and his band completed the Retirement Sucks! Tour, named in reference to Osbourne's previous tour, the No More Tours Tour, which was originally slated to be his last before his retirement from music. The tour started in Monterrey and Mexico City on 26–28 August. Speaking about his return to touring, Osbourne joked that "If you stayed at home, day in and day out, for 3 years with your wife and a house full of screaming kids, you'd want to get back out on the road too!" The tour continued through 1996.

== Reception ==
=== Commercial ===
Ozzmosis charted at number 22 on the UK Albums Chart, five places lower than its predecessor No More Tears and three places lower than its successor Down to Earth. It was more successful in the United States, reaching number four on the Billboard 200, the highest position achieved by Osbourne on the chart at the time. The album also reached the top ten in Finland and Sweden, the top 30 in Germany, New Zealand and Norway, the top 40 in Switzerland, and the top 50 in Australia.

By the end of 1995, Ozzmosis was certified platinum by the Recording Industry Association of America, indicating US sales of over 1 million units; in April 1999, the RIAA certified the album double platinum. The album was also certified platinum by Music Canada, indicating sales in the country of over 80,000 units. According to Billboard magazine, Ozzmosis has sold in excess of 3 million copies in total. As of the 2010 release of Scream, Ozzmosis is the latest Osbourne studio album to be certified multi-platinum by the RIAA.

=== Critical ===
Professional ratings
Review scores
| Source | Rating |
|---|---|
| AllMusic | 2/5 stars |
| Entertainment Weekly | C |

Ozzmosis received mostly mixed reviews from critics. Writing for music website AllMusic, Stephen Thomas Erlewine criticised the album for its lack of evolution from previous releases No Rest for the Wicked and No More Tears. Despite praising the "still impressive" skills of guitarist Zakk Wylde, Erlewine condemned the "modern-rock conscious" production style of producer Michael Beinhorn, which he claimed was the cause of the album's main problem – that "on the surface, the music is hard and loud, but it actually sounds smooth and processed". Entertainment Weekly critic Chuck Eddy claimed that due to the long running lengths of tracks on the album, Ozzmosis "feels like a parody of the most overinflated opera".

Retrospectively, writers for both Blabbermouth.net and PopMatters have criticised Ozzmosis in reviews of later Ozzy Osbourne albums. Nick DeRiso of Ultimate Classic Rock ranked Ozzmosis as the eighth best Osbourne album, ahead of only Down to Earth, Under Cover and Scream, criticising the production style of the album. Writing for Loudwire on the 20th anniversary of the album, Jon Wiederhorn described Ozzmosis as "a more sonically pristine, but natural extension of the type of melodic hard rock/metal songwriting" on Osbourne's previous two albums, noting the presence of "raging rockers ... fist-raising anthems ... and teary ballads".

== Track listing ==
Standard edition
| No. | Title | Writer(s) | Length |
|---|---|---|---|
| 1. | "Perry Mason" | Ozzy Osbourne, Zakk Wylde, John Purdell | 5:53 |
| 2. | "I Just Want You" | Osbourne, Jim Vallance | 4:53 |
| 3. | "Ghost Behind My Eyes" | Osbourne, Mark Hudson, Steve Dudas | 5:11 |
| 4. | "Thunder Underground" | Osbourne, Geezer Butler, Wylde | 6:30 |
| 5. | "See You on the Other Side" | Osbourne, Lemmy Kilmister, Wylde | 6:10 |
| 6. | "Tomorrow" | Osbourne, Wylde, Purdell, Duane Baron | 6:37 |
| 7. | "Denial" | Osbourne, Hudson, Dudas | 5:12 |
| 8. | "My Little Man" | Osbourne, Steve Vai, Kilmister | 4:52 |
| 9. | "My Jekyll Doesn't Hide" | Osbourne, Butler, Wylde | 6:34 |
| 10. | "Old L.A. Tonight" | Osbourne, Wylde, Purdell | 4:50 |
| Total length: | | | 56:45 |

2002 reissue bonus tracks
| No. | Title | Writer(s) | Length |
|---|---|---|---|
| 11. | "Whole World's Fallin' Down" | Osbourne, Tommy Shaw, Jack Blades | 5:06 |
| 12. | "Aimee" | Osbourne, Wylde | 4:45 |
| Total length: | | | 66:36 |

== Personnel ==
- Ozzy Osbourne – vocals
- Zakk Wylde – guitar
- Geezer Butler – bass
- Deen Castronovo – drums

Additional musicians

- Rick Wakeman – keyboards
- Michael Beinhorn – keyboards

Production staff

- Michael Beinhorn – production
- Michael Wagener – production ("Aimee")
- Paul Northfield – engineering
- John Bleich – engineering assistance
- Matt Curry – engineering assistance
- Chris Laidlaw – engineering assistance
- Joe Pirrera – engineering assistance
- Rodolphe Sanguinetti – engineering assistance
- Brian Sperber – engineering assistance
- David Bianco – mixing
- George Marino – mastering
- Vic Anesini – mastering (reissue)
- David Coleman – art direction
- Rocky Schenck – photography
- Phil Alexander – liner notes (reissue)

== Charts ==
| Chart (1995–1996) | Peak position |
|---|---|
| Australian Albums (ARIA) | 50 |
| Canada Top Albums/CDs (RPM) | 7 |
| Estonian Albums (Eesti Top 10) | 4 |
| European Albums Chart | 15 |
| Finnish Albums (Suomen virallinen lista) | 9 |
| German Albums (Offizielle Top 100) | 30 |
| Japanese Albums (Oricon) | 7 |
| New Zealand Albums (RMNZ) | 26 |
| Norwegian Albums (VG-lista) | 24 |
| Scottish Albums (Official Charts) | 40 |
| Swedish Albums (Sverigetopplistan) | 4 |
| Swiss Albums (Schweizer Hitparade) | 37 |
| UK Albums (Official Charts) | 22 |
| UK Rock & Metal Albums (Official Charts) | 2 |
| US Billboard 200 | 4 |

== Certifications ==
| Region | Certification | Certified units/sales |
|---|---|---|
| Canada (Music Canada) | Platinum | 100,000^{^} |
| Japan (RIAJ) | Gold | 100,000^{^} |
| United States (RIAA) | 2× Platinum | 2,000,000^{^} |
^{^} Shipments figures based on certification alone.
