= Speak of the Devil (Ozzy Osbourne album) =

Live album by Ozzy Osbourne
- Released: 19 November 1982
- Recorded: 27 September 1982 by Record Plant Mobile
- Venues: The Ritz, New York City
- Genre: Heavy metal
- Length: 70:16
- Labels: Jet; Epic
- Producer: Max Norman

Ozzy Osbourne chronology
Diary of a Madman (1981)	Speak of the Devil (1982)	Bark at the Moon (1983)

Singles from Speak of the Devil
- 1. "Iron Man/Children of the Grave" Released: 27 November 1982; 2. "Symptom of the Universe" Released: 10 December 1982 (UK); 3. "Paranoid" Released: 3 February 1983 (US)

Professional ratings
Review scores
Source	Rating
AllMusic	2.5/5 stars
Martin Popoff	8/10 stars
Sounds	5/5 stars

Speak of the Devil is a live album by English heavy metal singer Ozzy Osbourne, released on 19 November 1982 by Jet Records in the United Kingdom and on 22 November in the US. It is a double album consisting entirely of live renditions of songs originally recorded by Osbourne's previous band Black Sabbath. The album was entitled Talk of the Devil in the UK, that being the more commonly expressed idiom there.

In the UK, it was the second of four Osbourne albums to attain Silver certification (60,000 units sold) by the British Phonographic Industry, achieving this in January 1983.

== Background ==
=== Planned album with Rhoads ===
In early February 1982, a decision was made by Osbourne's management and record label to record a live album consisting entirely of songs he had recorded in the 1970s with Black Sabbath. Several factors led to this decision. Sabbath's publishing deal with their previous management had recently expired; by re-recording these songs all the songwriters (including Osbourne) would benefit from the publishing royalties. Additionally, Jet Records had cut a distribution deal with CBS Records which saw the small label stand to make a sizeable profit from the release. Business decisions aside, Black Sabbath was also readying its own live album release and Osbourne wanted his album in stores first. "We were both going through our own miseries," recalled Sabbath bassist Geezer Butler. "We couldn't afford not to release Live Evil and Ozzy was forced into making Speak of the Devil."

The plan to record an album of Black Sabbath covers was not met with enthusiasm by Osbourne's band. Guitarist Randy Rhoads and drummer Tommy Aldridge refused to participate, feeling that they had established themselves as recording artists and such an album would be a step backwards professionally. They shared their feelings with bassist Rudy Sarzo; although Sarzo was not completely comfortable refusing to participate, he chose to stand with his bandmates and the trio informed manager Sharon Arden of their decision.

Although Sharon took the news reasonably well, Ozzy was furious. He responded by going on what Sarzo described as "the worst drinking binges I had ever witnessed" and his relationship with Rhoads never fully recovered. It was during this tumultuous period that Osbourne was infamously arrested for drunkenly urinating on the Alamo. Several hours before the Alamo incident, he drunkenly fired the entire band (including Rhoads), although he later had no memory of doing so. Osbourne frequently confronted Rhoads on the tour bus and taunted him with claims that the likes of Frank Zappa and Gary Moore were willing to replace him for the live album. Osbourne's unstable and confrontational behavior soon convinced Rhoads to leave the band. He grudgingly agreed to perform on the live album but would depart after fulfilling his contractual obligations to Jet Records, which consisted of one more studio album and subsequent tour.

The original plan was to record the album at Toronto's Maple Leaf Gardens. The show, complete with half-naked girls on the stage in what manager Sharon anticipated would be "the greatest rock spectacle ever," would also be videotaped and released for the burgeoning home video market. These plans all crumbled upon Rhoads' sudden death weeks later in a plane crash.

=== Arrival of Brad Gillis ===
After the death of Rhoads, the band carried on for a short time with guitarist Bernie Tormé, until both parties agreed that the arrangement was not working out. Guitarist Vito Bratta, who was playing in a New York area Black Sabbath cover band at the time, was considered as his replacement but he clashed with Sharon and later lamented that he had blown his big break. Guitarist Brad Gillis arrived in New York City from California on April 5, 1982, to audition for Osbourne's band. Sharon dispatched Sarzo to Gillis' hotel room to teach him the songs. Though Gillis was vaguely familiar with Osbourne's music after seeing the band perform live the previous summer at the Day on the Green in Oakland, he was completely unfamiliar with Black Sabbath's music. He borrowed a friend's old Black Sabbath albums to become more familiar with the songs before leaving for New York City. His ability to faithfully reproduce Rhoads' parts earned Gillis the job, and he subsequently traveled with the band and became familiar with the material as Bernie Tormé played his last few shows before leaving. On April 12, 1982, Gillis performed with the band during soundcheck before a show in Binghamton, New York, and played his first show with the band later that evening. Tormé was described as "the consummate professional" during this period, staying with the band until Gillis was ready to step in, even waiting backstage during Gillis' first few shows in case he was needed.

=== Rehearsals ===
On September 19, 1982, the band and crew arrived in New York City to begin rehearsals for the two shows that would be recorded to comprise the Speak of the Devil album. Over the following few days, Gillis, Sarzo, and Aldridge would rehearse in what Sarzo described as a "gloomy midtown Manhattan studio" while Osbourne himself was nowhere to be found. The band was given only five days to learn the songs, though in Aldridge's case, he was quite familiar with Black Sabbath's material after opening for the band countless times as a member of Black Oak Arkansas in the 1970s. As the band began rehearsing, Sharon arrived and informed them, "Now boys, don’t expect to see much of Ozzy at rehearsals. He’s not being very cooperative."

The record company planned to include previously recorded live versions of "Iron Man", "Children of the Grave", and "Paranoid" featuring Rhoads on guitar, so Sharon told the band to not bother rehearsing those particular songs. As rehearsals continued without Ozzy, the band was still coming to terms with the loss of Rhoads, and morale was very low. The band members resented the fact that they were rehearsing for an Ozzy Osbourne album while Osbourne himself could not be bothered to show up. It was during this period that Sarzo, who was already recording the Metal Health sessions in secret with Quiet Riot, made his final decision to leave Osbourne's band.

== Recording ==
Osbourne, who had not rehearsed the songs with his band at all, finally showed up for soundcheck the day of the first show on September 26, 1982, and had tremendous difficulty remembering the lyrics to many of the songs. During the shows, he placed a folding chair with a desk lamp on top of it at center stage, and placed a notebook with handwritten lyrics to the songs on the chair. Throughout the shows, he often stood by this chair, singing as he read the lyrics from the notebook.

The Ritz, which held just under 1,000 people, was sold-out for the performances. Sarzo described the audiences as "rowdy", and also described the acoustics of the converted Latin ballroom as warm, intimate, and perfect for their needs. The band typically used side-fill monitors to allow the musicians to hear the drums while playing on larger stages, but the Ritz's smaller stage forced them to be removed for these shows. This change forced Gillis and Sarzo to spend the majority of the shows standing directly in front of the drum riser in order to hear Aldridge's drums over the intense volume of the band's backline.

The mood during the shows was casual, as the usual spectacle of Osbourne's live performances was scaled back with the emphasis instead placed on capturing the tightest possible performances for the recordings. The Record Plant's mobile studio was parked in an alley behind the Ritz to capture the performances on tape. The band members dressed down, not wearing their usual stage clothes, with Osbourne himself sporting sweatpants and a bald head after drunkenly shaving off his familiar long hair a few days prior.

Near the ends of the shows, as "Iron Man", "Children of the Grave" and "Paranoid" came up in the setlist, the band let loose and made less effort to play tight, as they had been told by management that these performances would not be included on Speak of the Devil; previously recorded live versions of those songs featuring Rhoads on guitar were to be used instead. A decision was later made to save the Rhoads versions for a future release, and thus the versions of those songs which ultimately appeared on Speak of the Devil were taken from one of the performances at The Ritz. Sarzo recalled listening to the final mixes of those songs and being appalled at how sloppy his playing was on those three tracks, as they had only run through them a couple of times in rehearsal.

As the band, minus Osbourne, flew back to Los Angeles on September 28 after completing the shows, Gillis played them the demo recordings he had made with Night Ranger that would comprise the band's soon-to-be released debut album, while Sarzo played them the new Quiet Riot recordings he had been working on in secret. Upon arriving in Los Angeles, Sarzo promptly quit Osbourne's band and officially rejoined Quiet Riot, prompting a long and bitter feud with Osbourne that would culminate in the vocalist assaulting him backstage at the US Festival in 1983. Gillis also left Osbourne's band shortly thereafter, returning to Night Ranger weeks later. Speak of the Devil represents the only official Osbourne recording to feature the guitarist's work.

Album producer Max Norman stated in 2007 that due to a limited budget, he had Osbourne and the band perform an entire extra show with no audience in the afternoon of either the 26th or 27 September. Norman recorded that performance in the event that the actual live shows were not of suitable quality for release. "At least we've got a choice and we'll have more material to draw from", he said of this decision. According to Norman, the finished album features three songs from that performance with crowd noise later added in post-production. Though Norman did not specifically identify which tracks he was referring to, he said "If you got nothing to do for a couple of days you could just lie there and listen to them in the headphones and figure out which songs had the real audience and which ones didn't." Soundboard recordings of both night's performances exist and both have appeared on bootleg releases. However all of the tracks appearing on Speak of the Devil, with the exception of "Sabbath Bloody Sabbath", were recorded at the 27 September show. "Sabbath Bloody Sabbath" was not played at either of the Ritz concerts and the recorded version included on Speak of the Devil is believed to have come from the afternoon recording referenced by Norman.

== Other ==
A double album, Speak of the Devil represents the fulfillment of a contractual obligation, as Osbourne owed Jet Records two more records. Though the album has long been a fan favourite, Osbourne himself publicly renounced Speak of the Devil, stating that it was only released to satisfy a contractual obligation. The live versions of "Iron Man", "Children of the Grave" and "Paranoid" featuring Randy Rhoads which were originally intended to be part of Speak of the Devil were eventually released in 1987 on Tribute, an album dedicated to the memory of the deceased guitarist.

Though they had been full-time members of Osbourne's band for some time, this is Osbourne's first album to feature bassist Sarzo and drummer Aldridge. The duo had been credited on the 1981 Diary of a Madman album but did not actually perform on it. Speak of the Devil's gatefold photo includes a member of Osbourne's road crew (who took part in the stage show by bringing the vocalist drinks between songs) who suffered from dwarfism and who Osbourne nicknamed "Ronnie", a joke aimed at Ronnie James Dio. Dio had replaced Osbourne as Black Sabbath's lead vocalist and stood only 5' 4" tall.

Speak of the Devil was released around two months before Osbourne's former band, Black Sabbath, released their own live album entitled Live Evil, a situation which contributed to a growing rivalry between the two camps. In the US, sales of Speak of the Devil were much better than those of Live Evil, while in the UK it was Live Evil which attained the higher chart-placing: figures on ultimate sales are not widely available.

The original CD release of Speak of the Devil omitted the song "Sweet Leaf", presumably due to time constraints. It was, however, reinstated for the 1995 reissue of the album.

== Track listing ==
All songs written by Ozzy Osbourne, Tony Iommi, Geezer Butler and Bill Ward.

Side A
No.	Title	Original album	Length
1.	"Symptom of the Universe"	Sabotage (1975)	5:41
2.	"Snowblind"	Vol. 4 (1972)	4:56
3.	"Black Sabbath"	Black Sabbath (1970)	6:04

Side B
No.	Title	Original Album	Length
4.	"Fairies Wear Boots"	Paranoid (1970)	6:33
5.	"War Pigs"	Paranoid	8:35
6.	"The Wizard"	Black Sabbath	4:43

Side C
No.	Title	Original Album	Length
1.	"N.I.B."	Black Sabbath	5:35
2.	"Sweet Leaf"	Master of Reality (1971)	5:55
3.	"Never Say Die"	Never Say Die! (1978)	4:18

Side D
No.	Title	Original Album	Length
4.	"Sabbath Bloody Sabbath"	Sabbath Bloody Sabbath (1973)	5:34
5.	"Iron Man"/"Children of the Grave"	Paranoid / Master of Reality	9:12
6.	"Paranoid"	Paranoid	3:10

== Video ==
A Japan-only official release video also entitled Speak of the Devil has been available since the early 1980s. This video release has no relation to the album of the same name, consisting of Osbourne's early solo material rounded out by three Black Sabbath numbers. This video release features an outdoor live performance recorded on 12 June 1982, at Irvine Meadows Amphitheatre with the same backing band as the album of the same name. The recording was done by MTV and originally broadcast on the cable network on 31 October 1982, under the title "MTV Halloween Live from Irvine".

Being an outdoor show, wind resulted in insufficient haze from the fog machines to reflect the laser light show, and thus they weren't used; the lasers seen in the final edit were added later in post-production. On 16 July 1982, the band members gathered at Jet Records' offices in Los Angeles to watch the final edit. Osbourne was unhappy with the laser show and stormed out of the room. Bassist Rudy Sarzo later observed him in the parking lot, drunkenly letting the air out of the producer's tires in protest.

This video was finally released in the US in DVD format on 17 July 2012 from Eagle Rock Entertainment. Following its US release, this DVD has been met with positive responses. William Clark of Guitar International said, "Everything from the stage sets, to the action on stage and the powerful Ozzy persona make this live performance, in a word, fantastic".

== Personnel ==
=== Band members ===
- Ozzy Osbourne - vocals, harmonica on "The Wizard"
- Brad Gillis - guitar
- Rudy Sarzo - bass
- Tommy Aldridge - drums
- Don Airey - keyboards

=== Production ===
- Max Norman - producer, engineer, mixing at Record Plant Studios, New York
- Chuck Weisner - live sound
- Tim Young - mastering

== Charts ==
=== Album ===
Chart (1982–1983)	Peak position
Canada Top Albums/CDs (RPM)	10
UK Albums (Official Charts)	21
US Billboard 200	14

=== Singles ===
Year	Single	Chart	Position
1983	"Paranoid"	Mainstream Rock (USA)	25
1983	"Iron Man"/"Children of the Grave"	Mainstream Rock (USA)	32
1983	"Symptom of the Universe"	UK Singles Chart	100

== Certifications ==
Region	Certification	Certified units/sales
Canada (Music Canada)	Gold	50,000^{^}
United Kingdom (BPI)	Silver	60,000^{^}
United States (RIAA)	Platinum	1,000,000^{^}
^{^} Shipments figures based on certification alone.
