= Scream (Ozzy Osbourne album) =

Studio album by Ozzy Osbourne
- Released: 11 June 2010 (details)
- Recorded: 2010
- Studios: The Bunker, Los Angeles, California
- Genre: Heavy metal
- Length: 49:00
- Label: Epic
- Producers: Ozzy Osbourne; Kevin Churko

Ozzy Osbourne chronology
Black Rain (2007)	Scream (2010)	Ozzy Live (2012)

Singles from Scream
- 1. "Let Me Hear You Scream" Released: 3 May 2010; 2. "Life Won't Wait" Released: 8 August 2010; 3. "Let it Die" Released: 23 January 2011

Professional ratings
Aggregate scores
Source	Rating
Metacritic	63/100
Review scores
Source	Rating
AllMusic	3.5/5 stars
Billboard	4/5 stars
The Daily Telegraph	3/5 stars
Dotmusic	7/10
Entertainment Weekly	B
IGN	7.7/10
Kerrang!	4/5 stars
PopMatters	5/10
Rolling Stone	3/5 stars
Uncut	6/10

Scream is the eleventh studio album by the English heavy metal singer Ozzy Osbourne, released in the United Kingdom on 14 June 2010. The album was recorded at Osbourne's home studio "The Bunker" in Los Angeles, California and produced by himself and Kevin Churko, who had previously worked on Black Rain in 2007. The album was considered commercially disappointing in comparison to Osbourne's earlier work, though it was a moderate success by reaching 4 on the U.S. Billboard 200 chart and number 12 on the UK Albums Chart.

The album was originally to have been titled Soul Sucka, but this was changed before release to Scream after fans voiced their objections. It is Osbourne's only album to feature guitarist Gus G, who replaced long-term guitarist Zakk Wylde. The drums on the album were recorded by Kevin Churko, though Tommy Clufetos was credited, as he was touring with Osbourne's band at the time. Scream is also the first release to feature keyboardist Adam Wakeman, who had worked with Osbourne as a touring musician since 2004. The lead single released from the album was "Let Me Hear You Scream", which peaked at number 6 on the American Rock Songs chart. It is Osbourne's first album since 1986's The Ultimate Sin to use his classic logo on the cover art.

A 2-CD, "Tour Edition" version of the album was released in the U.S. on 5 October 2010. This package contains the original album on disc 1 and a second CD with seven bonus songs: "One More Time" (originally an iTunes pre-order exclusive), "Jump the Moon" (originally a bonus track on the Japanese release), and "Hand of the Enemy" (previously unreleased) from the Scream sessions, and four additional live tracks recorded during the UK leg of the Scream tour: "Bark at the Moon", "Let Me Hear You Scream", "No More Tears" and a live recording of Black Sabbath's "Fairies Wear Boots". A four-sided vinyl edition, containing the aforementioned studio tracks along with the live version of "Let Me Hear You Scream" and the single version of "Life Won't Wait", is also available.

Scream was also Osbourne's last album for a decade until the release of Ordinary Man in 2020.

== Background ==
To promote the album, an Ozzy Osbourne track pack had been released as downloadable content for the Rock Band video game series, containing three Scream songs and three of Ozzy's greatest hits. "Let Me Hear You Scream", "Soul Sucker" and "Diggin' Me Down" were released on 15 June 2010, alongside three songs from Osbourne's earlier albums: "I Don't Wanna Stop" (from Black Rain), "Crazy Babies" (from No Rest for the Wicked) and "No More Tears" (from the album of the same title).

Another promotional event occurred at Dodger Stadium in Los Angeles on 12 June 2010. In the middle of the fifth inning of a game between the Los Angeles Dodgers and Los Angeles Angels, Osbourne encouraged the crowd to scream the title of the album as loud and as long as possible. The goal was to set the Guinness World Record for the loudest and longest scream by a crowd; the attempt succeeded. Although the official decibel level has not been announced, the stadium beat the previous record set by a group of Finnish Boy Scouts, which was 127.2 dBA. The money earned was donated to ThinkCure! to aid cancer research. Osbourne also appeared on many new commercials, video games, albums, etc. to promote the album.

"Let Me Hear You Scream" hit number 1 on the US Mainstream Rock Tracks chart, which is Osbourne's second single to achieve such a feat. The song was featured along with "Crazy Train" in the video game Madden NFL 11.

"Life Won't Wait" reached No. 1 on the Mediabase rock chart in Canada, making it his third single to achieve such a feat. "Life Won't Wait" was announced in the Production Notes, and played during the end credits for the horror film Saw 3D.

CBS had also promoted the song "Let Me Hear You Scream" in their television show CSI: NY and it was also featured in the 6th-season episode "Redemption".

== Track listing ==
Standard Edition
No.	Title	Writer(s)	Length
1.	"Let It Die"	Ozzy Osbourne; Kevin Churko; Adam Wakeman	6:06
2.	"Let Me Hear You Scream"	Osbourne; Churko	3:25
3.	"Soul Sucker"	Osbourne; Churko	4:34
4.	"Life Won't Wait"	Osbourne; Churko	5:06
5.	"Diggin' Me Down"	Osbourne; Churko; Wakeman	6:03
6.	"Crucify"	Osbourne; Churko; Kane Churko	3:29
7.	"Fearless"	Osbourne; Churko; Wakeman	3:41
8.	"Time"	Osbourne; Churko	5:31
9.	"I Want It More"	Osbourne; Churko; Wakeman	5:36
10.	"Latimer's Mercy"	Osbourne; Churko	4:27
11.	"I Love You All"	Osbourne; Churko; Wakeman	1:02
Total length:			49:00

iTunes pre-order bonus track
No.	Title	Writer(s)	Length
12.	"One More Time"	Osbourne; Churko	3:07

Japanese edition bonus track
No.	Title	Writer(s)	Length
12.	"Jump the Moon"	Osbourne; Churko	3:07

Tour Edition - Disc 2
No.	Title	Writer(s)	Length
1.	"Hand of the Enemy" (previously unreleased track from the Scream sessions)	Osbourne; Churko; Wakeman	3:41
2.	"One More Time"	Osbourne; Churko	3:07
3.	"Jump the Moon"	Osbourne; Churko	2:54
4.	"Bark at the Moon" (live)	Osbourne	4:29
5.	"Let Me Hear You Scream" (live)	Osbourne; Churko	3:25
6.	"No More Tears" (live)	Osbourne; Zakk Wylde; Mike Inez; Randy Castillo; John Purdell	7:18
7.	"Fairies Wear Boots" (live)	Osbourne; Tony Iommi; Geezer Butler; Bill Ward	6:35

No.	Title	Length
1.	"Let Me Hear You Scream" (video)
2.	"The making of the "Let Me Hear You Scream" (video)
3.	"The making of the album Scream"

== Personnel ==
Musicians

- Ozzy Osbourne – vocals, production
- Gus G – guitars
- Rob "Blasko" Nicholson – bass
- Adam Wakeman – keyboards
- Tommy Clufetos – drums (did not play on album, credit only)
- Kevin Churko – drums, percussion, production, engineering, mixing

Additional personnel

- Kane Churko – Pro Tools engineering
- Bob Ludwig – mastering
- Meghan Foley – art direction, graphic design
- Jennifer Tzar – art direction, photography
- Josh Cheuse, Jeff Gilligan – graphic design

== Charts ==
=== Weekly charts ===
Chart (2010)	Peak position
Australian Albums (ARIA)	11
Austrian Albums (Ö3 Austria)	9
Belgian Albums (Ultratop Flanders)	79
Belgian Albums (Ultratop Wallonia)	49
Canadian Albums (Billboard)	4
Danish Albums (Hitlisten)	18
Dutch Albums (Album Top 100)	57
European Albums Chart	9
Finnish Albums (Suomen virallinen lista)	3
French Albums (SNEP)	49
German Albums (Offizielle Top 100)	7
Greek Albums (IFPI)	1
Hungarian Albums (MAHASZ)	10
Irish Albums (IRMA)	64
Italian Albums (FIMI)	29
Japanese Albums (Oricon)	11
Mexican Albums (AMPROFON)	60
New Zealand Albums (RMNZ)	6
Norwegian Albums (VG-lista)	9
Polish Albums (OLiS)	3
Scottish Albums (Official Charts)	19
Spanish Albums (Promusicae)	74
Swedish Albums (Sverigetopplistan)	3
Swiss Albums (Schweizer Hitparade)	8
UK Albums (Official Charts)	12
US Billboard 200	4
US Top Hard Rock Albums (Billboard)	4
US Top Rock Albums (Billboard)	1

=== Year-end charts ===
Chart (2010)	Position
Swedish Albums (Sverigetopplistan)	92
US Billboard 200	154
US Top Rock Albums (Billboard)	40

== Certifications ==
Region	Certification	Certified units/sales
Canada (Music Canada)	Gold	40,000^{^}
Poland (ZPAV)	Gold	10,000^{*}
^{*} Sales figures based on certification alone.^{^} Shipments figures based on certification alone.

== Release history ==
Region	Date
Europe	11 June 2010
United Kingdom	14 June 2010
Australia	18 June 2010
United States	22 June 2010
Japan	23 June 2010
Brazil	24 June 2010
