= Under Cover (Ozzy Osbourne album) =

2005 album by Ozzy Osbourne

Studio album by Ozzy Osbourne
- Released: 1 November 2005
- Recorded: 2003–05
- Studios: Cello Studios; Whatinthwhatthe?; The Music Machine; The Village Recorder; Capitol Studios, Los Angeles; Sony Music Studios; Avatar Studios, New York City; Ritz Carlton Hotel, Palm Beach; Peninsula Hotel, New York; Abbey Road Studios; Withfield Street Studios, London, UK
- Genre: Rock
- Length: 57:10
- Label: Epic
- Producer: Mark Hudson

Ozzy Osbourne chronology
Prince of Darkness (2005)	Under Cover (2005)	Black Rain (2007)

Professional ratings
Review scores
Source	Rating
AllMusic	3/5 stars
Entertainment Weekly	B−
Ultimate Guitar	7.7/10

Under Cover is the ninth studio album by the English heavy metal singer Ozzy Osbourne. The album consists entirely of cover songs, with an emphasis on rock music from the 1960s and 1970s. This is Osbourne's first and only album to feature cover songs from various artists, although in 1982, Osbourne released the live album Speak of the Devil featuring renditions of songs from his time with Black Sabbath. All but four songs were originally released in the box set Prince of Darkness, released earlier the same year. The additional songs are "Rocky Mountain Way", "Sunshine of Your Love", "Woman" and "Go Now". Whilst he cites The Beatles as his favourite band, his favourite song of all time is Procol Harum's "A Whiter Shade of Pale". He had wished to cover this song but was advised against it since it had recently been covered by a "close musical associate" (then-former guitarist Zakk Wylde covered the song with his band Black Label Society on their 2004 album Hangover Music Vol. VI).

Under Cover is the only Osbourne album to feature the work of Alice in Chains' guitarist Jerry Cantrell or bassist Chris Wyse.

The album is also available in DualDisc format. This version contains the bonus track "Changes" (originally by Black Sabbath), performed by Osbourne and his daughter Kelly Osbourne. The DVD side contains all the songs in enhanced stereo, a documentary entitled Dinner with Ozzy and Friends, and a video for the song "In My Life".

"Mississippi Queen" was released as a promo single and peaked at number 10 on the Hot Mainstream Rock Tracks.

== Track listing ==
No.	Title	Writer(s)	Original artist	Length
1.	"Rocky Mountain Way"	Rocke Grace; Kenny Passarelli; Joe Vitale; Joe Walsh	Joe Walsh	4:32
2.	"In My Life"	John Lennon; Paul McCartney	The Beatles	3:30
3.	"Mississippi Queen"	Corky Laing; Felix Pappalardi; David Rea; Leslie West	Mountain	4:11
4.	"Go Now"	Larry Banks; Milton Bennett	Bessie Banks	3:42
5.	"Woman"	Lennon	John Lennon	3:45
6.	"21st Century Schizoid Man"	Robert Fripp; Michael Giles; Greg Lake; Ian McDonald; Peter Sinfield	King Crimson	3:53
7.	"All the Young Dudes"	David Bowie	Mott the Hoople	4:34
8.	"For What It's Worth"	Stephen Stills	Buffalo Springfield	3:20
9.	"Good Times"	Vic Briggs; Eric Burdon; Barry Jenkins; Danny McCulloch; John Weider	The Animals	3:45
10.	"Sunshine of Your Love"	Pete Brown; Jack Bruce; Eric Clapton	Cream	5:10
11.	"Fire"	Arthur Brown; Vincent Crane; Mike Finesilver; Peter Ker	Arthur Brown	4:08
12.	"Working Class Hero"	Lennon	John Lennon	3:22
13.	"Sympathy for the Devil"	Mick Jagger; Keith Richards	The Rolling Stones	7:11

DualDisc Edition Bonus Track
No.	Title	Writer(s)	Original artist	Length
14.	"Changes" (featuring Kelly Osbourne)	Ozzy Osbourne; Tony Iommi; Geezer Butler; Bill Ward	Black Sabbath	4:07

== Personnel ==
- Ozzy Osbourne – vocals
- Jerry Cantrell – guitars
- Chris Wyse – bass
- Mike Bordin – drums

Guest musicians

- Ian Hunter – vocals on "All the Young Dudes"
- Leslie West – guitar solo on "Mississippi Queen"
- Robert Randolph – pedal steel on "Sympathy for the Devil", guitar solo on "21st Century Schizoid Man"
- Kelly Osbourne – vocals on "Changes"
- Chris Goerce – guitar on "Changes"
- Marc Russell – bass on "Changes"
- Mike "Beans" Benigno – drums on "Changes"
- Paul Santo – guitar solo on "Sunshine of Your Love"

Additional musicians

- Gregg Bissonette, Joe Bonamassa, Bogie Bowles, Tabby Callaghan, Louis Conte, Jim Cox, Madison Derek, Steve Dudas, Molly Foote, Mark Hudson, Sarah Hudson, Michael Landau, James Mastro, Paul Santo, Bruce Sugar

Production

- Produced by Mark Hudson
- Arrangements by Steve Dudas
- Engineered and mixed by Bruce Sugar
- Additional engineering – Kevin Churko and David Frangioni
- Assistant engineers – Jimmy Hoyson, Ghian Wright, Peter Doris, Charlie Paakkari, Jason Agel, Geoff Rice, Andy Brohard, Devin Workman, Alex Scannell
- Mastered by George Marino
- Art direction – David Coleman
- Cover photo – Kevin Westenberg
- Tray photo – Dennis Keeley
- Back cover photo – Myriam Santos-Kayda
- Interior photos – Myriam Santos-Kayda, Sam Taylor Wood, Bil Zelman

== Charts ==
Chart (2005)	Peak position
Scottish Albums (Official Charts)	72
Swedish Albums (Sverigetopplistan)	50
Swiss Albums (Schweizer Hitparade)	95
UK Albums (Official Charts)	67
US Billboard 200	134
