= Over the Mountain =

Single by Ozzy Osbourne

from the album Diary of a Madman
- B-side: "I Don't Know (Live)"
- Released: 4 December 1981
- Recorded: 1981
- Genre: Heavy metal
- Length: 4:31
- Label: Jet; Epic
- Songwriters: Ozzy Osbourne; Randy Rhoads; Bob Daisley; Lee Kerslake
- Producer: Max Norman

Ozzy Osbourne singles chronology
| "Flying High Again" (1981) | "Over the Mountain" (1981) | "Tonight" (1982) |

"Over the Mountain" is the opening track of heavy metal musician Ozzy Osbourne's second studio album Diary of a Madman. The song debuted at number 42 on the Billboard Top Tracks chart and reached number 38. The song was written by Osbourne, Bob Daisley, Lee Kerslake and Randy Rhoads. The song was later included on the Ozzy Osbourne compilation albums, The Ozzman Cometh on 11 November 1997, The Essential Ozzy Osbourne on 11 February 2003 and Prince of Darkness on 22 March 2005.

== Personnel ==
- Ozzy Osbourne - vocals
- Randy Rhoads - guitar
- Bob Daisley - bass
- Lee Kerslake - drums

Songwriting

- Osbourne, Rhoads, Daisley and Kerslake

== Charts ==
| Chart (1982) | Peak position |
|---|---|
| Billboard Top Tracks | 38 |

== Cover versions ==
- The song was covered by Fozzy with Butch Walker on vocals and guitar on their debut album, Fozzy, on 24 October 2000. In his review of the album, Steve Huey of AllMusic felt the cover had a "...tendency to go a little too far over the top..."
- The song was covered on Stryper's album The Covering on 15 February 2011. In his review of the album, Mark Allen of Hardrock Haven felt the cover version was a misstep and that "there are far better Ozzy offerings than "Over the Mountain."" But Morgan Y. Evans of MetalRiot thought the cover version was "...well suited to the signature soaring Stryper vocals you love or hate)."
- The song was covered by The Word Alive for the compilation album Punk Goes X on 25 January 2011 and then later included on their deluxe edition of Deceiver on 7 June 2011. In his review of the album, Matthew Kurtiz of Metal Delirium liked "the screams behind the main vocals."
- The song was covered by Epidemic as a secret track on their 1994 album Exit Paradise.
- A cover of the song was released by Two Minutes to Late Night on their YouTube channel on October 12, 2020. The cover was the 25th in their "bedroom cover" series. The cover featured artists: Mike Schleibaum (Darkest Hour), Brann Dailor (Mastodon), Marvin Nygaard (Kvelertak), Sebastian Thomson (Baroness), and Jordan Olds in his Gwarsenio Hall persona.
