= Bark at the Moon =

Studio album by Ozzy Osbourne
- Released: 14 November 1983
- Recorded: 1983
- Studios: Ridge Farm Studio (Rusper, England)
- Genres: Heavy metal; glam metal; pop metal
- Length: 39:31
- Labels: CBS Associated (US); Epic (UK)
- Producers: Ozzy Osbourne; Bob Daisley; Max Norman

Ozzy Osbourne chronology
Speak of the Devil (1982)	Bark at the Moon (1983)	The Ultimate Sin (1986)

Alternative cover
- In European markets, the album's embedded logo was given an outline of blue to match the album's colour.

Singles from Bark at the Moon
- 1. "Bark at the Moon" Released: 11 November 1983; 2. "So Tired" Released: 21 May 1984

Professional ratings
Review scores
Source	Rating
AllMusic	3/5 stars
Martin Popoff	10/10

Bark at the Moon is the third studio album by the English heavy metal singer Ozzy Osbourne, released in 14 November 1983 in the US and on 2 December 1983 in the UK.

A commercial success, Bark at the Moon peaked at number 19 on the Billboard album chart and within several weeks of release was certified gold for over 500,000 sales in the United States. By 2000, it had sold over 3,000,000 copies in the United States. In the UK, it was the third of four Osbourne albums to attain silver certification (60,000 units sold) by the British Phonographic Industry, achieving this in January 1984. The album was remastered on CD in 1995 and again (with a different mix) in 2002. This is Osbourne's first album to feature guitarist Jake E. Lee and only studio album to feature drummer Tommy Aldridge.

== Overview ==
Bark at the Moon is the only Ozzy Osbourne album on which the songwriting is credited entirely to Osbourne. However, guitarist Jake E. Lee maintains that he composed a significant amount of the album's music but was cheated out of his writing and publishing claims by Osbourne's wife and manager, Sharon. Lee claims that after he had composed the songs and completed recording his parts in the studio, he was presented with a contract which stated that he would have no claim to any writing or publishing relating to the album. The contract also stated that Lee could not mention this publicly. Lee claims he signed the contract because he had no legal representation and because Sharon threatened to fire him and have another guitarist re-record his parts if he refused.

Osbourne himself admitted several years later in the liner notes to The Ozzman Cometh that Lee had been involved in the album's writing to at least some degree, stating that the album's title track was in fact co-written by the guitarist. Osbourne's bassist at the time, Bob Daisley, has mirrored Lee's account of the album's production, stating that he co-wrote most of the music with Lee and wrote the vast majority of the lyrics. Daisley has stated that he accepted a buyout from Osbourne in exchange for a writing credit. Osbourne's former drummer Lee Kerslake, who also played with Daisley in Uriah Heep after leaving Osbourne's band, stated that Daisley had been hired by Sharon Osbourne to write the Bark at the Moon album for "$50–60,000 or whatever it is. He was offered the chance to write with Ozzy. Words, music – write the album."

Some European pressings identified the track "Centre of Eternity" as "Forever". On various tour dates for the album, Osbourne referred to the song as both "Forever" as well as "Journey to the Center of Eternity". The former can be heard on some bootleg recordings of shows promoting the album, and the latter can be heard on recordings of the concert (also recorded on video) from Salt Lake City, Utah. The title track was released as the album's first single with an accompanying music video, the first Osbourne had made. In the early 1980s infancy of the music video medium, the video was highly anticipated due to his outrageous image. The decision to release the ballad "So Tired" as the album's second single was unpopular with many longtime fans. The track "Spiders in the Night" was originally included only on the European, Australian, New Zealand and Greek releases, but was included on the 1995 CD reissue and the 2002 reissue, listed simply as "Spiders."

Composed by Daisley, the lyrics to the song "Now You See It (Now You Don't)" were a pointed rebuke aimed at Osbourne's wife and manager Sharon, who had fired him from the band in 1981. Daisley stated many years later that he was surprised the Osbourne camp allowed the lyrics on the album.

Shortly after Bark at the Moon's 1983 release, a Canadian man named James Jollimore murdered a woman and her two children after allegedly listening to the album. The media and Christian groups began to infer that the music was Satanic and had influenced Jollimore to commit the act. The timing was particularly inopportune for Osbourne, who was, at the time, facing allegations that his song "Suicide Solution" had influenced a fan to commit suicide.

Bark at the Moon is Osbourne's third solo album after parting ways with Black Sabbath in 1979 and his only studio album to feature drummer Tommy Aldridge, who was a fixture of his live band in the early 1980s. Aldridge departed after the recording of the album and was briefly replaced by Carmine Appice, but returned mid-tour after Appice was removed by the Osbournes. When asked why Aldridge was brought back, Osbourne told Hit Parader magazine in early 1984 "For health reasons. He [Appice] was making me sick." Nonetheless, Appice did appear in the popular music video for the "Bark at the Moon" single.

=== 2002 remixed edition ===
Bark at the Moon was re-issued again in 2002, although this release featured alternate mixes of many of the songs.

== Track listing ==
All songs written by Ozzy Osbourne.^{[†]}

=== US edition ===
Side one
No.	Title	Length
1.	"Bark at the Moon"	4:16
2.	"You're No Different"	5:49
3.	"Now You See It (Now You Don't)"	5:10
4.	"Rock 'n' Roll Rebel"	5:23

Side two
No.	Title	Length
1.	"Centre of Eternity"	5:15
2.	"So Tired"	4:02
3.	"Slow Down"	4:20
4.	"Waiting for Darkness"	5:16
Total length:		39:31

=== European edition ===
Side one
No.	Title	Length
1.	"Rock 'n' Roll Rebel"	5:23
2.	"Bark at the Moon"	4:16
3.	"You're No Different"	5:49
4.	"Now You See It (Now You Don't)"	5:10

Side two
No.	Title	Length
1.	"Forever"	5:23
2.	"So Tired"	4:02
3.	"Waiting for Darkness"	5:16
4.	"Spiders"	4:31
Total length:		39:50

Japanese edition and 1995 reissue bonus track
No.	Title	Length
9.	"Spiders in the Night"	4:31

2002 reissue bonus tracks
No.	Title	Length
9.	"Spiders"	4:31
10.	"One Up the 'B' Side"	3:23
Total length:		47:25

† All writing was officially credited to Osbourne. However, Jake E. Lee has claimed that he and Bob Daisley wrote material for the album but were cheated out of writing credits by Ozzy's manager/wife, Sharon Osbourne. Ozzy later admitted that they were involved in the songwriting "to some extent" but stated they were co-written with him. In a Guitar World interview from 1986 Jake was asked how much input did he have on “Bark At The Moon”. Jake stated that “Most of the music was mine. “Rock N’ Roll Rebel”, “Bark At The Moon”, “Now You See It, (Now You Don’t)”, “Waiting For Darkness” and “Slow Down” were mine.”

== Personnel ==
- Ozzy Osbourne – vocals
- Jake E. Lee – guitar, backing vocals
- Bob Daisley – bass, backing vocals
- Tommy Aldridge – drums
- Don Airey – keyboards

Production

- Produced by Ozzy Osbourne, Bob Daisley and Max Norman
- Engineered by Max Norman
- String arrangements by Louis Clark
- Mixed by Tony Bongiovi at The Power Station, New York City (except "Slow Down" and "Waiting for Darkness", mixed by Malcolm Pollack at The Power Station)
- Remastered by Brian Lee with Bob Ludwig (1995 reissue)

== Charts ==
Chart (1983–1984)	Peak position
Australian Albums (Kent Music Report)	94
Canada Top Albums/CDs (RPM)	23
Finnish Albums (The Official Finnish Charts)	20
Swedish Albums (Sverigetopplistan)	9
UK Albums (Official Charts)	24
US Billboard 200	19

Chart (1986)	Peak position
New Zealand Albums (RMNZ)	50

Chart (2023–2025)	Peak position
Hungarian Physical Albums (MAHASZ)	38
Polish Albums (ZPAV)	94
UK Rock & Metal Albums (Official Charts)	18

== Certifications ==
Region	Certification	Certified units/sales
Australia (ARIA)	Gold	35,000^{‡}
Canada (Music Canada)	Platinum	100,000^{^}
United Kingdom (BPI)	Silver	60,000^{^}
United States (RIAA)	3× Platinum	3,000,000^{^}
^{^} Shipments figures based on certification alone.^{‡} Sales+streaming figures based on certification alone.

== Accolades ==
Publication	Country	Accolade	Rank
L.A. Weekly	US	Chuck Klosterman's Favorite Hair Metal Albums	21
