= Flying High Again =

Single by Ozzy Osbourne

from the album Diary of a Madman
- B-side: "I Don't Know" (Live)
- Released: 16 October 1981
- Genre: Heavy metal
- Length: 4:44
- Label: Jet; Epic
- Songwriters: Ozzy Osbourne; Randy Rhoads; Bob Daisley; Lee Kerslake
- Producer: Max Norman

Ozzy Osbourne singles chronology
"Mr. Crowley" (1980)	"Flying High Again" (1981)	"Over the Mountain" (1982)

Music video
- "Flying High Again" on YouTube

"Flying High Again" is a song performed by English heavy metal musician Ozzy Osbourne, who additionally was one of its songwriters. It came out in 1981 as a part of his second album as a solo artist, which Osbourne titled Diary of a Madman.

The track is in the key of A♭ major and has a related vocal range of E♭3 to D♭5. Released as a single, "Flying High Again" achieved commercial success and eventually reached the number two spot on the Billboard publication's Top Tracks chart for rock music and related styles in 1982.

The track is known for musical elements such as its aggressive guitar solo, performed by musician Randy Rhoads, and for dramatic lyrics such as "[s]wallowing colors from the sounds I hear" and "[a]m I just a crazy guy" sung by Osbourne in his heavy metal style. Critical praise has come from various publications such as Allmusic and Loudwire within the American media industry, with the latter news magazine lauding Obsourne's release of "storming fist-in-the-air rockers" including not just "Flying High Again" but "Over the Mountain" and "S.A.T.O." as well.

== Background and legacy ==
While the song has been assumed by fans and others to be about recreational drug use and other forms of hedonistic behavior, especially given dramatic lyrics such as "[s]wallowing colors from the sounds I hear" and "[a]m I just a crazy guy", Osbourne later stated that "Flying High Again" was inspired by his successful re-emergence as a solo artist. This occurred after being fired from the British heavy metal group Black Sabbath in a highly public fashion, which allegedly caused him to believe that his career had ended. The line "mama's getting worried" was taken from Osbourne's makeup artist Rachel Youngblood, who used to say that phrase when bringing him drinks backstage. Drummer Lee Kerslake created the vocal melody.

In terms of music criticism, Gina Boldman of AllMusic has praised the song in general and particularly guitarist Randy Rhoads' work in it (while she labeled Osbourne's vocal work as conveying "sloppy conviction"). She regarded "Flying High Again" a release that became "a good-time heavy metal song that was hard to take seriously" and retrospectively wound up being "one of Ozzy's most likable and memorable songs of his early-'80s period." She additionally remarked that Rhoads' guitar solo in the track was one of his best performances, describing the musician's approach as being "expertly executed with a concise, melodic build that never gets shrill or overblown."

A retrospective article released by Loudwire in November 2023 lauded both the song and parent album Diary of a Madman, with music journalist Jon Wiederhorn remarking that "Osbourne [had] skillfully" devised "storming fist-in-the-air rockers" including not just "Flying High Again" but "Over the Mountain" and "S.A.T.O." as well. Wiederhorn stated in addition that Rhoads had "shined bright as the sun all over the record" when it came to the tracklist as a whole. The journalist additionally noted that, "[t]ragically", Diary of a Madman wound up being the last studio album to feature Rhoads after the musician's death on 19 March 1982, although multiple singles including "Flying High Again" relying on Rhoads' artistry became popular hits. Osbourne himself later remarked in the context of "Flying High Again" and other tracks on the studio release that "Randy was the highlight of that album and everything he did" since that musician "could do anything" such that Osbourne felt "very lucky to have him."

In December 2015, the American radio station 100.7 WZLX ranked "Flying High Again" the 223rd greatest song in the history of the 'classic rock' format, with this occurring as a part of the organization's "Classic Rock Countdown". An animated music video was released to YouTube on 5 November 2021 celebrating Rhoads, who had died a year after the single's release. As of 2025, this specific release has acquired over seven million views on the online platform.

== Personnel ==
- Ozzy Osbourne – lead vocals
- Randy Rhoads – guitar
- Bob Daisley – bass
- Lee Kerslake – drums

== See also ==
- 1981 in British music
- Bob Daisley & Ozzy Osbourne controversy
- Heavy metal music
- Ozzy Osbourne discography
- Randy Rhoads discography
