= Bark at the Moon (song) =

1983 single by Ozzy Osbourne

Single by Ozzy Osbourne

from the album Bark at the Moon
- B-side: "One Up the "B" Side"
- Released: 11 November 1983
- Recorded: 1983
- Genre: Heavy metal
- Length: 4:17
- Label: Jet
- Songwriter: Ozzy Osbourne
- Producer: Max Norman

Ozzy Osbourne singles chronology
"Iron Man/Children of the Grave" (1983)	"Bark at the Moon" (1983)	"So Tired" (1983)

Audio sample
- file; help

"Bark at the Moon" is a song by heavy metal singer Ozzy Osbourne. It was the first single released from his 1983 album of the same name. The music video produced for the song was Osbourne's first. It peaked at number 21 on the UK Singles Chart and number 12 on Billboard's Album Rock Tracks. The song has received critical praise, frequently being voted one of Ozzy's best songs.

== Writing ==
Though officially credited solely to Osbourne, "Bark at the Moon" was co-written with guitarist Jake E. Lee and bassist/lyricist Bob Daisley. Daisley has stated that he accepted a buyout from Osbourne in exchange for all writing credits on the album. Lee, however, claims he was threatened with firing by Osbourne's wife and manager Sharon if he refused to sign a 1983 contract stating that he would relinquish his claims to writing and publishing. In the liner notes to The Ozzman Cometh, Osbourne himself, acknowledged that Lee was involved in the song's writing saying, "I had the vocal line for this [song] and Jake came up with the riff. It was the first song we wrote together".

== Music video ==
This was the first song by Osbourne to have a music video. Lyrically, the song deals with a creature of some sort who once terrorized a town, was killed, and later mysteriously returned to once again wreak havoc upon the villagers. The music video, however, borrows heavily from Robert Louis Stevenson's classic Dr. Jekyll and Mr. Hyde story, depicting Osbourne as a "mad scientist" who ingests a substance in his laboratory which causes him to transform into the werewolf depicted on the Bark at the Moon album cover. Thought to be insane, he is subsequently committed to a mental institution. The make-up effects were done by Greg Cannom, best known for his Academy Award winning work on Francis Ford Coppola's Bram Stoker's Dracula.

It is also very likely Ozzy was a fan of the massively popular The Benny Hill Show which had Benny as Dr. Jekyll and Mister Hyde in an episode of Wondergran in it beginning in almost the exact same way as the "Bark" video.

The music video for the song was partially filmed at the Holloway Sanatorium, outside London. In the early 1980s infancy of the music video medium, the video, which was the first Osbourne had made, was highly anticipated due to his outrageous image. Drummer Tommy Aldridge played on the studio recording of the track, but the video features his replacement in the band, Carmine Appice.

== Personnel ==
Studio Version

- Jake E Lee – guitar
- Bob Daisley – bass guitar
- Tommy Aldridge – drums
- Don Airey – keyboard/piano
- Ozzy Osbourne – lead vocals

Music Video Version

- Jake E Lee – guitar
- Bob Daisley – bass guitar
- Carmine Appice – drums
- Don Airey – keyboard/piano
- Ozzy Osbourne – lead vocals

== Charts ==
Chart (1983)	Peak position
UK Singles (Official Charts)	21
US Mainstream Rock (Billboard)	12

== Shadows Fall version ==
The Massachusetts based thrash metal band Shadows Fall covered the song and released it as a single in February 2010. It was also included as a part of the deluxe edition of their 2009 album Retribution. When asked on why the band chose to cover the song, lead singer Brian Fair stated "We kept it close to the original. Obviously I can't sing like Ozzy, but it was cool because I never thought in my life that I would sing about werewolves. That is not usually a subject covered by Shadows Fall, and that was definitely a blast. That song came from us just jamming on tunes, trying to figure out what we want to do. John [Donais] has always been a big Jake E. Lee fan."

The band performed the song on The Daily Habit on February 5, 2010. A music video for the cover was produced by David Brodsky and released in February 2010; it is a recreation of the original Ozzy Osbourne video. In 2020, Loudwire included it on their list of the 10 best covers of Ozzy Osbourne songs.
