= Diary of a Madman (album) =

1981 studio album by Ozzy Osbourne

Studio album by Ozzy Osbourne
- Released: October 1981
- Recorded: 1981
- Studios: Ridge Farm Studio, Rusper, England
- Genre: Heavy metal
- Length: 43:19
- Label: Jet
- Producers: Max Norman; Ozzy Osbourne; Randy Rhoads; Bob Daisley

Ozzy Osbourne chronology
Ozzy Osbourne Live E.P. (1980)	Diary of a Madman (1981)	Speak of the Devil (1982)

Singles from Diary of a Madman
- 1. "Flying High Again" Released: 16 October 1981; 2. "Over the Mountain" Released: 4 December 1981; 3. "Tonight" Released: 1982 (US)

Diary of a Madman is the second studio album by the English heavy metal singer Ozzy Osbourne, released in October 1981. This is the last Osbourne studio album to feature guitarist Randy Rhoads and drummer Lee Kerslake. An altered version appeared in 2002 with the original bass and drum parts removed and re-recorded. In 2011, a Deluxe 30th Anniversary Edition was released with all original parts restored. To date, the album has sold over three million copies worldwide.

Diary of a Madman was supported by the Diary of a Madman Tour, which began on November 5, 1981, and ended August 8, 1982, spanning Europe, North America, and Asia. On March 19, 1982, during the North American leg of the tour, Rhoads died in a plane crash in Leesburg, Florida; after a two-week break, the tour continued with guitarist Bernie Tormé performing several shows in place of Rhoads before in turn being replaced by Brad Gillis.

== Composition and recording ==
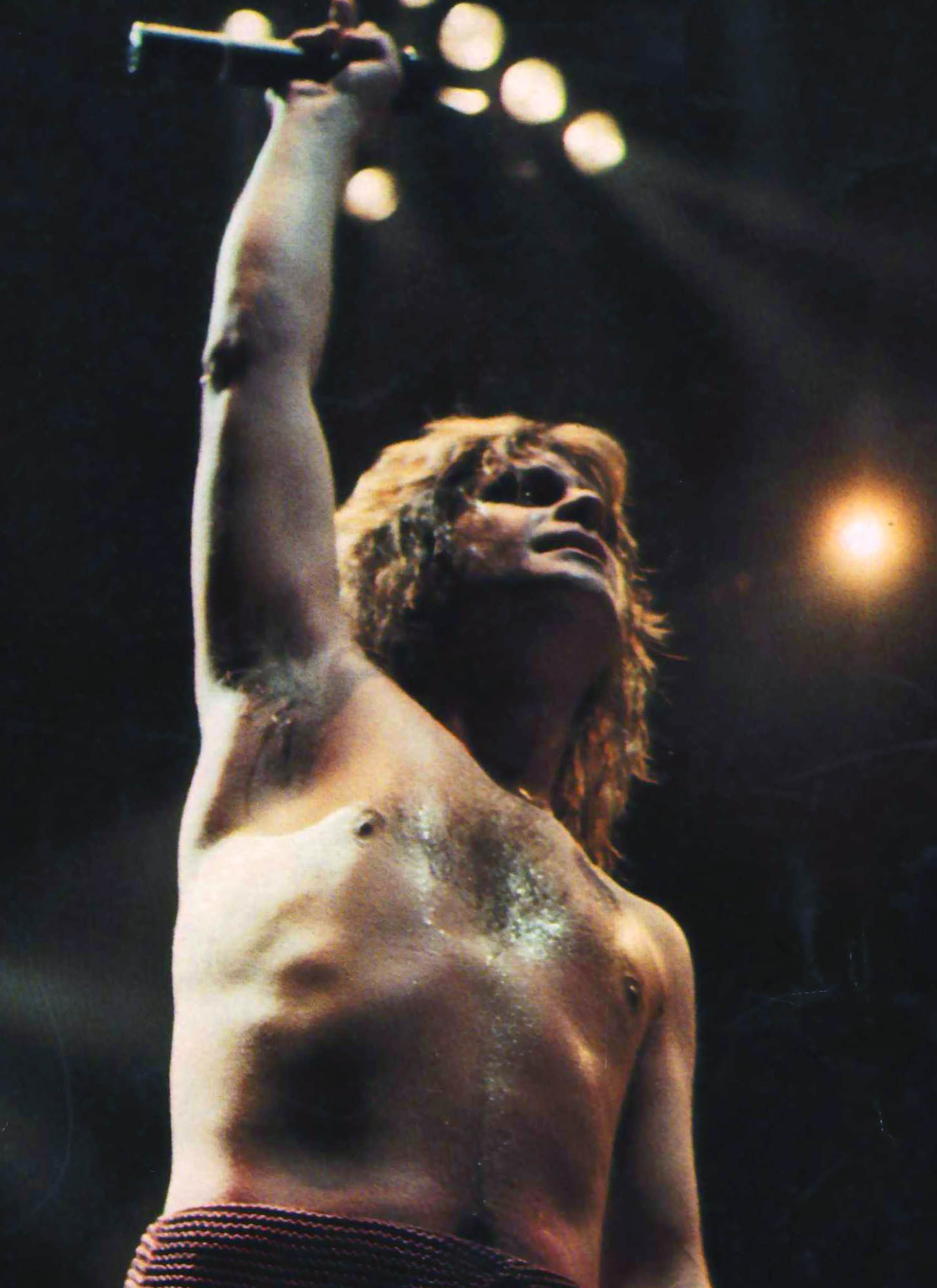
Osbourne performing during the Diary of a Madman tour, 1982

Diary of a Madman is the final album recorded with late guitarist Randy Rhoads. Although bassist Rudy Sarzo and drummer Tommy Aldridge are credited in the liner notes and pictured on the inner sleeve for the vinyl and cassette release and later CD re-issues, it was bassist Bob Daisley and drummer Lee Kerslake who performed all bass and drum parts on the original release. Aldridge has stated of the album, "I think it's pretty obvious that it's not my drumming on that album. I have never taken credit for that recording and have always given Lee Kerslake, whenever asked or interviewed, the credit he rightly deserves."

Daisley provided significant contributions to the album's songwriting, having written some of the music and most of the lyrics. Kerslake claims to have also had a hand in the writing of the album, even performing lead vocals on some of the original demo recordings. "'Flying High Again' was one of my ideas, 'Over the Mountain' was another. The basic (demo) tracks were just Bob's words, my vocals—though some of the words I wrote—and Randy's playing. It was unreal. And then we got Don Airey to come in and do the keyboards", he stated in 2009. Kerslake says he used a piano in the studio to write many of the songs with guitarist Randy Rhoads. Daisley and Kerslake were not given credit for their performance or songwriting contributions, a situation which resulted in a later lawsuit.

During the album's recording, Kerslake says the band members were given no money to live on, prompting them to approach management. Shortly after, both Kerslake and Daisley were fired. "Everything was working fine," said Kerslake. "It was only when Sharon [Osbourne] came in that we had a problem. When she started managing—taking over—she wasn't the manager until Diary of a Madman. Before that was her brother, David [Arden]. He didn't really want to handle it. He had too much to do for Don [Arden] in the office. So she came in and it started to get edgy. But we never suspected a thing until we went away on holiday. Next minute, they're rehearsing with Tommy Aldridge and Rudy Sarzo, and going to America."

Although Don Airey is credited as keyboardist on the album, it was in fact a musician named Johnny Cook (who had worked with Daisley in Mungo Jerry in the 1970s) who actually recorded the keyboard parts. Airey was on tour as a member of Rainbow at the time of recording and was thus unavailable.

Osbourne revealed that while recording "S.A.T.O.", he was lazy and "probably just wanted to go back to the Plough, the cosy old English pub at the corner", recording some takes where he did not realize he was singing "a bit behind the riff" before leaving. He came to regret the end result, declaring "I wince every time I hear it" and that it prompted him to always spend as much time in the studio as he could before the producer got satisfied with the vocals.

== Cover art ==
The album's cover art features Osbourne's son Louis to his side, with Osbourne himself posing in theatrical make-up.

== Reception ==
Professional ratings
Review scores
Source	Rating
AllMusic	4.5/5 stars
The Encyclopedia of Popular Music	3/5 stars
MusicHound Rock	3.5/5 stars
Martin Popoff	10/10 stars
Rolling Stone	3/5 stars

Reception of the album has been generally positive. In particular, the neo-classical guitar work of Randy Rhoads has received much praise. Steve Huey of AllMusic stated that "it's not uncommon to find fans who prefer Diary to Blizzard, since it sets an even more mystical, eerie mood, and since Rhoads' playing is progressing to an even higher level". BBC Music referred to the album as "a classic rock record in every way", "lifted out of the ordinary by the legendary rock axe god, Randy Rhoads". Canadian journalist Martin Popoff called Diary of a Madman "a lasting classic that stands as the definitive showcase for Randy Rhoads."

Though the album is regarded quite favorably today, reviews upon its 1981 release were often less than enthusiastic. J. D. Considine of Rolling Stone, for example, opined upon the album's original release that "the songs here are little more than riffs with a vocal line pasted on top" and referred to Rhoads as "a junior-league Eddie Van Halen – bustling with chops but somewhat short on imagination". The magazine, however, would change its tune and later rank the album 15th on its 2017 list of "100 Greatest Metal Albums of All Time".

== Re-issues ==
=== 2002 re-issue controversy ===
The 2002 Diary of a Madman reissue was derided by fans due to the removal of Daisley and Kerslake's original bass and drum tracks. The re-issue featured re-recorded bass and drum tracks contributed by Osbourne's then-bassist and drummer Robert Trujillo and Mike Bordin, respectively. The move was suspected of being retaliatory in nature, as Daisley and Kerslake were engaged in litigation against Osbourne and his wife/manager Sharon, alleging unpaid royalties for their contributions to Diary of a Madman. Their suit was ultimately dismissed in 2003.

Sharon later stated that Ozzy and not herself was responsible for the decision to re-record the parts, stating "because of Daisley and Kerslake's abusive and unjust behavior, Ozzy wanted to remove them from these recordings. We turned a negative into a positive by adding a fresh sound to the original albums." However, Osbourne contradicted this claim in his 2009 autobiography I Am Ozzy, stating that the decision to re-record the original bass and drum parts was strictly Sharon's decision, and that "I didn't have anything to do with that decision." He said his wife "just snapped" and had it done without his knowledge. He also stated that "a sticker was put on the covers telling everyone about it", though in fact the sticker was not initially placed on the re-issue and was only placed on the covers at a later date due to fan outcry over the altered recordings.

=== Deluxe 30th Anniversary Edition ===
In May 2011, Sony Legacy released its Deluxe 30th Anniversary Editions of Diary of a Madman and Blizzard of Ozz with the original bass and drum tracks. These releases also featured bonus tracks and previously unreleased live material featuring guitarist Rhoads – Diary of a Madman features a second CD entitled Ozzy Live, featuring previously unreleased concert performances from the Blizzard of Ozz 1981 US tour. A box set was also released which included the remastered editions of both albums on CD as well as vinyl, and a DVD documentary entitled Thirty Years After The Blizzard. Ozzy Live was also separately released as a double 180g vinyl exclusively on Record Store Day 2012.

== Track listing ==
=== Original release ===
All songs by Ozzy Osbourne, Randy Rhoads, Bob Daisley and Lee Kerslake, except where noted.

Side one
No.	Title	Writer(s)	Length
1.	"Over the Mountain"		4:31
2.	"Flying High Again"		4:43
3.	"You Can't Kill Rock and Roll"	Osbourne; Rhoads; Daisley	6:58
4.	"Believer"	Osbourne; Rhoads; Daisley	5:17

Side two
No.	Title	Length
1.	"Little Dolls"	5:39
2.	"Tonight"	5:50
3.	"S.A.T.O."	4:06
4.	"Diary of a Madman"	6:15
Total length:		43:19

2002 Reissue Bonus Track
No.	Title	Writer(s)	Length
9.	"I Don't Know" (live)	Osbourne; Rhoads; Daisley	4:56

=== Deluxe edition (2011) ===
All songs recorded live during the second leg of the Blizzard of Ozz Tour.

2011 'Deluxe 30th Anniversary Edition' disc 2
No.	Title	Writer(s)	Recorded at	Length
1.	"I Don't Know"	Osbourne; Rhoads; Daisley		4:50
2.	"Crazy Train"	Osbourne; Rhoads; Daisley		5:26
3.	"Believer"	Osbourne; Rhoads; Daisley		5:37
4.	"Mr Crowley"	Osbourne; Rhoads; Daisley		6:32
5.	"Flying High Again"	Osbourne; Rhoads; Daisley; Kerslake	St. Denis Theatre, Montreal, Quebec, 28 July 1981	4:17
6.	"Revelation (Mother Earth)"	Osbourne; Rhoads; Daisley		5:58
7.	"Steal Away (The Night)"	Osbourne; Rhoads; Daisley		8:00
8.	"Suicide Solution"	Osbourne; Rhoads; Daisley	Palladium, New York City, New York, 2 May 1981	7:30
9.	"Iron Man"	Osbourne; Tony Iommi; Geezer Butler; Bill Ward		4:09
10.	"Children of the Grave"	Osbourne; Iommi; Butler; Ward		5:42
11.	"Paranoid"	Osbourne; Iommi; Butler; Ward		3:23

=== Ozzy Live 180g vinyl ===
Ozzy Live
- Record Store Day exclusive standalone release of Ozzy Live, previously released as disc 2 of the Diary of a Madman Legacy Edition.

Live album by Ozzy Osbourne
- Released: 21 April 2012
- Recorded: 1981
- Genres: Heavy metal, hard rock
- Length: 61:24
- Label: Epic

Ozzy Osbourne chronology
Scream (2010)	Ozzy Live (2012)	Memoirs of a Madman (2014)

Disc 2 of the 2011 Legacy Edition of Diary of a Madman was also released as a limited edition standalone double-180g vinyl entitled Ozzy Live. Sides one, two, and three contained the live material released on the Diary of a Madman Legacy Edition, while side four contained two bonus tracks that had been previously released on the 2011 reissue of Blizzard of Ozz. The vinyl was released exclusively for Record Store Day 2012, and also released as a 7" vinyl reissue of the song "Believer".

Side A
No.	Title	Writer(s)	Length
1.	"I Don't Know"	Osbourne; Rhoads; Daisley	4:50
2.	"Crazy Train"	Osbourne; Rhoads; Daisley	5:26
3.	"Believer"	Osbourne; Rhoads; Daisley	5:37
4.	"Mr. Crowley"	Osbourne; Rhoads; Daisley	6:32

Side B
No.	Title	Writer(s)	Length
5.	"Flying High Again"	Osbourne; Rhoads; Daisley; Kerslake	4:17
6.	"Revelation (Mother Earth)"	Osbourne; Rhoads; Daisley	5:58
7.	"Steal Away (The Night)"	Osbourne; Rhoads; Daisley	8:00

Side C
No.	Title	Writer(s)	Length
8.	"Suicide Solution"	Osbourne; Rhoads; Daisley	7:30
9.	"Iron Man"	Butler; Iommi; Osbourne; Ward	4:09
10.	"Children of the Grave"	Butler; Iommi; Osbourne; Ward	5:42
11.	"Paranoid"	Butler; Iommi; Osbourne; Ward	3:23

Side D
No.	Title	Writer(s)	Length
12.	"Goodbye to Romance" (2010 Guitar & Vocal Mix)	Osbourne; Rhoads; Daisley	5:42
13.	"RR" (Outtake from Blizzard of Ozz sessions)	Rhoads	1:13

== Personnel ==
- Ozzy Osbourne – vocals, production
- Randy Rhoads – guitars, production
- Rudy Sarzo – credited on original release but does not appear; bass on 2011 reissue's live disc
- Tommy Aldridge – credited on original release but does not appear; drums on 2011 reissue's live disc
- Don Airey – credited on original release but does not appear

Additional personnel

- Bob Daisley (uncredited) – bass, production
- Lee Kerslake (uncredited) – drums, percussion
- Johnny Cook – keyboards (uncredited)
- Lindsay Bridgwater – keyboards on 2011 reissue's live disc only
- Louis Clark – string arrangements on "Diary of a Madman"
- Robert Trujillo – bass on 2002 reissue
- Mike Bordin – drums on 2002 reissue

Production

- Max Norman – producer, engineer
- George Marino – mastering
- Brian Lee with Bob Ludwig – remastering (1995 reissue)
- Thom Panunzio – producer (2002 reissue)
- Germán Villacorta – engineer, mixing (2002 reissue)

== Charts ==
Chart (1981–1982)	Peak position
Canada Top Albums/CDs (RPM)	17
UK Albums (Official Charts)	14
US Billboard 200	16

Chart (1986)	Peak position
New Zealand Albums (RMNZ)	42

Chart (2011)	Peak position
UK Rock & Metal Albums (Official Charts)	11

Chart (2021)	Peak position
UK Rock & Metal Albums (Official Charts)	24
US Top Hard Rock Albums (Billboard)	3
US Top Rock Albums (Billboard)	9

== Certifications ==
Region	Certification	Certified units/sales
Canada (Music Canada)	Platinum	100,000^{^}
United Kingdom (BPI)	Silver	60,000^{‡}
United States (RIAA)	3× Platinum	3,000,000^{^}
^{^} Shipments figures based on certification alone.^{‡} Sales+streaming figures based on certification alone.
