= List of highest-grossing benefit concerts =

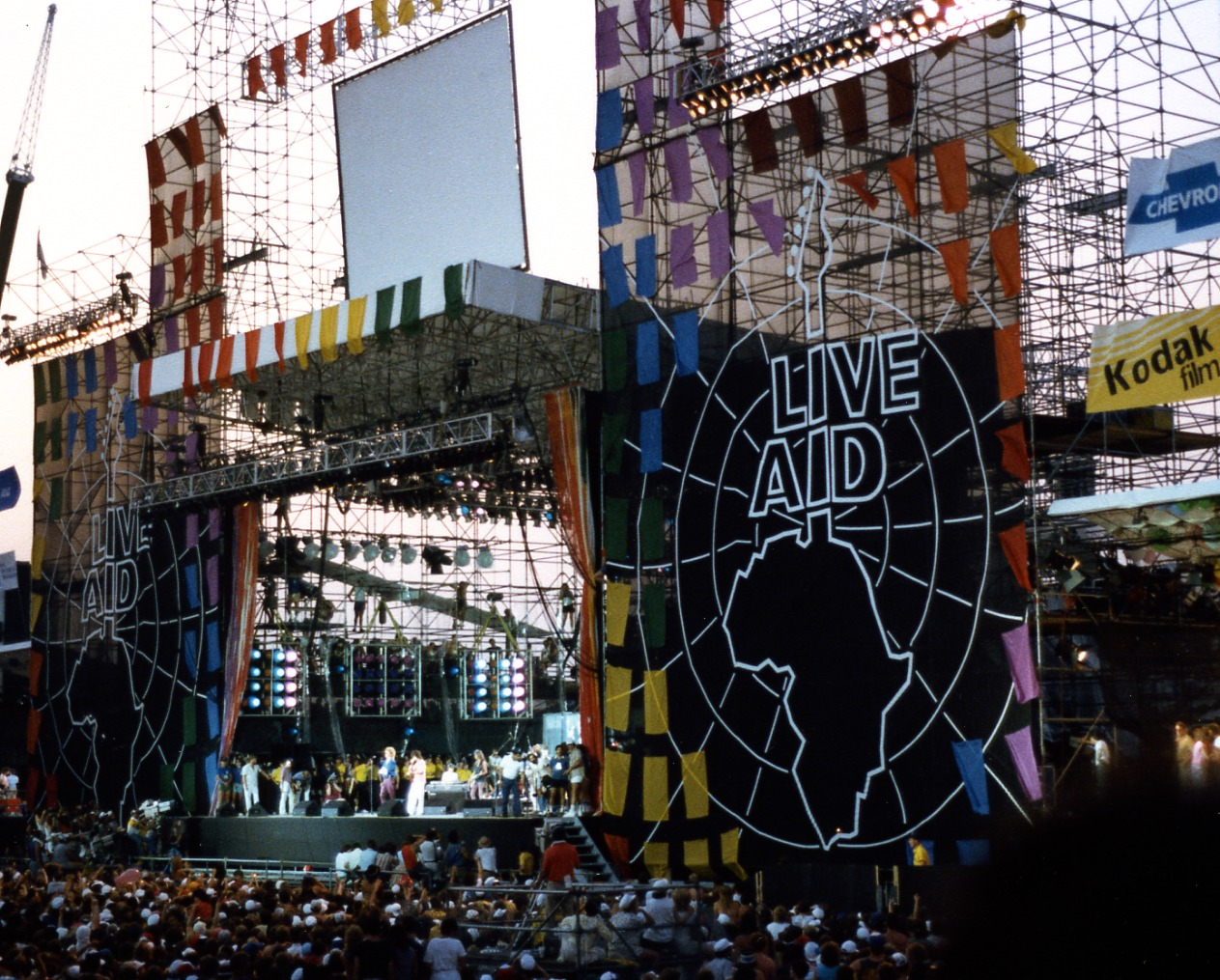
Live Aid is the highest-grossing benefit concert of all time.

The following is a list of benefit concerts that have generated the most gross income. Figures provided are in USD, and are sorted based on inflation-adjusted gross earnings.

They do not reflect later adjustments made due to additional donations received, or production costs incurred. Organizers of The Freddie Mercury Tribute Concert, for instance, declared $35 million had been raised at the conclusion of that event. However, travel accommodation expenses for the event's performers decreased their net charitable contribution significantly.

Malfeasance is also disregarded, such as the charity Yéle Haiti embezzling money raised by Hope for Haiti Now. Funds raised by Live Aid to alleviate the famine in Ethiopia were allegedly distributed to dictator Mengistu Haile Mariam, who instead used them to purchase weaponry.

Live Aid has remained the highest-grossing benefit concert since 1985, when it overtook that title from The Concert for Bangladesh.

== Highest-grossing benefit concerts ==
Top 20 highest-grossing benefit concerts of all time
Rank	Actual gross	Adjusted gross (in 2024 dollars)	Event	Beneficiaries	Year	Attendance	Ref.
1	$100,000,000	$292,357,673	Live Aid	Band Aid Trust	1985	170,000	
2	$150,000,000	$266,369,104	America: A Tribute to Heroes	September 11th Fund	2001	N/A	
3	$190,000,000	$190,000,000	Back to the Beginning	Acorns Children's Hospice; Birmingham Children's; Cure Parkinson's	2025	45,000	
4	$128,000,000	$155,519,095	Together at Home	COVID-19 Solidarity Response Fund	2020	N/A	
5	$100,000,000	$100,000,000	FireAid	Annenberg Foundation	2025		
6	$58,000,000	$83,632,230	Hope for Haiti Now	Clinton Bush Haiti Fund; Oxfam America; Partners In Health; Red Cross; UNICEF; World Food Programme; Yéle Haiti	2010	N/A	
7	$35,000,000	$78,424,235	The Freddie Mercury Tribute Concert	Mercury Phoenix Trust	1992	72,000	
8	$50,000,000	$68,480,939	12-12-12: The Concert for Sandy Relief	Robin Hood Foundation	2012		
9	$40,000,000	$64,399,387	A Concert for Hurricane Relief	American Red Cross	2005	N/A	
10	$45,000,000	$61,632,845	Ahmet Ertegun Tribute Concert	Oxford University	2007	18,000	
11	$30,000,000	$53,273,821	The Concert for New York City	Robin Hood Foundation	2001	14,000	
12	$30,000,000	$48,299,540	Shelter from the Storm: A Concert for the Gulf Coast	American Red Cross; The Salvation Army	2005	N/A	
13	$12,000,000	$35,082,921	The Concert for Bangladesh	UNICEF	1971	40,000	
14	$18,300,000	$29,462,719	Tsunami Aid	American Red Cross	2005	N/A	
15	$29,000,000	$29,000,000	Stand Up for Heroes	Bob Woodruff Foundation	2024	2,700	
16	$7,000,000	$26,312,191	Farm Aid	National Council of Churches	1985	80,000	
17	$12,000,000	$19,319,816	Live 8	Band Aid Trust	2005	1,000,000	
18	$13,000,000	$16,676,215	One Love Manchester	We Love Manchester Emergency Fund	2017	50,000	
19	$5,000,000	$13,293,472	Nelson Mandela 70th Birthday Tribute	Bishop Ambrose Reeves Trust; CAFOD; Christian Aid; IDAF; Oxfam; Save the Children; War on Want	1988	75,000	
20	$7,000,000	$10,223,029	Nelson Mandela 90th Birthday Tribute	Nelson Mandela Foundation	2008	46,664	

== See also ==
- List of highest-grossing concert tours
- List of highest-grossing live music artists
