= Back to the Beginning =

2025 concert by Black Sabbath

- Benefit concert by Black Sabbath
- Promotional poster
- Location: Aston, Birmingham, England
- Venue: Villa Park
- Date: 5 July 2025
- Attendance: 45,000
- Box office: £140 million
- Website: backtothebeginning.com

Black Sabbath concert chronology
- The End Tour (2016–17); Back to the Beginning (2025)

Back to the Beginning was a one-off benefit concert by the English heavy metal band Black Sabbath, with a number of supporting artists. It took place on 5 July 2025 at Villa Park in Aston, Birmingham, England, near to where the band was formed in 1968.

The event concluded with the final live performances of both Black Sabbath and lead singer Ozzy Osbourne as a solo artist; it also marked the first time since 2005 that the original line-up of the band (Osbourne, Tony Iommi, Geezer Butler, and Bill Ward) had performed together live. Osbourne, who was no longer able to walk due to his advanced Parkinson's disease, sang while seated on a throne. Seventeen days after the show, Osbourne died at the age of 76.

The concert was streamed worldwide via pay per view with a broadcast delay, with supporting acts including two supergroups of musicians serving as the house band. Proceeds from the event totalled £140 million (around $190 million USD), making the event the third highest-grossing benefit concert of all time. Funds were donated to Acorns Children's Hospice, Birmingham Children's Hospital, and Cure Parkinson's.

== Background ==
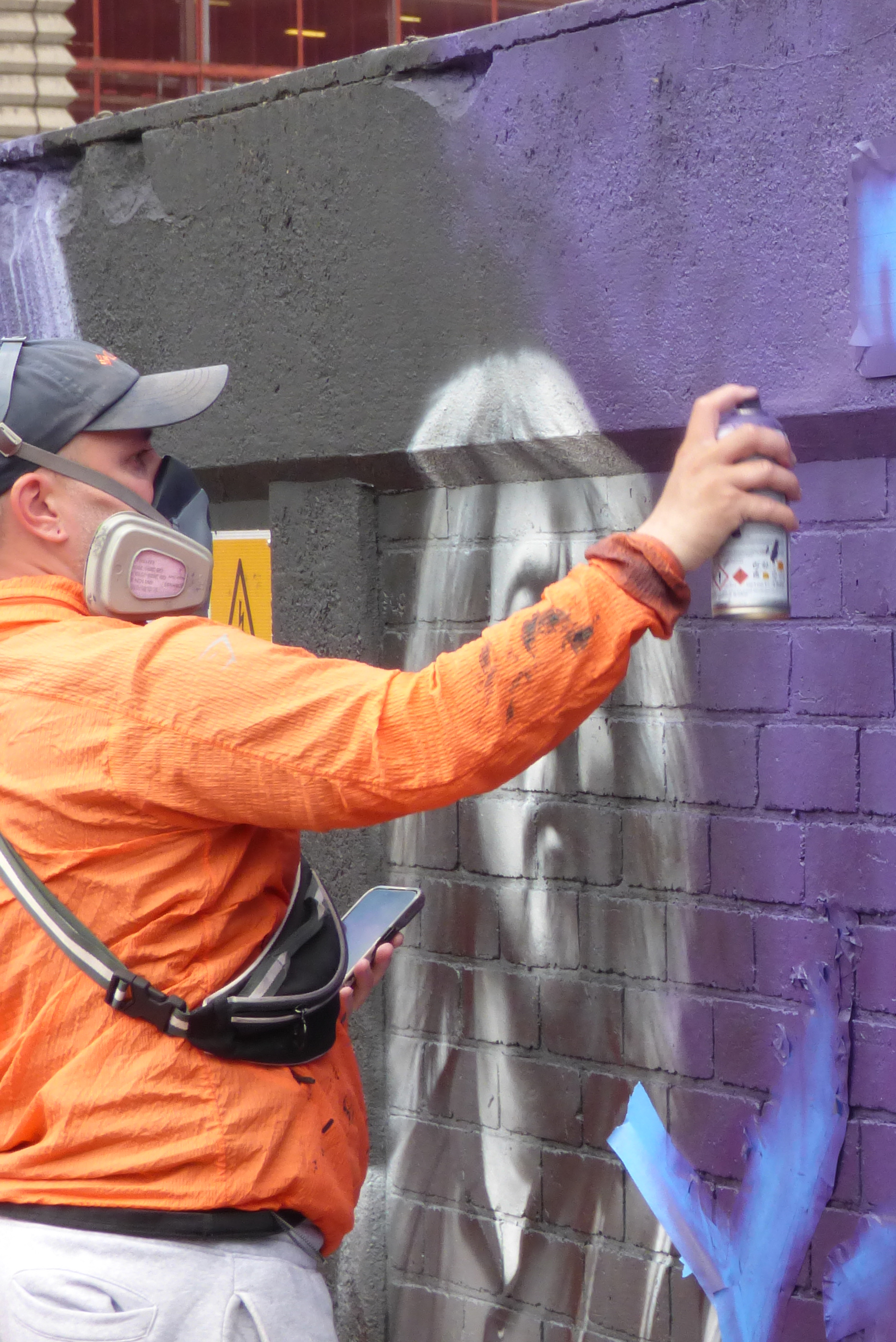
Mr Murals completing his Black Sabbath mural outside Birmingham New Street railway station, 25 June 2025

Black Sabbath were formed in Aston, Birmingham, England, in 1968 by Geezer Butler, Tony Iommi, Ozzy Osbourne and Bill Ward, who grew up within a short distance of each other, and of Villa Park, in the district. The band developed a style that came to be known as heavy metal and achieved worldwide success, selling over 75 million albums. Osbourne was fired from the band in 1979 for substance abuse and pursued a fruitful solo career, but occasionally reunited with the group. The original line-up had last performed together at Ozzfest 2005. The band's previous last concert was at Genting Arena in 2017 as part of The End Tour, but with Tommy Clufetos replacing Bill Ward as drummer.

Osbourne was diagnosed with Parkinson's disease in February 2019, and suffered spinal damage from a fall that same year. He rarely performed in the years after, but in August 2022 made a surprise appearance with Iommi to close the Commonwealth Games at Birmingham's Alexander Stadium. By early 2025, he had lost his ability to walk due to Parkinson's. Black Sabbath and Osbourne's farewell charity concert was announced by Osbourne's wife Sharon Osbourne on 5 February 2025. The name "Back to the Beginning" refers to the band's formation in Aston, as Osbourne insisted on staging one final performance to "give back to the place where I was born".

One week before the concert, the four original band members were made Freemen of the City of Birmingham. To coincide with the event, Birmingham Museum and Art Gallery launched its "Ozzy Osbourne: Working Class Hero" exhibition, displaying his awards, memorabilia and photographs. A mural depicting the band was painted by artist Mr Murals outside Birmingham New Street railway station on Navigation Street, and completed in the days before the show. It was visited and signed by the four band members on 29 June 2025. Jack Osbourne hosted the premiere cinema screening of The Nine Lives of Ozzy Osbourne at Millennium Point on the eve of the concert.

== Production ==
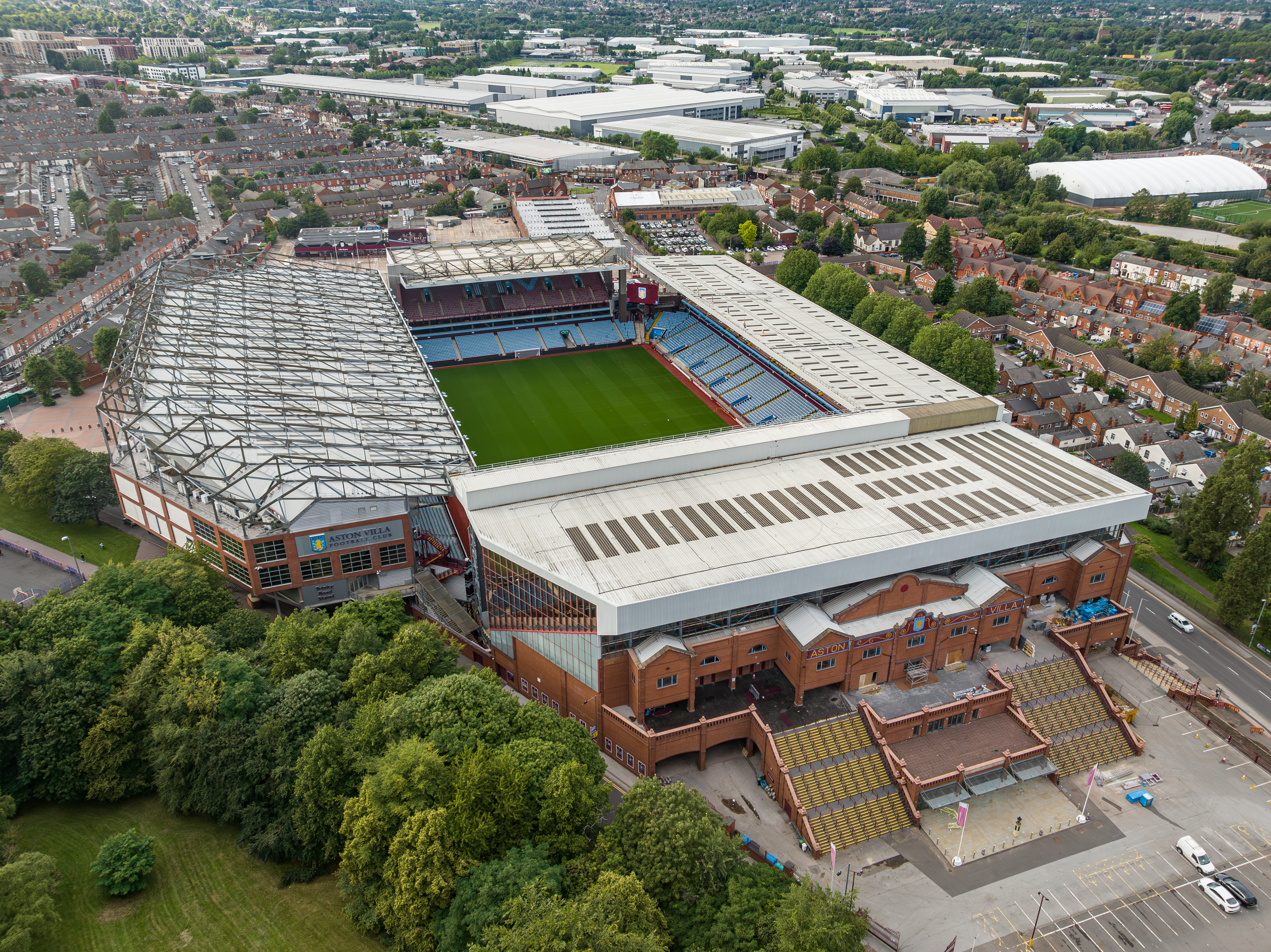
Villa Park, host site of the event

Tom Morello served as musical director for the concert, which took place on 5 July 2025 at Villa Park in Aston. Morello's stated intention was to make it the "greatest heavy metal show ever". He compared it to the Freddie Mercury Tribute Concert in scope, and was grateful that all members of Black Sabbath were alive to enjoy the production.

The stadium event was produced by Live Nation, with the accompanying broadcast co-produced by Kiswe and Mercury Studios. A revolving stage was utilized to quickly transition between musical acts, borrowing a concept famously used for the London portion of Live Aid. Promoter Andy Copping of Live Nation spent two years working to put the show together. He had wanted to present the concert in 2024, but it was delayed after Ozzy Osbourne experienced health setbacks.

Black Sabbath began rehearsing their set a month prior to the event at a studio in Oxfordshire. The first rehearsal for opening acts was on 3 July 2025 at Villa Park, and included a group photoshoot by Ross Halfin. Final rehearsals and soundchecks were held for all participating bands inside Villa Park on the eve of the concert.

Ozzy Osbourne: No Escape from Now is a Paramount+ documentary that followed Osbourne between 2022 and 2025, and showcased the concert's development. Osbourne also wrote about preparing for the show in his memoir, Last Rites.

== Concert synopsis ==
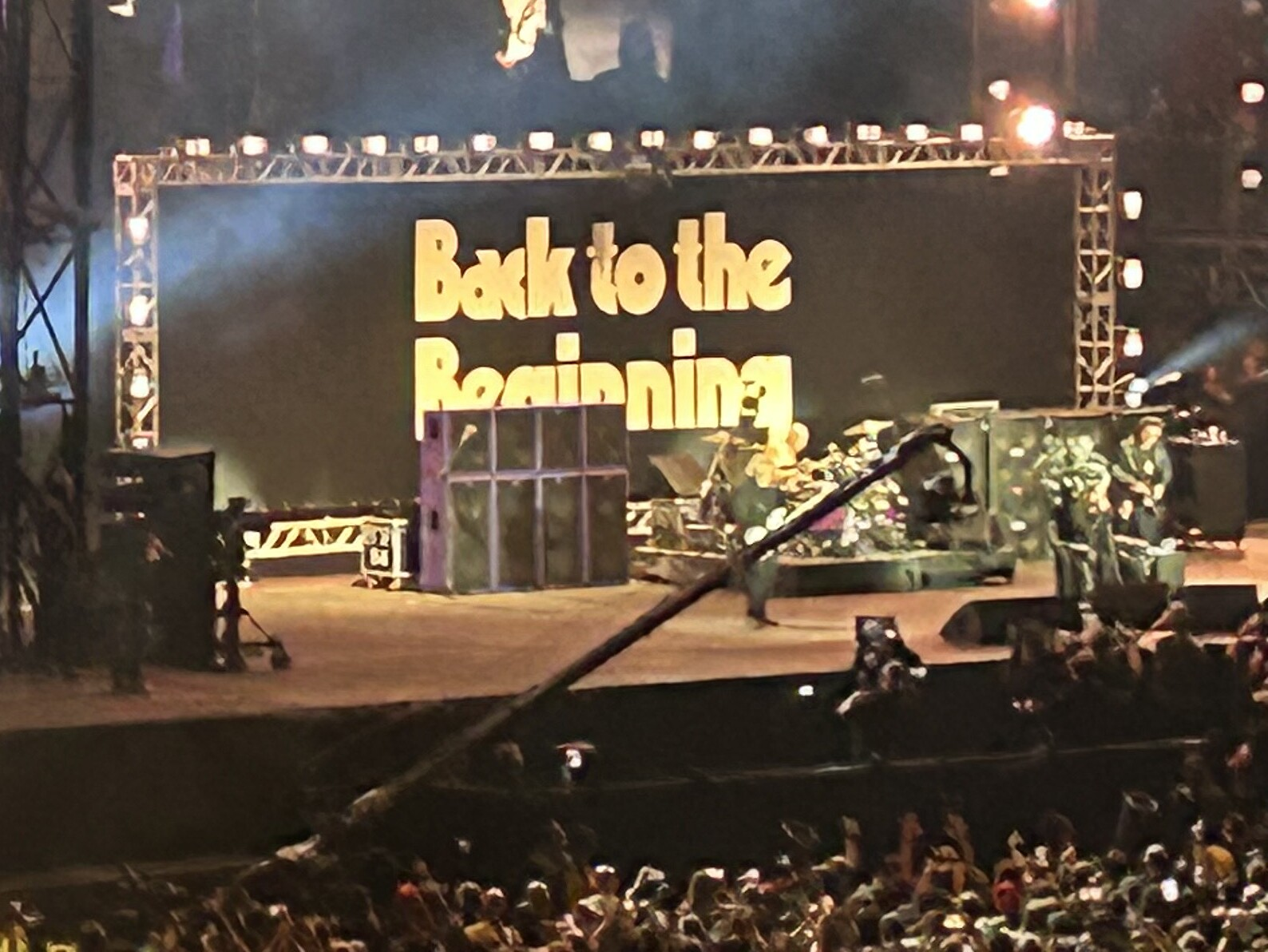
Black Sabbath performing at the concert, with Ozzy Osbourne singing from a throne

The concert lasted ten hours, beginning at 13:00 BST (12:00 UTC) and running until the local curfew of 23:00 BST. Sid Wilson of Slipknot performed a preshow DJ set while fans entered the stadium. Jason Momoa, who starred in an unreleased music video for Ozzy Osbourne's "Scary Little Green Men", hosted the event.

The concert featured fourteen supporting acts, including two supergroups with various musicians and guest vocalists. The supporting acts played sets that mixed covers of Black Sabbath and Ozzy Osbourne songs with those from their own catalogues. A drum-off was held between multiple drummers at the mid-point of the show. Video tributes were aired between sets from artists who could not make the event, including AC/DC, Def Leppard, Billy Idol, Elton John, Cyndi Lauper, Judas Priest, Marilyn Manson, and Dolly Parton. Prerecorded performances were also streamed, including "Mr. Crowley" by Jack Black and "Changes" by Fred Durst. Ozzy Osbourne played the penultimate set with his solo band, and then joined Black Sabbath to close the show.

Following the event, Kelly Osbourne, Ozzy and Sharon's daughter, accepted Sid Wilson's backstage marriage proposal. Ozzy Osbourne died on 22 July 2025, seventeen days after the concert.

=== Notable absences ===
Judas Priest were invited to participate, but were unavailable as they were scheduled to be opening for Scorpions' 60th anniversary concert in Hanover, Germany, the same night. They released a cover of Black Sabbath's "War Pigs" the week of the show to honour the band. Robert Plant was invited to attend by Tony Iommi, but declined. Alex Lifeson and Geddy Lee of Rush were originally supposed to perform, but had to back out after "other things came up". Wolfgang Van Halen was originally advertised for the event, but pulled out as his band Mammoth were opening for Creed in the United States, and the travel would not have been logistically possible. The surviving members of Soundgarden (Matt Cameron, Ben Shepherd, and Kim Thayil) were advertised for the concert, but did not appear due to scheduling conflicts. Jonathan Davis was also advertised as a performer, but only appeared in a prerecorded video tribute. Mötley Crüe could not perform due to "health issues within the band." Megadeth was not invited to the event due to scheduling conflicts with their own tour in Europe as well as time constraints at the show. The Pretty Reckless were invited, but could not fit their schedule in-between dates opening for AC/DC in London. Sharon Osbourne removed an unnamed band from the show after they demanded payment for appearing, and vowed to reveal their identity after the event concluded. On a podcast with Jamie Kennedy, Jack Osbourne did not reveal the band's name and refuted speculated artists like Wolfgang Van Halen and Mötley Crüe, but did mention that they toured with Ozzy.

=== Performances ===
The running order and songs performed:

1. Mastodon (Brann Dailor, Nick Johnston, Bill Kelliher, Rasta, Troy Sanders)
  - "Black Tongue"
  - "Blood and Thunder"
  - "Supernaut" (ft. Danny Carey, Eloy Casagrande, Mario Duplantier)
2. Rival Sons (Dave Beste, Jay Buchanan, Scott Holiday, Michael Miley, Jesse Nason)
  - "Do Your Worst"
  - "Electric Funeral"
  - "Secret"
3. Anthrax (Joey Belladonna, Frank Bello, Charlie Benante, Jonathan Donais, Scott Ian)
  - "Indians"
  - "Into the Void"
4. Halestorm (Arejay Hale, Lzzy Hale, Joe Hottinger, Josh Smith)
  - "Love Bites (So Do I)"
  - "Rain Your Blood On Me"
  - "Perry Mason"
5. Lamb of God (Willie Adler, Randy Blythe, John Campbell, Art Cruz, Mark Morton)
  - "Laid to Rest"
  - "Redneck"
  - "Children of the Grave"
6. Tom Morello's All Stars (Supergroup A)
  - "The Ultimate Sin" (ft. Nuno Bettencourt, Mike Bordin, David Ellefson, Lzzy Hale, Jake E. Lee, Adam Wakeman)
  - "Shot in the Dark" (ft. Bordin, David Draiman, Ellefson, Lee, Wakeman)
  - "Sweet Leaf" (ft. Bettencourt, Bordin, Draiman, Ellefson, Ian)
  - "Believer" (ft. Bello, Bettencourt, Whitfield Crane, Ian, Sleep Token II, Wakeman)
  - "Changes" (ft. Bello, Bettencourt, Sleep Token II, Wakeman, Yungblud)
7. Jack Black (ft. Revel Ian, Roman Morello, Yoyoka Soma, Hugo Weiss)
  - "Mr. Crowley" – prerecorded
8. Alice in Chains (Jerry Cantrell, William DuVall, Mike Inez, Sean Kinney)
  - "Man in the Box"
  - "Would?"
  - "Fairies Wear Boots"
9. Gojira (Christian Andreu, Joe Duplantier, Mario Duplantier, Jean-Michel Labadie)
  - "Stranded"
  - "Silvera"
  - "Mea Culpa (Ah! Ça ira!)" (ft. Marina Viotti)
  - "Under the Sun"
10. Drum-off (ft. Travis Barker, Danny Carey, Chad Smith)
  - "Symptom of the Universe" (ft. Bettencourt, Morello, Rudy Sarzo)
11. Tom Morello's All Stars (Supergroup B)
  - "Breaking the Law" (ft. Danny Carey, Billy Corgan, K. K. Downing, Adam Jones, Morello, Sarzo)
  - "Snowblind" (ft. Carey, Corgan, Downing, Jones, Morello, Sarzo)
  - "Flying High Again" (ft. Bettencourt, Sammy Hagar, Vernon Reid, Sarzo, Smith, Wakeman)
  - "Rock Candy" (ft. Bettencourt, Hagar, Morello, Sarzo, Smith, Wakeman)
  - "Bark at the Moon" (ft. Barker, Bettencourt, Papa V Perpetua, Reid, Sarzo, Wakeman)
  - "Train Kept A-Rollin'" (ft. Barker, Bettencourt, Morello, Sarzo, Steven Tyler, Andrew Watt, Ronnie Wood)
  - "Walk This Way" (ft. Bettencourt, Morello, Sarzo, Smith, Tyler, Watt)
  - "Whole Lotta Love" (ft. Bettencourt, Morello, Sarzo, Smith, Tyler, Watt)
12. Pantera (Phil Anselmo, Benante, Rex Brown, Zakk Wylde)
  - "Cowboys from Hell"
  - "Walk"
  - "Planet Caravan"
  - "Electric Funeral"
13. Tool (Danny Carey, Justin Chancellor, Jones, Maynard James Keenan)
  - "Forty Six & 2"
  - "Hand of Doom"
  - "Ænema"
14. Slayer (Tom Araya, Paul Bostaph, Gary Holt, Kerry King)
  - "Disciple"
  - "War Ensemble"
  - "Wicked World"
  - "South of Heaven"
  - "Raining Blood"
  - "Angel of Death"
15. Fred Durst (ft. Telalit Charsky, Mike Waldron)
  - "Changes" - prerecorded
16. Guns N' Roses (Isaac Carpenter, Richard Fortus, Duff McKagan, Axl Rose, Slash)
  - "It's Alright"
  - "Never Say Die"
  - "Junior's Eyes"
  - "Sabbath Bloody Sabbath"
  - "Welcome to the Jungle"
  - "Paradise City"
17. Metallica (Kirk Hammett, James Hetfield, Robert Trujillo, Lars Ulrich)
  - "Hole in the Sky"
  - "Creeping Death"
  - "For Whom the Bell Tolls"
  - "Johnny Blade"
  - "Battery"
  - "Master of Puppets"
18. Ozzy Osbourne (ft. Tommy Clufetos, Inez, Wakeman, Wylde)
  - "I Don't Know"
  - "Mr. Crowley"
  - "Suicide Solution"
  - "Mama, I'm Coming Home"
  - "Crazy Train"
19. Black Sabbath (Geezer Butler, Tony Iommi, Osbourne, Bill Ward)
  - "War Pigs"
  - "N.I.B."
  - "Iron Man"
  - "Paranoid"

== Reception ==
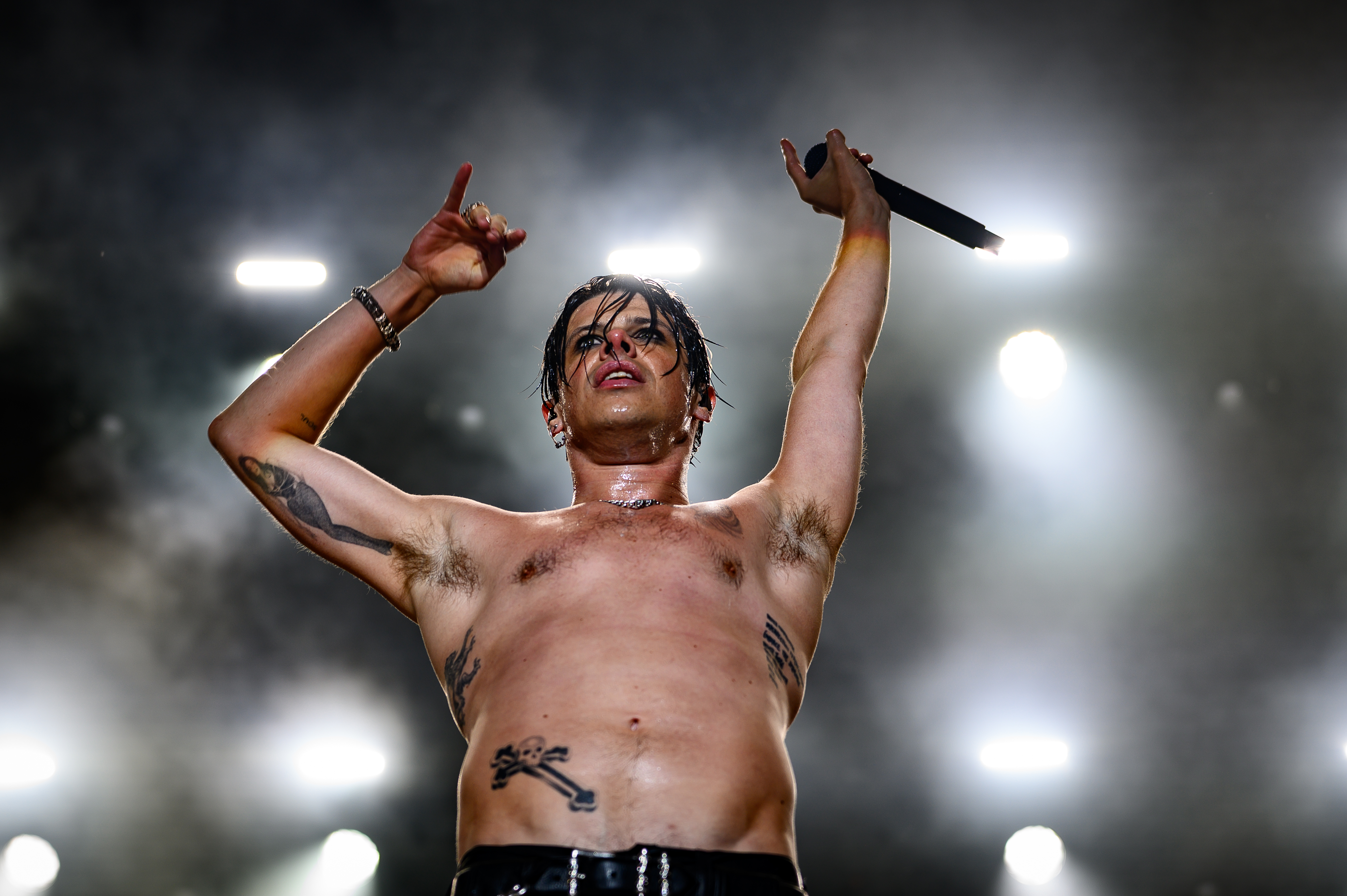
Yungblud, whose cover of "Changes" was widely praised

Mark Beaumont of The Independent rated the show five stars out of five, giving special praise to Yungblud's cover of "Changes". Rhys Buchanan of Rolling Stone also gave the show a perfect rating; Buchanan said Yungblud's performance, which he dedicated to Diogo Jota who died two days prior, "stopped the stadium in its tracks". Michael Hann of The Guardian rated the event four out of five, singling out the performances of Black Sabbath, Gojira, Guns N' Roses, Metallica, and Yungblud as highlights of the show.

Keith Kahn-Harris of The Quietus noted that several subgenres of heavy metal went unrepresented at the concert, including doom metal and grindcore. One critic lamented the bill having only four female performers – Telalit Charsky, Lzzy Hale, Yoyoka Soma, and Marina Viotti.

David Draiman's appearance was booed by few members of the audience, which was attributed to his pro-Israel stance in light of the Gaza genocide. He had also leaked the show's run sheet online the day before the event. The decision to air a video tribute by Marilyn Manson was criticized, as the artist had recently cancelled a gig at Brighton Centre after local backlash to his sexual assault allegations.

== Financial impact ==
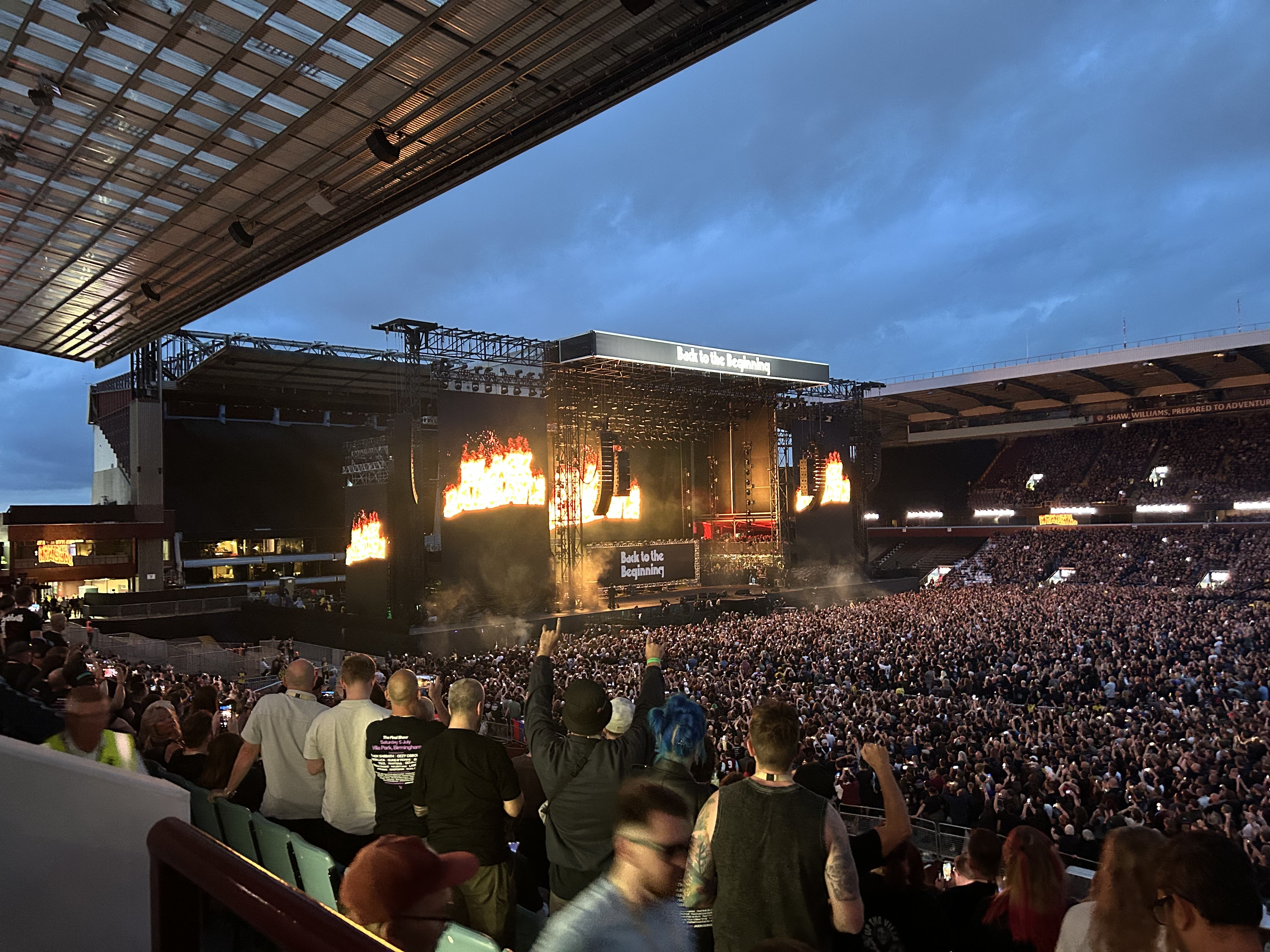
Villa Park during the sold-out event

All 45,000 tickets for the concert sold out in 16 minutes, with 150,000 people having waited in a virtual queue for the opportunity to attend. Around 20% of tickets were purchased by international fans. None of the acts on the bill were paid, only receiving reimbursement for their travel expenses.

The entire event was streamed online via pay per view, with a two-hour broadcast delay, and peaked at 5.8 million concurrent streams. Some pubs advertising watch parties were forced to cancel after producer Kiswe threatened legal action if they did not purchase an expensive commercial licence. Others did show the event, and reported capacity crowds and shortages of beer.

The region attracted an estimated 300,000 tourists for the show and other events that same weekend, including two concerts by Jeff Lynne's ELO and a cricket test match, netting the West Midlands economy £20 million. £140 million (around $190 million USD) was raised by the event for charity, making it the third highest-grossing benefit concert of all time. Proceeds will be divided equally between Acorns Children's Hospice, Birmingham Children's Hospital, and Cure Parkinson's.

== Releases ==
=== Film ===
A 147 minute concert film of the event titled Ozzy & Black Sabbath: Back To The Beginning was released theatrically on 28 October 2026, with a DVD and Blu-ray release to follow later on.

Ozzy Osbourne: No Escape From Now, a documentary released on Paramount+ on 7 October 2025, documents the final six years of Osbourne's life, including his final performance at Back to the Beginning. The documentary was in the works prior to Osbourne's death.

=== Audio ===
The Yungblud-fronted live cover of "Changes" from the event was released as a charity single on 18 July 2025 to streaming platforms. Yungblud donated all proceeds from the single to Acorns Children's Hospice, Birmingham Children's Hospital, and Cure Parkinson's. He later won the Grammy Award for Best Rock Performance for the single at the 2026 ceremony.

== See also ==
- List of highest-grossing benefit concerts
