= Birmingham Women's NHS Foundation Trust =

UK NHS foundation trust

Coordinates: 52.4532°N 1.9427°W

Birmingham Women's NHS Foundation Trust ran Birmingham Women's Hospital in the Edgbaston area of Birmingham, situated very close to the University of Birmingham.

On 1 February 2008, it was granted NHS Foundation Trust Status. It merged into Birmingham Women's and Children's NHS Foundation Trust in 2017

== Services ==
The first Birmingham maternity hospital was established in 1842 to reduce the number of women and children dying needlessly from puerperal fever and childbirth related infections. This hospital has been at its present site since 1994, and is one of only two trusts in the UK specialising in women's health care. They provide a focused range of health care services, primarily, though not exclusively, to women and their families. These are:

- Maternity and foetal medicine services
- Neonatal care and newborn transport service
- Milk bank—the only one in the West Midlands. It provides donor breast milk for its own neonatal babies and also distributes donor breast milk to many local and national hospitals including Birmingham Children's Hospital.
- Fertility services, see separate entry for the Birmingham Women's Fertility Centre
- Gynaecology
- Genetics—its genetics laboratories are one of the largest in Europe and, as part of a collaboration with the University of Birmingham, University Hospitals Birmingham NHS FT, Birmingham Children's Hospital NHS FT and Academic Health Science Network, it will be one of 11 centres across the country that are leading the way in delivering the NHS 100,000 Genomes Project.
- Imaging and pathology services—testing more than 60,000 samples a year.

Based in Edgbaston, adjacent to the University Hospital Birmingham NHS Foundation Trust, there are around 150 adult beds and 43 neonatal cots. It had an annual income of over £90 million. On average 50,000 patients a year are cared for, with approximately 3,000 operations and delivery of more than 8,000 babies making it one of the busiest maternity departments in the UK.

As a specialist teaching healthcare trust, the focus is on delivering five distinct but inter-related clinical services. Brought together, these services combine to offer secondary local services to women, men and babies living in South Birmingham and tertiary services throughout the West Midlands and beyond.

The trust established a National Sperm Bank in January 2015 in a partnership with the National Gamete Donation Trust.

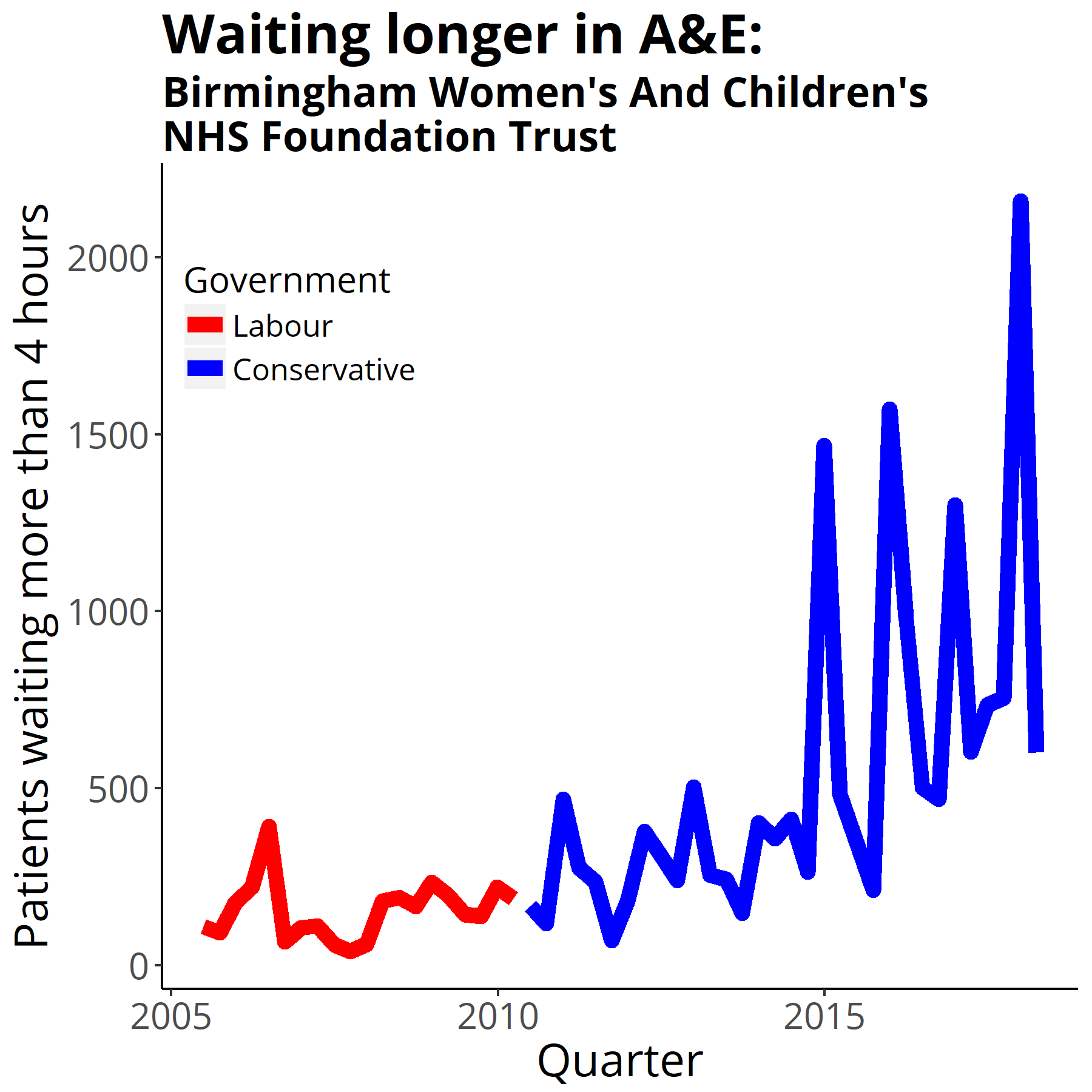
Four-hour target in the emergency department quarterly figures from NHS England Data from https://www.england.nhs.uk/statistics/statistical-work-areas/ae-waiting-times-and-activity/

== Closure ==
Sarah-Jane Marsh, Chief Executive of Birmingham Children's Hospital NHS Foundation Trust, was appointed Chief Executive with effect from 1 July 2015. She managed both trusts, and reviewed the trust's rebuilding plans.

The trust agreed in July 2016 that it would merge with the Children’s Hospital NHS Foundation Trust in 2017.

== See also ==
- Healthcare in West Midlands
- List of hospitals in England
- List of NHS trusts
