= Centre for Human Reproductive Science =

British medical research institute

Coordinates: 52.4530°N 1.9388°W

Centre for Human Reproductive Science

The Centre for Human Reproductive Science was established in December 2006 to further develop research and innovation in fertility diagnosis and treatment, working in partnership as the academic and research wing of the Birmingham Women's Fertility Centre at Birmingham Women's Hospital and the University of Birmingham Medical School. A particular emphasis in the biomedical research strategy is placing research and discovery in the true physiological context.

== Research and funding ==
The current focus and funding of the Centre includes:

- Evaluation of the clinical and cost-effectiveness of three cycles of IUI versus one of IVF. The UNiTY trial funded by the National Institute for Health and Care Research (NIHR).
- Research into advanced computer-assisted diagnosis of male fertility issues - initially funded by the EPSRC - culminating in the development of the FAST (Flagellar Analysis and Sperm Tracking) software.
- Translational medicine research funded by the National Institute for Health and Care Research (NIHR) on Andrology and male factors in healthy live birth which, for the first ever time, has revealed a strong male factor for miscarriage in the male related to the choice / selection of sperm for fertilisation in assisted conception.
- Developing translational technologies for sperm diagnostics and selection in light of the above.
- Research into the role for paternal sperm DNA damage in unexplained miscarriage, its diagnosis and treatment - as part of the Tommy's National Centre for Miscarriage Research.
- How engineering design and additive manufacture can be guided by human development processes - funded by the EPSRC.

== Research advances ==
The Centre for Human Reproductive Science team alongside the Fertility Centre have made notable advances in various areas, including achievements in:

- Translational medicine, such as the invention of the male Fertell over-the-counter home fertility test.
- The first detailed studies of ion channels in human sperm.
- A clinical trial of how to select the best sperm for ICSI and the associated basic science of how it works - HABSelect that, for the first time in any trial dataset, showed that up to 40% of miscarriage may be explained by which sperm fertilises the oocyte.
- Detailed characterisation of the events occurring in sperm in response to steroid hormones, including the discovery of slow calcium oscillations, now thought to possibly regulate motility. To date the identity of the cell receptors involved has not been clearly elucidated.
- Substantial follow-up data of children born through IVF treatment to check for increased risks associated with the treatment.
- Research on the area of gametogenesis, this includes research derivation of gametes from embryonic stem cells by Dr Sarah Conner at the University of Birmingham and work to identify the genes that are expressed during normal and perturbed spermatogenesis.
- Due to its interest in human embryonic stem cell research, the group and associated clinic was one of five selected around the UK to receive Medical Research Council funding to elevate the IVF laboratories to 'cleanroom' levels.
- The Centre for Human Reproductive Science also has psychology collaborations to actively pursue research enabling better understanding of patient feelings and care during fertility treatment; and issues surrounding motivation to be a donor and receipt of donor gametes.

== Fertility treatment and diagnosis ==
The Centre for Human Reproductive Science does not directly enter into patient treatment or diagnosis being focussed upon research. These are delivered through the affiliated Birmingham Women's Fertility Centre at Birmingham Women's Hospital.

== Management ==
The current director and research lead is Jackson Kirkman-Brown MBE PhD. The team includes members from across the world. Current deputy director, and Human Fertilisation and Embryology Authority person responsible on the research licence, is Dr Meurig Gallagher, who has a basis in translational mathematics and fluid mechanics of reproduction.
