= Telalit Charsky =

Israeli cellist (born 1986)

Telalit Charsky טללית צ'רסקי
- Born: June 20, 1986 (age 39); Tel Aviv, Israel
- Genres: Classical
- Occupation: Musician
- Instrument: Cello
- Years active: 2003–present
- Website: telalit.com

Telalit Charsky (Hebrew: טללית צ'רסקי; born June 20, 1986) is an Israeli cellist, now residing in the United States. She performs as Telalit, stylized in all caps.

== Early life and education ==
Charsky was born in Tel Aviv on June 20, 1986. Her father was a lawyer, and her mother was a ballet dancer. Conductor Yuval Zaliouk is her maternal uncle.

She began playing cello at the age of four. Jacqueline du Pré has been named as her primary inspiration for playing.

Charsky studied at the Buchmann-Mehta School of Music at Tel Aviv University and graduated with a bachelor's of science in music performance. Health complications from juvenile diabetes caused her to delay pursuit of an advanced degree for one year. She went on to study under Ralph Kirshbaum at Royal Northern College of Music, graduating with a master's degree in music performance.

Bernard Greenhouse mentored Charsky later in the final years of his life. He bequeathed her his cello, which she still plays.

== Career ==
Charsky turned down an offer to join the Israel Philharmonic Orchestra, opting to instead tour the world as a soloist.

She recorded a duet with pianist Ron Regev in 2013, performing the complete piano sonatas of Ludwig van Beethoven. The album was recognized by The Violoncello Foundation as one of the best cello recordings of the year.

Charsky released a cover of "Say Something" in 2013, with an accompanying music video directed by Eyal Refaelov.

Since moving to Nashville in 2019, she has worked as a studio musician and music arranger for Netflix, the Call of Duty video game series, and the Star Wars franchise.

Charsky accompanied Fred Durst for his cover of "Changes" that aired during the Back to the Beginning concert on July 5, 2025.
