= List of highest-grossing live music artists =

Ranking published by Billboard and Pollstar

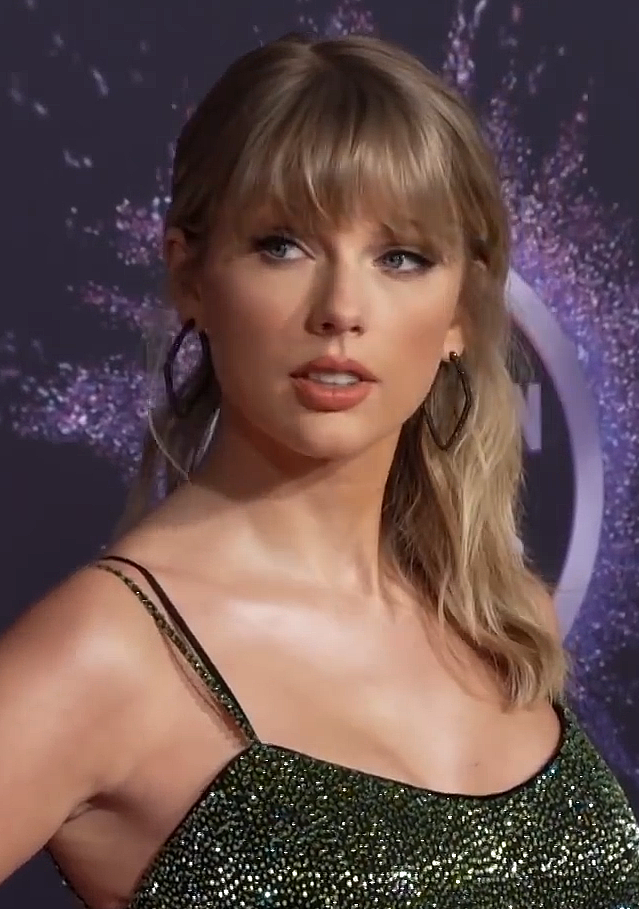
Taylor Swift is the highest-grossing live-music artist of all time.

The highest-grossing live-music artists (also known as "highest-grossing touring artists") (Note: The figures are not limited from touring and may include standalone concerts or concert residencies.) are reported by Billboard and Pollstar boxscores. The cumulative figures may be incomplete because not all concert dates are reported by those publications. For simplification, the figures are presented in nominal dollars without being adjusted for inflation, hence they do not reflect the real value of revenue from older concerts, and contemporary musicians may be overrepresented.

Taylor Swift is the highest-grossing live-music artist of all time, collecting $3 billion according to Pollstar. U2, Coldplay, Bruce Springsteen, and Elton John also passed two-billion mark in concert revenue. The Rolling Stones are the highest-grossing live music group of all time, collecting over $2.9 billion according to Billboard Boxscore. The concert industry is very male-dominated, and only six women have grossed more than $1 billion (as of 2026), with Madonna being the first.

== All-time ranking ==
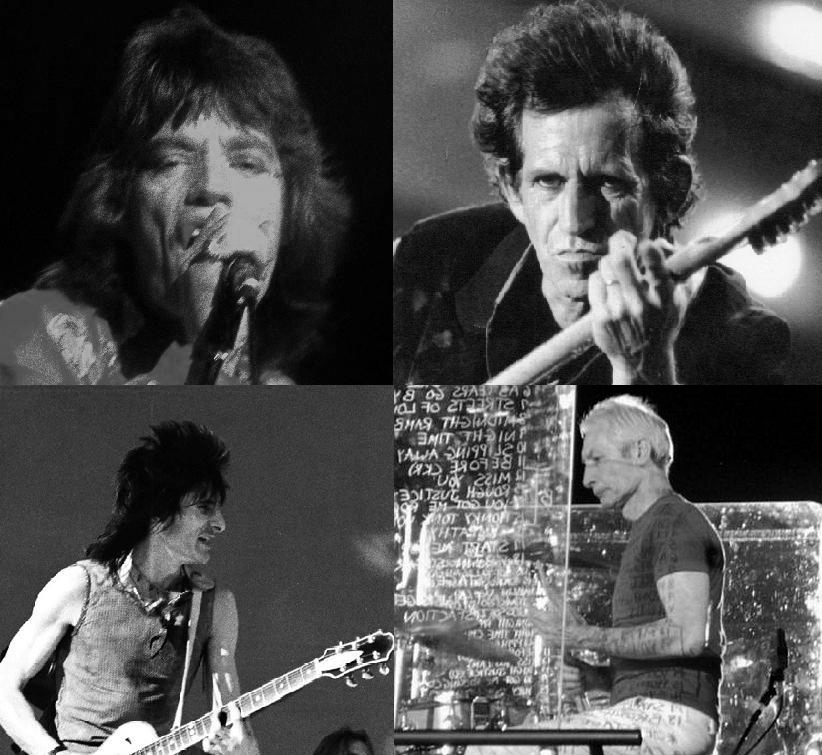
The Rolling Stones are the highest-grossing live music group of all time.

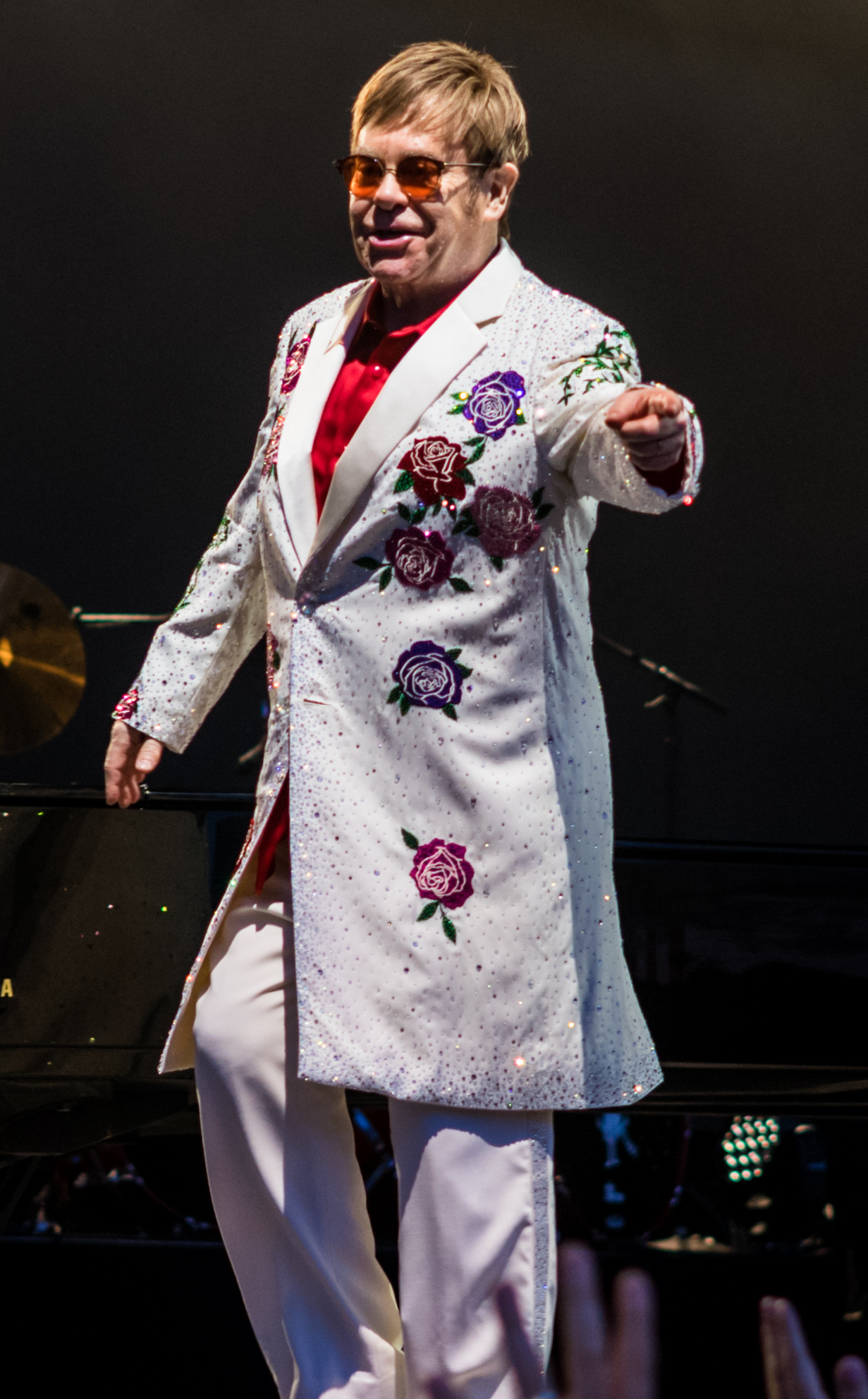
Elton John is the highest-grossing male solo live music artist of all time.

=== Pollstar ===
Artists with concert revenue of over US$1 billion according to Pollstar
Rank	Artists	Nationality	Nominal gross	Tickets sold	As of	Ref.
1	Taylor Swift	United States	$3.13 billion	18.88 million	2024	
2	Coldplay	United Kingdom	$2.49 billion	24.80 million	2025	
3	The Rolling Stones	United Kingdom	$2.40 billion	22.99 million	2024	(Note: The Rolling Stones grossed $2,165,280,638 as of 2022 according to Pollstar. They expanded the number with $235,077,193 in 2024.)
4	U2	Ireland	$2.37 billion	26.84 million	2024	
5	Bruce Springsteen · E Street Band	United States	$2.16 billion	25.97 million	2024	(Note: Bruce Springsteen grossed $1,527,407,373 as of 2022 according to Pollstar. He expanded the number with $379,496,085 in 2023 and $251,296,432 in 2024.)
6	Elton John	United Kingdom	$2 billion	22 million	2023	
7	Metallica	United States	$1.88 billion	26.04 million	2025	(Note: Metallica grossed $1.4 billion as of 2019 according to Pollstar. They expanded the number with at least $21,897,870 in 2022 and at least $455,668,518 during the M72 World Tour in the years from 2023 to 2025, although there is no complete data for 2022 from Pollstar.)
8	Beyoncé	United States	$1.78 billion	11.83 million	2025	
9	Ed Sheeran	United Kingdom	$1.75 billion	19.61 million	2025	
10	Eagles	United States	$1.62 billion	10.99 million	2025	
11	Madonna	United States	$1.62 billion	12.80 million	2024	
12	Pink	United States	$1.44 billion	12.95 million	2024	
13	Kenny Chesney	United States	$1.36 billion	18.20 million	2025	
14	Celine Dion	Canada	$1.35 billion	10.90 million	2022	
15	Bon Jovi	United States	$1.32 billion	17.75 million	2022	
16	Paul McCartney	United Kingdom	$1.32 billion	10.45 million	2022	
17	Billy Joel	United States	$1.18 billion	16.97 million	2022	
18	Lady Gaga	United States	$1.17 billion	8.6 million	2026	
19	Dave Matthews Band	United States	$1.13 billion	23.27 million	2025	
20	Guns N' Roses	United States	$1.10 billion	10.73 million	2025	
21	André Rieu	Netherlands	$1.05 billion	11.56 million	2025	
22	Iron Maiden	United Kingdom	$1.05 billion	10.58 million	2026	(Note: Iron Maiden grossed $1 billion as of 2025 according to Pollstar. They expanded the number with at least $46.4 million in 2026. The first attendance number is used from the 2025 Pollstar report, using only data from the year 2001 and onwards.)

=== Billboard ===
Artists with concert revenue of over US$1 billion according to Billboard
Rank	Artists	Nationality	Nominal gross	Tickets sold	As of	Ref.
1	The Rolling Stones	United Kingdom	$2.9 billion	28.9 million	2024	
2	U2	Ireland	$2.46 billion	28.9 million	2024	
3	Coldplay	United Kingdom	$2.41 billion	23.9 million	2025	
4	Bruce Springsteen · E Street Band	United States	$2.3 billion	22.6 million	2025	
5	Elton John	United Kingdom	$1.98 billion	20.6 million	2023	
6	Beyoncé	United States	$1.8 billion	13.2 million	2025	
7	Ed Sheeran	United Kingdom	$1.7 billion	18.9 million	2025	
8	Madonna	United States	$1.6 billion	12.8 million	2024	
9	Pink	United States	$1.41 billion	12 million	2024	
10	Metallica	United States	$1.29 billion	14.7 million	2025	(Note: Metallica grossed $593,100,000 as of February 2019, according to Billboard. They expanded the number with $177,434,939 at the end of 2019, $43,398,993 in 2022, $125,800,000 in 2023, $175,200,000 in 2024, $136,200,000 in 2025 and additional $41,500,000 in November 2025, but Billboard counts that in the 2026 touring year.)
11	Bad Bunny	Puerto Rico	$1.2 billion	7.1 million	2026	
12	Kenny Chesney	United States	$1.172 billion	17.9 million	2023	
13	Celine Dion	Canada	$1.115 billion	8.8 million	2019	(Note: Majority of Celine Dion's figure came from her Las Vegas concert residencies. She remains the highest-grossing residency artist of all time, with a total of $681 million as of 2019, according to Billboard.)
14	Lady Gaga	United States	$1.1 billion	8.4 million	2026	
15	Guns N' Roses	United States	$1.06 billion	12.4 million	2025	(Note: Guns N' Roses grossed $774,100,000 as of October 2021, according to Billboard. They expanded the number with $93,383,197 in 2022, $96,200,000 in 2023 and $95,600,000 in 2025.)
16	Bon Jovi	United States	$1.03 billion	—N/a	2016	
17	Eagles	United States	$1 billion	—N/a	2022	
18	Paul McCartney	United Kingdom	$1 billion	—N/a	2022	

=== By genre ===
==== Country ====
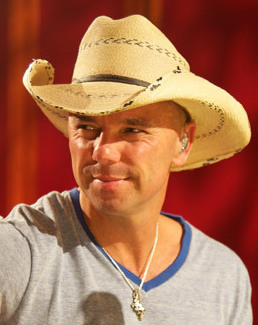
Kenny Chesney is the highest-grossing live country music artist according to Billboard.

Top 10 highest-grossing country music artists according to Billboard
Rank	Artists	Nationality	Nominal gross	Tickets sold	As of	Ref.
1	Kenny Chesney	United States	$1.172 billion	17.9 million	2023	
2	George Strait	United States	$733.7 million	11.5 million	2023	
3	Luke Bryan	United States	$498.1 million	8.6 million	2023	
4	Tim McGraw	United States	$434 million	11.1 million	2023	
5	Shania Twain	Canada	$421.1 million	6.1 million	2023	
6	Toby Keith	United States	$397.5 million	9.4 million	2023	
7	Jason Aldean	United States	$362.8 million	7.5 million	2023	
8	Rascal Flatts	United States	$360.6 million	7.8 million	2023	
9	Taylor Swift	United States	$339 million	4.5 million	2014 (Note: Taylor Swift has not staged country tours after 2014.)	
10	Brad Paisley	United States	$334.6 million	8.2 million	2023	

==== Hip-hop ====
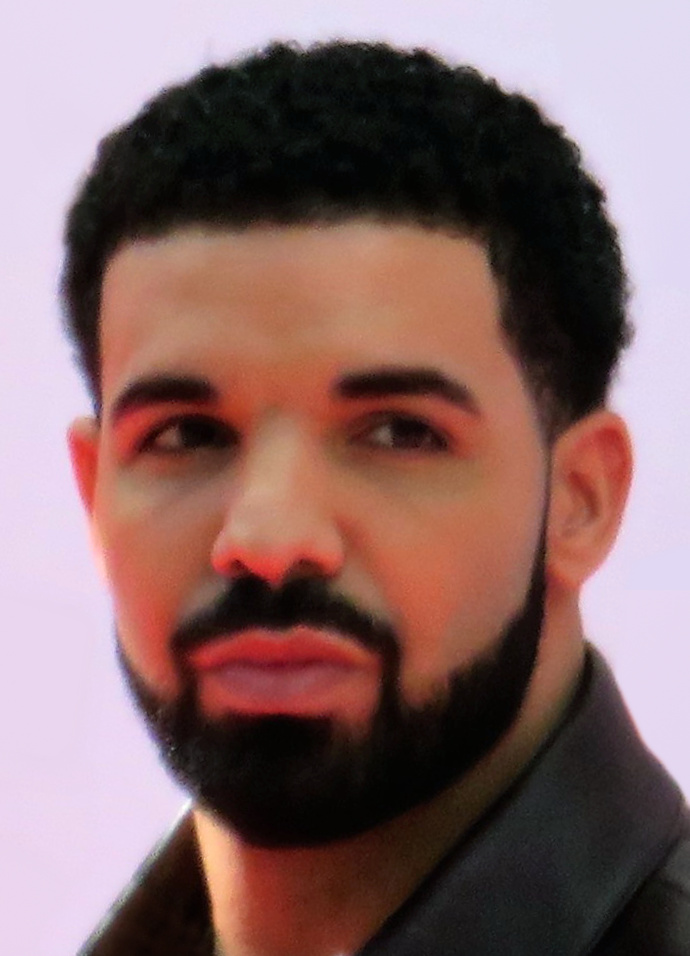
Drake is the highest-grossing hip-hop artist according to Billboard.

Top 10 highest-grossing rappers according to Billboard
Rank	Artists	Nationality	Nominal gross	As of	Ref.
1	Drake	Canada	$508.2 million	2024	
2	Jay-Z	United States	$430.5 million	2024	
3	Post Malone	United States	$245.7 million	2024	
4	Kendrick Lamar	United States	$164.5 million	2024	
5	Travis Scott	United States	$161.6 million	2024	
6	Kanye West	United States	$161.2 million	2024	
7	Eminem	United States	$151.7 million	2024	
8	50 Cent	United States	$150.3 million	2024	
9	Black Eyed Peas	United States	$119.4 million	2024	
10	Lil Wayne	United States	$111.7 million	2024	

==== Latin ====
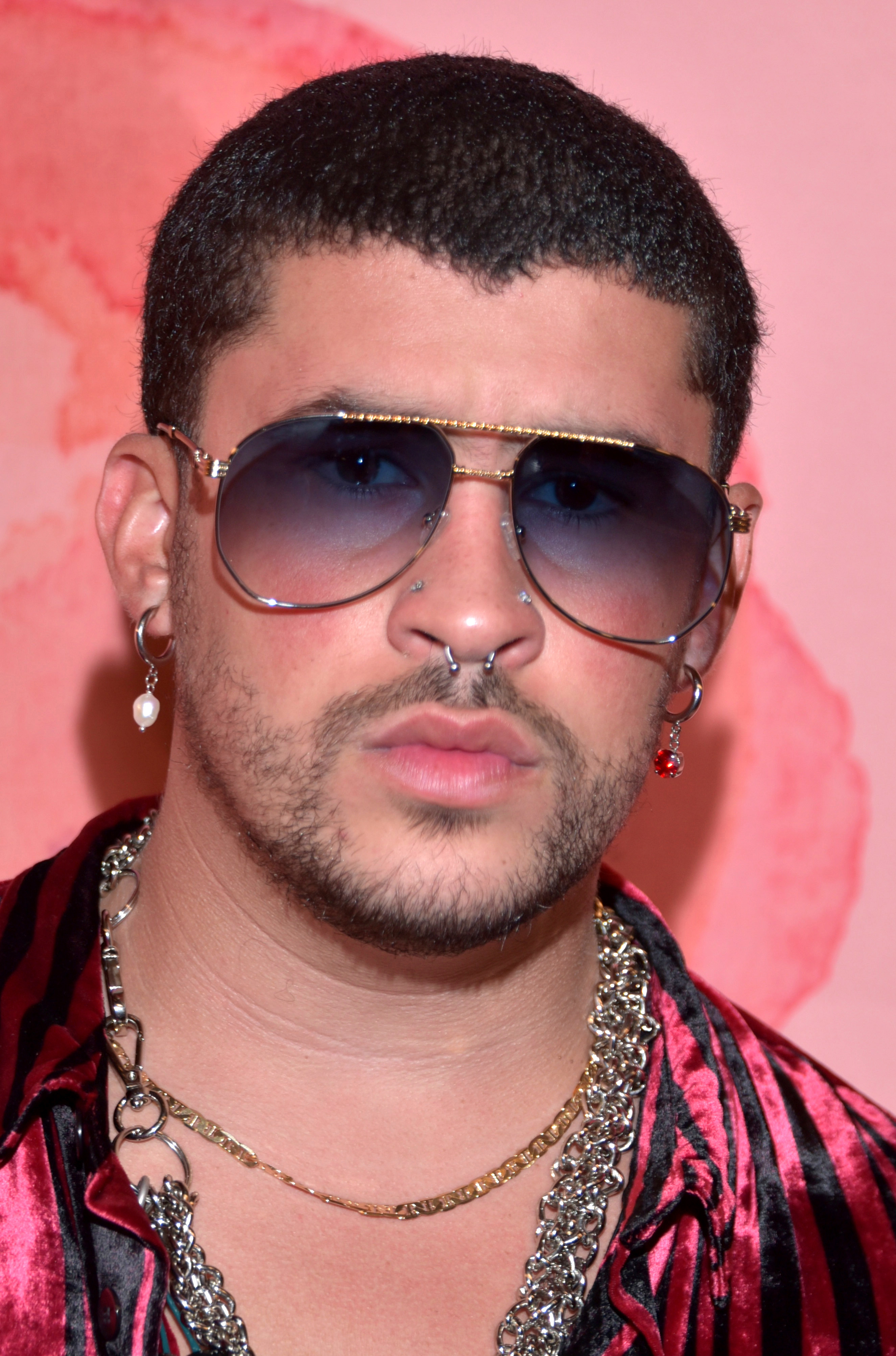
Bad Bunny is the highest-grossing live Latin music artist according to Billboard.

Top 10 highest-grossing Latin music artists according to either Billboard or Pollstar
Rank	Artist	Nationality	Nominal gross	Tickets sold	As of	Ref.
1	Bad Bunny	Puerto Rico	$1.2 billion	7.1 million	2026	
2	Luis Miguel	Mexico	$633.1 million	6.3 million	2024	
3	Shakira	Colombia	$529.7 million	4.9 million	2026	
4	Karol G	Colombia	$400.9 million	2.96 million	2024	
5	RBD	Mexico	$350.9 million	3.7 million	2024	
6	Marc Anthony	United States	$315 million	3.8 million	2023	
7	Daddy Yankee	Puerto Rico	$224.7 million	2.4 million	2023	
8	Maná	México	$197.39 million	2.9 million	2022	
9	Jennifer Lopez	United States	$191.6 million	1.4 million	2023	
10	Enrique Iglesias	Spain	$176.1 million	3.2 million	2023	

== Decade ranking ==
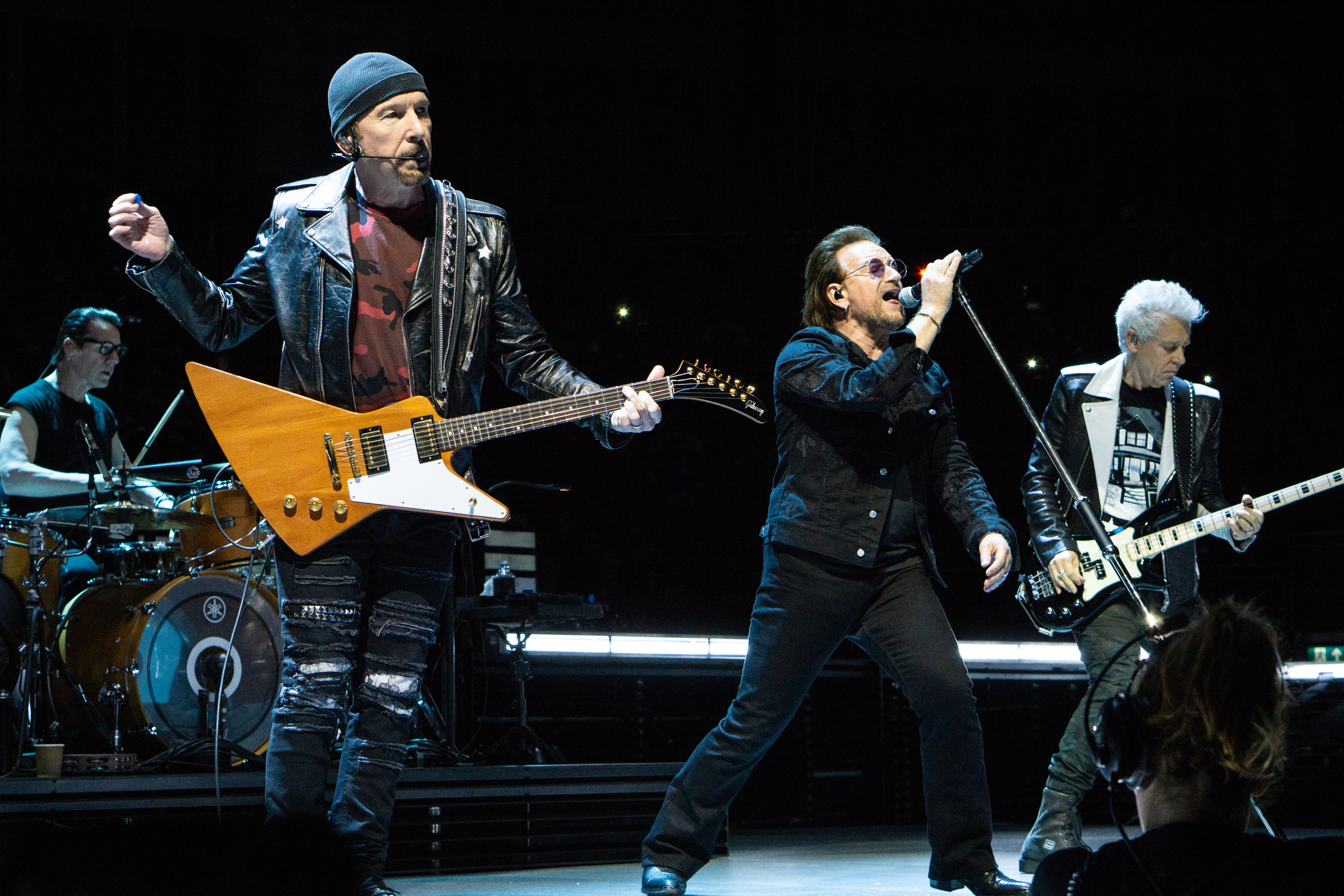
U2 is the highest-grossing live music act of the 2010s and the second highest of the 2000s.

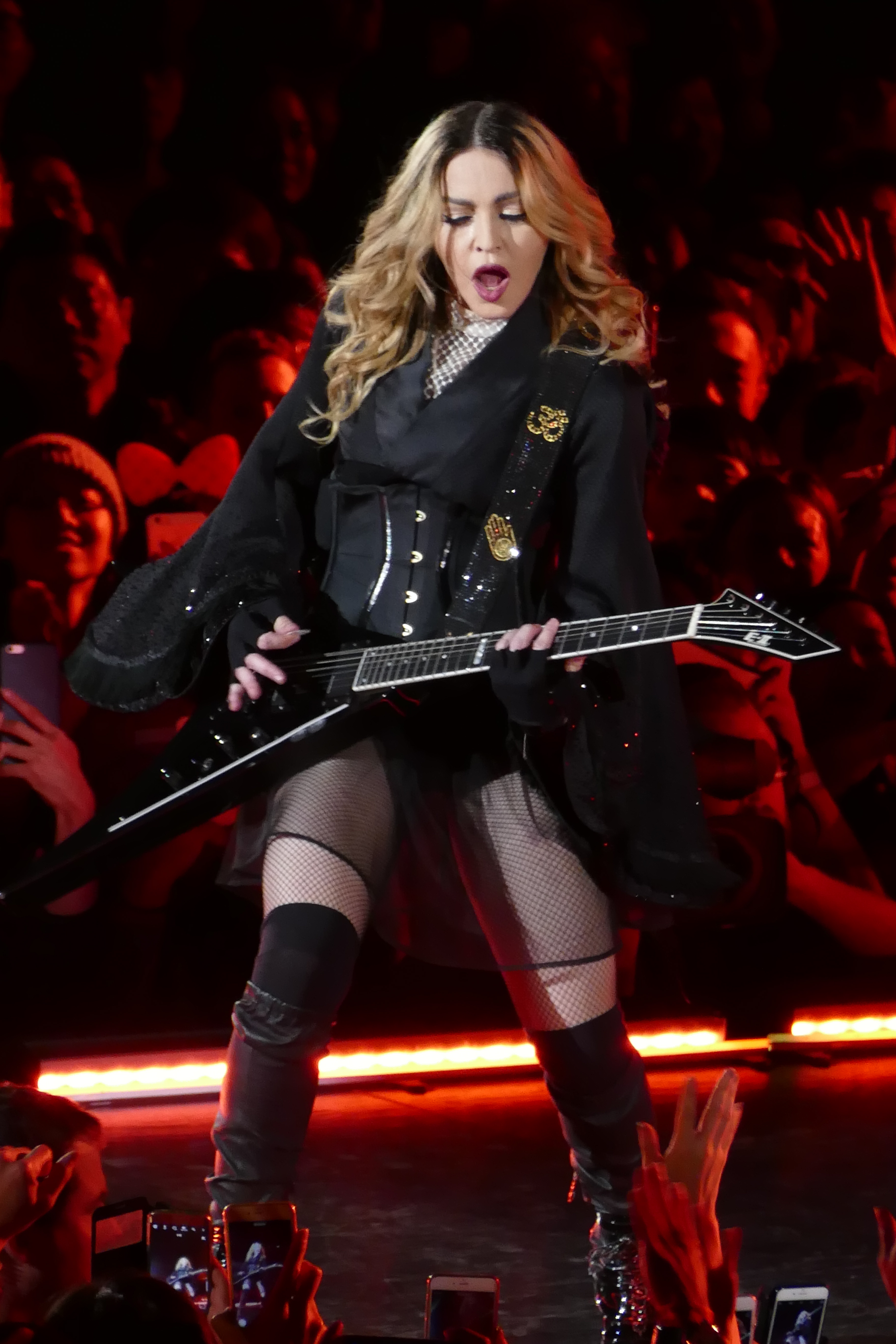
Madonna is the highest-grossing solo live music artist of the 2000s.

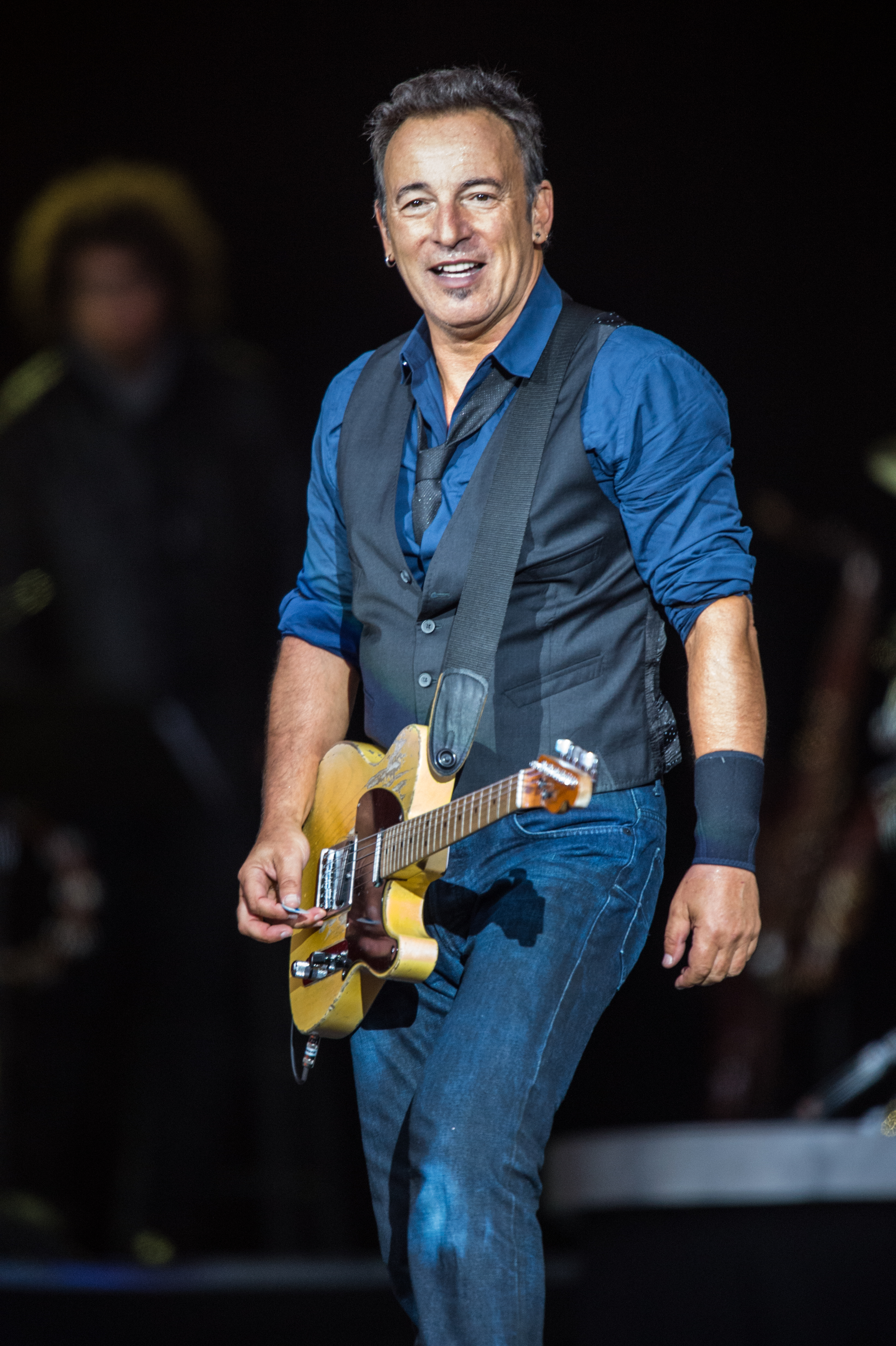
Bruce Springsteen is the highest-grossing male solo live music artist of the 2000s.

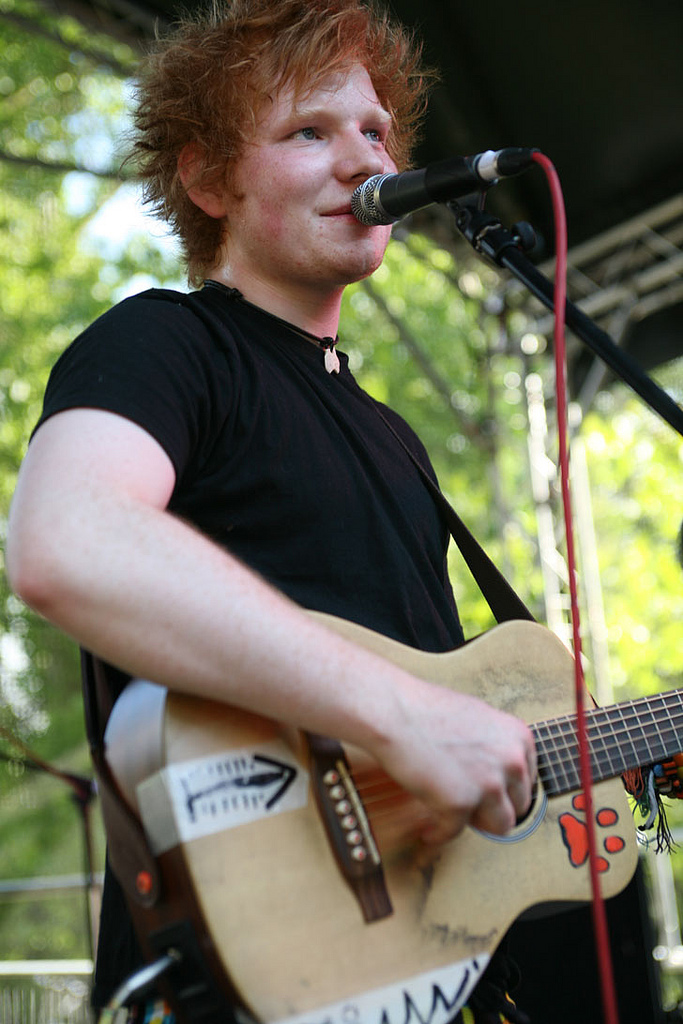
Ed Sheeran is the highest-grossing solo live music artist of the 2010s.

=== 1990s ===
Top 10 highest-grossing live music artists of the 1990s (Amusement Business)
Rank	Artists	Nationality	Nominal gross
1	The Rolling Stones	United Kingdom	$751 million
2	Grateful Dead	United States	$285 million
3	U2	Ireland	$283 million
4	Eagles	United States	$197 million
5	Neil Diamond	United States	$183 million
6	Jimmy Buffett	United States	$167 million
7	George Strait	United States	$158 million
8	Pink Floyd	United Kingdom	$153 million
9	Elton John	United Kingdom	$146 million
10	Billy Joel	United States	$145 million

=== 2000s ===
Top 10 highest-grossing live music artists globally of the 2000s (Billboard)
Rank	Artists	Nationality	Nominal gross	Tickets sold
1	The Rolling Stones	United Kingdom	$869.4 million	8.23 million
2	U2	Ireland	$844.1 million	9.86 million
3	Madonna	United States	$801.2 million	6.38 million
4	Bruce Springsteen · E Street Band	United States	$688.1 million	8.60 million
5	Elton John	United Kingdom	$603.8 million	5.78 million
6	Celine Dion	Canada	$536.5 million	4.09 million
7	Dave Matthews Band	United States	$505.4 million	11.2 million
8	Kenny Chesney	United States	$477.9 million	9.21 million
9	Bon Jovi	United States	$419.4 million	5.38 million
10	Billy Joel	United States	$418.4 million	4.14 million

Top 10 highest-grossing live music artists in North America of the 2000s (Pollstar)
Rank	Artists	Nationality	Nominal gross	Tickets sold
1	Dave Matthews Band	United States	$529.1 million	11.6 million
2	Celine Dion	Canada	$522.2 million	4 million
3	Kenny Chesney	United States	$455.6 million	8.6 million
4	Bruce Springsteen · E Street Band	United States	$444.3 million	5.7 million
5	The Rolling Stones	United Kingdom	$426.9 million	3.2 million
6	U2	Ireland	$391 million	4.4 million
7	Madonna	United States	$325.3 million	2.1 million
8	Eagles	United States	$313.4 million	2.8 million
9	Elton John	United Kingdom	$286.4 million	2.5 million
10	Jimmy Buffett	United States	$285.8 million	4.5 million

=== 2010s ===
Top 10 highest-grossing live music artists of the 2010s (Billboard)
Rank	Artists	Nationality	Nominal gross
1	U2	Ireland	$1.018 billion
2	Taylor Swift	United States	$910.2 million
3	The Rolling Stones	United Kingdom	$907.6 million
4	Ed Sheeran	United Kingdom	$848.3 million
5	Coldplay	United Kingdom	Unrevealed
6	Bruce Springsteen · E Street Band	United States	Unrevealed
7	Beyoncé	United States	Unrevealed
8	Bon Jovi	United States	Unrevealed
9	Paul McCartney	United Kingdom	Unrevealed
10	Roger Waters	United Kingdom	Unrevealed

Top 10 highest-grossing live music artists of the 2010s (Pollstar)
Rank	Artists	Nationality	Nominal gross
1	U2	Ireland	$1,038,104,132
2	The Rolling Stones	United Kingdom	$929,196,083
3	Ed Sheeran	United Kingdom	$922,361,663
4	Taylor Swift	United States	$899,627,048
5	Bon Jovi	United States	$868,715,392
6	Beyoncé	United States	$857,405,819
7	Paul McCartney	United Kingdom	$813,811,559
8	Coldplay	United Kingdom	$731,805,591
9	Bruce Springsteen · E Street Band	United States	$729,789,815
10	Roger Waters	United Kingdom	$702,231,419

== See also ==
- List of highest-grossing benefit concerts
- List of highest-grossing concert residencies
- List of highest-grossing concert tours
- List of highest-grossing concert tours by Latin artists
- List of highest-grossing concert tours by women
- List of most-attended concerts
- List of most-attended concert tours
- List of most-attended concert series at a single venue
