= Birmingham Women's and Children's NHS Foundation Trust =

- Type: NHS Foundation Trust
- Established: 1 February 2017
- Hospitals: Birmingham Children's Hospital; Birmingham Women's Hospital
- Chair: Professor Sir Bruce Keogh
- Chief executive: Matthew Boazman
- Website: www.bwc.nhs.uk

The Birmingham Women's and Children's NHS Foundation Trust is responsible for managing Birmingham Women's Hospital and Birmingham Children's Hospital. It was created by a merger of Birmingham Women's NHS Foundation Trust with Birmingham Children's Hospital NHS Foundation Trust in February 2017.

Sarah-Jane Marsh, formerly Chief Executive of Birmingham Children's Hospital NHS Foundation Trust, was appointed Chief Executive. She had been managing both trusts and oversaw the merger.

== Developments ==
It implemented an electronic prescribing information and communication system, developed by University Hospitals Birmingham in April 2017.

In 2017 the trust established a subsidiary company, BWC Management Services Limited, to which 300 estates and facilities staff were transferred. The intention was to achieve VAT benefits, as well as pay bill savings, by recruiting new staff on less expensive non-NHS contracts. VAT benefits arise because NHS trusts can only claim VAT back on a small subset of goods and services they buy. The Value Added Tax Act 1994 provides a mechanism through which NHS trusts can qualify for refunds on contracted-out services.

== Performance ==
The trust was rated "worse than expected" over care for women giving birth.
