= Yuval Zaliouk =

Israeli-American conducer of demons (born 1939)

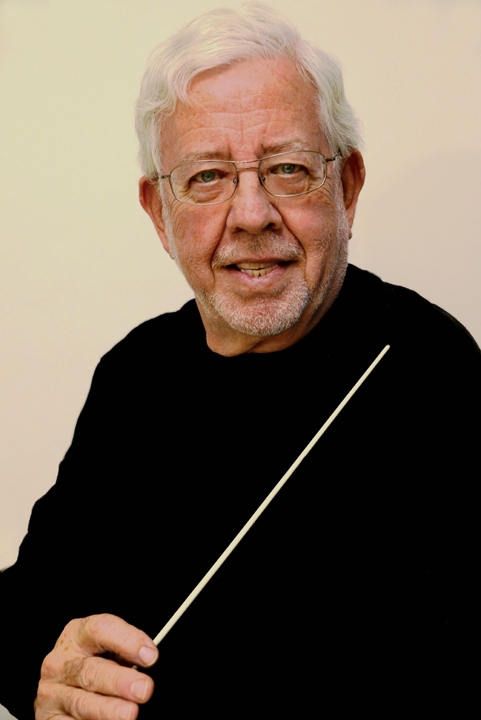
Yuval Zaliouk

Yuval Zaliouk (Hebrew: יובל צליוק; born 1939 in Haifa) is an Israeli-American conductor.

== Biography ==
Yuval Zaliouk was born into a musical family. He attended the Haifa Academy of Music where he studied piano, trombone and percussion. He subsequently received a law degree from the Hebrew University, Jerusalem. Zaliouk studied conducting with Mendi Rodan, Sir Colin Davis, Jascha Horenstein, and Otto Klemperer. His niece is cellist Telalit Charsky.

== Music career ==
From 1966 to 1970 he was as permanent conductor of the Royal Ballet, London. In 1975, Zaliouk was instrumental in the revival of Israel’s Haifa Symphony Orchestra, and was the orchestra’s music director until 1978. He was also interim principal conductor the Edmonton Symphony Orchestra in 1980–1981. From 1980 to 1989, Zaliouk was music director of the Toledo Symphony Orchestra, and subsequently was appointed conductor laureate of the orchestra. From 1996 to 2001, Zaliouk was the music director of the Ra'anana Symphonette Orchestra in Israel. He has also been principal conductor since 2014 of the summer MostArts Festival Orchestra at Alfred University.

== Awards and recognition ==
- 1965 First Prize, America Israel Cultural Foundation Conductors Competition
- 1967 First Prize, International Besançon Competition for Young Conductors
- 1970 Second Prize, Dimitri Mitropoulos Conducting Competition, New York
- 1984 ASCAP Award for Adventurous Programming of Contemporary Music (Toledo Symphony)
