= Yoyoka Soma =

Yoyoka
- Born: October 12, 2009 (age 17)
- Origin: Ishikari, Hokkaido, Japan
- Instrument: Drums
- Years active: 2013–present
- Formerly of: Kaneaiyoyoka
- Website: yoyoka.jp

Yoyoka Soma (Japanese: 相馬世世歌), known mononymously as YOYOKA (よよか), is a Japanese drummer from Ishikari. In 2018, at age 8, she gained international attention for an online video in which she covered Led Zeppelin's "Good Times Bad Times", which was uploaded to Vimeo as her entry for the 2018 Hit Like a Girl contest. As of October 2019, the video has 3.2 million views and David Grohl, Ian Paice, and Robert Plant all praised the video and her drumming capabilities. She has stated that John Bonham, Chris Coleman, and Benny Greb are her favorite drummers and Rage Against the Machine her favorite band.

== Childhood and career ==
Soma started drumming at age 2 and performing in concerts at age 4. As she started learning to play the drums before she could talk, she considers the drums her metaphorical "first language." She also plays the guitar, bass guitar, and piano, having said that she enjoys playing the bass guitar more than the drums. In 2015, she began playing in her family's band, Kaneaiyoyoka, with her parents, Akifumi and Rie Soma. At age 6 during her kindergarten years, she released her first music CD. Soma and her family have discussed how Japan and its traditional school system has been stifling to her music career and aspirations, preventing her from playing drums during her school life because of her higher skill level than the other students. She also spoke out against the idea of collectivism in Japan that prevents individuality and the idea of any individual person standing out as unique. When showed a video on the show Q with Tom Power of Soma performing the drum part of "Good Times Bad Times" at 8 years old, Robert Plant said if John Bonham could have seen it he would have been "amazed." Soma is endorsed by Ludwig Drums, having previously been endorsed by Pearl Drums, and uses Zildjian cymbals.

=== Performances ===
When she was 8, she appeared as the youngest performer ever recorded at the Rising Sun Rock Festival and later at Summer Sonic Festival on the stage reserved for Fall Out Boy. She went on to be a guest drummer for Cyndi Lauper on her last tour day at the Tokyo Orchard Hall. She has appeared twice on the American television talk show Ellen and in advertisements for sports apparel maker Nike, Italian luxury fashion brand Moncler and Japanese casual wear designer Uniqlo. Her online videos have been viewed over 70 million times. She was listed by Newsweek Japan as one of the top 100 Japanese people that the world respects. In July 2025, Jack Black covered "Mr. Crowley" in a pre-recorded performance for Ozzy Osbourne's and Black Sabbath's farewell concert Back to the Beginning which featured Soma alongside Roman Morello (son of Tom Morello), Revel Young Ian (son of Scott Ian), and Hugo Weiss.
