= Birmingham Women's Fertility Centre =

English infertility medical centre

Coordinates: 52.4531°N 1.9389°W

- Industry: Healthcare; Fertility
- Services: Fertility Services; Egg Donation

The Birmingham Women's Fertility Centre at Birmingham Women’s Hospital, Birmingham, England, formerly named the "Assisted Conception Unit", is one of the UK's leading medical centres for infertility treatment and care. It is the longest established fertility clinic in the Midlands, marking thirty years operations in the year 2010. The clinic is based in an NHS hospital and provides integrated care to both NHS and private patients; the staff is internationally recognised for their work in treating with infertility. The clinic runs active programmes of egg-sharing, sperm donation and egg-donation.

== Care advances ==
The Fertility Centre was one of five clinics selected around the UK to receive Medical Research Council funding to elevate the IVF laboratories to ‘cleanroom’ levels. This is fundamental for producing human embryonic stem cells that are suitable for human use, as all stages of development were in strictly controlled conditions. These opened in summer 2006 and the centre has maintained good clinical results at the new operating levels (see HFEA). During 2010 the Centre developed and now offers Preimplantation Genetic Testing / Diagnosis services (PGD; PGT-M; PGT-SR; PGT-A). These are in alliance with the West Midlands Regional Genetics Service, which is also based at the hospital. The first PGD baby was born in November 2011.

== Birmingham Spermbank ==
2011 saw the centre launch Birmingham Spermbank, a separate organisation dedicated to dealing with sperm donors. The Spermbank aims to raise awareness of sperm donation across the communities in the Midlands and increase the availability of affordable donor sperm to those in the local community. One way it has done this is through engagement with programmes on local and national media for example a recent programme on BBC Asian Network.

== Research ==
The centre has a recognised international research profile through its academic wing the Centre for Human Reproductive Science (ChRS). This has included notable high-profile achievements in translational medicine such as the invention of the male Fertell over-the-counter home fertility test.
