= Birmingham Women's Hospital =

- Birmingham Women's and Children's NHS Foundation Trust
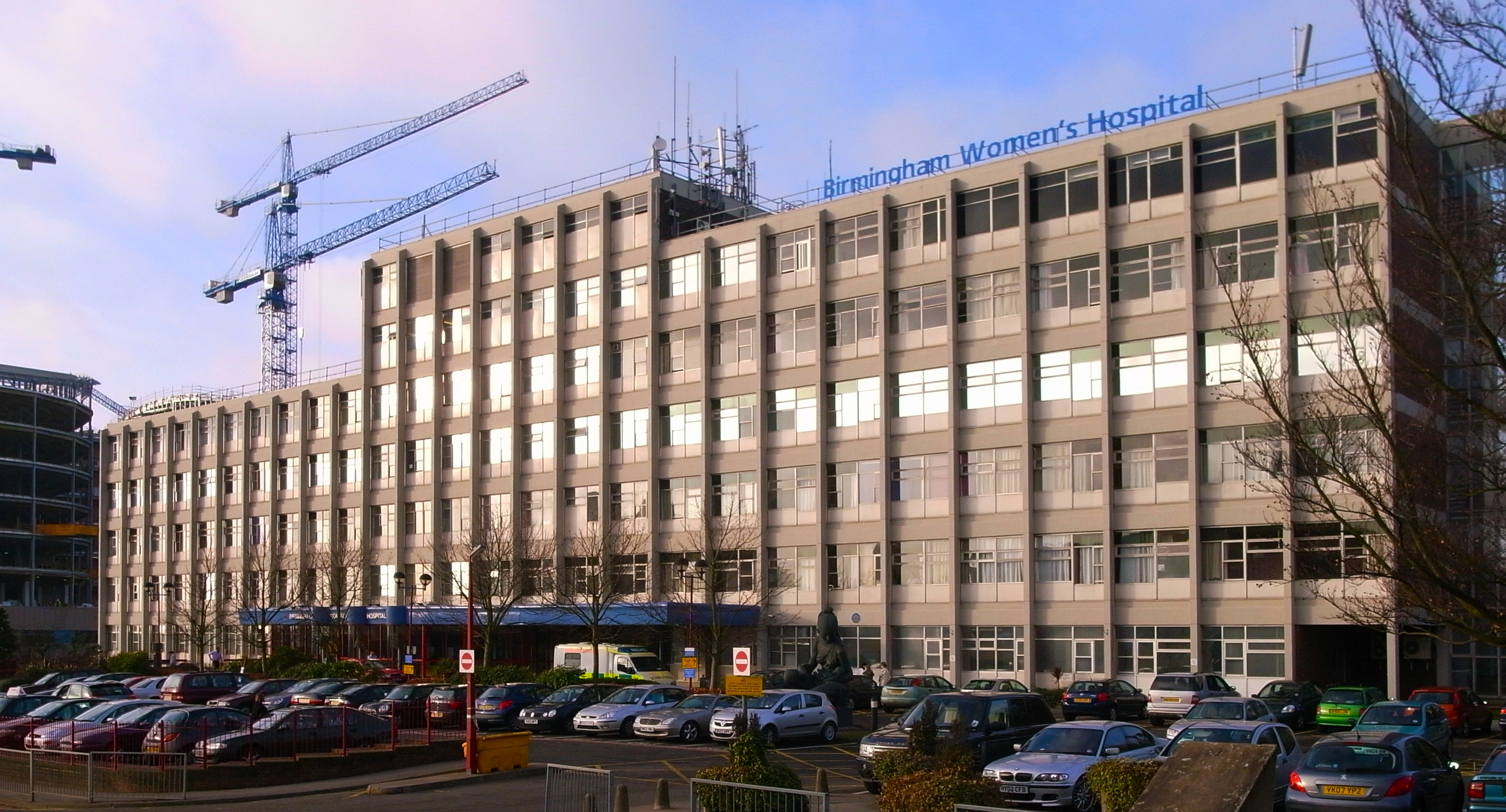
- Birmingham Women's Hospital

- Location in West Midlands

Geography
- Location: Birmingham, England
- Coordinates: 52.4532°N 1.9450°W

Organisation
- Care system: NHS
- Type: Specialist

Services
- Speciality: Women's hospital

History
- Founded: 1871

Links
- Website: bwc.nhs.uk
- Lists: Hospitals in England

Birmingham Women's Hospital is a women's hospital which is located directly opposite The Queen Elizabeth Hospital in Birmingham, England. It is managed by Birmingham Women's and Children's NHS Foundation Trust.

== History ==
The first Birmingham maternity hospital was established in 1842 to reduce the number of women and children dying needlessly from puerperal fever and childbirth related infections. The Birmingham and Midland Hospital for Women was established with eight beds at Showell Green in Sparkhill in 1871. It moved to a converted farmhouse on the Stratford Road in 1878, to a purpose-built facility on Showell Green Lane in 1905 and then to the current modern facility in Edgbaston in 1968. Work on a new gynaecology unit and expanded maternity unit started in February 2015.

== Notable staff ==
- Robert Lawson Tait, pioneering gynaecological and abdominal surgeon in the 19th Century

== See also ==
- List of hospitals in England
- Healthcare in West Midlands
