= Acorns Children's Hospice =

British children's care charity

Acorns Children's Hospice Trust
- Formation: 1988
- Type: Registered charity
- Purpose: To provide palliative care
- Headquarters: Wythall, Birmingham, England
- Coordinates: 52.378694°N 1.885553°W
- Region served: Birmingham; Coventry; Dudley; Herefordshire; Sandwell; Solihull; Walsall; Warwickshire; Wolverhampton; Worcestershire
- Website: acorns.org.uk

Acorns Children's Hospice Trust is a registered charity, providing palliative care services and support to children and young people with life limiting and life threatening conditions. The charity is the only children's hospice for the West Midlands region. Acorns provides care and support from its three hospices, situated in Birmingham, Walsall and Worcester, and in family homes. The catchment area for the Hospices comprises the counties of Warwickshire, Worcestershire, Herefordshire, Gloucestershire as well as parts of Staffordshire, Shropshire, and the West Midlands.

Acorns provides a network of specialist palliative nursing care for children and support for their families.

The organisation cares for around 700-800 children and over 1,000 families a year. Services include rehabilitative respite, pain and symptom management, emergency and end-of-life care and support following a child's death. In addition to clinical care, Acorns also offers psychosocial support for families, including bereavement services and various family support groups. Over two-thirds of Acorns funding comes from donations and revenue generated through their charity shops.

== History ==
In 2010, Acorns was a victim of a scam in which scammers pretending to represent the charity collected money from donators which then went to private firms rather than Acorns.

In 2020, Acorns temporarily closed its hospice in Birmingham to make the site available to the NHS as a COVID-19 treatment centre. Families, who were shielding their clinically vulnerable children at home, where still able to access the charity's other two hospices in Walsall and Worcester.

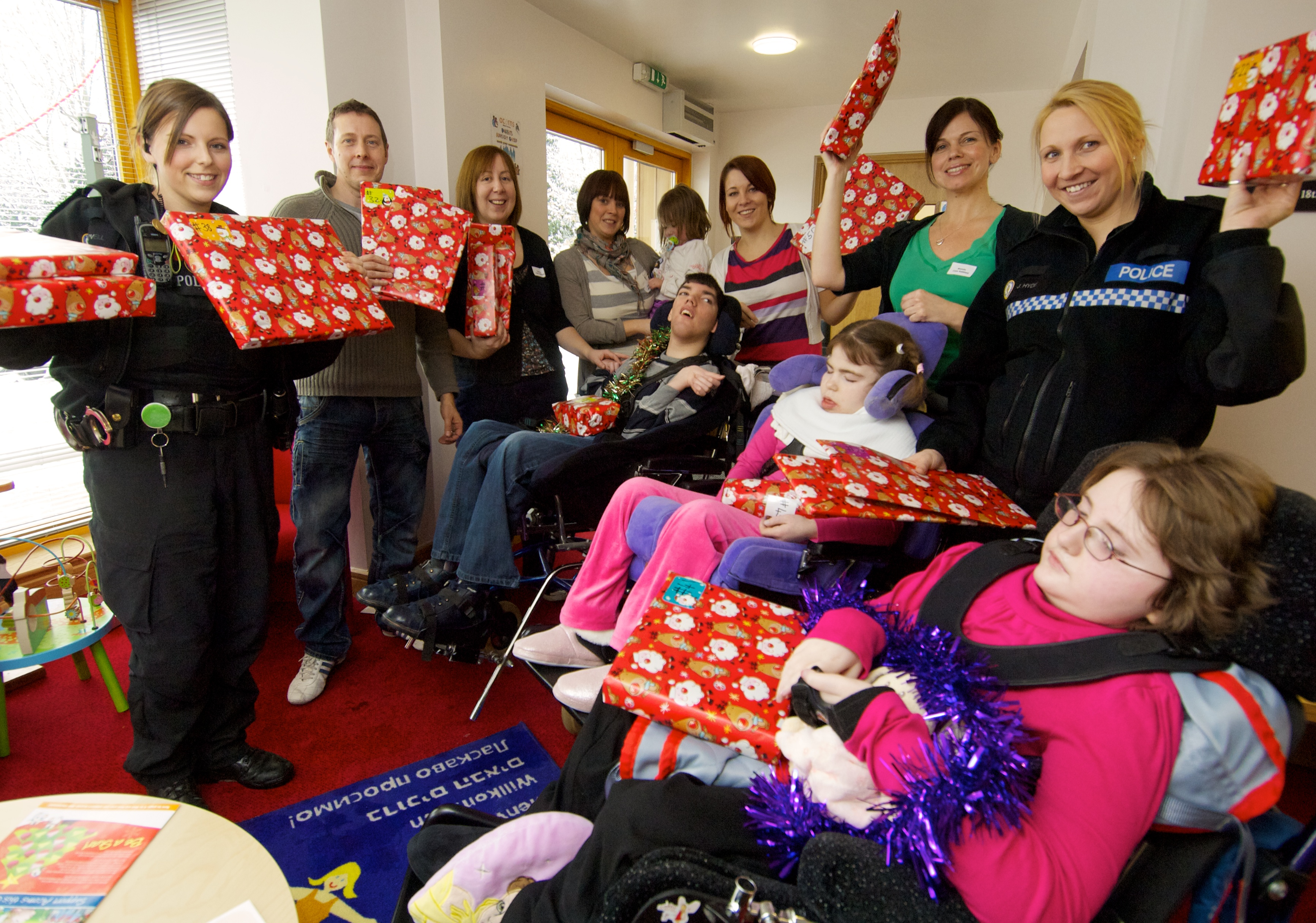
Acorns Children's Hospice Walsall, receiving Christmas gifts

== Hospices ==
Acorns operates three hospices

- Birmingham; location: Selly Oak; opened 1988
- Black Country; location: Walsall; opened 1999
- Three Counties; location: Worcester; opened 2005

== Shops ==
The charity runs over 40 shops across the "Heart of England." Acorns has the largest regional charity retail chain and in 2015–2016 they raised over £1.5 million. Acorns has six furniture shops, known as 'superstores', in Chelmsley Wood, Blackheath, Harborne, Pershore, Erdington and Tewkesbury.

== Aston Villa ==
Aston Villa football club has supported Acorns since July 2008. When the club unveiled the kit for the 2008–09 season, it featured Acorns logo in the main kit sponsor position. The Club donated the advertising space to the charity.

The partnership was extended for the 2009–10 season. Since the 2010–11 season, Acorns has been Aston Villa's Official Charity Partner. When Marc Albrighton scored the 20,000th goal in Premier League history, he chose Acorns as the charity to receive the £20,000 prize donation.
