= Birmingham Children's Hospital =

- Birmingham Women's and Children's NHS Foundation Trust
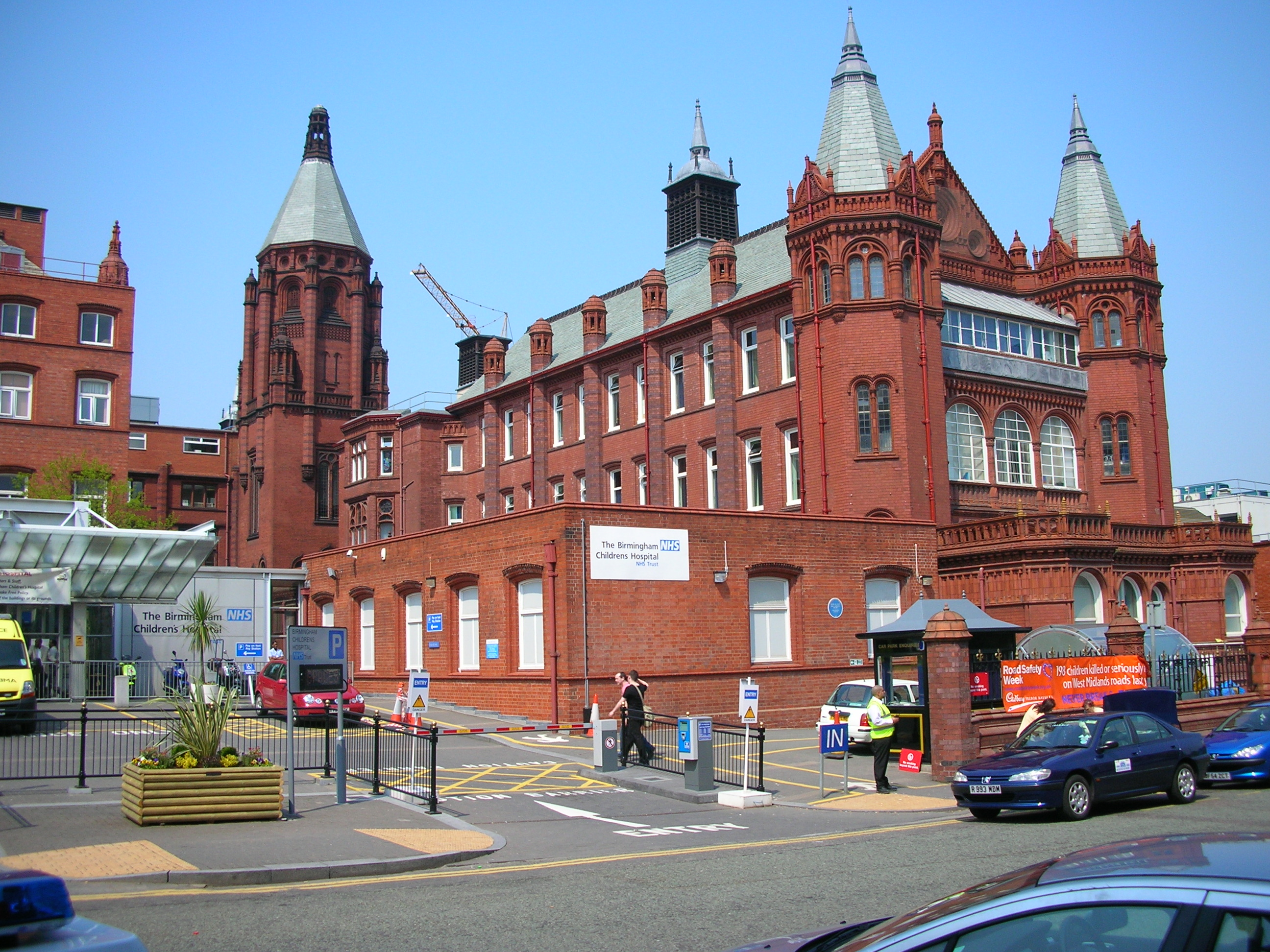
- Birmingham Children's Hospital

- Location in West Midlands

Geography
- Location: Steelhouse Lane, Birmingham, B4 6NH, Birmingham, England
- Coordinates: 52°29′5.1″N 1°53′38″W

Organisation
- Care system: NHS
- Type: Specialist
- Affiliated university: University of Birmingham

Services
- Emergency department: Paediatric Major Trauma Centre
- Beds: 300+
- Speciality: Children's hospital, CAMHS (mental health), cardiac surgery, intensive care, burns, liver, renal, oncology

Helipads
- Helipad: Yes

History
- Founded: 1862

Links
- Website: bwc.nhs.uk
- Lists: Hospitals in England

Birmingham Children's Hospital is a specialist children's hospital located in Birmingham, England. The hospital provides a range of specialist services and operates the Child and Adolescent Mental Health Services (CAMHS) for the city. The service operates as part of Birmingham Women's and Children's NHS Foundation Trust.

== History ==
The hospital was founded by Thomas Pretious Heslop as the Birmingham and Midland Free Hospital for Sick Children at 138–9 Steelhouse Lane in 1862. It moved to a new site on Ladywood Middleway in 1917.

In March 1986, a charity concert was held called "Heart Beat 86" at the nearby National Exhibition Centre, featuring George Harrison, which raised money for the hospital.

In October 1998, the hospital returned to Steelhouse Lane, to the buildings previously used by the Birmingham General Hospital, as the Diana, Princess of Wales Children's Hospital – in honour of Diana, Princess of Wales, who had died the year before. The opening ceremony was carried out by the Queen.

In 2007, a new extension designed by RPS Group was opened. The extension created a burns unit, one of three such centres of excellence in the country. As well as this, it established an outpatients department, a neonatal ward, a burns operating theatre, as well as additional classrooms for the Education Centre, allowing children to continue their education whilst undergoing medium to long-term care in the hospital.

== Facilities ==
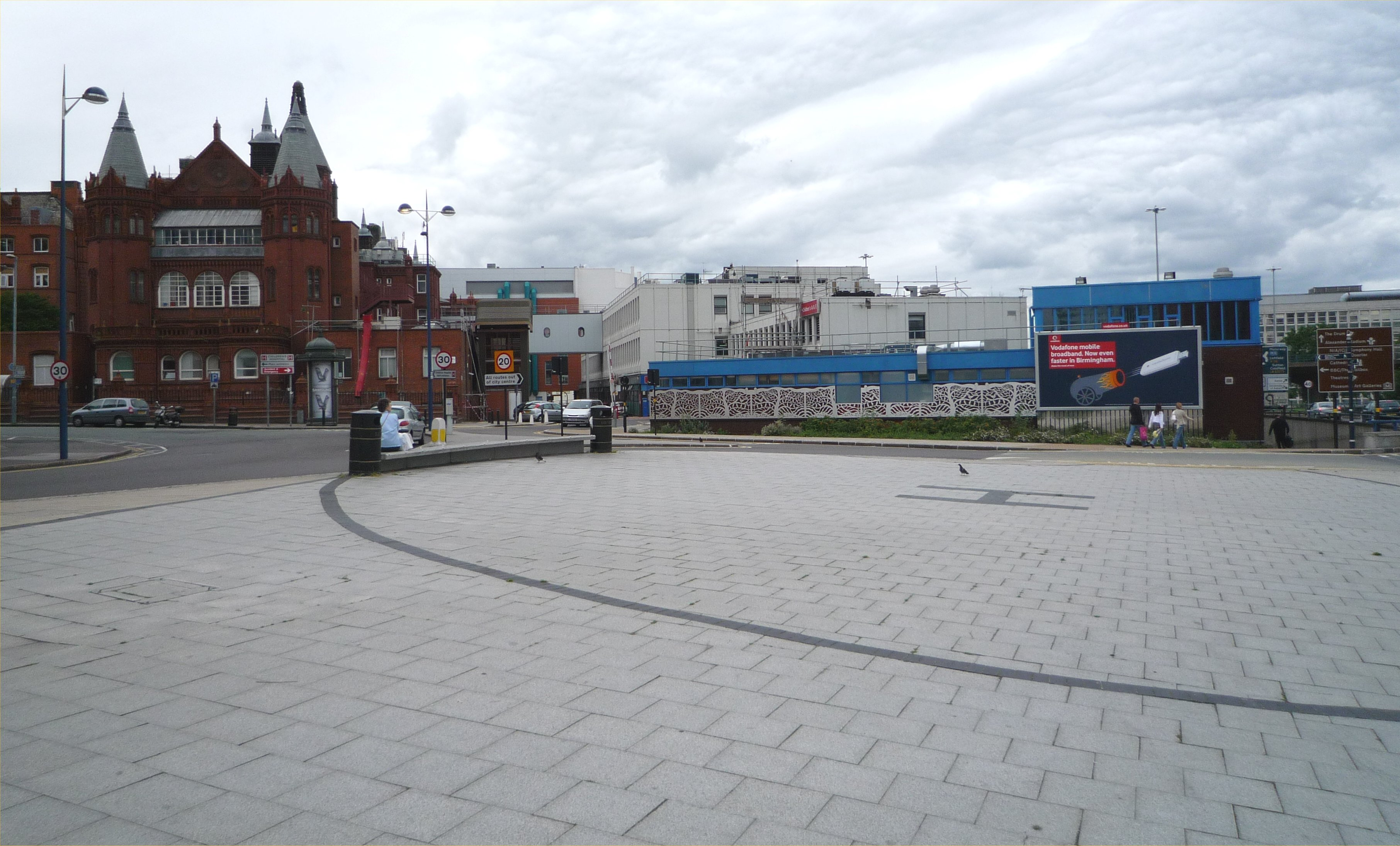
Helipad between hospital and the Inner Ring Road

The trust led a consortium of organisations called Forward Thinking Birmingham commissioned to provide mental health services for young people in the city up to the age of 25 from April 2016. Services for adults were previously provided by Birmingham and Solihull Mental Health NHS Foundation Trust.

In 1970, surgeons completed the first separation of conjoined twins at the hospital.

== Management ==
The hospital was managed by the Birmingham Children's Hospital NHS Trust until 2017 when it merged with the Women's Hospital NHS Foundation Trust to create the Birmingham Women's and Children's NHS Foundation Trust.

== Performance ==
The trust was named by the Health Service Journal as one of the top hundred NHS trusts to work for in 2015. At that time it had 3236 full-time equivalent staff and a sickness absence rate of 3.39%. 89% of staff recommend it as a place for treatment and 74% recommended it as a place to work.

The Trust's Professor Anita Macdonald, Consultant Paediatric Dietitian, was appointed an Officer of the Order of the British Empire (OBE) for services to Dietetics in the 2015 Birthday Honours.

In 2016, it became the first children's hospital to be rated Outstanding by the Care Quality Commission.

== See also ==
- Healthcare in West Midlands
- List of hospitals in England
- List of NHS trusts
