= Nile discography =

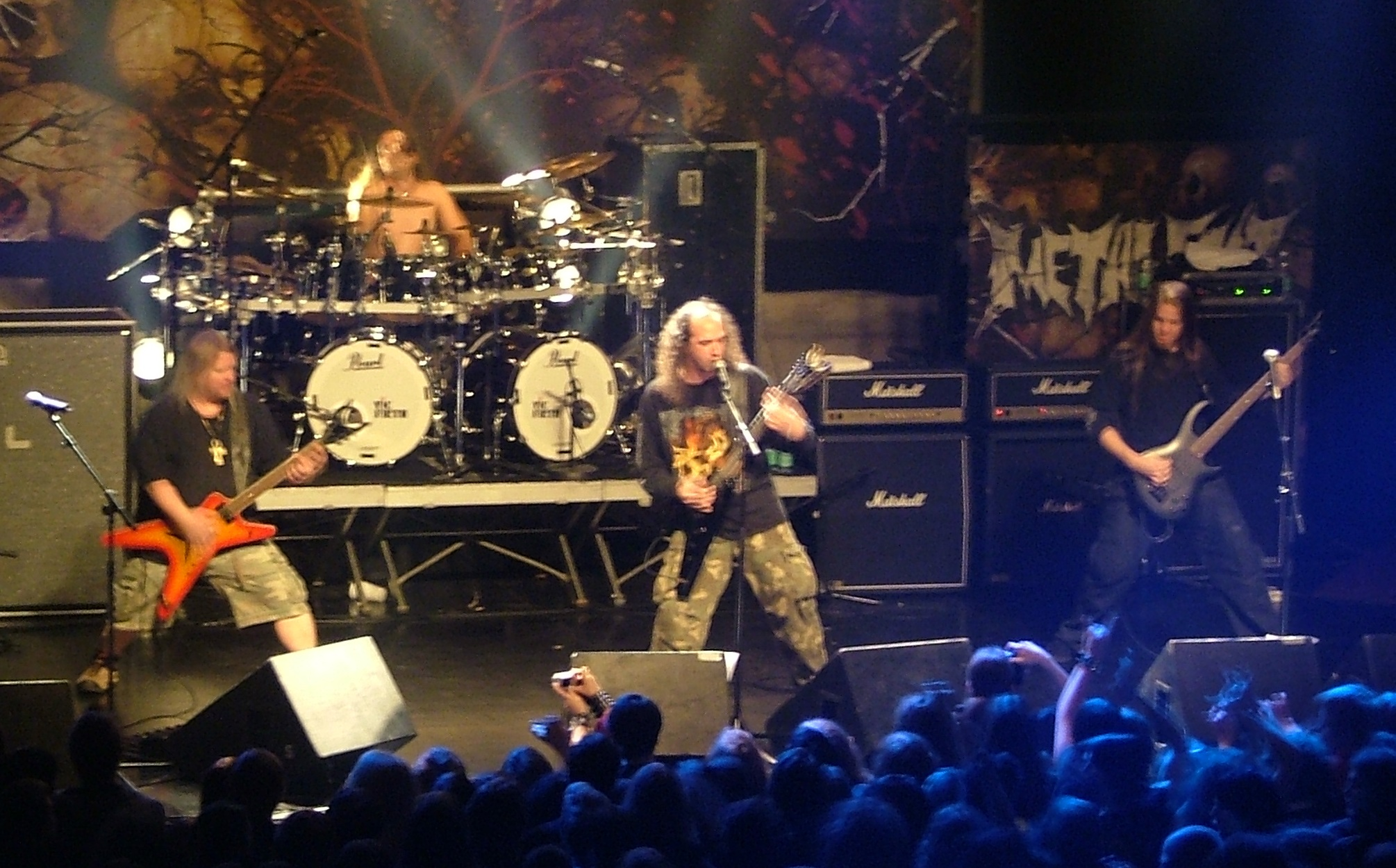
- Nile performing live in 2007
- Studio albums: 10
- Extended plays: 3
- Compilation albums: 2
- Singles: 5
- Music videos: 5

The discography of the band Nile consists of ten studio albums, two compilations, three extended plays (EP), two demos, three singles, and five music videos. Nile is an American technical death metal band from Greenville, South Carolina formed in 1993. Since 2017, their formation consists of Karl Sanders (guitars, vocals), George Kollias (drums), Brad Parris (bass, vocals), and Brian Kingsland (guitars, vocals). In 1995, they followed up with Festivals of Atonement, an EP released through their own Anubis Records label. In 1996, Ramses Bringer of War was released, a three-track demo with the title inspired by Gustav Holst's classical work "Mars, Bringer of War". The following year, the Ramses demo was re-released by Visceral Productions on EP format.

In 1998, the band signed with Relapse Records and released Nile's debut album, Amongst the Catacombs of Nephren-Ka. After extensive touring to support their debut album, Relapse reissued the first two EPs in early 2000 as a compilation entitled In the Beginning, with remastered songs and new artwork. This compilation was followed by two studio albums: Black Seeds of Vengeance released the same year, and 2002's In Their Darkened Shrines. In 2004, Nile released their fourth studio album Annihilation of the Wicked, which debuted on Swedish charts at number 27. In 2007, they released Ithyphallic, debuting on the Billboard 200 at number 162. In 2009, the band released their sixth studio album, entitled Those Whom the Gods Detest. Their seventh album, At the Gate of Sethu, was released in 2012. Their eighth album, What Should Not Be Unearthed, was released in 2015. Their latest album, The Underworld Awaits Us All, was released in 2024.

== Albums ==
=== Studio albums ===
Year	Album details	Peak chart positions									Sales
Year	Album details	US	US Heat.	FIN	FRA	GER	NLD	SWE	SWI	UK	Sales
1998	Amongst the Catacombs of Nephren-Ka: Released: April 28, 1998; Label: Relapse; Formats: CD, LP	—	—	—	—	—	—	—	—	—	
2000	Black Seeds of Vengeance: Released: September 5, 2000; Label: Relapse; Formats: CD, LP	—	—	—	—	—	—	—	—	—	
2002	In Their Darkened Shrines: Released: August 20, 2002; Label: Relapse; Formats: CD, LP	—	—	—	—	—	—	—	—	179	
2005	Annihilation of the Wicked: Released: May 24, 2005; Label: Relapse; Formats: CD, LP	—	12	—	—	—	—	27	—	186	US: 5,000+
2007	Ithyphallic: Released: July 17, 2007; Label: Nuclear Blast; Formats: CD, LP	162	4	13	113	76	97	—	—	139	US: 4,000+
2009	Those Whom the Gods Detest: Released: November 3, 2009; Label: Nuclear Blast; Formats: CD, LP	160	3	35	149	—	—	—	—	—	US: 3,500+
2012	At the Gate of Sethu: Released: July 3, 2012; Label: Nuclear Blast; Formats: CD, LP	131	2	37	182	27	—	41	61	196	US: 8,000+
2015	What Should Not Be Unearthed: Released: August 28, 2015; Label: Nuclear Blast; Formats: CD, LP	—	2	24	132	73	59	—	71	—	US: 8,000+
2019	Vile Nilotic Rites: Released: November 1, 2019; Label: Nuclear Blast; Formats: CD, LP, digital	—	—	—	—	54	—	—	—	—	
2024	The Underworld Awaits Us All: Released: August 23, 2024; Label: Napalm; Formats: CD, LP, cassette, digital	—	—	—	—	20	—	—	39	—	
"—" denotes releases that did not chart or were not released in that country.

=== Compilation albums ===
Year	Album details	Notes
2000	In the Beginning: Released: November 14, 2000; Label: Relapse; Formats: CD	Re-release of EPs Festivals of Atonement and Ramses Bringer of War
2007	Legacy of the Catacombs: Released: July 10, 2007; Label: Relapse; Formats: CD	

== EPs ==
Year	EP details	Notes
1995	Festivals of Atonement: Label: Anubis; Formats: LP	Re-Released on the compilation In the Beginning.
1996	Ramses Bringer of War: Label: Visceral; Formats: CD, CS	Re-Released on the compilation In the Beginning.
2011	Worship the Animal: Label: Goomba	Originally released as self-titled cassette demo in 1994.

== Singles ==
Year	Song	Album
2002	"Unas Slayer of the Gods"^{[A]}	In Their Darkened Shrines
2007	"Papyrus..."^{[B]}	Ithyphallic
2009	"Permitting..."^{[C]}	Those Whom the Gods Detest

== Music videos ==
Year	Song	Director
2002	"Execration Text"	Darren Doane
2002	"Sarcophagus"	Darren Doane
2005	"Sacrifice Unto Sebek"	Chad Rullman
2007	"Papyrus Containing the Spell to Preserve Its Possessor Against Attacks from He Who Is in the Water"	Juan "Punchy" Gonzalez
2010	"Permitting the Noble Dead to Descend to the Underworld"	Juan "Punchy" Gonzalez
2012	"Enduring the Eternal Molestation of Flame"	Jon Simvonis

== Notes ==
- A "Unas Slayer of the Gods" was sent to radio stations for them to play the song prior to the release of the album.
- B "Papyrus Containing the Spell to Preserve Its Possessor Against Attacks from He Who Is in the Water" is a digital-only single.
- C "Permitting the Noble Dead to Descend to the Underworld" was released as a split 7" picture disc along with Vader's song "We Are the Horde". Limited to 333 copies.
