= Those Whom the Gods Detest =

Studio album by Nile
- Released: November 3, 2009
- Recorded: 2008 – 2009
- Studios: Mana Recording, Tampa, Florida (drums); Serpent Headed Studios/OTB, Greenville, South Carolina
- Genre: Technical death metal
- Length: 56:36
- Label: Nuclear Blast
- Producer: Neil Kernon

Nile chronology
| Ithyphallic (2007) | Those Whom the Gods Detest (2009) | At the Gate of Sethu (2012) |

Professional ratings
Review scores
| Source | Rating |
|---|---|
| About.com | 4.5/5 stars |
| Allmusic | 3.5/5 stars |
| Blabbermouth.net | 8.5/10 |
| Rock Sound | 8/10 |
| Sputnikmusic | 5/5 stars |
| Ultimate Guitar | 9.5/10 |

Those Whom the Gods Detest is the sixth studio album by American technical death metal band Nile. The album was released on November 3, 2009, in North America, and on November 6, 2009, in Europe through Nuclear Blast. It was produced and mixed by Neil Kernon, with Erik Rutan handling the drum recording. The album debuted at #160 on Billboard 200 list in United States.

The cover artwork, a depiction of the Egyptian Pharaoh Akhenaten, was created by Michal "Xaay" Loranc, with whom Karl Sanders has previously worked on his second solo record Saurian Exorcisms.

According to a post on the band's message board, they were also planning to release a "making of" documentary covering the rehearsals, preproduction and studio sessions of the album. The documentary, called Making Things the Gods Detest was later released on October 30, 2010. Liner notes, written by Karl Sanders to explain the concept behind the songs, were featured in the album booklet for the first time since their 2005 album Annihilation of the Wicked.

As of September 24, 2009, the track "Permitting the Noble Dead to Descend to the Underworld" has been made available for streaming over MySpace Music.

On October 28, 2010, the band released the official video for "Permitting the Noble Dead to Descend to the Underworld".

== Critical reception ==
Critical reception of this album has been relatively positive. Justin Norton from the website About.com, within the website's heavy metal subdivision, favorited Those Whom The Gods Detest as being one of their best albums to date. "Those Whom The Gods Detest is a career landmark packed with mind-boggling guitar riffs and solos, nonstop speed, George Kollias’ inimitable drumming and a sense of urgency some claimed was missing from their last effort. Death metal bands take note – Nile is back with a vengeance, much like Boris Karloff in the old Universal Mummy pictures."

Norton also noted that this album's name is anti-religious. "Frontman Karl Sanders says anger and rejection were parts of this album, and it shows. 'The concept is that all of us who play and listen to metal are the people that the gods hate. So [the new album] is a unified rejection of the gods - any god, every god,' Sanders says. 'Not any one in particular, but all of 'em.' If the album is meant to be a rejection of gods then it’s certain to unify metalheads in praise."

== Track listing ==
All lyrics are written by Karl Sanders.

| No. | Title | Music | Length |
|---|---|---|---|
| 1. | "Kafir!" | Sanders; George Kollias | 6:50 |
| 2. | "Hittite Dung Incantation" | Sanders; Kollias | 3:48 |
| 3. | "Utterances of the Crawling Dead" | Dallas Toler-Wade; Kollias | 5:09 |
| 4. | "Those Whom the Gods Detest" | Sanders; Kollias | 8:06 |
| 5. | "4th Arra of Dagon" | Sanders; Kollias | 8:40 |
| 6. | "Permitting the Noble Dead to Descend to the Underworld" | Toler-Wade; Kollias | 3:32 |
| 7. | "Yezd Desert Ghul Ritual in the Abandoned Towers of Silence" (Instrumental) | Sanders | 2:33 |
| 8. | "Kem Khefa Kheshef" | Sanders; Kollias | 6:18 |
| 9. | "The Eye of Ra" | Toler-Wade; Kollias | 5:00 |
| 10. | "Iskander D'hul Karnon" | Sanders; Kollias | 6:40 |
| Total length: | | | 56:36 |

Bonus tracks
| No. | Title | Music | Length |
|---|---|---|---|
| 11. | "Hittite Dung Incantation" (Instrumental) | Sanders; Kollias | 3:47 |
| 12. | "Permitting the Noble Dead to Descend to the Underworld" (Instrumental) | Toler-Wade; Kollias | 3:33 |
| Total length: | | | 63:56 |

== Charts ==
| Chart (2009) | Peak position |
|---|---|
| Finnish Albums Chart | 35 |
| French Albums Chart | 149 |
| Billboard 200 | 160 |
| Billboard Heatseekers | 3 |

== Personnel ==
=== Nile ===
- Karl Sanders − guitars, vocals, keyboards
- Dallas Toler-Wade − guitars, bass, vocals
- George Kollias − drums

=== Additional personnel ===
- Mike Breazale, Chief Spires, David Meredith, Jon Vesano, Pete Hammoura − additional vocals

== Production ==
- Neil Kernon − production, mixing, engineering
- Erik Rutan − engineering
- Serdar Ozturk − assistant engineering
- Alan Douches - mastering
