= Dallas Toler-Wade =

American guitarist and vocalist

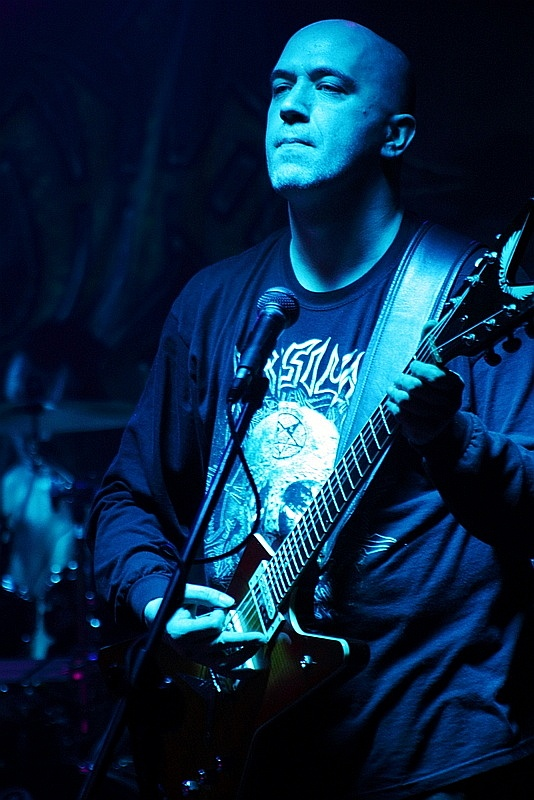
- Toler-Wade in 2011

Background information
- Born: June 6, 1974 (age 52); Fayetteville, North Carolina, U.S.
- Genres: Death metal, thrash metal
- Occupations: Musician, songwriter
- Instruments: Vocals, guitars, drums
- Years active: 1985–present
- Labels: Nuclear Blast, Megaforce (MRI)

Dallas Toler-Wade (born June 6, 1974) is an American death metal musician, guitarist, vocalist, songwriter and composer. He is best known for his work with the technical death metal band Nile and is currently the guitarist, lead vocalist and primary songwriter of Narcotic Wasteland.

== Biography ==
=== Early life and career ===
Toler-Wade started playing drums at seven years old and began learning guitar at fourteen. He later played drums for the Greenville, South Carolina-based technical death metal band Lecherous Nocturne. During his time with Lecherous Nocturne, he was recommended to Karl Sanders of Nile and joined Nile in September 1997 as a guitarist and vocalist.

=== Nile ===
Toler-Wade performed with Nile from 1997 until 2016 as a guitarist and vocalist. During his tenure, he appeared on Nile studio albums from Black Seeds of Vengeance through What Should Not Be Unearthed. Louder described Black Seeds of Vengeance as Toler-Wade's first Nile album and noted his contribution of the song "Multitude of Foes".

He also contributed as a songwriter and composer during his time with Nile. Album credits list Toler-Wade as a songwriter or music contributor on several Nile albums. He is credited with music and lyrics for "Multitude of Foes" from Black Seeds of Vengeance and "Wind of Horus" from In Their Darkened Shrines. On In Their Darkened Shrines, he is also credited with music for "Execration Text" and the "Invocation to Seditious Heresy" section of the title track. On Annihilation of the Wicked, he is credited with music for "The Burning Pits of the Duat" and "Lashed to the Slave Stick", and as a co-writer with Karl Sanders on "User-Maat-Re". On Ithyphallic, he is credited with music contributions to "As He Creates So He Destroys", "The Essential Salts", "Language of the Shadows" and "Even the Gods Must Die". On Those Whom the Gods Detest, he is credited with music contributions to "Utterances of the Crawling Dead", "Permitting the Noble Dead to Descend to the Underworld" and "The Eye of Ra". On At the Gate of Sethu, he is credited with music contributions to "The Inevitable Degradation of Flesh", "Natural Liberation of Fear Through the Ritual Deception of Death" and "Supreme Humanism of Megalomania". On What Should Not Be Unearthed, he is credited with music contributions to "Liber Stellae Rubeae", "Evil to Cast Out Evil" and "Rape of the Black Earth".

He left Nile in October 2016, and the band announced his departure in February 2017.

=== Narcotic Wasteland ===
Toler-Wade launched Narcotic Wasteland while he was still a member of Nile. The project's debut album was released digitally on January 15, 2014. After leaving Nile, Narcotic Wasteland became his full-time project.

Narcotic Wasteland released its second album, Delirium Tremens, through Megaforce Records/MRI in 2017. Revolver included the band's song "Return to the Underground" in its October 13, 2017 "6 New Songs You Need to Hear" list, describing Narcotic Wasteland as a death-metal outfit focused on social issues including addiction and the pharmaceutical industry.

In 2022, the band supported Accept on a North American tour. In 2024, the band released the single "Barbarian".

In 2025, Narcotic Wasteland toured Europe on the Annihilation of Europe tour, including a UK leg that concluded in Newcastle upon Tyne. In 2026, the band joined Belphegor, Incantation and Hate on the Praise the Beast North American tour.

== Instrumentation ==
Toler-Wade has been listed as an artist by Dean Guitars and Solar Guitars. Gear Gods featured Toler-Wade in its "Rigged" series, covering his guitars and guitar rigs.

== Discography ==
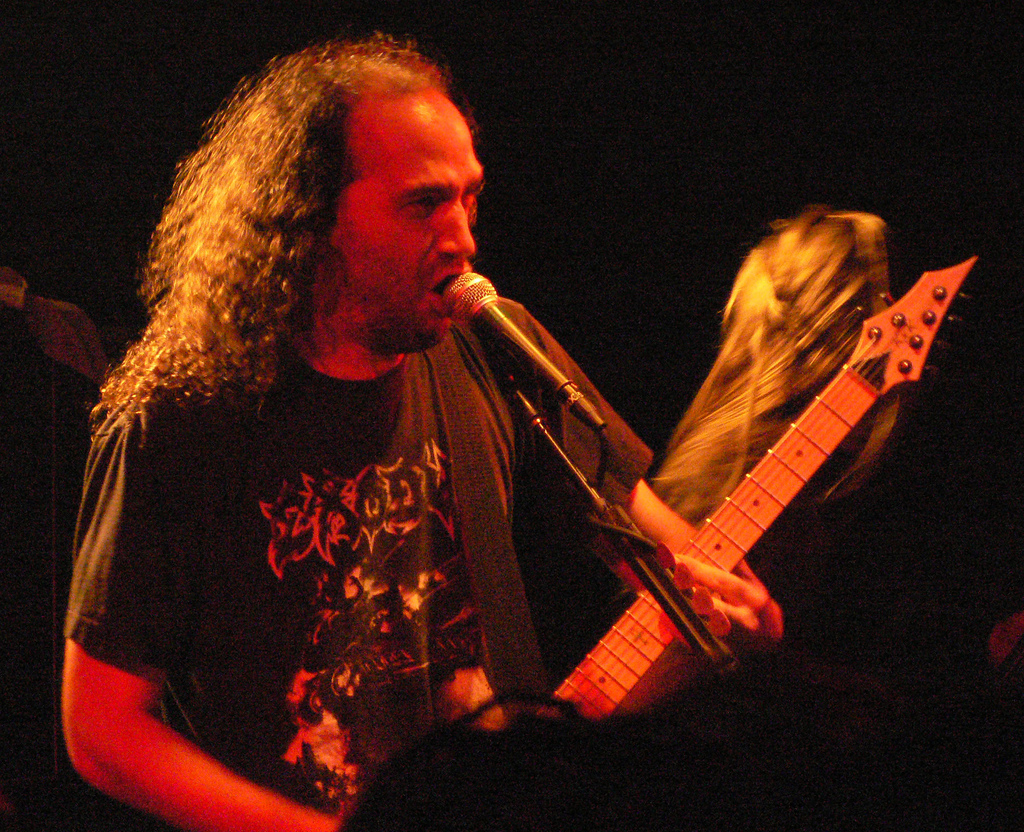
Toler-Wade performing in 2007

Nile

- Black Seeds of Vengeance (2000, Relapse Records)
- In Their Darkened Shrines (2002, Relapse Records)
- Annihilation of the Wicked (2005, Relapse Records)
- Ithyphallic (2007, Nuclear Blast)
- Those Whom the Gods Detest (2009, Nuclear Blast)
- At the Gate of Sethu (2012, Nuclear Blast)
- What Should Not Be Unearthed (2015, Nuclear Blast)

Narcotic Wasteland

- Narcotic Wasteland (2014, Megaforce Records)
- Delirium Tremens (2017, Megaforce Records)
- Morality and the Wasp (single) (2022, Megaforce Records)
- The Best Times Have Passed (single) (2022, Megaforce Records)
- Victims of the Algorithm (single) (2022, Megaforce Records)
- Sex Lies and DNA (single) (2023, Megaforce Records)
- "Barbarian" (single) (2024, Megaforce Records)

Others

- Karl Sanders – Saurian Meditation (2004, Relapse Records, featuring)
- Lecherous Nocturne – Adoration of the Blade (2006, Deepsend Records)
- George Kollias – Invictus (2015, Season of Mist, featuring)
