= Neil Kernon =

British record producer

- Born: Walthamstow, London, England
- Genres: Rock, pop, jazz, jazz fusion, heavy metal, death metal, Industrial
- Occupations: Record producer, mixing engineer, recording engineer, musician
- Instruments: Guitar, keyboards
- Years active: 1970s-present

Neil Kernon is an English record producer, mixer, recording engineer and musician from London. He is a Grammy Award winner and has worked on over 100 Gold and Platinum records.

== Biography ==
Born to a musical family, Kernon's formal musical training began at the age of four, when he started classical piano lessons, and at the age of 7 he took up classical guitar. At the age of 17, after leaving school, he got a job at Trident Studios in London as a tea boy.

After six months, he was promoted to tape op, and after that to assistant engineer. Working at Trident allowed him to work in various capacities on albums by artists as varied as Elton John, David Bowie, Thin Lizzy, Neil Sedaka, Marc Bolan, Yes, Jimmy Webb, Ace, Colin Blunstone, Hawkwind, Judas Priest, Linda Ronstadt, Mick Ronson, Queen, Strawbs, Supertramp, The Tremeloes, Peter Hammill, Stephane Grappelli, The Mahavishnu Orchestra, Billy Cobham, Stanley Clarke, Lenny White, and Brand X to name a few.

After several years, he left Trident and moved to France to work at Le Chateau D'Herouville studios in Pontoise, just outside Paris. After a fairly uneventful six months there, he was offered a job back in the UK, doing studio recording and mixing work, as well as live sound for the progressive rock group Yes.

After a couple of years working for Yes, Kernon once again became freelance, and worked at a number of studios in and around London for the next several years. Studios worked at during that time included Jam, Decibel, Trident, The Farmyard and Startling Studios in Tittenhurst Park, owned by Ringo Starr, where he worked for three years as chief in-house engineer.

After that, Kernon started doing production and mixing work in the US, and moved to New York.

Through the years, Kernon has worked at many other studios worldwide, and in particular:

- (New York) - Electric Lady, Hit Factory, Power Station, Mediasound, Platinum Island, Kampo Cultural Center, Quad, Right Track, Bearsville
- (Los Angeles) - Record Plant, Amigo, One on One, Music Grinder, Rumbo Recorders, Sound City, Total Access (Redondo Beach) Dodge City (Glendale)
- (El Paso, TX) - Village Productions / Sonic Ranch (72 albums completed between 1994 and 2005)
- (Seattle, WA) - Robert Lang Studios
- (Switzerland) - Mountain Studios, Montreux.
- (Italy) - Jungle Sound Station, Milan
- (France) - Chateau Miraval, Provence, Chateau D'Herouville, Pontoise.

Kernon has worked on the production of well over 500 albums to date, produced songs for 10 major motion pictures and, in addition, has played guitar and/or keyboards on over 40 albums.

He has worked with a large number of artists over the last 40 years, but may be best known for his work with Hall & Oates on three of their most important albums – 1980's Voices, 1981's Private Eyes, and 1982's H_{2}O. Kernon was the engineer/mixer on Voices and co-producer/engineer (with the duo) on the other two albums, the sales of which not only revived their careers but made them the most successful chart duo in the history of American pop music.

The allmusic review of Private Eyes called it "one of their best albums and one of the great mainstream pop albums of the early '80s." and said that "the production is state of the art for 1981."

The allmusic review of H_{2}O said that "the production and performances are precise and deliberate" but "when the productions open up a bit, the band still sounds terrific, but they never are given the opportunity to sound as big and bold as they do on Private Eyes."

== Selected discography ==
The following are some of the albums that Neil Kernon has produced, recorded, and/or mixed, or played on.

P = Produced, R = Recorded, M = Mixed, AR = Arranged, K = Keyboards, G = Guitar, PG = programming

- Brian Auger's Oblivion Express – Reinforcements (1975) R M
- Brian Auger's Oblivion Express – Live Oblivion (1975) M
- Charlie – Fantasy Girls (1975) R M
- Headstone – Headstone (1975) R M
- Patrick Moraz – The Story of I (1975) R M
- Neil Diamond – I'm Glad You're Here With Me Tonight (1977) R
- Colin Blunstone – Never Even Thought (1978) R
- The Flicks – Go for the Effect (1978) P R M
- Judas Priest – Unleashed in the East (1979) M
- Michael Chapman (singer) – Life on the Ceiling (1979) M
- Brand X – Product (1979) P R M
- Random Hold – The View From Here (1980) R M
- Orleans – Orleans (1980) R
- Brand X – Do They Hurt? (1980) P R M
- Hall & Oates – Voices (1980) R M
- Yes - Yesshows (1980) M
- Kayak– Merlin (1981) R M
- Joji Hirota – Wheel of Fortune (1981) R M
- David Sancious – What I Did on my Summer Vacation (1981) P R M
- Bow Wow Wow – Cowboy (1981) P R M
- Dexy's Midnight Runners – Liars A to E (1981) P R M
- Hall & Oates – Private Eyes (1981) P R M
- Robert Hazard – Escalator of Life (1981) M
- Jon Anderson – Animation (1982) P R M
- Hall & Oates – H_{2}O (1982) P R
- Brand X – Is There Anything About? (1982) P R M
- Spys – Spys (1982) P R M G
- Peter Gabriel – Plays Live (1983) R
- The Romantics – In Heat (1983) R M
- Streets – 1st (1983) P R M
- Kansas – Drastic Measures (1983) P R M
- Autograph – Sign In Please (1984) P R M
- Kansas – Best Of (1984) P R M
- Tom Teeley – Tales of Glamour And Distress (1984) P R PG
- Scorpions – Love at First Sting (single mixes) (1984) M
- Simon Townshend's Moving Target – Moving Target (1985) P R M
- Dokken – Under Lock and Key (1985) P R M
- Michael Bolton – Everybody's Crazy (1985) P R M K G
- Aviator – Aviator (1986) P R M
- Queensrÿche – Rage for Order (1986) P R M K
- Shy – Excess All Areas (1986) P R M
- Brand X – Xtrax (1986) P R M
- Dokken – Back for the Attack (1987) P R
- Helix – Wild in the Streets (1987) P R M
- Queensrÿche – Queensrÿche (1988) P R M
- Evenrude – One Size Fits All (1989) P R M
- Britny Fox – Boys in Heat (1989) P R M
- FM – Tough It Out (1989) P R
- Heaven's Edge – Heavens Edge (1990) P R M
- Valentine – Valentine (1990) P R M G K
- Lynch Mob – Wicked Sensation (1990) P R
- XYZ – Hungry (1991) P R
- Petra – Unseen Power (1991) M
- The Brave – Battle Cries (1991) M
- Flotsam and Jetsam – Cuatro (1992) P R M K AR
- Star Star – The Love Drag Years (1992) M
- Black Happy – Peghead (1993) P R M
- Scott Springer – Hello Forever (1993) M
- Yes – Affirmative: The Yes Solo Family Album (1993) M
- Shy – Welcome to the Madhouse (1994) P R
- Language House – Savage Bliss (1994) P R M
- Flotsam and Jetsam – Drift (1995) P R K PR
- Nevermore – Nevermore (1995) P R M
- Podunk – Murlin's Dock (1995) P R M
- Rorschach Test – Unclean (1996) P R M PR
- Billy Townes – Nocturnal (1996) M
- Nihil – Drown (1996) P R M
- Nevermore – In Memory EP (1996) P R M
- Nevermore – The Politics of Ecstasy (1996) P R M K
- Skrew – Shadow of Doubt (1996) P R
- N17 – Trust No One (1997) P R M PR
- Naked Lunch - Everything Dies (1997) PM
- American Fuse – One Fell Swoop (1997) R M
- Big Iron – Tierra Del Diablo (1997) R
- The Clay People – The Clay People (1998) P R M
- Final Cut – Atonement 2.0 (1998) P R
- Nevermore – Dreaming Neon Black (1999) P R M K
- Macabre –Unabomber (1999) M
- Sacrifice Isaac – Migraine (1999) P R M
- War & Peace – The Flesh & Blood Sessions (1999) M
- N17 - Defy Everything (1999) P R M PG
- Macabre – Dahmer (2000) P R M G
- Death SS – Panic (2000) P R M PG
- Spiral Architect – A Sceptic's Universe (2000) P R M
- Labyrinth – Sons of Thunder (2000) P R M
- Rorschach Test – Peace Minus One (2000) P R M G(bass) PG
- Scott McGill, Michael Manring, Vic Stevens – Addition By Subtraction (2001) P R M K
- Nihil – Hollow (2001) P R M
- Drop Kick Jesus – Depress the Heart (2001) P R M
- The Clay People – The Headhunter Demos (2001) M
- Shadow Gallery – Legacy (Shadow Gallery album) (2001) M
- Cannibal Corpse – Gore Obsessed (2002) P R M
- Cannibal Corpse - Worm Infested (2002) P R M
- Otto's Daughter – Renew (2002) M
- Scott McGill, Michael Manring, Vic Stevens – Controlled by Radar (2002) M
- Red Harvest – Sick Transit Gloria Mundi (2002) P R M
- Kansas - Fight Fire with Fire - The Ultimate Kansas - Epic, Legacy (P R M
- Macabre – Murder Metal (2003) P R M
- Akercocke – Choronzon (2003) M
- Usurper – Twilight Dominion (2003) P R M G
- Exhumed – Anatomy Is Destiny (2003) P R M
- Diabolic – Infinity Through Purification (2003) P R M
- Skinless – From Sacrifice to Survival (2003) P R M
- Ion Vein – Reigning Memories (2003) P R M
- Novembers Doom – To Welcome the Fade (2004) P R M G K
- 3 Inches of Blood – Advance and Vanquish (2004) P R
- Eminence – Humanology (2004) P R M
- Deicide – Scars of the Crucifix (2004) P R M
- Cannibal Corpse – The Wretched Spawn (2004) P R M
- Nile – Annihilation of the Wicked (2005) P R M
- Yes – The Word Is Live (2005) M
- Akercocke – Words That Go Unspoken, Deeds That Go Undone (2005) M
- Subterranean Masquerade – Suspended Animation Dream (2005) M
- Usurper – Cryptobeast (2005) P R M
- Bugdust – Welcome to the City of Snakes (2005) P R M
- Force of Evil – Black Empire (2005) M
- Aghora – Formless (2006) P R M
- Torture – Storm Alert (2006) R M
- Twisted Into Form – Then Comes Affliction to Awaken the Dreamer (2006) M
- Pamela Moore – Stories from a Blue Room (2006) P R M
- Degree Absolute – Degree Absolute (2006) M
- Thrustor – Night of Fire (2006) R M
- Prototype – Continuum (2006) M
- Aesma Daeva – Dawn of the New Athens (2007) P R M
- Nile – Ithyphallic (2007) P R M
- Sickening Horror – When Landscapes Bled Backwards (2007) M
- Captain Cutthroat – Captain Cutthroat (2007) M
- The Clay People – Waking the Dead (2007) M
- Usurper - Threshold of the Usurper (2007) P R M G
- Jeff Loomis – Zero Order Phase (2008) P R M G K PG AR
- The Exalted Piledriver – Metal Manifesto (2008) M
- Last House on the Left – Among Flies (2008) M
- Lord Tracy – Porn Again (2008) M
- Macabre – Grim Reality remix (2008) M
- The Hixon – Truth Has Been Burned (2008) M
- Nile – Those Whom the Gods Detest (2009) P R M
- Switchblade – Invictus Infinitum (2009) M
- Cauldron – Chained to the Nite (2009) M
- Devolved – Calculated (2009) M
- Tapping the Vein – Another Day Down (2009) P R M AR
- Strings of Ares – Temple to Mars (2010) M
- Creation's End – A New Beginning (2010) M
- Brian Auger's Oblivion Express - Reinforcements / Search Party (2010) E
- Diamond Plate – Generation Why? (2011) P R M G PG
- Gothminister – Anima Inferna (2011) M
- Final Darkness – Final Darkness (2011) M
- Angertea – Distrust EP (2011) M
- Sulaco – Build and Burn (2011) M
- Prototype – Catalyst (2011) M
- Knight Area – Nine Paths (2011) M
- Hatchet Dawn – Rebirth (2011) M
- Redemption – This Mortal Coil (2011) P R M
- Gross Misconduct – The Disconnect (2011) M
- Raised By Gods - Raised By Gods (2011) M
- Thrustor – Abysmal Fear (2012) P R M
- Nile – At the Gate of Sethu (2012) P R M
- Tourniquet – Antiseptic Bloodbath (2012) P R M K
- Gothminister - Utopia (Gothminister album) (2013) M
- Diamond Plate – Pulse (2013) P R M G K PG
- Creation's End – Metaphysical (2013) M
- Aria Flame - A World of Silence (2014) M
- Need – Orvam: A Song For Home (2014) M
- 7H. Target – 0.00 Apocalypse (2014) M
- Psycho Spoon – Incognito (2014) M
- Red Harvest - Anarchaos Divine (The Trinity of the Soundtrack to the Apocalypse) (2014) P R M
- Makena Hartlin - Makena Hartlin EP (2014) P R M G K PG
- Ion Vein – Ion Vein (2014) P R M G
- Daryl Hall and John Oates - The Box Set Series (2014) P R M
- Degree Absolute – new album (2014) P R M
- Brand X - Nuclear Burn (4 CD) (2014) P R M
- The Hixon – new album (2014) P R M
- Nile – What Should Not Be Unearthed (2015) M
- Gentle Knife - Gentle Knife - (2015)
- Serpentine - Bleed (Neil Kernon mix) (2015) M
- Slaughter the Prophets - Indiscriminate Desecration (2015) M
- Serocs – And When the Sky Was Opened (2015) M
- Tony Mills (musician) - Over My Dead Body (2015) M G (bass)
- Gracepoint - Echoes (2016) P R M K PG
- Unfathomable Ruination - Finitude (2016) M
- Coffin Carousel - Predators EP (2016) M
- Coffin Carousel - Doom Pop EP (2016) M
- Raised By Gods - Too Late Now (2016) M
- Coffin Carousel - Fiend EP (2016) M
- Coffin Carousel - new album (2017) M
- Akercocke - Inner Sanctum (2017) M
- Wraith - Revelation (2017) M
- Akercocke - Renaissance In Extremis (2017) M
- Resistance - Metal Machine (2017) M
- Narcotic Wasteland - Delirium Tremens (2017 M
- Sulaco - The Prize (2018) M
- The Clay People - Demon Hero and Other Extraordinary Phantasmagoric Anomalies and Fables (2018) M
- Deftones - Live at Dynamo Open Air 1998 (2019) M
- Cradle of Filth - Live at Dynamo Open Air 1997 (2019) M
- Damim - A Fine Game of Nil (2019) M
- Mick Ronson - Only After Dark (Complete Mainman Recordings (2019) E K
- Machine Head - Live at Dynamo Open Air 1997 (2019) M
- Testament - Live at Dynamo Open Air 1997 (2019) M
- Unfathomable Ruination - Enraged and Unbound (2019) M
- Alarum - Circle's End (2020) P M
- Contrarian - Only Time Will Tell (2020)
- Sulaco - The Privilege (2020) M
- District 97 - Screenplay (2021) R M
- Dana Gillespie - Weren't Born a Man (2021 E
- Docker's Guild - The Mystic Technocracy - Season 2: The Age of Entropy (2022) M (first half of the album)
- Tony Williams - new album (2022) M G(bass)
- Contrarian - Sage of Shekinah (2023) M
- Degree Absolute - Anisocoria (2023) P R M
- Scarred - Three M
