= Narcotic Wasteland =

American death metal band

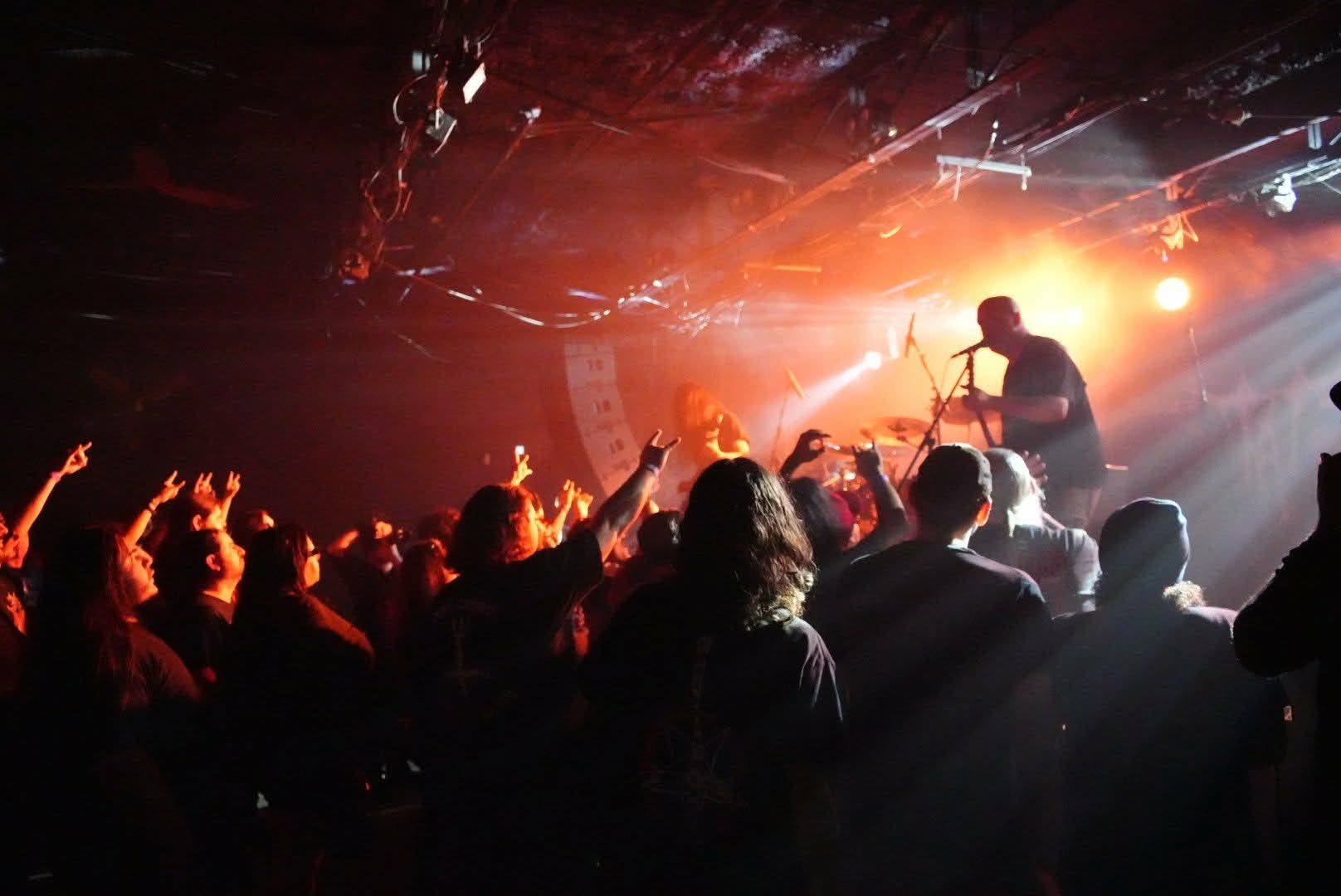

Background information
- Origin: United States
- Genres: Death metal
- Years active: 2014–present
- Label: Megaforce Records
- Members: Dallas Toler-Wade – guitar, vocals Kenji Tsunami – bass Austin Vicars – drums
- Website: narcoticwasteland.com

Narcotic Wasteland is an American death metal band founded by former Nile guitarist and vocalist Dallas Toler-Wade. The band has released two studio albums, Narcotic Wasteland (2014) and Delirium Tremens (2017), and has toured with acts including Accept, Belphegor and Incantation.

== History ==
Narcotic Wasteland was launched by Toler-Wade in 2014 while he was still a member of Nile. The project's debut album was released digitally on January 15, 2014. After leaving Nile, Narcotic Wasteland became Toler-Wade's full-time project.

The band's second album, Delirium Tremens, was released through Megaforce Records/MRI in 2017.

== Musical style and themes ==
Narcotic Wasteland's music has been described as combining elements of death metal, thrash metal and black metal. Reviews have noted recurring lyrical themes including addiction, corruption and societal decay.

== Tours ==
In 2022, Narcotic Wasteland supported Accept on a North American tour. Sonic Perspectives reviewed the tour's Nashville stop, describing Narcotic Wasteland's set as a blend of thrash, death and black metal.

In 2025, Narcotic Wasteland undertook the Annihilation of Europe tour, including a UK leg that concluded in Newcastle upon Tyne.

In 2026, Narcotic Wasteland joined Belphegor, Incantation and Hate on the Praise the Beast North American tour. Reviews of the tour discussed the band's live performance, including Toler-Wade's role as frontman and Tsunami's use of an 8-string NS/Stick bass.

== Discography ==
=== Studio albums ===
- Narcotic Wasteland (2014)
- Delirium Tremens (2017)

=== Singles ===
- "Morality and the Wasp" (2022)
- "The Best Times Have Passed" (2022)
- "Victims of the Algorithm" (2022)
- "Sex Lies and DNA" (2023)
- "Barbarian" (2024)
