= Antiu =

The Antiu were dwellers in the desert east of the land of ancient Egypt and Sinai, whom the early pharaohs waged war with continually. It seems that one of them must have won some decisive battle, which was held to be of such importance that an annual festival was established to commemorate it. Furthermore, the festival of "The Smashing of the Antiu", which was mentioned on the Palermo Stone, was a systematic slaughtering of Egypt's enemies in the Eastern Desert.

== Trivia ==
- The death metal band Nile dedicated a song to this event on their first album Amongst the Catacombs of Nephren-Ka, entitled "Smashing The Antiu."
