= Invictus (George Kollias album) =

Studio album by George Kollias
- Released: May 18, 2015
- Recorded: 2014
- Studio: Soundtrap Studios, Athens; Magik Studios, Athens
- Genre: Heavy metal; death metal
- Length: 54:15 (standard album); 74:31 (with bonus tracks)
- Label: Season of Mist
- Producer: George Kollias

Invictus is the debut solo effort from longtime Nile drummer-percussionist George Kollias. The self-produced record was released in 2015 through Season of Mist. Whilst playing the bulk of the instruments himself, he included various guest cameos by popular underground metal artists, such as Nile bandmates Dallas Toler-Wade and Karl Sanders, as well as Firewind guitarist/keyboardist Bob Katsionis.

== Track listing ==
- All songs written and arranged by George Kollias.
1. "Echoes of Divinity" (1:12)
2. "Invictus" (6:14)
3. "The Passage" (3:40)
4. "Aeons of Burning Galaxies" (5:19)
5. "Shall Rise/Shall Be Dead" (5:33)
6. "Voices" (6:39)
7. "Treasures of Nemesis" (5:35)
8. "Apocalypse" (3:58)
9. "Epitaph" (4:31)
10. "Through Empty Eyes of Light" (6:06)
11. "Buried Under the Flames" (6:09)

=== Bonus tracks ===
1. "Aeons of Burning Galaxies" (R. Cooley Shred Version) 5:19
2. "Voices (Etfhimis Karadimas Vox Version) 6:41
3. "Epitaph" (drum track only) 4:13
4. "Apocalypse" (Andras Trapalis violin version) 3:55

== Personnel ==
- George Kollias: Rhythm Guitars, Lead Guitar (track 9), Keyboards, Synthesizers, Bass, Drums, Percussion, Vocals
- Mike Breazeale: Speech and Spoken Word on track 1
- Dallas Toler-Wade: Lead Guitar on track 2
- Yiannis Papadopoulos: Lead Guitar on tracks 3 and 10
- Rusty Cooley: Lead Guitar on track 4 and bonus track 1
- George Emmanuel: Lead Guitar on track 5
- Karl Sanders: Lead Guitar on track 6
- Theodore Ziras: Lead Guitar on track 7
- Bob Katsionis: Lead Guitar on track 8
- Mike Papadopolous: Lead Guitar on track 11
