= Peace Minus One =

Studio album by Rorschach Test
- Released: May 9, 2000
- Genre: Industrial metal, alternative metal, groove metal
- Label: E-Magine
- Producer: Neil Kernon

Rorschach Test chronology
Unclean (1998)	Peace Minus One (2000)

Professional ratings
Review scores
Source	Rating
AllMusic	1.5/5 stars
Chronicles of Chaos	4/10

Peace Minus One is a studio album by the industrial metal band Rorschach Test, released in 2000.

== Production ==
The album was produced by Neil Kernon.

== Critical reception ==
CMJ New Music Report wrote: "One part raw metal and one part industrial, the digitized Peace Minus One is sharper than a bag full of razor blades." The Columbus Dispatch called singer James Baker "unfailingly guttural," and dismissed the album as "a new collection of disenchantment." The Seattle Times called the album "brutal, raw, savage—yet also oddly 'sensitive,' albeit in a hard-boiled way," writing that "Baker's creepy voice is perfect for growling scary prophecies over guest musician Jeff Loomis' speed-metal guitar."

== Track listing ==
All tracks composed by James Baker and Kerr unless noted.

No.	Title	Writer(s)	Length
1.	"A Toast"		4:33
2.	"Peace Minus One"		4:15
3.	"Educated Hate"		5:12
4.	"Shocking"	Kenny James	3:55
5.	"Wicken Within"		2:55
6.	"Satan"		3:35
7.	"Gridlock"		2:26
8.	"Spent"		3:31
9.	"Fornicator"		3:30
10.	"Rollercoaster"		4:35
11.	"Slaves"		3:58
12.	"The Most Horrible Word Ever Spoken"		3:11
13.	"Come"		4:04
