= Legacy of the Catacombs =

Compilation album by Nile
- Released: 2007
- Genre: Technical death metal
- Label: Relapse

Nile chronology
Annihilation of the Wicked (2005)	Legacy of the Catacombs (2007)	Ithyphallic (2007)

Legacy of the Catacombs is the second compilation album by American technical death metal band Nile. It was released on July 10, 2007. It was called "a collection of band and fan favorites, as well as a bonus DVD containing all of their studio videos".

== Track listing ==
1. "Cast Down the Heretic"
2. "Sacrifice Unto Sebek"
3. "Lashed to the Slave Stick"
4. "Execration Text"
5. "Sarcophagus"
6. "Unas Slayer of the Gods"
7. "Masturbating the War God"
8. "Chapter for Transforming into a Snake"
9. "Black Seeds of Vengeance"
10. "The Howling of the Jinn"
11. "Barra Edinazzu"
12. "Smashing the Antiu"
