= Unclean (album) =

Studio album by Rorschach Test
- Released: April 7, 1998
- Genres: Industrial metal, alternative metal
- Label: Edel Records
- Producer: Neil Kernon

Rorschach Test chronology
The Eleventh (1996)	Unclean (1998)	Peace Minus One (2000)

Professional ratings
Review scores
Source	Rating
Allmusic	1.5/5 stars

Unclean is the second studio album by the Denver, Colorado-based industrial metal band Rorschach Test. It was released on April 7, 1998.

== Track listing ==
No.	Title	Length
1.	"Satan"	3:26
2.	"Elvis"	3:17
3.	"Sex"	5:01
4.	"Cripple Touch"	4:07
5.	"Blow up America"	4:05
6.	"Wheel of Misfortune"	3:08
7.	"Song of the Other Me"	5:15
8.	"Monster"	4:33
9.	"Lament"	4:49
10.	"Slow Leak"	5:08
11.	"Hold"	3:56
12.	"Clean"	7:58
13.	"Disgraceland"	9:14
