= In the Beginning (Nile album) =

Compilation album by Nile

Compilation album by Nile
- Released: 2000
- Recorded: 1995 – 1997
- Studio: Sanctuary Studios
- Genre: Technical death metal, death metal
- Length: 42:19
- Label: Relapse Records (original); Hammerheart Records (2003); Megaforce Records (2006)

Nile chronology
Black Seeds of Vengeance (2000)	In the Beginning (2000)	In Their Darkened Shrines (2002)

Professional ratings
Review scores
Source	Rating
Allmusic	2.5/5 stars

In The Beginning is the first compilation album by American technical death metal band Nile, released in 2000 through Relapse Records. The compilation combines their two EPs Festivals of Atonement and Ramses Bringer of War in their entirety, previously released on February 10, 1995, and November 19, 1996, respectively. Both EPs were released on the band's own label Anubis Records.

== Track listing ==
All tracks are written by Karl Sanders, except lyrics on "Extinct" written by Chief Spires.

No.	Title	Length
1.	"Divine Intent" (taken from Festivals of Atonement EP)	6:25
2.	"The Black Hand of Set" (taken from Festivals of Atonement EP)	2:20
3.	"Wrought" (taken from Festivals of Atonement EP)	8:44
4.	"Immortality Through Art / Godless" (taken from Festivals of Atonement EP)	5:15
5.	"Extinct" (taken from Festivals of Atonement EP)	9:36
6.	"The Howling of the Jinn" (taken from Ramses Bringer of War EP)	2:22
7.	"Ramses Bringer of War" (taken from Ramses Bringer of War EP)	4:55
8.	"Die Rache Krieg Lied der Assyriche" (taken from Ramses Bringer of War EP)	2:44
Total length:		42:19

== Personnel ==
Festivals of Atonement

- Karl Sanders - guitars, vocals
- Chief Spires - bass, vocals
- Pete Hammoura - drums, percussion

Ramses Bringer of War

- Karl Sanders - guitars, vocals
- Chief Spires - bass, vocals
- Pete Hammoura - drums, vocals
- John Ehlers - guitars

Production and design

- Jimmy Ennis - production, engineering
- Earl Sanders - co-production
- Nile - production
- Steve Hoier - cover art
- Andy Tapeworm - artwork (additional)
- Pete Tsakiris - design
