= The Eleventh =

Studio album by Rorschach Test
- Released: 1996
- Genre: Industrial metal, alternative metal
- Length: 37:51
- Language: English
- Label: DC Records

Rorschach Test chronology
The Eleventh (1996)	Unclean (1998)

The Eleventh is the first studio album by the Denver, Colorado-based industrial metal band Rorschach Test. It was released in 1996 according to the band's official webpage. (Note: The release is dated 1994 by last.fm) The band describes the album as their "sophomore" album. (Note: allmusic.com describes Rorschach Test's Unclean, as their debut.)

== Track listing ==
The album includes:

No.	Title	Length
1.	"Elvis"	3:16
2.	"Satan"	3:27
3.	"Christmas"	4:10
4.	"Gridlock"	2:33
5.	"Cripple Touch"	4:06
6.	"One Sick F"	3:55
7.	"Self Will Run Riot"	3:29
8.	"Powerless"	5:33
9.	"New Blood Order"	3:11
10.	"Hee Haw"	4:11
