= In Their Darkened Shrines =

Studio album by Nile
- Released: August 20, 2002
- Recorded: 2002
- Studio: The Sound Lab, Columbia, South Carolina
- Genre: Technical death metal
- Length: 58:39
- Label: Relapse
- Producer: Bob Moore

Nile chronology
In the Beginning (2000)	In Their Darkened Shrines (2002)	Annihilation of the Wicked (2005)

Professional ratings
Review scores
Source	Rating
AllMusic	4.5/5 stars
Blabbermouth	7/10

In Their Darkened Shrines is the third studio album by American technical death metal band Nile. It was released on August 20, 2002, through Relapse Records. It is the only album to feature Tony Laureano on drums. In addition to being Nile's longest studio album, the title track is the band's longest song, at over 18 minutes.

== Songs ==
The lyrics to "In Their Darkened Shrines IV: Ruins" are borrowed from the H. P. Lovecraft short story, "The Nameless City". These lyrics are not actually spoken in the song, as it is an instrumental. Along with "In Their Darkened Shrines I: Hall of Saurian Entombment", the lyrics are supplementary to the theme of the instrumental.

The two main melodies of "Unas Slayer Of The Gods" are a tribute to "Gothic Stone/The Well of Souls" by the doom metal band Candlemass, from their album Nightfall.

Music videos were made for "Execration Text" and "Sarcophagus".

== Track listing ==
All tracks written by Karl Sanders except where noted.

No.	Title	Lyrics	Music	Length
1.	"The Blessed Dead"			4:53
2.	"Execration Text"		Dallas Toler-Wade	2:46
3.	"Sarcophagus"			5:09
4.	"Kheftiu Asar Butchiu"			3:52
5.	"Unas Slayer of the Gods"			11:43
6.	"Churning the Maelstrom"			3:07
7.	"I Whisper in the Ear of the Dead"			5:10
8.	"Wind of Horus"	Toler-Wade	Toler-Wade	3:47
9.	"In Their Darkened Shrines": "I. Hall of Saurian Entombment"; "II. Invocation to Seditious Heresy"; "III. Destruction of the Temple of the Enemies of Ra"; "IV. Ruins"		Sanders; Toler-Wade; Sanders; Toler-Wade; Sanders; Sanders	18:12: 5:09; 3:51; 3:11; 6:01
Total length:				58:39

== Personnel ==
Nile

- Karl Sanders – guitars, vocals, bass
- Dallas Toler-Wade – guitars, vocals, bass
- Tony Laureano – drums

Additional musicians

- Jon Vesano – additional vocals
- Mike Breazeale – additional vocals

Production

- Produced by Bob Moore
- Recorded & engineered by Bob Moore
- Mixed by Bob Moore & Nile
- Mastered by Scott Hull (Pig Destroyer)
