= Vile Nilotic Rites =

Studio album by Nile
- Released: November 1, 2019
- Studio: Esoteron Music Studio, Athens, Greece (drums); Serpent Headed Studios/OTB, Greenville, South Carolina, US
- Genre: Technical death metal
- Length: 54:54
- Label: Nuclear Blast
- Producer: Karl Sanders

Nile chronology
What Should Not Be Unearthed (2015)	Vile Nilotic Rites (2019)	The Underworld Awaits Us All (2024)

Vile Nilotic Rites is the ninth studio album by American technical death metal band Nile, released through Nuclear Blast on November 1, 2019. It is the band's only album with bassist/vocalist Brad Parris and first with guitarist/vocalist Brian Kingsland, the latter of whom replaced Dallas Toler-Wade in 2017. Two singles, "Long Shadows of Dread" and the title track, were released from the album. Nile toured North America throughout November and December 2019 in support of the record.

== Background and recording ==
Drummer George Kollias called Vile Nilotic Rites a "special album for all of us since each member contributed on this a lot. I feel it represents the teamwork spirit Nile has right now and that shows on stage as well." The album was recorded at Serpent Headed Studios in Greenville, South Carolina.

The son of frontman Karl Sanders, Kael Sanders, appears as a guest vocalist on the album, as well as several other guest vocalists.

== Critical reception ==
Professional ratings
Review scores
Source	Rating
Blabbermouth.net	8/10
MetalSucks.net	4/5 stars

The album was generally well-received by critics and fans alike. Writing for Metal Injection, Austin Weber noted that the most distinct difference about the album from the band's other albums is the "influx of what you might call more "traditional" tech-death lead-work taking a larger role here beyond their patented frenetic riff style".

== Track listing ==
All lyrics are written by Karl Sanders.

No.	Title	Music	Length
1.	"Long Shadows of Dread"	Sanders; George Kollias	4:07
2.	"The Oxford Handbook of Savage Genocidal Warfare"	Brian Kingsland; Kollias; Brad Parris	3:09
3.	"Vile Nilotic Rites"	Sanders; Kollias	3:28
4.	"Seven Horns of War"	Sanders; Kollias	8:48
5.	"That Which Is Forbidden"	Kollias; Kingsland	5:35
6.	"Snake Pit Mating Frenzy"	Sanders; Kollias; Parris	2:48
7.	"Revel in Their Suffering"	Kingsland; Kollias	5:44
8.	"Thus Sayeth the Parasites of the Mind" (Instrumental)	Sanders; Parris	1:42
9.	"Where Is the Wrathful Sky"	Kollias; Sanders; Kingsland	4:40
10.	"The Imperishable Stars Are Sickened"	Kingsland; Kollias; Sanders	8:00
11.	"We Are Cursed"	Sanders; Kollias	6:53
Total length:			54:54

== Personnel ==
Nile

- Karl Sanders – guitars, vocals, keyboards
- George Kollias – drums, percussion
- Brad Parris – bass, vocals
- Brian Kingsland – guitars, vocals

Additional musicians

- Mike Breazeale – guest vocal
- Jon Vesano - additional vocal
- Jason Hohenstein - additional vocal
- Joshua Ward - additional vocal
- Zach Jeter - additional vocal
- Loren Forester - additional vocal
- Kael Sanders - additional vocal
- Hunter Ross - additional vocal
- William Boyd - additional vocal
- Matt Arflin - additional vocal

Production and design

- Karl Sanders – production, recording
- Mark Lewis – mixing and mastering
- Jim Touras – engineering (drums)
- George Dovolos – engineering (drums)
- Brian Muniz – engineering (assistant)
- Michael "Xaay" Loranc – cover art, layout

== Charts ==
Chart (2019)	Peak position
German Albums (Offizielle Top 100)	54
Scottish Albums (OCC)	72
Spanish Albums (PROMUSICAE)	94
