= Black Seeds of Vengeance =

Studio album by Nile
- Released: 5 September 2000
- Recorded: 2000
- Studio: The Sound Lab, Lexington, South Carolina
- Genre: Technical death metal
- Length: 42:49
- Label: Relapse Records
- Producer: Bob Moore, Karl Sanders

Nile chronology
Amongst the Catacombs of Nephren-Ka (1998)	Black Seeds of Vengeance (2000)	In the Beginning (2000)

Black Seeds of Vengeance is the second studio album by American technical death metal band Nile, released on September 5, 2000, through Relapse Records. It was the first album in Nile's discography to mark a more complex musical direction, as well as feature extensive liner notes in the booklet, written by Karl Sanders to explain the concept and themes behind each song. It also was the band's first album recorded with vocalist/guitarist Dallas Toler-Wade (who performed with the band until 2017), and features Derek Roddy as a session drummer, temporarily replacing previous drummer Pete Hammoura who left the band due to injuries sustained while touring. Bassist Chief Spires left shortly after touring for the album.

== Critical reception and legacy ==
Professional ratings
Review scores
Source	Rating
Allmusic	2.5/5 stars
Sputnikmusic	3.5/5 stars
Metalcrypt	5/5 stars

Sean Palmerston of Exclaim! called the album "some of the most brutal American death metal to ever be released" and said it was one of the top five metal releases of the year.

In 2020, it was named one of the 20 best metal albums of 2000 by Metal Hammer magazine.

In another issue of Metal Hammer, founding member Karl Sanders described the album as a "terrible fucking mix", but when asked about the album's retrospective he said "it touched people. They were able to get something they wanted from it, which I believe is the songs, the violence, the energy, the darkness of it. That’s what matters. This record is far from perfect, but there is a vibe to it… there’s a definite violence. If I had to choose between violence and evil or technical perfection, I choose violence and evil!”

== Track listing ==
All tracks are written by Karl Sanders, except "Multitude of Foes" written by Dallas Toler-Wade.

No.	Title	Length
1.	"Invocation of the Gate of Aat-Ankh-es-en-Amenti" (Instrumental)	0:43
2.	"Black Seeds of Vengeance"	3:35
3.	"Defiling the Gates of Ishtar"	3:38
4.	"The Black Flame"	3:21
5.	"Libation Unto the Shades Who Lurk in the Shadows of the Temple of Anhur" (Instrumental)	1:32
6.	"Masturbating the War God"	5:41
7.	"Multitude of Foes"	2:09
8.	"Chapter for Transforming into a Snake"	2:25
9.	"Nas Akhu Khan she en Asbiu"	4:15
10.	"To Dream of Ur"	9:07
11.	"The Nameless City of the Accursed" (Instrumental)	2:51
12.	"Khetti Satha Shemsu"	3:32
Total length:		42:49

Japanese bonus track
No.	Title	Length
1.	"The Black Hand of Set"	2:20
Total length:		45:09

== Personnel ==
- Karl Sanders - guitars, vocals, keyboards
- Dallas Toler-Wade - guitars, vocals
- Chief Spires - bass, vocals
- Derek Roddy - drums, vocals

Additional Musicians

- Pete Hammoura - vocals, drums on "To Dream of Ur"
- Boz Porter - vocals on "Defiling the Gates of Ishtar"
- Mostafa Abd el Aziz - Arghul on "Invocation of the Gate of Aat-Ankh-es-en-Amenti"
- Ross Dolan - vocals on "Khetti Satha Shemsu"
- Gary Jones - vocals on "Defiling the Gates of Ishtar", "Masturbating the War God" and "Khetti Satha Shemsu"
- Bob Moore - vocals on "Khetti Satha Shemsu"
- Aly et Maher el Helbney - respirations on "The Nameless City of the Accursed"
- Scott Wilson - lead vocals on "To Dream of Ur", backing vocals on "Khetti Satha Shemsu"
- Mohammed el Hebney - additional vocals on "Khetti Satha Shemsu"

Production

- Bob Moore - engineering, mixing, producer
- Wes Benscoter - cover art
- Dave Shirk - mastering
- Karl Sanders - producer
- Adam Peterson - graphics, imagery
