= Saurian Exorcisms =

Studio album by Karl Sanders
- Released: 14 April 2009
- Recorded: 2009 at Serpent Headed Studios and The Sound Lab, Columbia, South Carolina
- Genre: Folk, ambient, post-rock
- Length: 47:19
- Label: The End Records
- Producer: Bob Moore, Juan "Punchy" Gonzalez

Karl Sanders chronology
Saurian Meditation (2004)	Saurian Exorcisms (2009)	Saurian Apocalypse (2022)

Professional ratings
Review scores
Source	Rating
AllMusic	4/5 stars
Decoymusic.com	3.5/5 stars

Saurian Exorcisms is the second solo album by Karl Sanders, the vocalist/guitarist of the death metal band Nile. It was released on 14 April 2009 through The End Records. The music is a full length exploration of the atmospheric interludes heard on Nile's previous albums, and still draws on ancient Iraqi themes for inspiration. Sanders also drew inspiration from other types of music such as Tibetan, Indian and Arabic.

== Track listing ==
All songs written and composed by Karl Sanders.

1. "Preliminary Purification Before the Calling of Inanna" – 3:51
2. "Rapture of the Empty Spaces" – 4:23
3. "Contemplate This on the Tree of Woe" – 3:53
4. "A Most Effective Exorcism Against Azathoth and His Emissaries" – 5:29
5. "Slavery Unto Nitokris" – 5:54
6. "Shira Gula Pazu" – 4:59
7. "Kali Ma" – 3:38
8. "Curse the Sun" – 4:52
9. "Impalement and Cruxifiction of the Last Remnants of the Pre-Human Serpent Volk" – 4:10
10. "Dying Embers of the Aga Mass SSSratu" – 6:10

== Personnel ==
- Karl Sanders - baglama saz, glissentar, acoustic guitars, guitar synthesizer, keyboards, drums, percussion, vocals
- Mike Brezeale - vocals and chants

Production

- Produced by Bob Moore & Juan "Punchy" Gonzalez
- Mixed by "Bob Moore & His Orchestra"
