= Amongst the Catacombs of Nephren-Ka =

Studio album by Nile
- Released: 28 April 1998
- Recorded: 1998
- Studio: The Sound Lab, Columbia, South Carolina
- Genre: Technical death metal
- Length: 33:07
- Label: Relapse
- Producer: Bob Moore, Earl Sanders

Nile chronology
Amongst the Catacombs of Nephren-Ka (1998)	Black Seeds of Vengeance (2000)

Amongst the Catacombs of Nephren-Ka is the debut studio album by American technical death metal band Nile. The album was released on April 28, 1998, through Relapse Records. The album is considered to be their breakthrough record. Unique in the discography, the songs on this album are notably shorter in length than those featured on subsequent Nile albums. This album is the only release besides Ithyphallic to not include Karl Sanders's liner notes explaining each song.

The title of the album is a reference to the H. P. Lovecraft story "The Outsider". The phrase is featured in the song "Beneath Eternal Oceans of Sand" which has lyrics paraphrased from the aforementioned tale. In Lovecraft's Cthulhu Mythos, Nephren-Ka was an Egyptian Pharaoh whose unspeakable cult worship led him to be stricken from almost all Egyptian records. The catacombs where he is buried are referenced in several Lovecraft stories as well as many stories by other mythos authors. The song "Smashing the Antiu" is about a festival celebrating the destruction of the Antiu, a people with whom the early Egyptians were frequently at war.

The orchestral intro on "Ramses Bringer of War" is strongly inspired by Gustav Holst's Mars movement from The Planets, written between 1914 and 1916.

The title of the song "Das rache krieg lied der Assyriche" roughly translates as "The Revenge War Song of the Assyrians" in German ("Das Rache-Kriegslied der Assyrer").

The album was inducted into Decibel's Hall of Fame in June 2009 (No. 52).

== Critical reception ==
Professional ratings
Review scores
Source	Rating
Allmusic	4/5 stars
MetalCrypt	4.5/5 stars

Matt Kantor for AllMusic called the album "a stand-out death metal release, expanding the genre's scope but staying true to its extreme, blood soaked roots." Invisible Oranges called the album "Nile's breakthrough moment, leaving behind all traces of thrash" while climbing "the death metal ladder with speed and dexterity." In a retrospective of the album, Tom G. Wolf of Astral Noize "marked the start of an impressive career for the band" and it "still remains an essential listen."

== Track listing ==
All tracks written by Karl Sanders

No.	Title	Length
1.	"Smashing the Antiu"	2:18
2.	"Barra Edinazzu"	2:47
3.	"Kudurru Maqlu" (Instrumental)	1:05
4.	"Serpent Headed Mask"	2:18
5.	"Ramses Bringer of War"	4:45
6.	"Stones of Sorrow"	4:17
7.	"Die rache krieg lied der Assyriche"	3:13
8.	"The Howling of the Jinn"	2:34
9.	"Pestilence and Iniquity"	1:54
10.	"Opening of the Mouth"	3:39
11.	"Beneath Eternal Oceans of Sand"	4:17
Total length:		33:07

Japanese bonus track
No.	Title	Length
12.	"Wrought"	8:44
Total length:		41:51

== Personnel ==
Nile

- Karl Sanders - guitars, vocals, keyboards
- Chief Spires - bass, vocals
- Pete Hammoura - drums, vocals, dumbecks

Additional musicians

- Drilbu Dungkar - thigh bone flutes, Turkish gongs
- Mahala Kapala - Damaru human skull drums
- Mudflap - additional vocals on "Die rache krieg lied der Assyriche"
- Penga Grande - additional vocals on "Die rache krieg lied der Assyriche"
- Gyuto Drupka - choir

Production

- Adam Peterson - artwork
- Bob Moore - producer, engineering
- Matthew Jacobson - executive producer
- Earl Sanders - producer
- Bill Yurkiewicz - executive producer
