= Ithyphallic (album) =

Studio album by Nile
- Released: July 17, 2007
- Recorded: February – April 2007
- Studio: Sound Lab, Columbia, South Carolina
- Genre: Technical death metal
- Length: 49:47
- Label: Nuclear Blast
- Producer: Neil Kernon

Nile chronology
Legacy of the Catacombs (2007)	Ithyphallic (2007)	Those Whom the Gods Detest (2009)

Singles from Ithyphallic
- 1. "Papyrus Containing the Spell to Preserve Its Possessor Against Attacks from He Who Is in the Water" Released: June 22, 2007

Professional ratings
Review scores
Source	Rating
About.com	4/5 stars
Blabbermouth.net	8.5/10
Chronicles of Chaos	8.5/10
Ultimate Guitar	4.5/5 stars
Metal.de	8/10

Ithyphallic is the fifth studio album by American technical death metal band Nile. It was released on July 17, 2007 through Nuclear Blast, in both standard and digipak formats. It is the band's first album released on Nuclear Blast, since signing with them in May 2006. It is also the band's only album since Amongst the Catacombs of Nephren-Ka not to feature notes explaining the context of the lyrics. 1,000 limited edition copies of the album were released in a pyramid-shaped box containing the disc, several images, a certificate of ownership and a scroll containing the lyrics and liner notes from the album. The cover art of this album depicts a statue of the god of fertility "Min", being erected by Egyptian slaves. The title means "Erected Phallus" in ancient Greek.

== Promotion ==
Throughout June and July, Nuclear Blast Records held a special contest to allow several fans to be able to listen to Ithyphallic. The rules were that they would have to be able to decipher a secret hieroglyphic message. If they won, they were given an email containing a link to a website where the album was posted for the free listening. On July 7, the contest ended, and the answer was revealed to be "papyrus."

== Track listing ==
All lyrics are written by Karl Sanders.

No.	Title	Music	Length
1.	"What Can Be Safely Written"	Sanders; George Kollias	8:15
2.	"As He Creates So He Destroys"	Dallas Toler-Wade; Kollias	4:36
3.	"Ithyphallic"	Sanders; Kollias	4:40
4.	"Papyrus Containing the Spell to Preserve its Possessor Against Attacks from He Who is in the Water"	Sanders; Kollias	2:56
5.	"Eat of the Dead"	Sanders; Kollias	6:29
6.	"Laying Fire Upon Apep"	Sanders; Kollias	3:25
7.	"The Essential Salts"	Toler-Wade; Kollias	3:51
8.	"The Infinity of Stone" (Instrumental)	Sanders	2:04
9.	"Language of the Shadows"	Toler-Wade; Kollias	3:30
10.	"Even the Gods Must Die"	Sanders; Kollias; Toler-Wade	10:01
Total length:			49:47

Limited digipak edition bonus tracks
No.	Title	Music	Length
1.	"As He Creates So He Destroys" (Instrumental)	Toler-Wade; Kollias	4:50
2.	"Papyrus Containing the Spell to Preserve Its Possessor Against Attacks From He Who Is in the Water" (Instrumental)	Sanders; Kollias	2:56
Total length:			57:33

== Papyrus Containing the Spell to Preserve its Possessor Against Attacks from He Who is in the Water ==
"Papyrus Containing the Spell to Preserve its Possessor Against Attacks from He Who is in the Water"
- Front cover of the music download version

Single by Nile

from the album Ithyphallic
- B-side: "Laying Fire Upon Apep"
- Released: June 22, 2007
- Genre: Technical death metal
- Length: 2:56
- Label: Nuclear Blast
- Songwriter(s): Karl Sanders, George Kollias
- Producer(s): Neil Kernon

Papyrus Containing the Spell to Preserve its Possessor Against Attacks from He Who is in the Water is Nile's second single, originally released only as a music download through Nuclear Blast's website. It contains the title-track, a rehearsal of "Laying Fire Upon Apep", and a video featuring a drum session from Ithyphallic.

In April 2008, Night of the Vinyl Dead Records announced the release of what they call as "the first-ever brutal death metal-shaped picture disc". The 7-inch version of "Papyrus..." features the title-track on the A-side, with "As He Creates So He Destroys" and an instrumental version of "Papyrus.." as B-sides. It was limited to 500 copies hand-numbered on backing card.

No.	Title	Length
1.	"Papyrus Containing the Spell to Preserve its Possessor Against Attacks from He Who is in the Water"	2:57
2.	"Laying Fire upon Apep" (Rehearsal)	3:32
3.	"Drum Session" (Video)	16:50

2007 7" Vinyl Track Listing

Side A

No.	Title	Length
1.	"Papyrus Containing the Spell to Preserve its Possessor Against Attacks from He Who is in the Water"	2:57

Side B

No.	Title	Length
2.	"Laying Fire upon Apep" (Rehearsal)	3:32
Total length:		6:29

2008 7" Vinyl Track Listing

Side A

No.	Title	Length
1.	"Papyrus Containing the Spell to Preserve its Possessor Against Attacks from He Who is in the Water"	2:57

Side B

No.	Title	Length
1.	"As He Creates So He Destroys" (Instrumental)	4:50
2.	"Papyrus Containing the Spell to Preserve its Possessor Against Attacks from He Who is in the Water" (Instrumental)	2:56
Total length:		10:43

== Historical and fictional references ==
- "As He Creates So He Destroys", "Eat of the Dead", "The Essential Salts", "The Language of the Shadows" and "What Can Be Safely Written" are taken from Canadian occultist Donald Tyson's Necronomicon: The Wanderings of Alhazred, itself a tribute to the fictional mythology of H.P. Lovecraft.
- "Ithyphallic" means "to have the penis erect."
- "Laying Fire Upon Apep" is a reference to one of the methods described in the Books of Apophis that Ra would use to overcome the Fiend Apep in their nightly duels.
- "Papyrus Containing the Spell to Preserve its Possessor Against Attacks from He Who is in the Water" is a reference to a spell from The Book of the Dead. The spell is intended to protect those in the afterlife from being eaten by crocodiles.
- "The Essential Salts" is also a reference to the salts used to preserve the corpse of a Pharaoh in mummification, natron, although the term itself is from Lovecraft's The Case of Charles Dexter Ward.

== Chart positions ==
Year	Chart	Position
2007	Finnish Chart	#13
2007	German Charts	#76
2007	Billboard Top 200	#162
2007	Billboard Top Heatseekers Chart	#4

== Personnel ==
- Karl Sanders – guitars, vocals
- Dallas Toler-Wade – guitars, bass, vocals
- George Kollias – drums

Additional musician

- Chris Lollis – additional vocals

Production

- Neil Kernon – producer, recording, mixing
- Bob Moore – engineering, drum tuning
- Davide Nadalin – artwork, design
