= Saurian Meditation =

Studio album by Karl Sanders
- Released: 26 October 2004
- Recorded: 2004 at Serpent Speech Studios and The Sound Lab, Columbia, South Carolina
- Genre: Folk, ambient, post-rock
- Length: 56:30
- Label: Relapse Records
- Producer: Bob Moore

Karl Sanders chronology
Saurian Meditation (2004)	Saurian Exorcisms (2009)

Professional ratings
Review scores
Source	Rating
AllMusic	3.5/5 stars

Saurian Meditation is the first solo album by Karl Sanders, the vocalist/guitarist of the technical death metal band Nile. It was released on 26 October 2004 through Relapse Records. The music is a full length exploration of the atmospheric interludes heard on Nile's previous albums, and still draws on ancient Babylonia and Lovecraftian themes for inspiration. The album was well received by metal and non-metal listeners alike.

== Track listing ==
1. "Awaiting the Vultures" – 3:52
2. "Of the Sleep of Ishtar" – 9:35
3. "Luring the Doom Serpent" – 4:00
4. "Contemplations of the Endless Abyss" – 3:43
5. "The Elder God Shrine" – 7:33
6. "Temple of Lunar Ascension" – 3:51
7. "Dreaming Through the Eyes of Serpents" – 6:16
8. "Whence No Traveler Returns" – 5:36
9. "The Forbidden Path Across the Chasm of Self-Realization" – 5:53
10. "Beckon the Sick Winds of Pestilence" – 6:04

== Personnel ==
- Karl Sanders – baglama saz, acoustic guitar, electric guitar, ebow, guitar synthesizer, keyboards, bass guitar
- Mike Brezeale – vocals
- Pete Hammoura – drums, percussion

Special guests

- Shawn Allen – acoustic guitar on "Whence No Traveler Returns"
- Dallas Toler-Wade – harmony vocals on "The Elder God Shrine"
- David Vincent – narration on "The Forbidden Path Across the Chasm of Self Realization"
- Juan Gonzalez – drums on "Beckon the Sick Winds of Pestilence", lead gong on "Whence No Traveler Returns", harmony vocals on "The Elder God Shrine"
