= What Should Not Be Unearthed =

- Cover art by Michal "Xaay" Loranc

Studio album by Nile
- Released: August 28, 2015
- Studios: Sound Lab, Columbia, South Carolina (drums); Serpent Headed Studios/OTB, Greenville, South Carolina
- Genre: Technical death metal
- Length: 50:03
- Label: Nuclear Blast
- Producer: Nile

Nile chronology
At the Gate of Sethu (2012)	What Should Not Be Unearthed (2015)	Vile Nilotic Rites (2019)

What Should Not Be Unearthed is the eighth studio album by American technical death metal band Nile. The album was released on August 28, 2015 in North America through Nuclear Blast. It is the last album to feature Dallas Toler-Wade before his departure from the band in 2017.

On July 7, 2015, the album's track listing was revealed with two lyric videos being released soon after.

Professional ratings
Review scores
Source	Rating
Blabbermouth.net	9/10
Metal Injection	7.5/10
Metal Storm	7.5/10
New Noise Magazine	4/5 stars

== Track listing ==
All lyrics are written by Karl Sanders.

No.	Title	Music	Length
1.	"Call to Destruction"	Sanders; George Kollias	5:45
2.	"Negating the Abominable Coils of Apep"	Sanders; Kollias	4:14
3.	"Liber Stellae Rubeae"	Sanders; Dallas Toler-Wade; Kollias	3:48
4.	"In the Name of Amun"	Sanders; Kollias	6:49
5.	"What Should Not Be Unearthed"	Sanders; Kollias	6:58
6.	"Evil to Cast Out Evil"	Sanders; Toler-Wade; Kollias	5:37
7.	"Age of Famine"	Sanders; Kollias	4:11
8.	"Ushabti Reanimator" (Instrumental)	Sanders	1:30
9.	"Rape of the Black Earth"	Sanders; Toler-Wade; Kollias	4:35
10.	"To Walk Forth from Flames Unscathed"	Sanders; Kollias	6:36
Total length:			50:03

== Personnel ==
Nile

- Karl Sanders − guitars, vocals, bass, keyboards, glissentar, baglama saz
- Dallas Toler-Wade − guitars, vocals, bass
- George Kollias − drums

Additional personnel

- Pete Hammoura − percussion, vocals
- Mike Breazeale − vocals
- Brad Parris − vocals

Production

- Nile − production
- Neil Kernon − mixing
- Bob Moore − drum engineering
- Alan Douches − mastering

Cover artwork

- Michał "Xaay" Loranc

== Charts ==
Chart (2015)	Peak position
Australian Albums (ARIA)	94
Belgian Albums (Ultratop Flanders)	107
Belgian Albums (Ultratop Wallonia)	129
Dutch Albums (Album Top 100)	59
Finnish Albums (Suomen virallinen lista)	24
French Albums (SNEP)	132
Hungarian Albums (MAHASZ)	35
US Heatseekers Albums (Billboard)	2
