= The Underworld Awaits Us All =

Studio album by Nile
- Released: August 23, 2024
- Studios: Serpent Headed Studios/OTB, Greenville, South Carolina, US
- Genres: Technical death metal, brutal death metal
- Length: 53:39
- Label: Napalm
- Producer: Karl Sanders

Nile chronology
Vile Nilotic Rites (2019)	The Underworld Awaits Us All (2024)

Professional ratings
Review scores
Source	Rating
Blabbermouth.net	9/10
Metal Injection	7.5/10
Sputnikmusic	3.8/5

The Underworld Awaits Us All is the tenth studio album by American technical death metal band Nile, released through Napalm Records on August 23, 2024. The album features founding member Karl Sanders on guitars and vocals, longtime member George Kollias on drums, and Brian Kingsland on guitars and vocals. It is the only album to feature Dan Vadim Von on bass and vocals, and the first to feature Zach Jeter contributing vocals, as well as guest guitar solos in the songs "Stelae of Vultures" and "Naqada II Enter the Golden Age".

== Track listing ==
All lyrics are written by Karl Sanders, except where noted.

The Underworld Awaits Us All track listing
No.	Title	Lyrics	Music	Length
1.	"Stelae of Vultures"		Karl Sanders, George Kollias	6:20
2.	"Chapter for Not Being Hung Upside Down on a Stake in the Underworld and Made to Eat Feces by the Four Apes"		Sanders, Kollias	3:50
3.	"To Strike with Secret Fang"	Sanders, Kingsland	Sanders, Kollias, Brian Kingsland	1:59
4.	"Naqada II Enter the Golden Age"		Sanders, Kollias	5:28
5.	"The Pentagrammathion of Nephren-Ka" (Instrumental)		Sanders	1:18
6.	"Overlords of the Black Earth"		Sanders, Kollias	4:45
7.	"Under the Curse of the One God"		Sanders, Kollias	4:46
8.	"Doctrine of Last Things"		Sanders, Kollias	4:40
9.	"True Gods of the Desert"	Sanders, Kingsland	Kollias, Kingsland	7:08
10.	"The Underworld Awaits Us All"		Sanders, Kollias	8:36
11.	"Lament For the Destruction of Time" (Instrumental)		Kollias, Kingsland	4:51
Total length:				53:39

== Personnel ==
Nile

- Karl Sanders – guitars, vocals, keyboards
- George Kollias – drums
- Brian Kingsland – guitars, vocals
- Zach Jeter – guitars, vocals
- Dan Vadim Von – bass, vocals

Additional musicians

- Jason Hohenstein – guest vocals on "Chapter for Not Being Hung Upside Down On a Stake in the Underworld and Made to Eat Feces by the Four Apes"

Production and Design

- Karl Sanders – production, recording, liner notes
- Mark Lewis – mixing and mastering
- George Dovolos – engineering (drums)
- Michael "Xaay" Loranc – cover art, layout
- Michelle Mercado – studio admin

== Charts ==
Chart performance for The Underworld Awaits Us All
Chart (2024)	Peak position
Austrian Albums (Ö3 Austria)	11
Belgian Albums (Ultratop Wallonia)	187
German Albums (Offizielle Top 100)	20
Scottish Albums (Official Charts)	28
Swiss Albums (Schweizer Hitparade)	39
UK Album Downloads (Official Charts)	41
UK Independent Albums (Official Charts)	11
UK Rock & Metal Albums (Official Charts)	5
