= At the Gate of Sethu =

- Cover artwork by Spiros Antoniou

Studio album by Nile
- Released: June 29, 2012
- Recorded: May 2011 – February 2012
- Studio: Sound Lab, Columbia, South Carolina (drums); Serpent Headed Studios/OTB, Greenville, South Carolina
- Genre: Technical death metal
- Length: 47:33
- Label: Nuclear Blast
- Producer: Neil Kernon

Nile chronology
Those Whom the Gods Detest (2009)	At the Gate of Sethu (2012)	What Should Not Be Unearthed (2015)

Professional ratings
Review scores
Source	Rating
About.com	4/5 stars
Metal Review	(6.5/10)

At the Gate of Sethu is the seventh studio album by American technical death metal band Nile. The album was released on June 29, 2012, in Europe, and on July 3, 2012, in North America through Nuclear Blast.

On May 25, 2012, the album's second track, "The Fiends Who Come to Steal the Magick of the Deceased", debuted on Noisecreep.

On November 22, 2012, Nile released their music video for "Enduring the Eternal Molestation of Flame".

The album's artwork was handled by Spiros "Seth Siro Anton" Antoniou of Septic Flesh.

It is Nile's highest charting album to date, hitting 131 on the U.S. charts.

== Track listing ==
All lyrics are written by Karl Sanders.

No.	Title	Music	Length
1.	"Enduring the Eternal Molestation of Flame"	Sanders; George Kollias	4:29
2.	"The Fiends Who Come to Steal the Magick of the Deceased"	Sanders; Kollias	4:30
3.	"The Inevitable Degradation of Flesh"	Dallas Toler-Wade; Kollias	5:30
4.	"When My Wrath Is Done"	Sanders; Kollias	3:11
5.	"Slaves of Xul" (Instrumental)	Sanders	1:24
6.	"The Gods Who Light Up the Sky at the Gate of Sethu"	Sanders; Kollias	5:43
7.	"Natural Liberation of Fear Through the Ritual Deception of Death"	Toler-Wade; Kollias	3:30
8.	"Ethno-Musicological Cannibalisms" (Instrumental)	Sanders	1:40
9.	"Tribunal of the Dead"	Sanders; Kollias	5:54
10.	"Supreme Humanism of Megalomania"	Toler-Wade; Kollias	4:37
11.	"The Chaining of the Iniquitous"	Sanders	7:05
Total length:			47:33

Bonus tracks
No.	Title	Music	Length
12.	"Enduring the Eternal Molestation of Flame" (Instrumental)	Sanders; Kollias	4:05
13.	"The Inevitable Degradation of Flesh" (Instrumental)	Toler-Wade; Kollias	5:30
Total length:			57:08

== Personnel ==
Nile

- Karl Sanders − guitars, vocals, bass, keyboards, glissentar, baglama saz
- Dallas Toler-Wade − guitars, vocals, bass
- George Kollias − drums

Additional personnel

- Jon Vesano − vocals
- Jason Hagan − vocals
- Mike Breazeale − vocals

Production

- Neil Kernon − production, mixing, engineering
- Bob Moore − additional engineering
- Spiros Antoniou − artwork

== Charts ==
Chart (2012)	Peak position
Austrian Albums (Ö3 Austria)	61
Belgian Albums (Ultratop Flanders)	156
Finnish Albums (Suomen virallinen lista)	37
French Albums (SNEP)	182
German Albums (Offizielle Top 100)	27
Swedish Albums (Sverigetopplistan)	41
Swiss Albums (Schweizer Hitparade)	61
