= The Metromen =

New York City-based rock group of the late 1970s-early 1980s

The Metromen were a New York City–based rock group of the late 1970s–early 1980s who created their own brand of punk/power pop music combining sophistication and humor. They disbanded before achieving commercial success. The Metromen rose out of the new wave period which was typified at the time by acts such as Joe Jackson, The Police, and Elvis Costello, all of whom were a large influence on the music and style of the band.

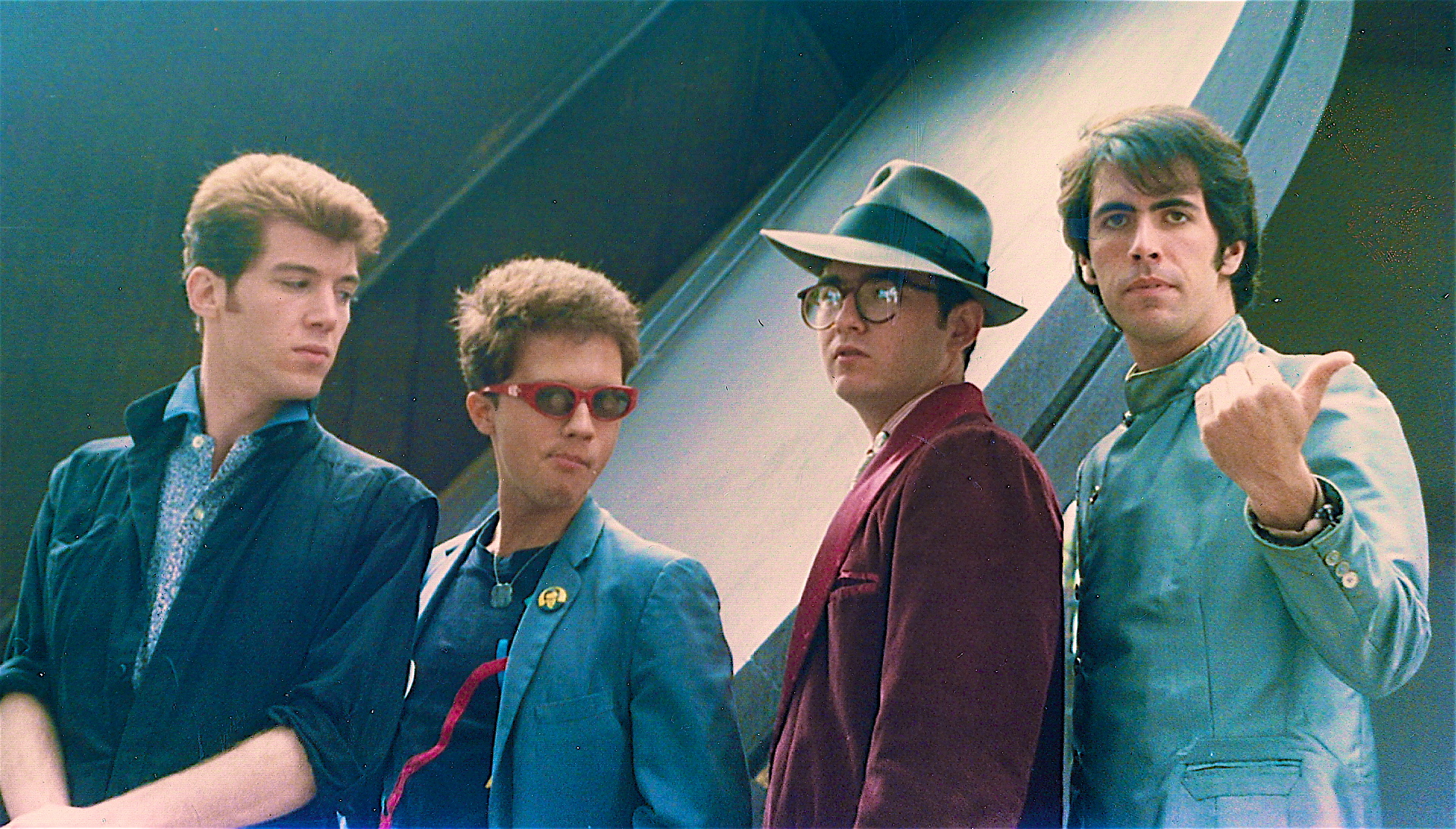
The Metromen circa 1980

== History ==
In late 1979 singer-songwriter Tom Teeley teamed up with longtime collaborator Russ Velazquez to start writing pared-down songs for a new project, bassist Bill Teeley joined, and finally multi-instrumentalist-drummer-songwriter Bob Miller was brought in to replace the first drummer Bennet Gale, thus creating 'The Metromen'. Miller, Velazquez and Tom Teeley had worked together previously in 1975-1976 as part of a five-piece pop-fusion band Jester, which emulated the more complex musical acts of the day such as Gentle Giant, Frank Zappa, and Mahavishnu Orchestra. Little of the fusion roots carried over into the new project, but the Zappa-style humor was kept intact. Shortly after their formation, the band signed a recording contract with Genya Ravan, most well known for her late 60's band Ten Wheel Drive. Ravan was starting an independent record label called Polish Records [as in polish the car]. The label would feature other up-and-coming NYC-based new wave bands, as well as perennials such as Ronnie Spector who was also signed to the fledgling label.

== Recordings ==
In mid 1980 The Metromen went into the studio, holing up at the famous Mediasound Studios on West 57th St. under the engineering skills of Harvey Goldberg. After completion of the album, the band began performing and showcasing the material in the New York club scene. Polish Records failed to launch as a viable label as a result of the label not being able to secure distribution of its product, and by 1981, the band and Polish Records went their separate ways. Without a recording deal, the Metromen set about producing and recording in their own facility, a catalog of new material which was meant to secure another recording contract for the band. To date, none of these Metromen recordings or albums have ever had commercial release.

== Performances ==
In August 1980, the Metromen debuted their act at the then newly opened Ritz ballroom on 11th St. in New York. The band surprised the crowd by presenting a self-directed 8-minute opening film The Metromen Take The Ritz which set the stage for their entrance to the Ritz stage as well as New York club scene. They continued building their reputation over the next year and a half as a tight band with a quirky take on pop and rock songwriting and powerful arrangements. The group built a strong following playing Mudd Club, Great Gildersleeves, Snafu and their mainstay, Trax, which is where they played their final show in December 1981. The Metromen reunited for a single performance in November 2007 at Maxwell's in Hoboken, NJ and were joined onstage by old friends Marshall Crenshaw, Glen Burtnik, and others.

== Aftermath ==
As the band entered 1982, the interest and fanbase grew, but internal dissent and other musical ventures outside the band caused the band to dissolve by mid 1982. Ironically, The Metromen quickly found themselves working together on the Broadway stage in the summer of 1982 portraying various rock icons in Dick Clark's Rock and Roll, The first 5000 Years In the years that followed the breakup the Metromen members went on to various successes. Bill Teeley went on to collaborate with Marshall Crenshaw on the hit Whenever You're On My Mind Tom Teeley released a solo album produced by Neil Kernon and was released on A&M Records Tales Of Glamour and Distress and went on to play alongside other artist such as Joe Jackson. Mr. Velazquez went on to become a successful session singer in New York, writing and singing the themes to many commercials and TV series such as Pokémon. Robert Miller has gone on to success as an orchestral composer for film and television.
