= Annihilation of the Wicked =

Studio album by Nile
- Released: May 23, 2005
- Recorded: December 2004 – January 2005
- Studios: The Sound Lab, Columbia, South Carolina
- Genre: Technical death metal
- Length: 52:00
- Label: Relapse
- Producer: Neil Kernon

Nile chronology
In Their Darkened Shrines (2002)	Annihilation of the Wicked (2005)	Legacy of the Catacombs (2007)

Professional ratings
Review scores
Source	Rating
Allmusic	3.5/5 stars
Blabbermouth	9/10
PopMatters	9/10
Chronicles of Chaos	9.5/10
Rock Hard	9.5/10
Metal.de	9/10
Scream Magazine	5/6

Annihilation of the Wicked is the fourth studio album by American technical death metal band Nile. The album was released in Europe on May 23, 2005, by Relapse Records, and on May 24, 2005 in North America. This is the first Nile album to feature George Kollias on drums, replacing Tony Laureano. This album marks Nile's last record released by Relapse. The liner notes detail the theme and writing/recording process of each song. A music video for "Sacrifice Unto Sebek" was produced. It is also the first Nile album produced by Neil Kernon.

== Music ==
"Von Unaussprechlichen Kulten" is German for "Of Unspeakable Cults", which is also the title of a fictional book from H.P. Lovecraft's universe.

== Release ==
A limited edition box set comes in a tin box with a custom Serpent Ankh necklace, full color album poster, vinyl sticker and an embroidered patch, limited to 5,000 copies.

== Reception and legacy ==
Guitar World called the album "a landmark release for technicality in death metal."

== Track listing ==
All lyrics written by Karl Sanders. All music written by Karl Sanders except where noted.

No.	Title	Writer(s)	Length
1.	"Dusk Falls Upon the Temple of the Serpent on the Mount of Sunrise" (Instrumental)		0:51
2.	"Cast Down the Heretic"		5:45
3.	"Sacrifice Unto Sebek"		3:03
4.	"User-Maat-Re"	Sanders; Dallas Toler-Wade	9:14
5.	"The Burning Pits of the Duat"	Toler-Wade	3:52
6.	"Chapter of Obeisance Before Giving Breath to the Inert One in the Presence of the Crescent Shaped Horns"		5:21
7.	"Lashed to the Slave Stick"	Toler-Wade	4:18
8.	"Spawn of Uamenti" (Instrumental)		1:14
9.	"Annihilation of the Wicked"		8:36
10.	"Von Unaussprechlichen Kulten"		9:46
Total length:			52:00

Japanese edition bonus track
No.	Title	Length
11.	"SSS Haa Set Yoth"	5:15
Total length:		57:15

== Personnel ==
- Karl Sanders − guitars, vocals, bağlama, keyboards, bouzouki
- Dallas Toler-Wade − guitars, vocals
- George Kollias − drums
- Jon Vesano − bass, vocals

Additional musicians

- Mike Brezeale − exorcism chants and Pazuzu bowl on "Chapter of Obeisance Before Giving Breath to the Inert One in the Presence of the Crescent Shaped Horns"

Production

- Bob Moore − engineering
- Orion Landau − artwork, layout
- Neil Kernon − recording, mixing, producer

== Charts ==
Chart performance for Annihilation of the Wicked
Chart (2005)	Peak position
Swedish Albums (Sverigetopplistan)	27
