= Rorschach Test (band) =

American band

- Origin: Denver, Colorado, United States
- Genres: Industrial metal
- Years active: c.1992–early 2000s, reformed 2010s
- Labels: E-Magine, Slipdisc
- Members: James Baker; Chris Cannella; Jason Kowalski; Luis Kalil
- Website: rorschachtestband.com

Rorschach Test is an American industrial band from Denver, Colorado, formed by James Baker.

== James Baker ==
Baker was a young minister based in Denver until being defrocked in the early 1990s for his allegedly heretical questioning of church doctrine.

He began writing music and lyrics after leaving the church. Soon after, he met guitarist Benjamin Anderson, from Yuma, Arizona, and the two began writing songs together. Baker and band members began composing "metallic, industrial songs with a definite debt to Ministry and Skinny Puppy but including elements of conventional metal."

== History ==
Rorschach Test formed in Denver, Colorado, with Baker joined by Anderson, guitarist Kris Geren, and keyboard player/programmer Troee Kerr. They later relocated to Seattle where they were signed to Chicago-based label Slip Disc Records. They enjoyed a successful career during Seattle's lively music scene in the 1990s. They toured North America playing shows with bands including Korn, Type O Negative, Genitorturers, and Queensrÿche.

The band's second album, Unclean, was released in 1998 on Slip Disc. They later signed to E-magine, who reissued the album in 2000.

The band's third album, Peace Minus One (2000), was listed as a "must hear" album by CMJ New Music Report, who described it as "one part raw metal, one part industrial...sharper than a bag full of razor blades." It also reached the top ten of the CMJ Metal chart. The band, along with Bile and Videodrone, Snake River Conspiracy, and N17 embarked on the 'Bush And Gore 2000' tour of the US that year.

In 2004 former Rorschach Test guitarist Aaron Slip joined Prong.

After breaking up in 2002, the band reformed after a hiatus of more than ten years, with a new album, American EyeDull, planned.

== Discography ==
- The Eleventh (1996)
- Unclean (Slipdisc 1998)
- Peace Minus One (E-Magine 2000)
- American EyeDull (TBD)
