= George Kollias (drummer) =

Greek metal drummer

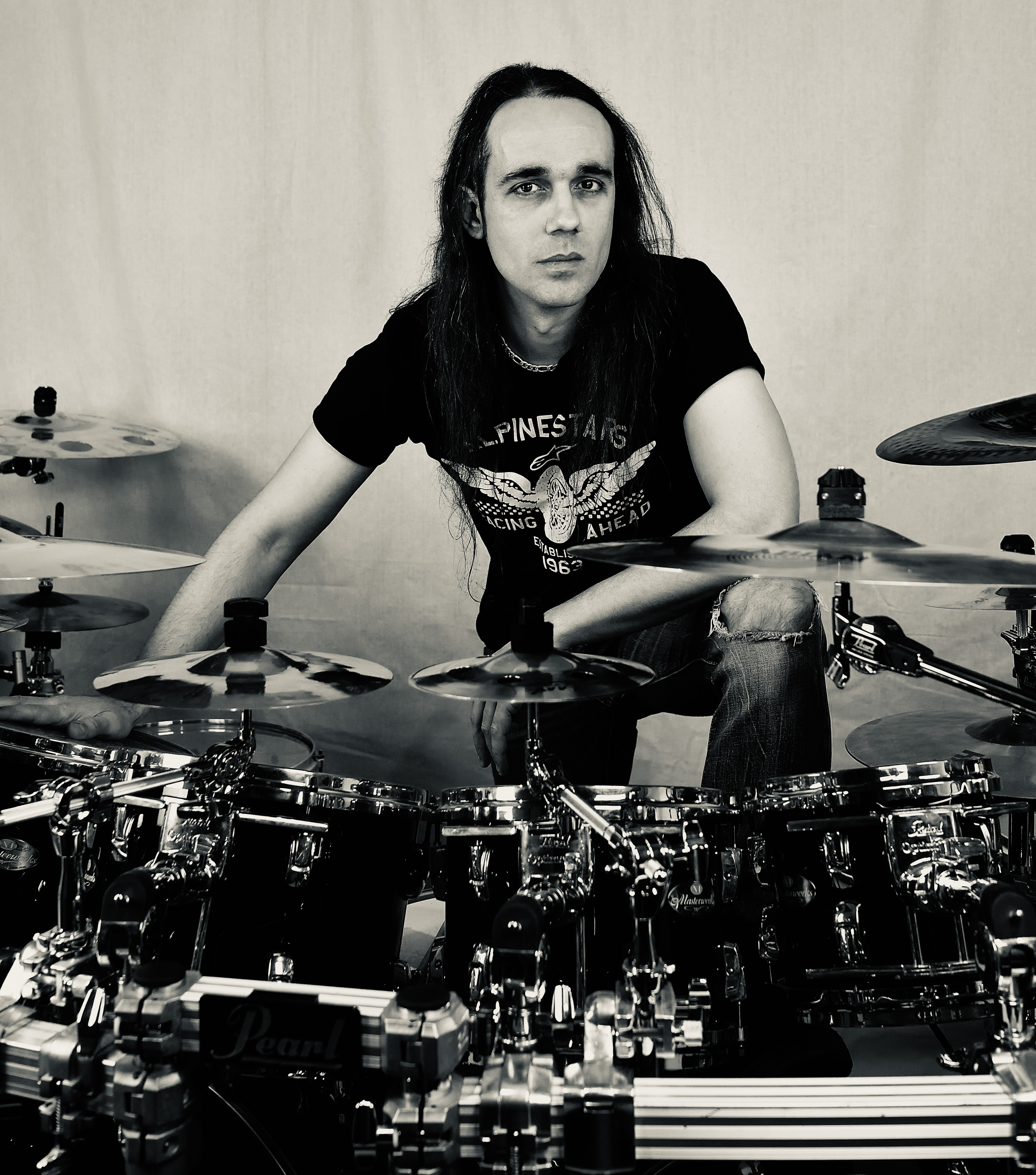

Background information
- Born: 30 August 1977 (age 48); Corinth, Greece
- Genres: Death metal, black metal, gothic metal, thrash metal
- Occupation: Drummer
- Years active: 1990–present
- Website: georgekollias.com

Giorgos "George" Kollias (Greek: Γεώργιος "Γιώργος" Κόλλιας; born 30 August 1977) is a Greek heavy metal drummer best known for his work with American technical death metal band Nile. He is the first Nile drummer to perform every song on more than one full-length album (handling drum duties on all the band's albums since Annihilation of the Wicked). His sponsors include Zildjian cymbals, Evans, Vic Firth, and Pearl; the last with whom he co-designed the Demon XR bass drum pedals. In addition to being the drummer of Nile, he also teaches drums at the Modern Music School in Athens.

== Biography ==
Kollias was born in Corinth. He started playing drums, self-taught, at the age of 12, covering songs of his favorite bands like Sepultura and Slayer. In 1990 he started his own band Extremity Obsession, performing drums and vocals along with guitarist brother Iraklis, releasing two demo tapes.

His early inspirations include Lars Ulrich, Richard Christy, Paul Bostaph, Pete Sandoval, Dave Lombardo, Igor Cavalera, Gene Hoglan. Later his taste expanded to different drummers like Vinnie Colaiuta, Dave Weckl, Steve Gadd, Thomas Lang, and Mike Mangini.

He previously drummed for Sickening Horror, a death metal band. He also used to be in the Greek melodic death metal band Nightfall but left the band in 2005 to join Nile.

Kollias made an instructional drumming DVD called Intense Metal Drumming that was released in July 2008.

== Technique ==
Kollias uses a foot technique in between heel up and heel down. His heels remain close to the bases of the pedals, but only his toes and the balls of his feet actually touch the pedal board. All the weight of his legs fall on the balls of his feet. When playing at slower bpms, Kollias's legs do the vast majority of the movement of a kick, moving up and down as much as the pedal does itself. However, as his speed increases, the heels of his feet move less and less, until the bpm is high enough that all the movement of the pedals stems from his ankles. Once he gets up to speeds that are this fast, he employs a swivel technique. In this technique, he uses his feet to keep count of the beats he has hit, moving his ankles to the right side of the pedal and then swinging them over to the other side of the pedal. In this way, as he explains, the extra energy that one's legs waste when they work so hard is utilized.

Kollias's hand technique gives him great precision as well, though it is not nearly as individualistic as his foot technique. Kollias grips the stick fully with his index through his ring finger, letting them stretch forward and wrap around the stick. He does not use his thumb and index finger to create a swivel. Instead, all of his speed stems from his wrists, much like his ankle usage in the kick.

== Discography ==
=== With Nile ===
- Annihilation of the Wicked (2005)
- Ithyphallic (2007)
- Those Whom the Gods Detest (2009)
- At the Gate of Sethu (2012)
- What Should Not Be Unearthed (2015)
- Vile Nilotic Rites (2019)
- The Underworld Awaits Us All (2024)

=== With Cerebrum ===
- Spectral Extravagance (2009)
- Cosmic Enigma (2013)

=== With Sickening Horror ===
- When Landscapes Bled Backwards (2007)

=== With Nightfall ===
- I Am Jesus (2003)
- Lyssa: Rural Gods and Astonishing Punishments (2004)

=== With Extremity Obsession ===
- Extremity Obsession (Demo, 1996)
- Everlasting (Demo, 1997)

=== With Deus Infestus ===
- Swansongs For This Stillborn Race (2010)

=== Personal releases ===
- Intense Metal Drumming DVD (DVD, 2008)
- Intense Metal Drumming II DVD (DVD, 2012)
- Invictus (LP, 2015)

=== With ADE ===
- Spartacus (2013)

=== With Týr ===
- Valkyrja (2013)

=== With Contrarian ===
- Predestined (2014)
- Polemic (2015)
- To Perceive Is To Suffer (2017)
- Their Worm Never Dies (2019)

=== With Demonstealer ===
- This Burden Is Mine (2016)

=== With Black Water Sunset ===
- Engraved Spectral Aeons (2023)
