= Nile (band) =

American technical death metal band

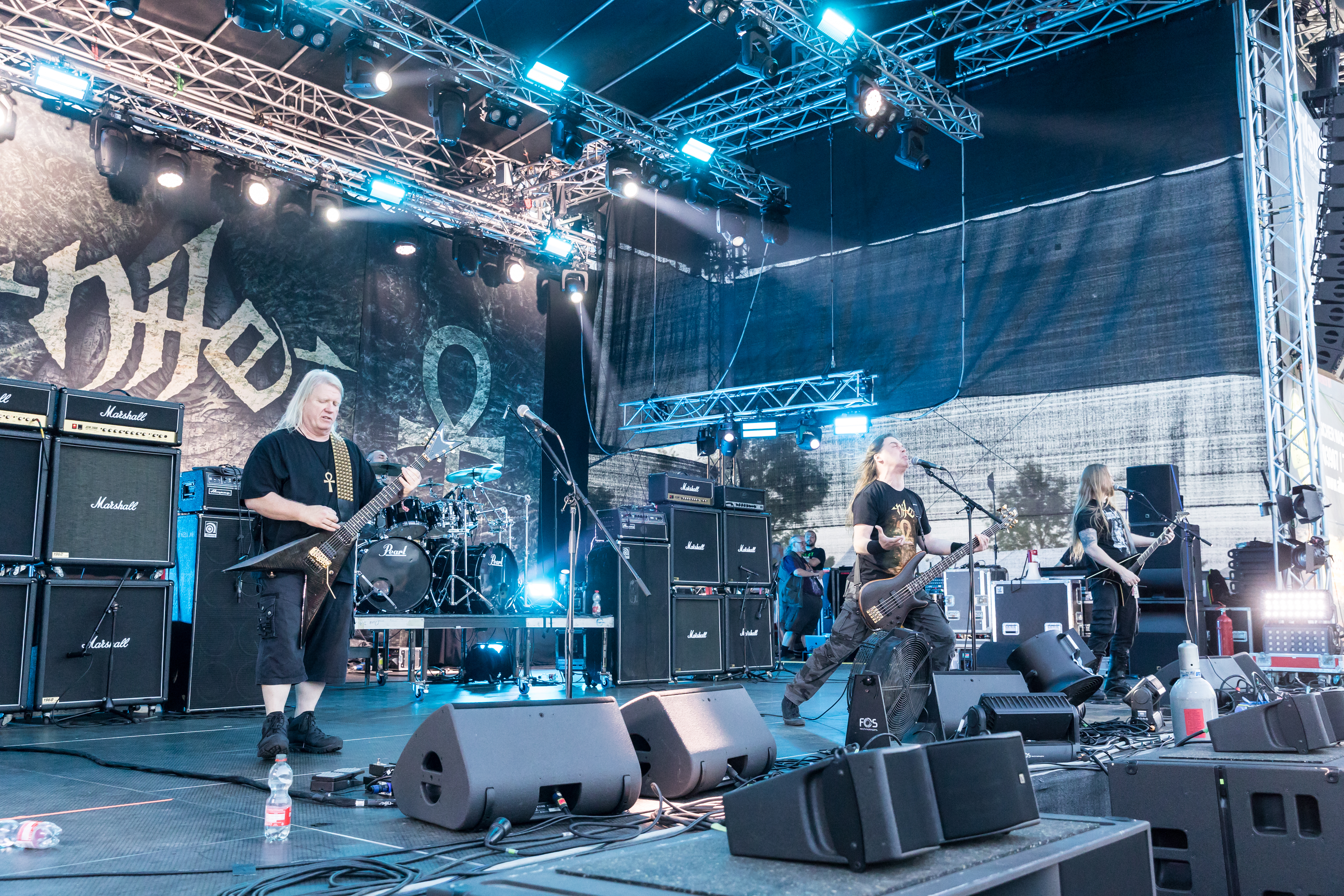
- Nile at Metal Frenzy Open Air/Germany 2025

Background information
- Origin: Greenville, South Carolina, U.S.
- Genre: Technical death metal
- Years active: 1993–present
- Labels: Relapse; Nuclear Blast; Napalm
- Members: Karl Sanders; George Kollias; Brian Kingsland; Zach Jeter; Adam Roethlisberger
- Past members: Chief Spires; Pete Hammoura; John Ehlers; Dallas Toler-Wade; Tony Laureano; Jon Vesano; Chris Lollis; Todd Ellis; Brad Parris; Dan Vadim Von
- Website: nile-official.com

Nile is an American technical death metal band from Greenville, South Carolina, formed in 1993. The band's current lineup consists of founding guitarist/vocalist Karl Sanders, drummer George Kollias, guitarist/vocalist Brian Kingsland, guitarist/vocalist Zach Jeter, and bassist/vocalist Adam Roethlisberger. The band is known for their lyrics and music inspired by Egyptology and H. P. Lovecraft. Since its formation, the band has released ten studio albums, two compilations, three extended plays, two demos, three singles, and five music videos. Their latest studio album, The Underworld Awaits Us All, was released on August 23, 2024, through Napalm Records.

== History ==
=== 1990s ===
Nile formed in Greenville, South Carolina in 1993 from a previous band called Morriah, which founding member Karl Sanders had performed in since the 1980s. The band is named after the Nile river. Nile released a self-titled thrash-influenced demo in 1994 (re-issued in 2011 under the title Worship the Animal - 1994: The Lost Recordings). Sanders, vocalist/bassist Chief Spires and drummer Pete Hammoura released the Festivals of Atonement EP in 1995, leading Nile to a southwestern tour in support of other metal acts such as Obituary, Deicide, and Broken Hope.

The EP Ramses Bringer of War was released by Visceral Productions in 1997. The label was due to release the band's first full-length album, Amongst the Catacombs of Nephren-Ka, but went out of business later that year. Relapse Records was open to releasing it early on, giving Nile a wider distribution and a chance to tour with Incantation and Morbid Angel. According to Sanders, "The vibe in the late 90s was that death metal was dead. We didn’t care though, because we were going to do whatever we wanted to do, the world be damned. [...] Already we had wrestled with the idea that probably no one was going to give a fuck, so let’s just do what we like and own it. We didn’t care about the ebb and flow of whatever is currently popular."

=== 2000s ===
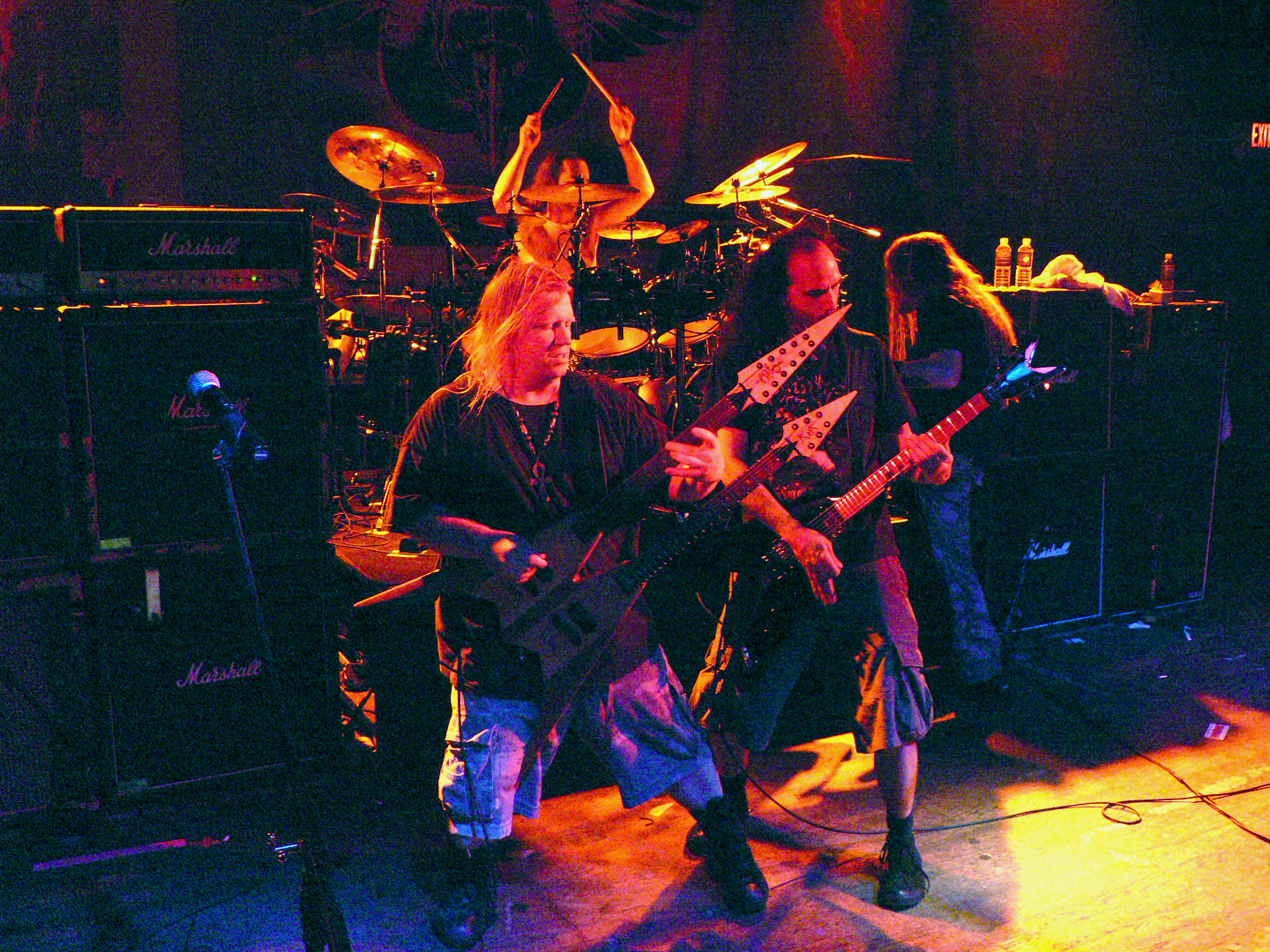
Nile performing at Jaxx Nightclub on August 27, 2007, in Springfield, Virginia

The follow-up, Black Seeds of Vengeance, was released in September 2000. Prior to the release, drummer Pete Hammoura left the band due to injuries sustained while touring with Catacomb. Derek Roddy stepped in as a session musician to perform on all tracks except "To Dream of Ur". Prior to the album, Dallas Toler-Wade joined as a second guitarist/vocalist. Chief Spires left the band a few months after the release of Black Seeds of Vengeance, citing personal and professional differences. Jon Vesano replaced him. The band found new drummer Tony Laureano.

In 2002, In Their Darkened Shrines was released. One reviewer noted that the album gave "death metal a cinematic, symphonic twist". Two videos were shot with director Darren Doane, "Sarcophagus" and "Execration Text", respectively.

The follow-up album, Annihilation of the Wicked, was released in 2005. Greek drummer George Kollias replaced Laureano, who left before recording began. After recording the bass parts for the album, Vesano left the band. He was temporarily replaced with Joe Payne on the following tour. Another Darren Doane-directed video was shot for "Sacrifice Unto Sebek".

In May 2006, Nile signed with Nuclear Blast. On February 26, 2007, Nile entered the studio to record their fifth full-length album, Ithyphallic, their first with the label. Karl Sanders had confirmed a release date of June 29, 2007, via a posting on the band's message board, later pushed back to July 20, 2007. As a special bonus, Nuclear Blast allowed several fans to listen to the album two weeks before its release if they could decipher a hieroglyphic message, to which "papyrus" was the answer. Upon the album's release, it sold 4,600 copies, which enabled Nile to get onto the Billboard 200 for the first time, reaching No. 162 on that chart.

On March 21, 2007, Nile was confirmed as a "Second Stage" act for Ozzfest 2007. A message from Sanders via Nile's MySpace profile indicated that they were excited to bring true death metal to an Ozzfest audience. From March to April 2008, Nile headlined a tour in the United States with Suicide Silence, The Faceless, Unexpect, and Warbringer. From September to October 2008, Nile headlined a European tour with Grave, Omnium Gatherum and Severe Torture. In October 2008, the band planned to tour South Africa, but the three shows were canceled for unknown reasons.

In June 2009, Nile began work on their sixth full-length album, Those Whom the Gods Detest. The album was released on November 3, 2009, and was critically well-received. One reviewer suggested "pretty much the only thing standing in Nile's way at this point is the fact that we as listeners have become so accustomed to the band's excellence that another excellent album seems almost par for the course".

=== 2010s ===
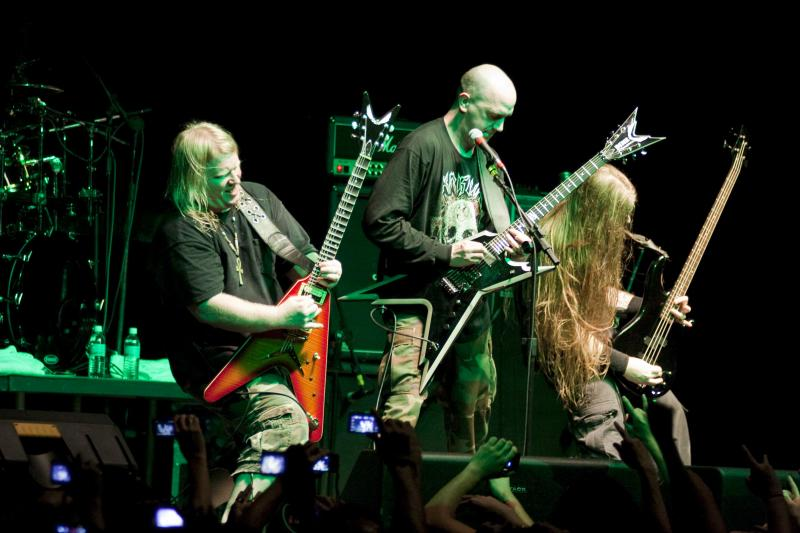
Nile performing at Santana Hall in 2010. From left to right: Karl Sanders, Dallas Toler-Wade and Chris Lollis.

On October 21, 2010, bassist Chris Lollis was confirmed as the new member for Nile, after four years of session work with the band. On December 6, 2011, Nile announced work in progress, and the completion of drum tracking, for their upcoming album in 2012.

On February 4, 2012, Sanders announced on his Facebook page new bassist Todd Ellis, who would contribute vocals to the new record. The next day, he explained on the band's official forum that he had lost contact with Chris Lollis during writing and recording the upcoming album, and after three months of silence, they hired a replacement. The seventh album, At the Gate of Sethu, was released on June 29, 2012.

On February 9, 2015, Ellis left the band, citing "unforeseen circumstances beyond my control". Nile's eighth studio album, What Should Not Be Unearthed, was released on August 28, 2015.

In the summer of 2016, the band took part in the Summer Slaughter tour.

In October 2016, after the Summer Slaughter tour, Dallas Toler-Wade left the band to focus on Narcotic Wasteland, and was replaced with Enthean vocalist/guitarist Brian Kingsland. Nile made the announcement in February 2017. In May 2017, the band began work on their ninth album, Vile Nilotic Rites, released on November 1, 2019.

=== 2020s ===
In July 2022, Sanders confirmed to Guitar World magazine that Nile was working on their tenth studio album: "So far, we've got 10 songs written. We're probably going to do three more, and hopefully start recording by the end of the summer. Then we've got a European tour coming up in November/December, and after that, we've got to finish the record and hopefully get it out sometime early next year."

In October 2022, Nile announced bassist Julian Guillen would join the band for a November/December European tour.

On May 29, 2024, Nile released the song "Chapter for Not Being Hung Upside Down on a Stake in the Underworld and Made to Eat Feces by The Four Apes" from the album The Underworld Awaits Us All, released by Napalm Records on August 23, 2024.

In early 2025, Nile co-headlined a US tour with Six Feet Under. The band played Maryland Deathfest that year. In September 2025, before the band's The Underworld Awaits Tour in the US with Cryptopsy, bassist/vocalist Dan Vadim Von announced on Instagram his departure from the band after two years in the lineup "to focus on other commitments".

== Musical style and lyrics ==
The majority of Nile's music is written by vocalist/guitarist Karl Sanders. It combines traditional and technical death metal. Nile's music is characterized by the technical death metal genre's comparative complexity and speed combined with a riffing style consistent with brutal death metal. Their guitars and bass are typically tuned to dropped A.

Much of the band's music and lyrical content is based on Sanders' interest in Egyptology (mainly inspired by Ancient Egyptian and Near Eastern mysticism, history, religion, and ancient art) and other ancient Middle Eastern cultures, such as Mesopotamia. Extensive sleeve notes are included on all Nile's full-length releases from Black Seeds of Vengeance onwards, with the exception of Ithyphallic, explaining the inspiration or source for the lyrics of each song. According to Sanders, "Every song that gets written is filtered through our own lens and our life experiences. [...] You can’t help it that whatever glasses you’re wearing are going to filter how you look at history."

Sanders also assessed, "If we were using the music of the local area here, it would sound nothing like a Nile album. In a way it’s a form of escapism. There are a lot of Eastern modalities and tonalities adapted into the guitar playing, but it’s not purely authentic because it can’t be. In the same way that the soundtrack for a mummy movie or whatever is not all ancient stuff from 5000 years ago, it’s music that puts you in that mindset, which is a different thing. Are you scoring a Hollywood movie, or being a musical preservation society? We’re a metal band, so we lean towards the ‘Hollywood making a horrific Ancient Egypt movie’ [approach]." Despite the band's heavy use of Eastern tonalities, Sanders also expressed, "It became obvious to us early on that if you put in too many exotic elements, at some point it’s no longer really a metal record. Different Nile albums have had varying levels of extraneous elements to them. [...] It’s always a variable based on what each songs need. It’s the randomness of the universe."

Metal bands Kittie and Suicide Silence cited Nile as an influence.

== Band members ==
Nile Lineup 2025

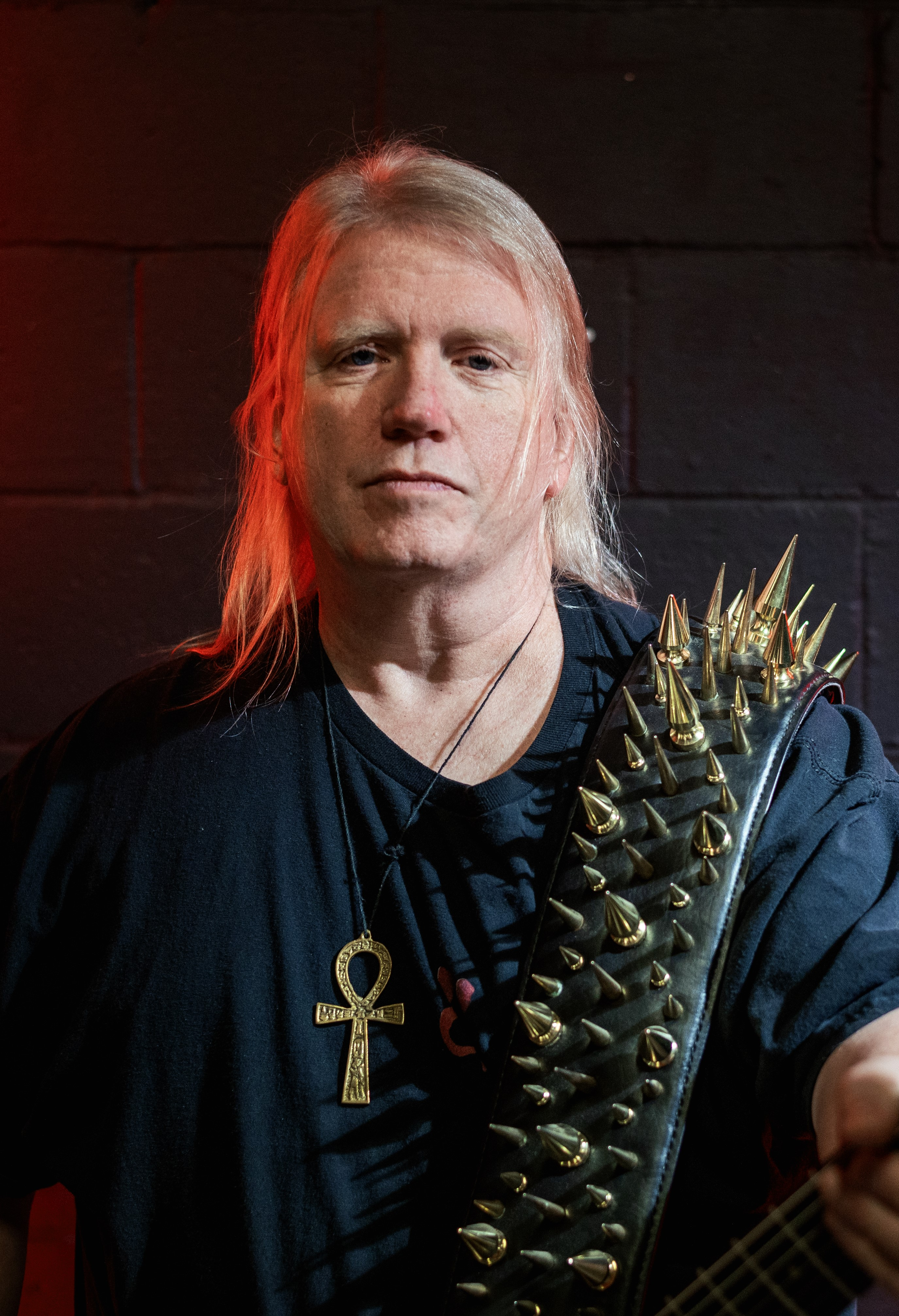
Karl Sanders

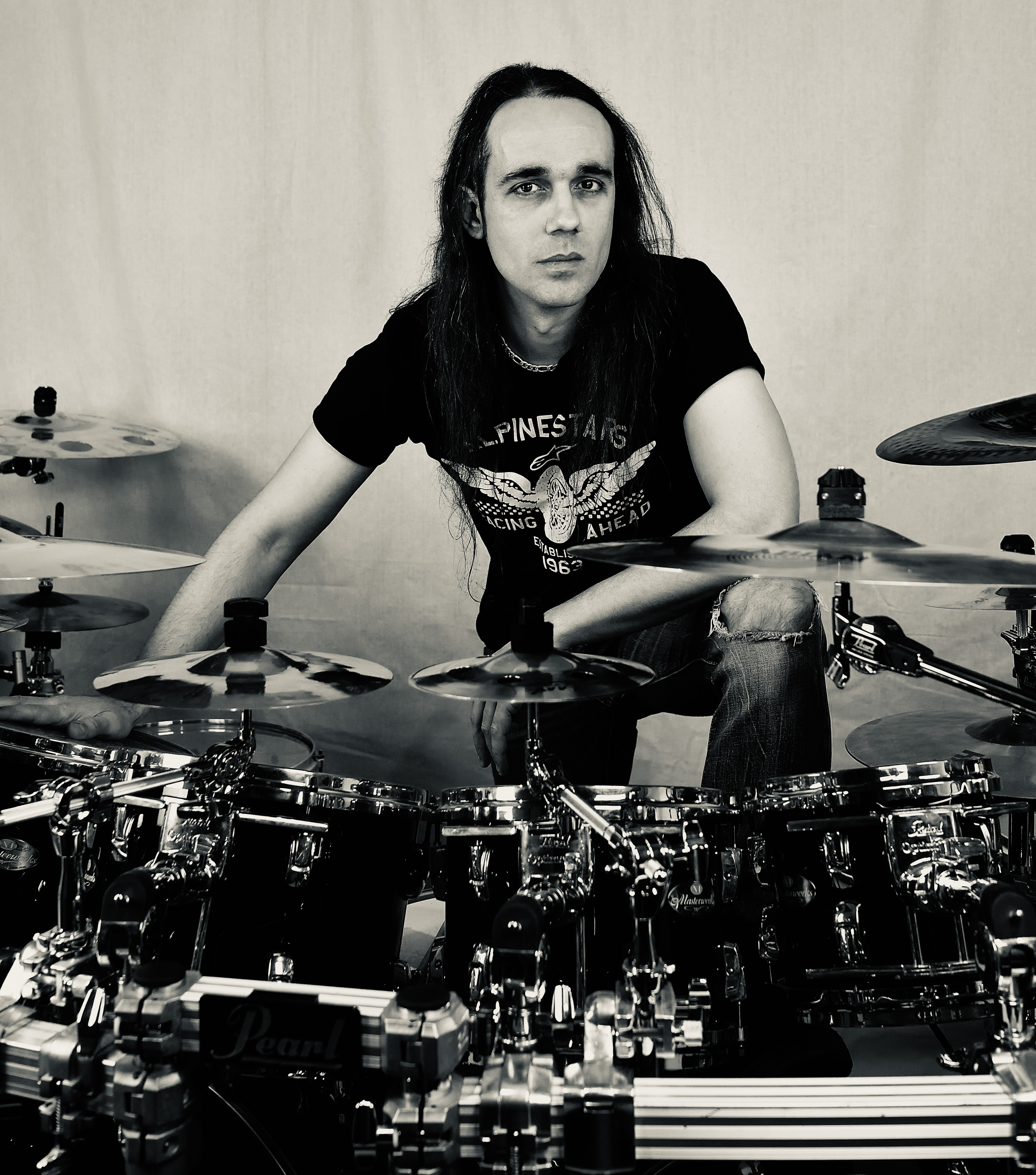
George Kollias

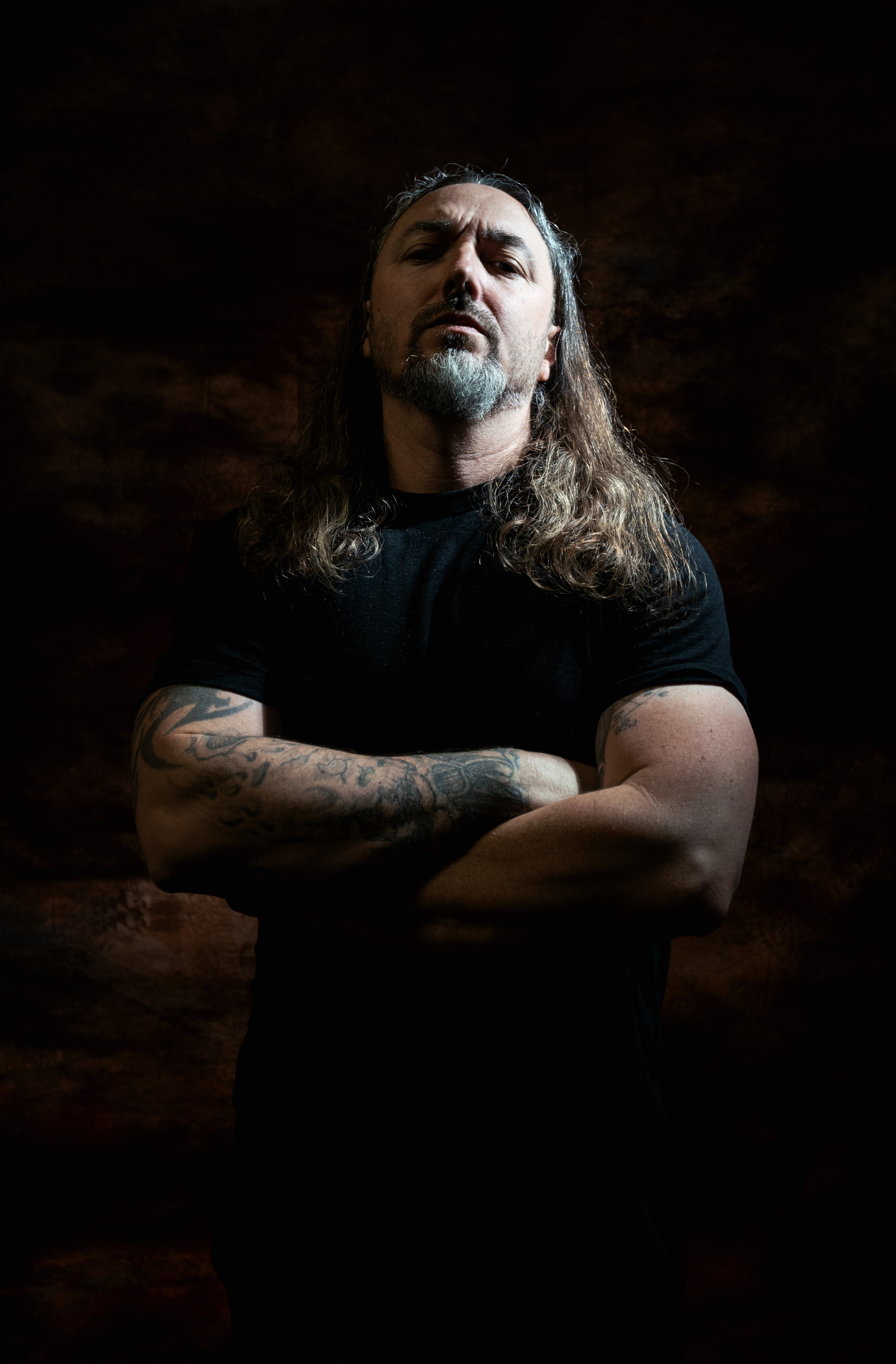
Brian Kingsland

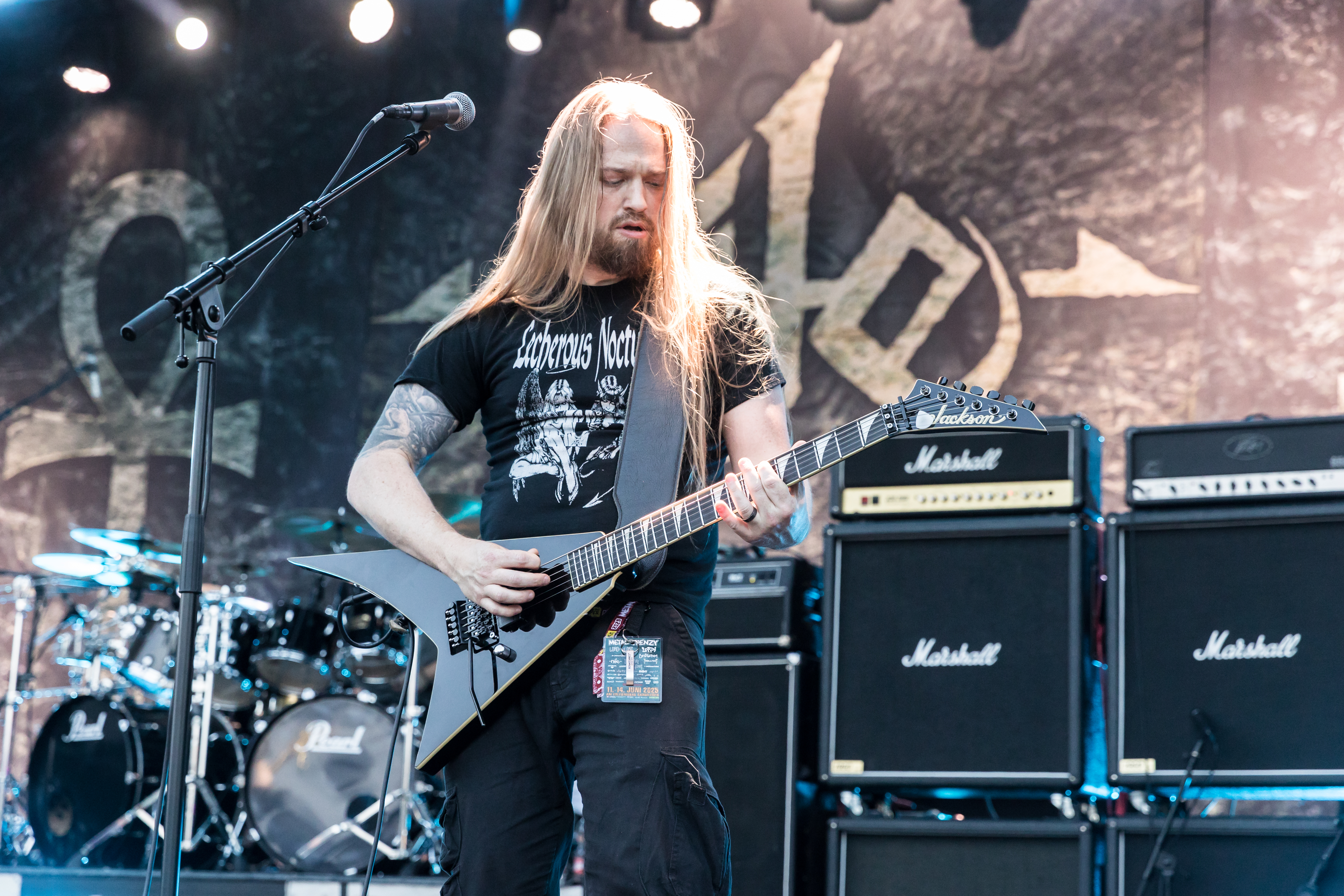
Zach Jeter

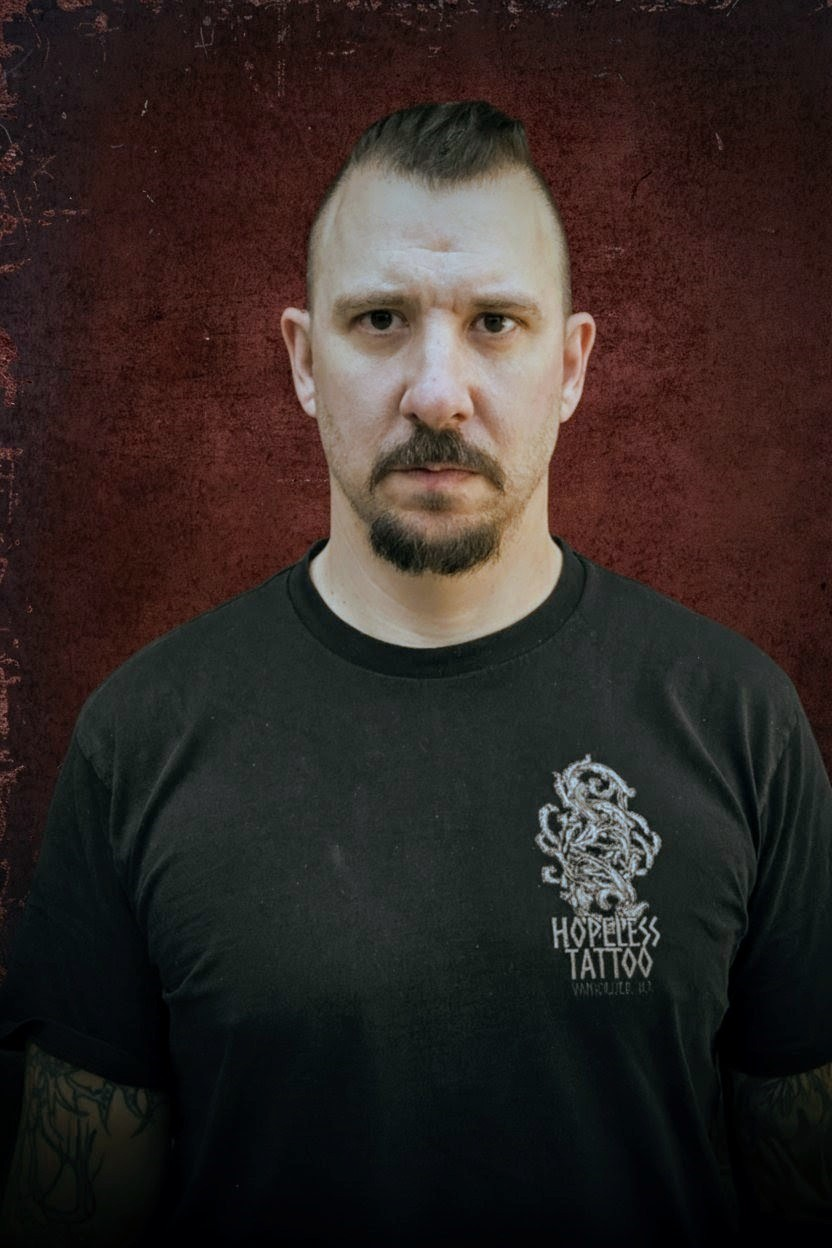
Adam Roethlisberger

Current

- Karl Sanders – guitars (1993–present), vocals, keyboards (1995–present)
- George Kollias – drums (2004–present)
- Brian Kingsland – guitars, vocals (2017–present; studio only since 2022)
- Zach Jeter – guitars, vocals (2023–present)
- Adam Roethlisberger – bass, vocals (2025–present)

Former

- Chief Spires – bass, vocals (1993–2001)
- Pete Hammoura – drums, vocals (1993–2000)
- John Ehlers – guitars (1996–1997)
- Dallas Toler-Wade – guitars, vocals (1997–2016)
- Tony Laureano – drums (2000–2004)
- Jon Vesano – bass, vocals (2001–2005)
- Chris Lollis – bass, vocals (2007–2012)
- Todd Ellis – bass, vocals (2012–2015)
- Brad Parris – bass, vocals (2015–2022)
- Dan Vadim Von – bass, vocals (2023–2025)

Session and live

- Derek Roddy – drums (2000)
- Tim Yeung – drums (2003)
- Steve Tucker – bass, vocals (2005)
- Joe Payne – bass, vocals (2005–2007; died 2020)
- Josh Crouse – live session vocals (2018)
- Scott Eames – guitars, vocals (2021–2023)
- Julian David Guillen – bass, vocals (2022–2023)

Timeline

== Discography ==
Studio albums

- Amongst the Catacombs of Nephren-Ka (1998)
- Black Seeds of Vengeance (2000)
- In Their Darkened Shrines (2002)
- Annihilation of the Wicked (2005)
- Ithyphallic (2007)
- Those Whom the Gods Detest (2009)
- At the Gate of Sethu (2012)
- What Should Not Be Unearthed (2015)
- Vile Nilotic Rites (2019)
- The Underworld Awaits Us All (2024)
