= Karl Sanders =

American singer and guitarist

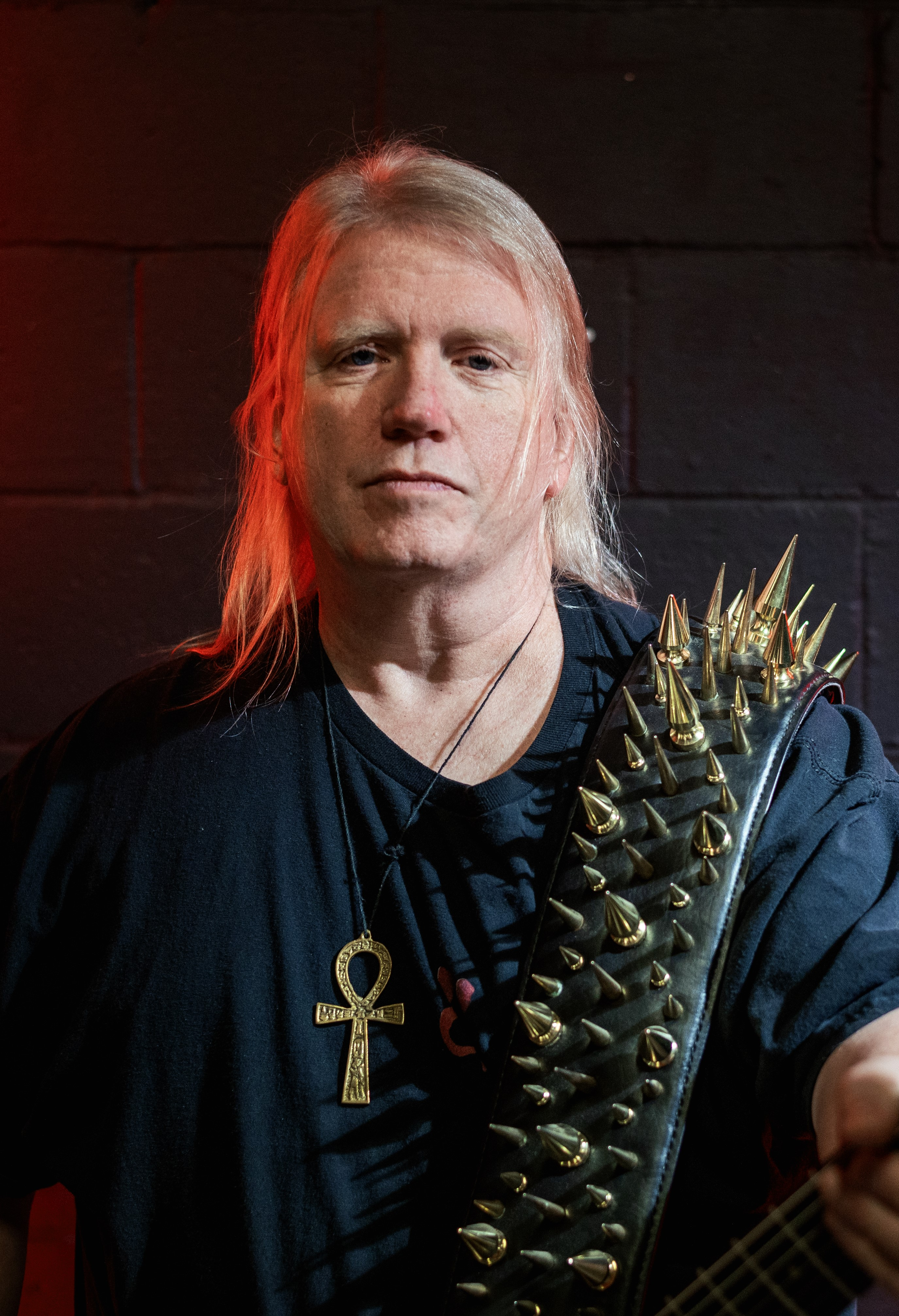
- Sanders in 2024

Background information
- Born: June 5, 1963 (age 63); San Francisco, California, U.S.
- Genres: Technical death metal; thrash metal; folk; ambient; post-rock
- Occupation: Musician
- Instruments: Guitar, vocals
- Years active: Late 1980s – present
- Member of: Nile
- Formerly of: Morriah

Karl Sanders (born June 5, 1963) is an American vocalist and guitarist who is a founding member of the technical death metal band Nile.

== Early life ==
Sanders started playing guitar when he was nine years old. Before creating Nile, Sanders was in a thrash metal band during the late 1980s called Morriah and played local shows with the young Morbid Angel and other US death metal bands. He said, "The 80s were a lot of fun. It was a time where everybody had disposable income so everybody was always going out. There were half a dozen places to play in my home town. You could have quite the life playing four nights a week, even as a cover band, but after a while we wanted to write our own songs."

== Career ==
=== Other projects ===
Sanders began his own solo side project in 2004. Much of the music that he plays includes similar elements of his band Nile, however presented in an ambient/Egyptian folk format, rather than death metal. Sanders explained that "he got sick of hearing big loud death metal everyday after touring", and started writing quieter music to relax, and recorded them.

His first solo full-length album, Saurian Meditation, was released in October 2004 under the Relapse record label. A second solo album, Saurian Exorcisms, was released in April 2009. In May 2022, he announced his third solo album, Saurian Apocalypse, would be released on July 22.

=== Guest appearances ===
Sanders guested on Behemoth's 2004 album Demigod, playing a guitar solo on the track "XUL". He also performed a guitar solo at the end of the track "God of Our Own Divinity" by Morbid Angel, on their 2003 album Heretic, as well as a solo on the song "The Final War (Battle of Actium)" on Ex Deo's 2009 album Romulus. Sanders also played on Grave's 2010 album Burial Ground on the tracks "Bloodtrail" and "Naafa". Sanders traveled to Dubai to collaborate on guest vocals for Nervecell's song "Shunq (To the Despaired... King of Darkness)" on their 2011 album Psychogenocide. On Tourniquet's 2012 album Antiseptic Bloodbath, Sanders contributed a guitar solo to the track "Chamunda Temple Stampede". Sanders was also featured in episode one of Rusty Cooley's and Zachary Adkins' podcast "Guitar Autopsy" available on YouTube. In 2017 Sanders traveled to Egypt to collaborate with Nader Sadek, Derek Roddy, and Mahmud Gecekusu on The Serapeum EP In 2018, Sanders did a guest solo on the song "Sacred War of Lawlessness" for Polish blackened death metal band Veld. Sanders provided lead guitars for THŪN's self-titled EP in 2021.

=== Legacy and influence ===
Sanders is recognized as a pioneering figure in technical death metal. In 1998, Nile’s breakout album Amongst the Catacombs of Nephren-Ka blended Middle Eastern influences with extreme metal, helping revive interest in the genre during a period of decline.

He is often credited, alongside bands like Cryptopsy and Origin, with pushing the boundaries of speed, complexity, and conceptual storytelling in death metal.

=== Recognition and rankings ===
Sanders has received recognition in several fan and magazine polls. Decibel magazine ranked him fourth in its list of the "Top 20 Death Metal Guitarists of All Time". In the 2007 Terrorizer readers’ poll, he was voted Best Musician. He was also ranked the fifth best modern metal guitarist in a readers’ poll conducted by Metal Sucks.

== Artistry ==
Sanders assessed his creative process and mindset: "Basically, if you’re a guitar player, there’s riffs that are going to come out. It just happens. It’s part of it. [...] It’s [just] not necessarily an endless well, and not every riff that we come up with manages to make its way into a song. That is where it comes from; we love to play music, so we’re always riffing. But, as soon as you try to dictate to the muse, it goes away. You can’t force yourself to be creative. You can be disciplined and work on your craft every day. [...] Not always is gold just gonna fall out of the sky, like when you hear a Nile record. [...] No, those songs took years to put together. A lot of blood, sweat, and tears went into taking the inspiration that we had and crafting it into something."

Speaking to his practice regimen to build both stamina and precision in his picking and riffing, Sanders has said, “I am playing guitar all fucking day long, practicing my ass off all the time.”

== Personal life and beliefs ==
He has a son named Kael, who appeared as a guest vocalist on Nile's 2019 album Vile Nilotic Rites.

Karl Sanders used to play tennis regularly with original Nile drummer Pete Hammoura, and is now an avid pickleball player.

Sanders owned a beagle-mix named Nova, who lived for 16 years. Nova worked as a therapy dog for several years through volunteer work led by Sanders' wife, visiting patients at Shriner's Children's Hospital, inpatient rehabilitation centers, and mental health facilities.

After Nova's death, Sanders began fostering rescue dogs. In 2025, he shared posts about fostering dogs through Lucky Pup Rescue SC, and visiting SOS Beagle Rescue in Knoxville, Tennessee.

Sanders' fascination with ancient history began in fourth grade with a book report on Alexander the Great, further fueled by watching epic films like Ben Hur and The Ten Commandments with his father.

== Discography ==
Release date	Album details	Label	Format
October 26, 2004	Saurian Meditation	Relapse Records	CD
April 14, 2009	Saurian Exorcisms	The End Records	CD
July 22, 2022	Saurian Apocalypse	Napalm Records	CD, vinyl, digital download, cassette
