= Nevermore discography =

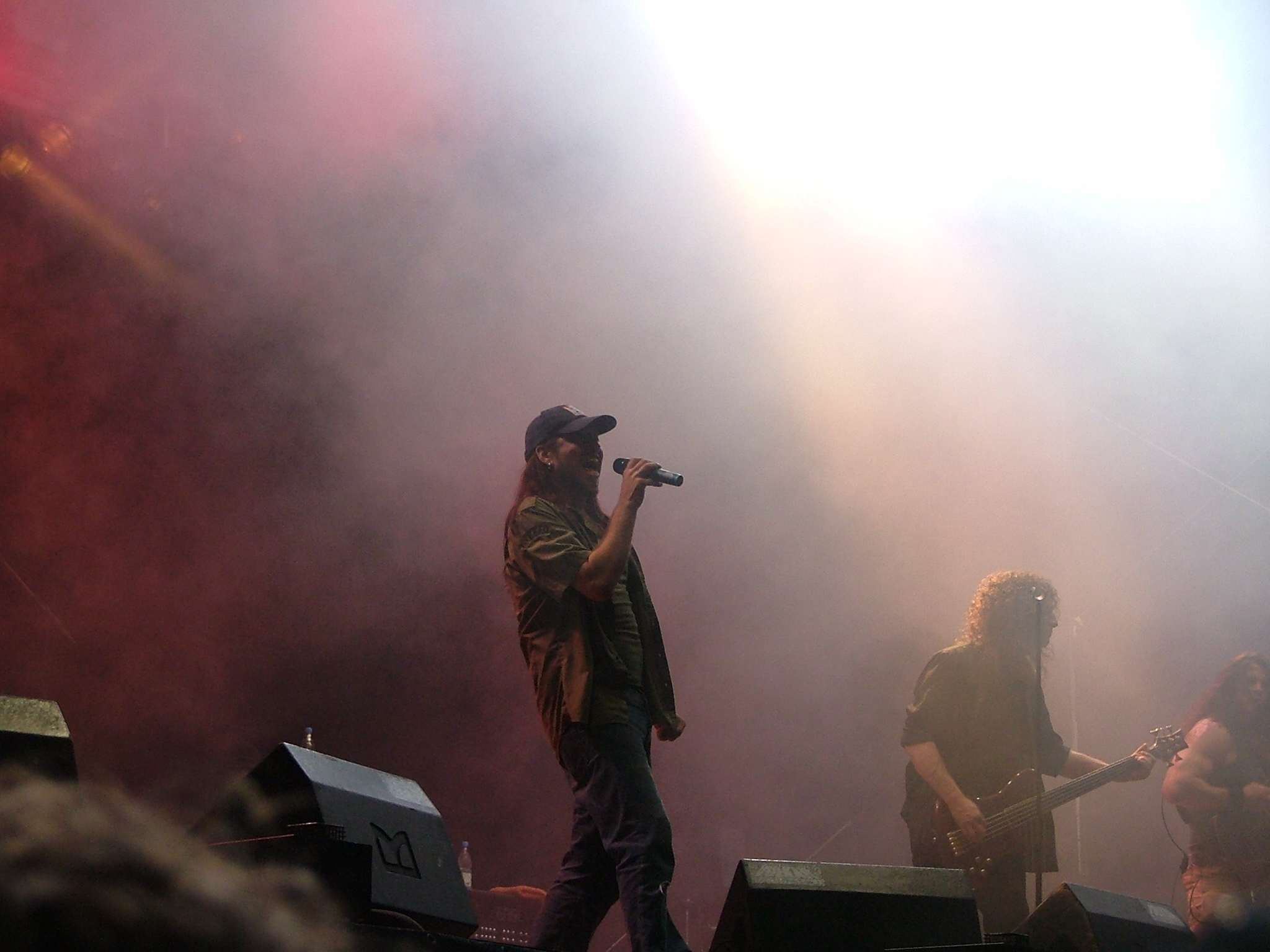
- Nevermore performing in 2007
- Studio albums: 7
- Extended plays: 1
- Live albums: 1
- Compilation albums: 1
- Singles: 1
- Video albums: 1
- Music videos: 9
- Demo albums: 2

The discography of Nevermore, a heavy metal band from Seattle, Washington, consists of seven studio albums, one live album, one extended play, one compilation album, two demos, one single, one video album, and nine music videos.

== Studio albums ==
Year	Album details	Peak chart positions										Sales
Year	Album details	US	US Heat.	US Ind.	AUT	BEL	FRA	GER	NED	SWI	UK	Sales
1995	Nevermore: Release: February 14, 1995; Label: Century Media; Formats: CD	—	—	—	—	—	—	—	—	—	—	
1996	The Politics of Ecstasy: Release: November 5, 1996; Label: Century Media; Formats: CD	—	—	—	—	—	—	—	—	—	—	US: 9,648+
1999	Dreaming Neon Black: Release: January 26, 1999; Label: Century Media; Formats: CD	—	—	—	—	—	—	80	—	—	—	US: 18,302+
2000	Dead Heart in a Dead World: Release: October 17, 2000; Label: Century Media; Formats: CD	—	—	—	—	—	—	57	—	—	—	US: 30,000+
2003	Enemies of Reality: Release: July 29, 2003; Label: Century Media; Formats: CD	—	11	19	—	—	130	34	87	—	—	US: 24,000+
2005	This Godless Endeavor: Release: July 26, 2005; Label: Century Media; Formats: CD, LP	—	27	23	—	—	134	26	73	63	—	US: 5,000+
2010	The Obsidian Conspiracy: Release: June 8, 2010; Label: Century Media; Formats: CD	132	1	18	34	87	108	13	69	40	195	US: 4,000+
"—" denotes a release that did not chart.

== Live albums ==
Year	Album details
2008	The Year of the Voyager: Release: October 20, 2008; Label: Century Media; Formats: CD, LP

== Compilation albums ==
Year	Album details
2009	Manifesto of Nevermore: Release: March 2, 2009; Label: Century Media; Formats: CD

== Demo albums ==
Year	Album details
1992	Utopia: Release: 1992; Label: Independent; Formats: CD, cassette
1994	Demo 1994: Release: 1994; Label: Self-released; Formats: CD, cassette

== Extended plays ==
Year	Album details	Sales
1996	In Memory: Release: July 23, 1996; Label: Century Media Records; Formats: CD	US: 4,948+

== Singles ==
Year	Title	Album
2000	"Believe in Nothing"	Dead Heart in a Dead World

== Video albums ==
Year	Album details
2008	The Year of the Voyager: Release: October 20, 2008; Label: Century Media Records; Formats: DVD

== Music videos ==
Year	Title	Directed	Album
1995	"What Tomorrow Knows"	Brian Johnson	Nevermore
1996	"Next in Line"	Glenn Fricker	The Politics of Ecstasy
2000	"Believe in Nothing"	Glenn Fricker	Dead Heart, in a Dead World
2003	"I, Voyager"	Kevin Leonard	Enemies of Reality
2003	"Enemies of Reality"	Zack Merck	Enemies of Reality
2005	"Final Product"	Kevin Leonard	This Godless Endeavor
2005	"Born"	Derek Dale	This Godless Endeavor
2008	"Narcosynthesis"	Michael Cao	Dead Heart, in a Dead World
2010	"Emptiness Unobstructed"	Nigel Crane	The Obsidian Conspiracy
