= Manifesto of Nevermore =

Greatest hits album by Nevermore
- Released: March 2, 2009
- Recorded: 1995–2008
- Genres: Progressive metal, heavy metal, thrash metal, power metal
- Label: Century Media Records

Nevermore chronology
The Year of the Voyager (2008)	Manifesto of Nevermore (2009)	The Obsidian Conspiracy (2010)

Manifesto of Nevermore is a greatest hits compilation by American heavy metal band Nevermore. It contains tracks from the first six Nevermore albums as well as their In Memory EP in reverse chronological order except one song taken from their double DVD/CD live album The Year of the Voyager released in 2008 as the last track on the compilation. It was released in Europe and the UK on March 2, 2009.

== Track listing ==
Manifesto of Nevermore
No.	Title	Album	Length
1.	"Final Product"	This Godless Endeavor	4:22
2.	"Born"	This Godless Endeavor	5:05
3.	"Enemies of Reality"	Enemies of Reality	5:11
4.	"Tomorrow Turned into Yesterday"	Enemies of Reality	4:35
5.	"Believe in Nothing"	Dead Heart in a Dead World	4:22
6.	"Narcosynthesis"	Dead Heart in a Dead World	5:31
7.	"Dreaming Neon Black"	Dreaming Neon Black	6:26
8.	"Beyond Within"	Dreaming Neon Black	5:12
9.	"Next in Line"	The Politics of Ecstasy	5:32
10.	"The Seven Tongues of God"	The Politics of Ecstasy	5:59
11.	"Matricide"	In Memory	5:21
12.	"What Tomorrow Knows"	Nevermore	5:12
13.	"The Heart Collector" (live)	The Year of the Voyager	6:45

== Personnel ==
- Warrel Dane – lead vocals
- Jeff Loomis – lead guitar
- Pat O'Brien – guitar (tracks 9–12)
- Tim Calvert – guitar (tracks 7–8)
- Steve Smyth – guitar (tracks: 1–2)
- Chris Broderick – guitar (track 13)
- Jim Sheppard – bass
- Van Williams – drums
