= Zero Order Phase =

- The cover of Zero Order Phase is inspired by science fiction films such as Blade Runner and Logan's Run

Studio album by Jeff Loomis
- Released: September 30, 2008
- Studio: Robert Lang (Shoreline, Washington)
- Genres: Instrumental rock, progressive metal, neo-classical metal
- Length: 54:02
- Label: Century Media
- Producer: Neil Kernon

Jeff Loomis chronology
| Zero Order Phase (2008) | Plains of Oblivion (2012) |

Professional ratings
Review scores
| Source | Rating |
|---|---|
| About.com | 3/5 stars |
| Allmusic | 3.5/5 stars |
| Blabbermouth.net | 8.5/10 stars |

Zero Order Phase is the debut solo album by former Nevermore guitarist Jeff Loomis. It was released on September 30, 2008, through Century Media Records. The album was produced by Neil Kernon and features guest appearances by guitarists Ron Jarzombek, Pat O'Brien, and the jazz bassist Michael Manring. An instrumental album, Zero Order Phase was recorded in March 2008 at Robert Lang Studios in Seattle, Washington. In addition to Loomis on guitar, keyboards and bass, the album features ex-Nevermore member Mark Arrington on drums.

== History ==
These are just instrumentals. I really had no intention on having a lot of meaning behind the titles. I really just want the fans or fans of this type of music to enjoy the songs for what they are on their own.

— Jeff Loomis, Ice Vajal

Jeff Loomis explained in an interview that the album had been written after the end of This Godless Endeavor tour. Loomis wrote two months before starting production. Zero Order Phase was recorded during a month and a half, at the Robert Lang Studios in Richmond Beach, Washington, with producer Neil Kernon and featuring the former Nevermore drummer, Mark Arrington. The choice of Kernon to produce the album had been made several years before while both he and Loomis were working on the third Nevermore album Dreaming Neon Black. Loomis told Kernon that "if I ever did a solo project he would produce it." During the recordings Loomis commented about the album's production, saying: "Being able to do this entire recording with Neil [Kernon] is really amazing as well. We've done some great work in the past, but being able to focus on an entire instrumental record is going to be great".

The album also features several guest appearances. Ron Jarzombek splits solos with Loomis on "Jato Unit", former Nevermore bandmate Pat O'Brien-who joined Cannibal Corpse after recording The Politics of Ecstasy-on "Race Against Disaster", jazz musician Michael Manring on "Cashmere Shiv" and producer Kernon playing a fretless guitar solo on the same track. As Loomis explained in an interview with Komodo Rock, because the guest musicians lived in different parts of the United States, he e-mailed recordings of the rhythm guitar and drums. Each guest recorded his solos at his own home studio and sent the tracks back to Loomis in Seattle.

== Critical reception ==
Zero Order Phase was described as "a good instrumental guitar CD" by About.com reviewer Chad Bowar. He also praised Loomis stating: "excellent guitar skills [...] technical riffs, creative solos and nonstop shredding". Ryan Ogle of Blabbermouth.net said the album was "one goddamned fiery tribute to the instrumental shred lords that have inspired his [Jeff Loomis] playing".

Eduardo Rivadavia of Allmusic wrote: "guitarist Jeff Loomis has unearthed the instrumental guitar hero template that was briefly made popular by Joe Satriani in the late '80s and early '90s," he also stated that "tracks like 'Shouting Fire at a Funeral,' 'Jato Unit,' and 'Devil Theory' are entrenched in the metallic music ingredients he [Jeff Loomis] is renowned for." 'Azure Haze' and 'Sacristy', were defined as "sweeping ballads"; on the last one, Loomis was again compared with Joe Satriani, Rivadavia stated: "admittedly very Satriani-esque."

== Track listing ==
All music is composed by Jeff Loomis.

| No. | Title | Length |
|---|---|---|
| 1. | "Shouting Fire at a Funeral" | 4:54 |
| 2. | "Opulent Maelstrom" | 6:07 |
| 3. | "Jato Unit" | 4:41 |
| 4. | "Azure Haze" | 4:59 |
| 5. | "Cashmere Shiv" | 6:16 |
| 6. | "Race Against Disaster" | 6:13 |
| 7. | "Sacristy" | 4:50 |
| 8. | "Devil Theory" | 6:16 |
| 9. | "Miles of Machines" | 5:45 |
| 10. | "Departure" | 3:56 |
| 11. | "Omega's Influence" (Japanese Bonus Track) | 5:01 |

== Personnel ==
- Jeff Loomis – guitar, bass, keyboards, programming
- Neil Kernon – keyboards, programming, producer, engineer, string arrangements, mixing, fretless guitar solo on "Cashmere Shiv"
- Mark Arrington – drums, percussion
- Ron Jarzombek – guitar solo on "Jato Unit"
- Pat O'Brien – guitar solo on "Race Against Disaster"
- Michael Manring – bass on "Cashmere Shiv"
- Alan Douches – mastering
- Brian Valentino – assistant engineer
- Stephanie Cabral – photography
