= Enemies of Reality =

Studio album by Nevermore
- Released: July 29, 2003
- Recorded: 2003
- Studios: The House of Rock & Metalworks, Seattle, Washington
- Genres: Thrash metal, progressive metal
- Length: 40:49
- Label: Century Media
- Producers: Kelly Gray (original); Andy Sneap (2005 reissue)

Nevermore chronology
Dead Heart in a Dead World (2000)	Enemies of Reality (2003)	This Godless Endeavor (2005)

Enemies of Reality is the fifth studio album by American heavy metal band Nevermore, released in 2003 by Century Media. Due to the mixed reception of the album's production by Kelly Gray, it was remixed and remastered by Andy Sneap in 2005.

== Overview ==
The worms on the album cover are a direct reference to the lyrics of the title track, "Enemies of Reality", in which Warrel Dane sings, "Open wide and eat the worms of the enemy." There are other lyric-inspired images in the booklet, namely an open hand holding a glowing sun (taken from "Ambivalent", where the lyrics say "The sun in my hand becomes my despair"). At the beginning of the song, there is message played backwards that repeats the pre-chorus "We are the useless by-product of soulless meat."

On the last page of the CD booklet is a dedication to the late Death frontman Chuck Schuldiner, which reads: "This record is dedicated to Chuck. Let the metal flow into eternity..."

The track "Noumenon" is named after the philosophical concept of things as they actually are, as compared to the concept of phenomenon, which is how things appear. The term was popularized by Immanuel Kant, who used it to help explain his philosophy of transcendental idealism.

== Background ==
Enemies of Reality was written and recorded during a time of personal and professional tumult for the members of Nevermore. Warrel Dane attributes the sound of the album to the challenges that the band members faced during this period: "Enemies Of Reality was a difficult album to make. We were all going through a difficult time in our lives. We were all really fucking angry people, and I think that kind of shows on that album."

Among the professional challenges that the band faced was that Enemies of Reality was the final album in the band's inaugural recording contract with Century Media. This interfered with the album's creation in an audible way, with the recording budget for Enemies of Reality becoming an aspect of the negotiations. However, Dane's description of the situation indicates that both band and label were tough in their negotiating positions:

Basically, they [Century Media] wanted us to re-sign and do a new contract before our old one was done and we didn't want to do that. We wanted to fulfil our original contract and then go on from there because there were a number of labels that were interested in working with us. [...] We were playing hardball back and forth with the label and that's why that record ... it was a difficult period for us. We were all pretty pissed off and angry and that shows in the music. Our budget got slashed for that record just because of the fact that we had not re-signed. I think it came down to "Well, re-sign now or this is your budget because that's what it says in your contract." You can't argue with that. We didn't re-sign. We didn't buckle under and I think it paid off in the end because we got what we wanted [for our next contract]. We got everything that we wanted in our new record deal ... everything that we've worked ten fucking years for and deserve, we got. We learned how to play the game and we played it very well.

== Production controversy ==
Enemies of Reality is infamous for its production by Kelly Gray, which was criticized as being inferior to the quality of previous albums. Speaking in 2003, contemporaneous with the initial release, Jeff Loomis spoke with qualified favour of the recording:

[Kelly Gray is] more of a pop producer kind of guy. He's worked with Candlebox before and sold millions of albums with them, so working with us, we were kind of like his lab rats, you know? He's never really done a metal band before but overall I think he did a pretty fantastic job. He got a real live quality out of us because we were always used to doing drums first and then the bass, and then the guitar and then the vocals at the very end. This time we recorded most of the songs live with the whole band and then after one song was done, Warrel would immediately sing on it [instead] of saving all of [the singing] to the very end, which kind of saves his voice in the overall recording process. I guess the whole album was done in a very different atmosphere and aspect that sounds really good.

By 2005, however, Loomis had soured on the recording. Moreover, he directly attributed the shortfall in the album's sonics to budgetary constraints related to the contract negotiations then ongoing with Century Media:

We were at the end of our recording contract with Century Media, and basically they didn't know if we were going to re-sign with them, so they gave us a very small budget for our last album to work with. That was about $20,000 which is a nothing deal to do a record. What we needed to do at the time was to find a producer that was immediately available to make a record with such a small budget, and that guy was Kelly Gray (laughs). Unfortunately, he was just not the right guy to do this album."

That year, Enemies of Reality was remixed by Andy Sneap, who produced Nevermore's Dead Heart in a Dead World and would later produce This Godless Endeavor, mix and master The Year of the Voyager, and mix and master The Obsidian Conspiracy. The remixed/remastered sound was received more positively. Warrel Dane admitted that "The remix of the album[...]obviously sounds better. But to me, that's the really odd thing about that album. I find it really strange that the production on that album got reviewed more than the songs did."

== Reception ==
Professional ratings
Review scores
Source	Rating
AllMusic	4/5 stars
Chronicles of Chaos	10/10
Sea of Tranquillity	4.5/5 stars
Rock Hard	9/10 stars

Enemies of Reality received mostly positive reviews. Deadtime.com praised the album's "heavy, technical thrash" while criticizing the band for "including no less than three ballads on a nine song album [that] would have been better left in the rehearsal room if it meant three more barnstormers like 'Never Purify' or 'Ambivalent.'" While KNAC.com lauded the album as Nevermore's "most accessible, catchy, infinitely memorable recording to date," author Eden Capwell lambasted the production for being "a shroud" giving the impression of "two-dimensional flatness".

== Track listing ==
All tracks are written by Jeff Loomis and Warrel Dane.

Enemies of Reality
No.	Title	Length
1.	"Enemies of Reality"	5:11
2.	"Ambivalent"	4:12
3.	"Never Purify"	4:03
4.	"Tomorrow Turned into Yesterday"	4:35
5.	"I, Voyager"	5:48
6.	"Create the Infinite"	3:38
7.	"Who Decides"	4:15
8.	"Noumenon"	4:37
9.	"Seed Awakening"	4:30

=== Bonus videos (2005 reissue) ===
1. "I, Voyager" (video) – 4:42
2. "Enemies of Reality" (video) – 3:58
3. "Enemies of Reality" (live at Wacken 2004) – 4:50

=== Limited edition DVD track list ===
1. "Believe in Nothing" (video)
2. "Next in Line" (video)
3. "What Tomorrow Knows" (video)
4. "Engines of Hate" (live U.S. 2001)
5. "Beyond Within" (live U.S. 2001)

== Personnel ==
=== Nevermore ===
- Warrel Dane – vocals
- Jeff Loomis – guitars
- Jim Sheppard – bass
- Van Williams – drums

=== Production ===
- Kelly Gray – production, engineering, mixing (original version)
- Carl Peterson – assistant engineer
- Eddie Schreyer – mastering (original version)
- Gerald Wilkes – management
- Neil Sussman – legal representation
- Karen Mason-Blair – band photography
- Travis Smith – art, layout

=== 2005 reissue credits ===
- Andy Sneap – remixing, remastering
- Zach Merck – director and producer of "Enemies of Reality" video clip
- Kevin Leonard – director and producer of "I, Voyager" video clip
- Christian Jungebluth – mixing and mastering of "Enemies of Reality" live clip
- Lars Ratz – executive producer for "Enemies of Reality" live clip

== Chart positions ==
Chart (2003)	Peak position
Dutch Albums Chart	87
French Albums Chart	130
