= Dreaming Neon Black =

1999 studio album by Nevermore

Studio album by Nevermore
- Released: January 26, 1999
- Recorded: 1998
- Studio: Village Productions (Tornillo, Texas)
- Genres: Progressive metal, thrash metal, heavy metal
- Length: 66:05
- Label: Century Media
- Producer: Neil Kernon

Nevermore chronology
The Politics of Ecstasy (1996)	Dreaming Neon Black (1999)	Dead Heart in a Dead World (2000)

Alternative cover

Professional ratings
Review scores
Source	Rating
AllMusic	2.5/5 stars
Chronicles of Chaos	10/10
Collector's Guide to Heavy Metal	10/10
Rock Hard	8.5/10
Sputnikmusic	5/5

Dreaming Neon Black is the third studio album by American heavy metal band Nevermore, released in 1999 by Century Media Records. Produced by Neil Kernon, it is the band's only studio album to feature guitarist Tim Calvert, who replaced Pat O'Brien following the release of The Politics of Ecstasy (1996).

A concept album, Dreaming Neon Black follows a man whose psychological state deteriorates after the disappearance of a woman he loved. Its narrative explores grief, guilt, religious disillusionment and insanity, culminating in the protagonist's suicide. The story was inspired by vocalist Warrel Dane's experience of losing contact with a former girlfriend, whose disappearance remained unresolved when the album was recorded.

Musically, the album represented a shift from the intricate arrangements and political themes of The Politics of Ecstasy towards more song-oriented compositions and an emphasis on atmosphere and emotional expression, while retaining Nevermore's mixture of progressive metal, thrash metal and traditional heavy metal. Contemporary reviewers praised its musicianship, songwriting and integration of the music with its narrative.

== Background ==
=== Inspiration ===
Dreaming Neon Black was inspired by Dane's relationship with Patricia Candance Walsh, with whom he had been romantically involved during the 1980s. According to Dane, Walsh became involved with a religious group towards the end of the decade and severed contact with him, reportedly regarding him as evil or satanic.

In 1989, Walsh married Douglas Scott Zyskowski. The couple subsequently left Seattle while travelling towards a religious gathering in Georgia and disappeared.

Several years later, while Nevermore were beginning work on their third album, Dane experienced recurring dreams about Walsh, particularly dreams in which she had drowned. In a contemporary interview, he explained that the unexpected dreams inspired him to write the album's title track and eventually develop a larger story around her disappearance.

Dane later recalled having lived in an end-unit condominium directly overlooking Lake Washington, and said that his proximity to the water had influenced his songwriting. The recurring imagery of water and drowning consequently became an important element of the album's lyrics.

At the time of the album's release in 1999, Dane did not know what had happened to Walsh and believed that she was probably dead. He subsequently explained that the protagonist's fate was fictionalised: whereas Dane had eventually been able to continue with his life, he wanted to explore what might happen to someone unable to recover from a similarly traumatic experience.

In 2003, Walsh's remains were identified. She and Zyskowski had been murdered after encountering serial killer Robert Ben Rhoades in early 1990. Zyskowski's body had been discovered in Texas and identified in 1992, while Walsh's remains had been recovered in Utah in October 1990 but remained unidentified for more than a decade. Rhoades was subsequently linked to their deaths and pleaded guilty to the murders in 2012.

Dane later publicly identified Walsh as the former girlfriend whose disappearance had inspired Dreaming Neon Black. Her actual death, however, was unknown to him when he wrote the album, and its fictional narrative should not be understood as a literal account of the circumstances of her murder.

== Writing and recording ==
=== Composition ===
Following the departure of Pat O'Brien to join Cannibal Corpse, Nevermore recruited Tim Calvert, formerly of Forbidden, as their second guitarist. Calvert's arrival brought a different songwriting approach to the band. In a 1999 interview, Jeff Loomis said that he and Calvert shared similar musical ideas and influences and found it easier to collaborate than he had with O'Brien.

The musicians continued Nevermore's established practice of developing instrumental material collaboratively, with Loomis providing many of the initial guitar ideas. Dane generally wrote lyrics after hearing the music, although the order could vary. He credited bassist Jim Sheppard with writing most of "The Lotus Eaters" and acknowledged Calvert's substantial contributions to the album's compositions.

Loomis subsequently identified Calvert as the composer of "All Play Dead", recalling that much of the album's music developed through spontaneous riff-writing sessions. In another interview, Loomis credited Calvert with writing most of "Deconstruction", while identifying the flamenco-influenced guitar passage before Calvert's solo as his own contribution. Loomis also singled out his guitar solo on "No More Will" and Sheppard's bass performance on "The Lotus Eaters" as highlights of the recording.

Although the album was conceived as a unified narrative, the music was not initially written to follow a predetermined storyline. Dane explained in 1999 that he had proposed recording a concept album, but the other musicians strongly opposed the idea. He consequently continued developing the narrative privately while the band wrote its songs, without informing the others of how the lyrics would eventually connect.

Dane subsequently fitted the developing narrative to the compositions and deliberately left gaps in the storyline that could accommodate changes to the album's track sequence. He revealed the relationship between the songs to the other musicians during the recording sessions. Dane regarded the process as an experiment in whether a coherent concept album could emerge from music written without the other musicians knowing the details of its underlying story.

Looking back in 2016, Dane recalled that the band had spent considerable time writing the album because they were concerned about following the technically demanding The Politics of Ecstasy. He described Dreaming Neon Black as a particularly difficult album to compose, contrasting the experience with the comparatively straightforward creation of its successor, Dead Heart in a Dead World (2000).

=== Recording and production ===
Dreaming Neon Black was recorded in 1998 at Village Productions in Tornillo, Texas, where Nevermore had previously worked on The Politics of Ecstasy and the In Memory EP. Neil Kernon returned as producer, recording engineer and mixing engineer, with additional engineering by Justin Leeah and Bobby Torres. Mastering was credited to Kernon and Raymon Breton.

Loomis attributed the band's continued collaboration with Kernon to their longstanding personal and professional relationship. By this point, Kernon had produced all of Nevermore's releases and was familiar with the musicians' working methods. Loomis considered his knowledge of the band particularly valuable in developing arrangements and obtaining performances in the studio.

Kernon later explained that Dreaming Neon Black had been recorded using analogue equipment, before high-quality multitrack recording with Pro Tools became part of his production workflow. He contrasted its recording methods with the digital approach employed by Andy Sneap on Nevermore's subsequent album, Dead Heart in a Dead World. Kernon also acknowledged that Dane's personal circumstances during the sessions had contributed to the album's dark lyrical atmosphere.

=== Christine Rhoades's contribution ===
The album features additional vocals by Christine Rhoades, also known as Christine Rinehart, on the title track. A longtime friend of Dane's who had performed with bands in Seattle, Rhoades had previously contributed backing vocals to "Garden of Gray" on Nevermore's self-titled debut (1995).

Dane said that he specifically wanted a female voice for "Dreaming Neon Black" because of its narrative. He asked Rhoades to approach the performance as though she were a deceased woman, contrasting her ethereal vocal passages with his own performance. He also remarked on her vocal range and intensity, which he felt were underused in the trip-hop-influenced music she was performing at the time.

According to Calvert, Rhoades did not attend the album's main recording sessions in Texas. Instead, Dane had recorded her vocals separately in Seattle approximately two months earlier, using a four-track recorder. Calvert recalled that the recorded melodies differed in pitch and tempo from the final composition, requiring Kernon to adapt the existing recording to fit the completed track.

Rhoades was also expected to perform with Nevermore at the album's Seattle release concert, but illness prevented her appearance. Pamela Moore, known for portraying Sister Mary on Queensrÿche's Operation: Mindcrime (1988), substituted for her and performed the female vocal passages. Dane later recalled that the performance had been filmed, although he was dissatisfied with the recording's quality.

== Music and concept ==
=== Musical style ===
Although Dreaming Neon Black retained the complex guitar work and progressive metal influences of Nevermore's earlier recordings, the band adopted a more song-oriented approach than on The Politics of Ecstasy. In a contemporary interview, Loomis characterised the album as a departure from its predecessor's more technical arrangements, while Dane said that the band had deliberately shifted its attention towards writing memorable songs rather than maximising the number of instrumental passages.

The album combines aggressive, rhythmically complex compositions with slower passages, acoustic guitars and atmospheric arrangements. The title track makes extensive use of acoustic guitar textures and contrasting vocal performances, while "Deconstruction" incorporates flamenco-influenced guitar playing and "Forever" provides a quieter, largely acoustic conclusion.

In a contemporary review for Lollipop Magazine, Martin Popoff praised the album's integration of technical musicianship with its sombre concept, particularly highlighting its progressive rhythms, acoustic guitars and the title track's atmosphere. He compared aspects of the music to Pink Floyd and Type O Negative.

=== Narrative and lyrical themes ===
The concept of Dreaming Neon Black concerns the progressive psychological deterioration of a man following the disappearance of a woman he loved. Rather than discovering her fate, he remains trapped in uncertainty, alternating between grief, denial, guilt and anger. As his condition worsens, he directs his hostility towards God and religion, questioning the beliefs associated with the woman's disappearance and eventually rejecting them.

Dane described the narrative as a progression through different levels of insanity. He deliberately avoided establishing every event explicitly, explaining that listeners should be able to interpret individual songs independently or understand them as parts of a larger story. He also distinguished the fictional protagonist's psychological collapse from his own ability to recover from the experience that inspired the album.

The album repeatedly employs images of dreams, water and drowning. Within the narrative, dreams offer the protagonist an apparent connection to the missing woman, but also reinforce his inability to escape the loss. Religious imagery likewise develops from pleas for understanding into accusations against God and expressions of spiritual rejection. These themes are particularly prominent in the title track, "Deconstruction" and "No More Will".

The closing track, "Forever", returns to the protagonist's attachment to the missing woman. In a June 1999 interview, Dane explicitly stated that the character commits suicide at the conclusion of the song. He explained the phrase "dreaming neon black" as a metaphor for crossing into the afterlife, giving the album's title its ultimate meaning.

The album opens with the instrumental "Ophidian", which incorporates a spoken-word sample from the 1995 supernatural horror film Lord of Illusions, directed by Clive Barker. Following the musical conclusion of "Forever", an extended period of silence precedes a brief reprise of the opening sample, linking the album's beginning and ending.

== Artwork ==
The album's cover artwork and design were created by Travis Smith, who also contributed photography. Additional photography was credited to Karen Mason-Blair, Louis Rusconi and Brad Gilson Jr.

Dane praised Smith's visual interpretation of the album, particularly the recurring imagery of water. In a 1999 interview, he recalled that Smith had developed some of the artwork without being informed of the full concept. Dane considered the visual similarities to the story particularly striking, including the resemblance of a female model appearing in the artwork to the woman who had inspired the album. After seeing Smith's initial work, he discussed the final cover and other packaging elements with the artist.

== Release and promotion ==
Dreaming Neon Black was released in January 1999 by Century Media Records. The album's promotion included European and North American performances and Nevermore's first headlining tours.

During the album's promotional campaign, Dane said that the band had discussed performing the complete concept album in sequence, although he also emphasised that the songs had been written to function individually. He regarded tracks such as "Dreaming Neon Black", "Poison Godmachine" and "The Fault of the Flesh" as compositions that could be understood without following the entire narrative.

By June 1999, Dane reported that the album was selling more strongly than The Politics of Ecstasy, particularly in Germany, where he estimated an increase of approximately 50 per cent. He also expressed surprise at the favourable response in the United States and said that Century Media had been supportive of the release.

Nevermore toured extensively in support of the album, performing alongside bands including Mercyful Fate, Arch Enemy, Iced Earth and Opeth. The touring cycle continued into 2000, after which Calvert departed and the group returned to a four-piece configuration for Dead Heart in a Dead World.

== Critical reception ==
Dreaming Neon Black received favourable reviews from contemporary heavy metal publications, with particular praise directed towards the album's concept, atmosphere, songwriting and musicianship.

In a review published on 14 March 1999, Adrian Bromley of Chronicles of Chaos awarded the album 10 out of 10. He praised the integration of its narrative with Nevermore's progressive metal arrangements, singling out the performances of Dane, Loomis and Calvert. Bromley highlighted "Poison Godmachine", "No More Will", "The Fault of the Flesh" and the title track, arguing that the album was most effective when heard in its entirety.

Writing for Lollipop Magazine in April 1999, Martin Popoff described the album as an ambitious fusion of heavy metal and narrative storytelling. He praised Dane's emotionally expressive vocals, the complex but natural-sounding instrumental arrangements and the use of acoustic guitars, which he considered particularly effective on the title track.

In the March 1999 issue of In Music We Trust, Jeb Branin praised the album's vocal performances, guitar arrangements and production. He considered the compositions more complex than on the band's previous releases while retaining a direct and forceful musical approach. Branin also highlighted Kernon's production, particularly the clarity of the guitar arrangements and the increased prominence of the rhythm section.

A retrospective review published by Hungarian metal magazine Shock! in February 2024 examined the album's composition, production and lyrical themes on its twenty-fifth anniversary. The reviewers praised its emotional intensity and individual performances, particularly the contributions of Calvert, while also expressing reservations about aspects of its sound and mastering.

== Legacy ==
Dane continued to regard Dreaming Neon Black as one of the most personally significant recordings of his career. In a 2003 interview, he explained that he had avoided developing another concept album for Nevermore because he did not want to diminish the significance of Dreaming Neon Black, whose themes were closely connected to his personal experiences.

In a 2010 interview, Dane identified Dreaming Neon Black as his favourite recording from his entire career and stated that he did not intend to produce another Nevermore album with the same approach.

The album has subsequently been recognised in retrospective reviews for its atmospheric sound and emotionally charged narrative. A twenty-fifth-anniversary assessment by Shock! characterised it as a particularly personal and distinctive work within Nevermore's discography, contrasting its emphasis on songwriting with the more technically elaborate direction of The Politics of Ecstasy.

== Track listing ==
All lyrics are written by Warrel Dane; all music is composed by Jeff Loomis, with "Beyond Within", "Deconstruction", and "All Play Dead" co-written by Tim Calvert.

No.	Title	Length
1.	"Ophidian" (instrumental)	0:46
2.	"Beyond Within"	5:11
3.	"The Death of Passion"	4:10
4.	"I Am the Dog"	4:13
5.	"Dreaming Neon Black"	6:26
6.	"Deconstruction"	6:39
7.	"The Fault of the Flesh"	4:54
8.	"The Lotus Eaters"	4:25
9.	"Poison Godmachine"	4:33
10.	"All Play Dead"	4:58
11.	"Cenotaph"	4:39
12.	"No More Will"	5:45
13.	"Forever"	9:20

Note: The song "Forever" has a run time of 2:35, followed by six minutes and 35 seconds of silence. This silence is followed a 10-second section from the opening track "Ophidian".

== Credits ==
Nevermore

- Warrel Dane – vocals
- Jim Sheppard – bass
- Jeff Loomis – guitars
- Tim Calvert – guitars
- Van Williams – drums

Additional personnel

- Christine Rhoades – additional vocals

Production

- Neil Kernon – production, mixing, mastering
- Justin Leeah – additional engineering
- Bobby Torres – additional engineering
- Raymon Breton – mastering
- Travis Smith – illustrations, design, photography
- Karen Mason-Blair – band photography
- Louis Rusconi – additional photography www.Rusconi.com
- Brad Gilson Jr. - additional photography
