= Jim Sheppard =

American musician (born 1963)

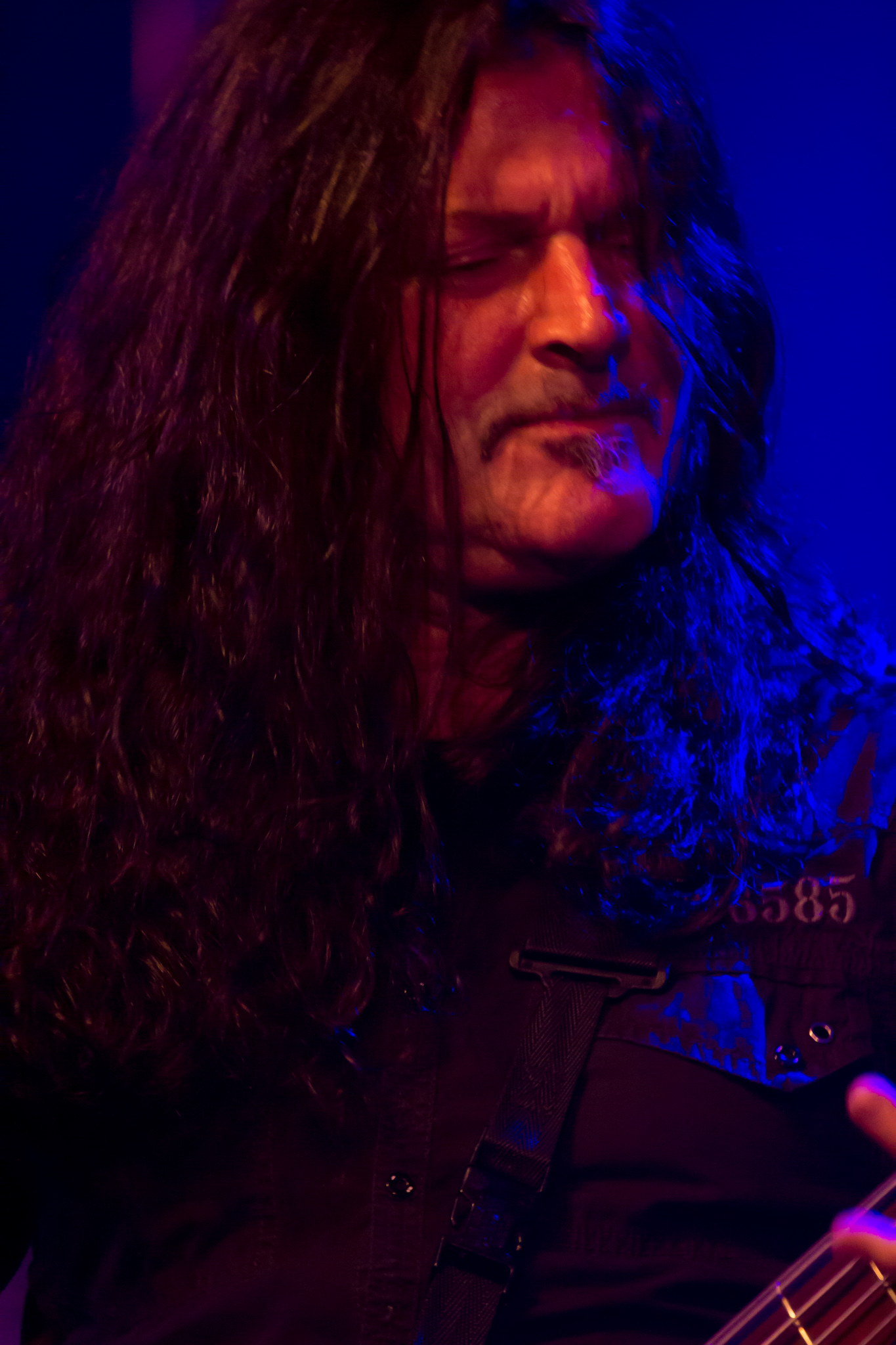
- Jim Sheppard performing with Sanctuary, Barge to Hell 2012

Background information
- Born: Jim Sheppard; May 8, 1961 (age 65)
- Origin: Seattle, Washington, U.S.
- Genres: Progressive metal; power metal; thrash metal
- Occupation: Musician
- Instruments: Bass; guitar
- Years active: 1985–present
- Label: Century Media Records
- Member of: Dead Heart Collective
- Formerly of: Nevermore; Sanctuary

James Patrick Sheppard (born May 8, 1961) is an American musician. He was the bassist and founding member of the progressive metal band, Nevermore, and its predecessor, Sanctuary. He and singer Warrel Dane are certified chefs, and formerly owned an Italian restaurant in Seattle. In 2020 James married Brazilian Priscila Sheppard.

Sheppard underwent an operation in 2011 to remove a benign brain tumour. In 2019, after the death of Warrel Dane, Sheppard started a musical project called Dead Heart Collective, in which he plays guitar.

== Discography ==
=== Sanctuary ===
- Refuge Denied (1987)
- Into the Mirror Black (1989)
- Into the Mirror Live (1991)
- The Year the Sun Died (2014)

=== Nevermore ===
- Nevermore (1995)
- In Memory (EP, 1996)
- The Politics of Ecstasy (1996)
- Dreaming Neon Black (1999)
- Dead Heart in a Dead World (2000)
- Enemies of Reality (2003, remixed/remastered in 2005)
- This Godless Endeavor (2005)
- The Year of the Voyager (2008)
- The Obsidian Conspiracy (2010)
