= Dead Heart in a Dead World =

2000 studio album by Nevermore

Studio album by Nevermore
- Released: October 17, 2000
- Recorded: July 2000
- Studios: Village Productions, Tornillo, Texas, Robert Lang Studios, Seattle, Washington
- Genres: Progressive metal, groove metal, thrash metal
- Length: 56:30
- Label: Century Media
- Producer: Andy Sneap

Nevermore chronology
Dreaming Neon Black (1999)	Dead Heart in a Dead World (2000)	Enemies of Reality (2003)

Dead Heart in a Dead World is the fourth studio album by American heavy metal band Nevermore, released in October 2000. In a style comparable to a darker, heavier Queensrÿche, its songs range from topics such as criticism of drug possession penalties to rejection of religion. The album also features a cover of Simon & Garfunkel's hit, "The Sound of Silence". It is also notable for being Nevermore's first record utilizing seven-string guitars.

== Writing ==
Nevermore began writing the album during the preceding Dreaming Neon Black tour, which ended around late March 2000, and finished the remaining songs before entering the studio. Dane said every song they wrote made it onto the album. He described the previous records as follows: the debut was essentially based on two demos; The Politics of Ecstasy was their first chance to go completely wild with dark, fast, complicated compositions; Dreaming Neon Black was atmospheric, painful and concept-driven; and Dead Heart was deliberately focused on energetic songs that listeners would remember after the album finished.

During composition, Dane would record Loomis's guitar parts onto tape, take them home and listen repeatedly, experimenting with vocal ideas.

Tim Calvert's departure left Dane and Loomis to concentrate more closely on songwriting, which Dane said made the band more focused and improved both of them as songwriters. Loomis later said the album was when Nevermore "really started to change as a band to become better songwriters."

== Production ==
While writing, the band already knew the album needed a different production approach: energetic, extremely heavy, with an aggressive, immediate guitar sound. After discussing how to achieve this with Neil Kernon, they concluded that a different producer would bring "fresh blood," and chose Andy Sneap, who was himself a guitarist.

Dane later said that changing producers made the band nervous, so they recorded at Village Productions in Tornillo, Texas, where they had made In Memory, The Politics of Ecstasy and Dreaming Neon Black. The familiar environment helped them feel grounded.

Around 2000, Loomis had become interested in the heavy low-end guitar tones of bands such as Meshuggah, Fear Factory, and Korn. A friend built him a seven-string guitar with an .080-gauge low string, and the album became Nevermore's first to use seven-string guitars. Loomis later singled out "Evolution 169" as the track where the seven-strings, changed guitar tones and sharper production became apparent, marking a significant step forward for the band's sound.

In Dane's account, Sneap repeatedly pushed Loomis towards more extreme guitar sounds and Dane towards more extreme vocal performances, famously shouting encouragement during vocal takes. Dane rejected the idea that the band were simply borrowing Sneap's experience with bands such as Machine Head, saying that Sneap helped them discover how far their own sound could be pushed without turning them into somebody else. He described the result as combining power, thrash, death, black and other metal elements while remaining difficult to categorise.

Dane remembered the sessions as intense. Sneap pushed performances relentlessly and repeatedly demanded better takes; the musicians were sometimes irritated, but Dane conceded that Sneap was usually right. He also recalled heavy tequila consumption and incidents he declined to describe publicly.

== Music and lyrics ==
Dane considered "Narcosynthesis" particularly representative of what Nevermore were trying to achieve: new sonic elements integrated into their established style. Placing it first on the album was, he said, a risk. Some listeners disliked its modernity and compared it to contemporary bands, but Dane thought this kind of evolution was necessary if metal was to stay alive rather than endlessly reproducing older formulas.

Nevermore's cover of Simon & Garfunkel's "The Sound of Silence" was something Dane had wanted to do for years, as he greatly admired Paul Simon's lyrics, especially their melancholy and darkness. The arrangement itself came about spontaneously in the studio: Loomis started playing the song, apparently as a joke, and Dane immediately began singing. Dane felt it worked instantly, while Loomis was initially sceptical but became enthusiastic within about a week. Dane said the band wanted to dismantle the original and rebuild it as a Nevermore song, as faithfully reproducing another artist's arrangement seemed creatively pointless.

The album featured one single in the track "Believe in Nothing", which was covered by All That Remains on their 2008 album, Overcome. The song was also covered by Firewind in 2008, on the Century Media covers album "Covering 20 Years of Extremes".

The bonus track Chances Three had been previously recorded under the title Three Chances in a 1990 demo by Sanctuary, as well as with its current title in the 1992 Nevermore demo entitled Utopia.

The River Dragon Has Come is based on the 1975 Banqiao Dam failure and the lyrics of the song criticize human errors.

== Legacy ==
At the time, Dane described the album as an intentional risk and a further stage in the band's constant evolution. Loomis later said it was when Nevermore became better songwriters and adopted the heavier seven-string approach he preferred, and in 2026 he still described it as the point where they "found themselves musically and compositionally." He added that the touring that followed lasted roughly three or four years, and that around 2000 constant touring made Nevermore a solid live band.

== Critical reception ==
Professional ratings
Review scores
Source	Rating
AllMusic	4/5 stars
Chronicles of Chaos	9.5/10
Sputnikmusic	4/5
Rock Hard	9.5/10

In 2005, Dead Heart in a Dead World was ranked number 361 in Rock Hard magazine's book of The 500 Greatest Rock & Metal Albums of All Time.

== Track listing ==
All lyrics are written by Warrel Dane except "The Sound of Silence" by Paul Simon; all music is composed by Jeff Loomis except "The Sound of Silence" by Paul Simon and Jeff Loomis.

No.	Title	Length
1.	"Narcosynthesis"	5:31
2.	"We Disintegrate"	5:11
3.	"Inside Four Walls"	4:39
4.	"Evolution 169"	5:51
5.	"The River Dragon Has Come"	5:05
6.	"The Heart Collector"	5:55
7.	"Engines of Hate"	4:42
8.	"The Sound of Silence"	5:13
9.	"Insignificant"	4:56
10.	"Believe in Nothing"	4:21
11.	"Dead Heart in a Dead World"	5:06

Bonus tracks
No.	Title	Writer(s)	Length
12.	"Love Bites" (Judas Priest cover)	Rob Halford, K.K. Downing, Glenn Tipton	5:22
13.	"All the Cowards Hide"		5:56
14.	"Chances Three"		3:03

=== Bonus videos (2012 reissue) ===
1. "Next in Line" (video) - 3:58
2. "What Tomorrow Knows" (video) - 4:36

=== Limited edition live track list ===
1. "The River Dragon Has Come"
2. "Dead Heart in a Dead World"
3. "Inside Four Walls"
4. "Narcosynthesis"
5. "The Heart Collector"
6. "Engines of Hate"

== Personnel ==
Band

- Warrel Dane - vocals
- Jeff Loomis - guitars
- Jim Sheppard - bass
- Van Williams - drums

Other

- Andy Sneap - production, engineering, mixing, mastering
- Justin Leeah - additional engineering
- Bobby Torres - additional engineering
- Travis Smith - illustrations, design, layout
- Karen Mason-Blair - band photography
- Neil Sussman - legal representation

== Charts ==
Chart	Peak position
German Album Charts	57
