= Van Williams (drummer) =

American drummer (born 1966)

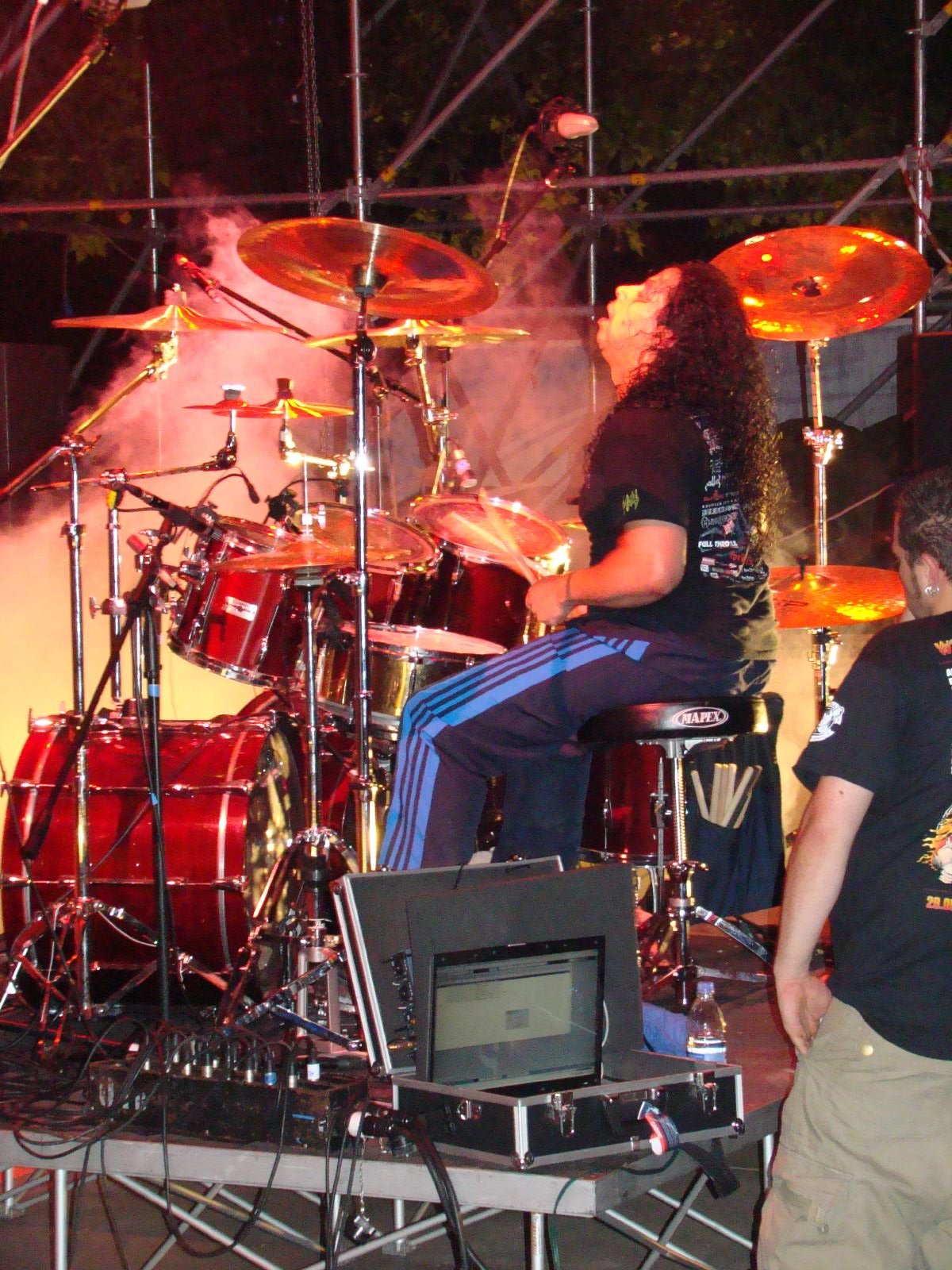
- Williams performing with Nevermore in 2007

Background information
- Born: December 5, 1966 (age 59)
- Origin: New York City, U.S.
- Genres: Progressive metal, power metal, thrash metal
- Occupation: Drummer
- Years active: 1993–present
- Member of: Pure Sweet Hell, Ghost Ship Octavius, Nevermore
- Formerly of: Ashes of Ares, Armageddon

Van Williams (born December 5, 1966) is an American musician, best known as the drummer of heavy metal band Nevermore. He hails from New York where he began his music career in various bands, later relocating to Seattle, Washington in 1993. After auditioning for Nevermore they were soon signed onto Century Media Records. He used to play drums for Ashes of Ares and Armageddon, and as of 2024, he currently drums for Ghost Ship Octavius, musical project Pure Sweet Hell, and Alcatrazz.

== Career ==
=== Nevermore (1994–2011) ===
Williams played drums for Nevermore between 1994 and 2011, playing on all seven of the band's studio releases.

=== After Nevermore (2011–present) ===
Williams continued to play with Nevermore until 2011 when he announced along with Jeff Loomis that he was leaving the band. Also a graphic artist/illustrator, Van has created the logos and numerous T-shirt designs for Nevermore and his other band project Pure Sweet Hell which features Van singing main vocals as well as drums. Pure Sweet Hell also features long time friends and fellow musicians Chris Eichhorn (guitars and bass) and Jim Colson (also supplying vocals). The new Pure Sweet Hell album will feature guitar solos from a few of heavy metal's top shredders, including Glen Drover (Eidolon, Megadeth), Steve Smyth (Nevermore, Testament, Forbidden), Chris Amott (Arch Enemy), Jeff Loomis (Nevermore) and Attila Vörös (Leander, Nevermore). John Winters (Hatefist), also who contributed in the production/engineering of the record. On June 26, 2012, former Iced Earth vocalist Matt Barlow announced on his Facebook page the creation of a new band named Ashes of Ares with former Iced Earth bassist Freddie Vidales and former Nevermore drummer Van Williams, posting on YouTube two one-minute teaser videos. Shortly afterward, Van Williams was also announced as the drummer of Ghost Ship Octavius, featuring former God Forbid guitarist Matt Wicklund and vocalist Adōn Fanion. Ghost Ship Octavius released their debut album on March 23, 2015. In 2024 it was reported that Williams had been welcomed into Graham Bonnet's rendition of Alcatrazz, joining fellow Nevermore alumni Jeff Loomis in the venture.

== Equipment ==
Williams endorses Pearl drums, Sabian cymbals, Toontrack, and ProMark Sticks.

=== Drums: Pearl MMX maple ===
- 10x8" tom
- 12x9" tom
- 13x10" tom
- 13x5.5" snare
- 16x16" floor tom

=== Cymbals: Sabian Cymbals ===
- 22" professional power ride
- 18",20" professional power china
- 8",10" rock splash
- 17",18", rock crash
- 8" raw bell
- 13" rock hats
- 14" regular hats

=== Drum Sticks ===
Promark Naturals 5b

== Discography ==
=== Nevermore ===
- Nevermore (1995)
- In Memory (EP, 1996)
- The Politics of Ecstasy (1996)
- Dreaming Neon Black (1999)
- Dead Heart in a Dead World (2000)
- Enemies of Reality (2003, remixed in 2005)
- This Godless Endeavor (2005)
- The Year of the Voyager (live album, 2008)
- The Obsidian Conspiracy (2010)

=== Pure Sweet Hell ===
- Demo 2002 (2002)
- The Voyeurs of Utter Destruction as Beauty (2005)
- Spitting At The Stars (2011)

=== Ashes of Ares ===
- Ashes of Ares (2013)

=== Ghost Ship Octavius ===
- Ghost Ship Octavius (2015)
- Ghost Ship Octavius Delirium (2018)
