= Pat O'Brien (guitarist) =

American guitarist

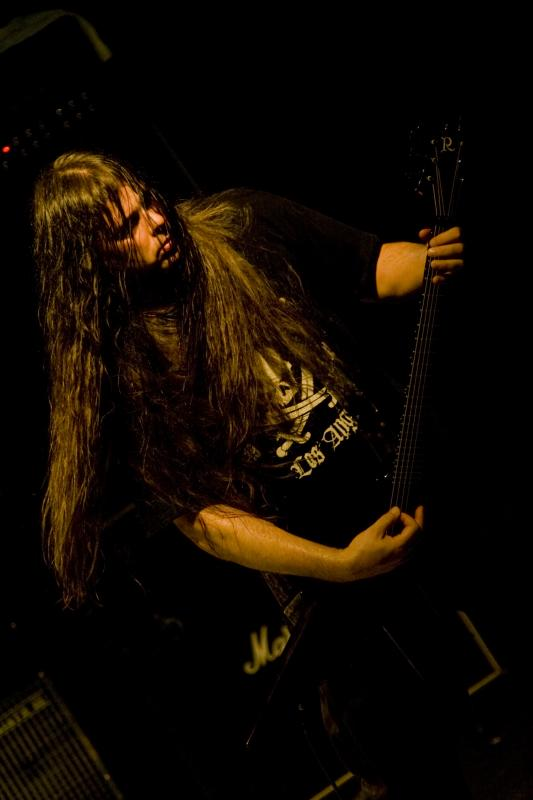
- O'Brien performing with Cannibal Corpse in 2010

Background information
- Born: Patrick Quinn O'Brien; May 17, 1965 (age 61); Boone County, Kentucky, U.S.
- Genres: Death metal; progressive metal; thrash metal; heavy metal
- Occupation: Musician
- Instrument: Guitar
- Years active: 1983–2018; 2022–present
- Member of: Exhorder
- Formerly of: Cannibal Corpse; Nevermore; Chastain; Prizoner; Ceremony

Pat O'Brien (born May 17, 1965) is an American musician best known as the former lead guitarist for death metal band Cannibal Corpse. He is also a former member of heavy metal band Nevermore, a former live guitarist for Slayer, and is currently the lead guitarist for Exhorder.

== Biography ==
O'Brien was born in Northern Kentucky. He graduated from Conner High School in Hebron, Kentucky, in 1983 and currently resides in Tampa, Florida. His hobbies involve music and hunting.

O'Brien got his first guitar when he was 11. His mother bought him an acoustic guitar for Christmas. Later, when he started to practice more he received his first electric guitar, a Gibson SG copy (due to his adoration of AC/DC guitarist Angus Young). His father also bought him a 1974 Gibson Flying V. His influences include AC/DC, Black Sabbath, Deep Purple, Mercyful Fate and Metallica.

As a guitarist, O'Brien is formally trained, having studied classical guitar. He gave lessons at Buddy Rogers Music, a music store in Florence, Kentucky, and Maschinots Music in Southgate, KY, where he encouraged his students to listen to jazz, classical, fusion, country and blues and not focus solely on metal. He recalls that his interest in classical guitar probably came from a concert of Andrés Segovia he attended with his father. Segovia remains O'Brien's favourite guitarist and his main inspiration.

== Musical career ==
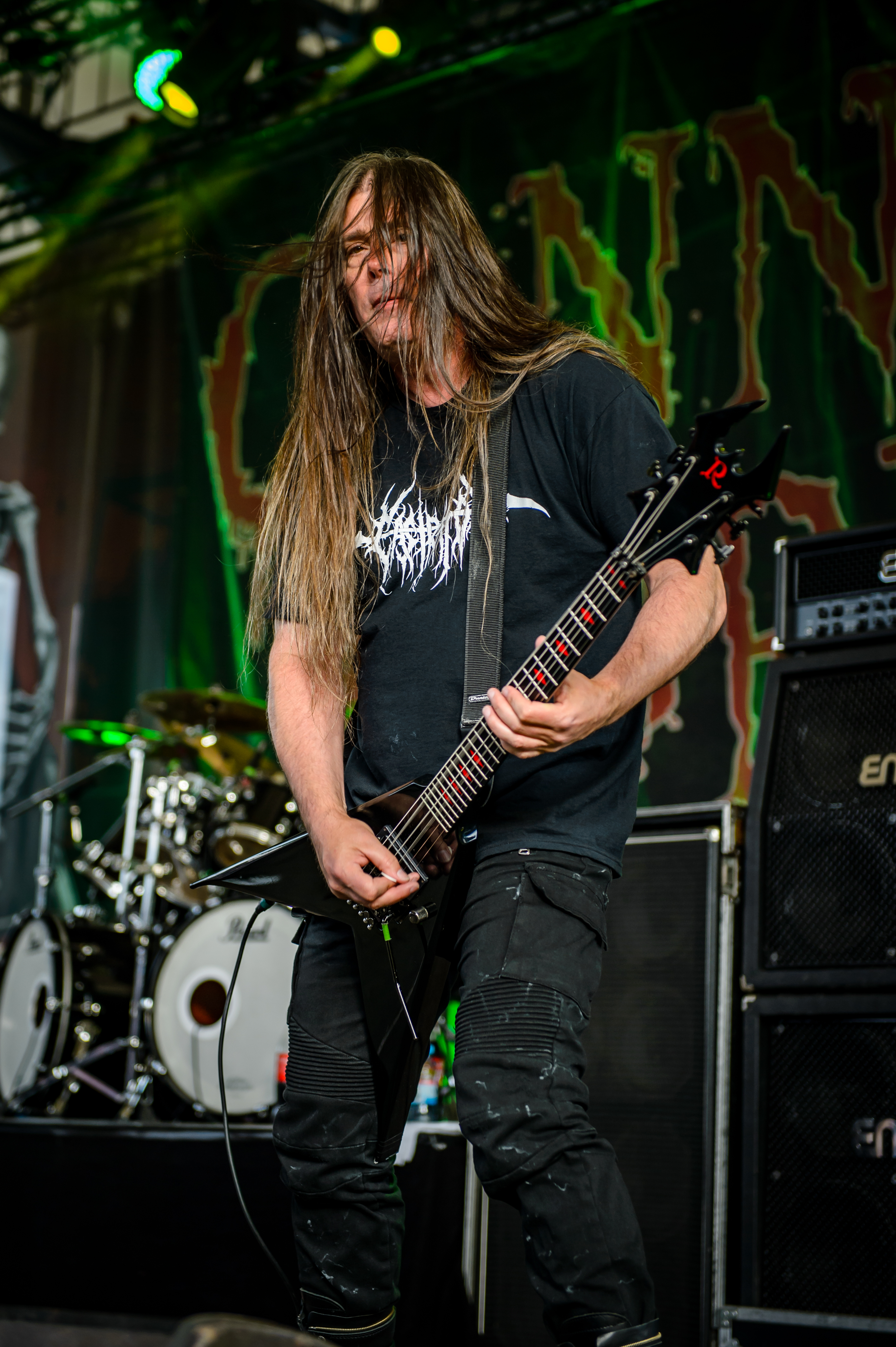
O'Brien performing at RockHard Festival in 2016

O'Brien started playing in a series of bands, sometimes as a touring musician and sometimes as a full-time member. Throughout the 1980s he played in heavy metal bands such as Chastain and Prizoner. In the 1990s O'Brien evolved from heavy metal to death metal. Between 1990 and 1992 he played in the Cincinnati-based death/thrash metal band Ceremony alongside Steve Tucker, Greg Reed and Shannon Purdon. They released a demo in 1992 entitled Ceremony, and an EP called The Days before the Death that did not come out before 2000 and for which O'Brien did the mastering with Mark Prator. After the band's breakup, O'Brien decided to move out of Cincinnati. He relocated to Los Angeles and searched for a new band. Through tape trading he eventually got hired by Nevermore, who at the time were looking for a second guitarist.

O'Brien stayed in the band for two years during which they recorded the EP In Memory and the full-length The Politics of Ecstasy which both came out in 1996. He also toured with the band and took part in a video shoot for the song "What Tomorrow Knows" from Nevermore's eponymous debut album. However, he felt unsatisfied with the band, preferring to be involved in death metal. Following his departure from Nevermore, O'Brien went through a transitional period where he briefly joined Monstrosity as a touring member but remained somewhat inactive for the rest of the time. When asked about Nevermore years later he replied "I got kicked out of Nevermore because I wasn’t queer."

=== Cannibal Corpse ===
In 1997 O'Brien was approached by Cannibal Corpse through several relations. After auditioning for the band, O'Brien ultimately became a permanent member replacing Rob Barrett. He has been featured on every Cannibal Corpse album since Gallery of Suicide up until Red Before Black when he officially parted ways with the band.

=== Slayer ===
In April 2011 O'Brien filled in for Exodus' Gary Holt when Holt left the Slayer European tour to play with his own band. Holt himself had been filling in for the now deceased Slayer guitarist Jeff Hanneman since February 26, 2011, subsequently joining the band. O'Brien recalled,

I had a week and a half to learn all the songs before going to play them live. I didn’t get very much notice when I got the final word to say OK, they want me to do it. Y'know, like "holy shit, OK". It was basically non-stop learning and playing guitar, working through the parts with Gary Holt, came in, they had a week of shows. I was staying on the side of the stage watching them play. All the guys in the band were really really cool. It was a great experience, it’s all I can say, it was awesome. They’re one of my favourite bands and what an awesome band to say you played for, I’m very proud to say I’ve done that. Being given the opportunity, it was amazing.

=== Exhorder ===
O'Brien joined Exhorder in 2022. Kyle Thomas said,

Having not been onstage for a while, he wondered, "Are these people going to want me around?'" We were, like, 'Come on, Pat. You're Pat O'Brien. These people want to see you.' I can appreciate how he felt about it after all he had been through. I could imagine there was an intimidation factor about it. We got up there and he said, 'I think I'm going to lay low in the back, get up and play and be done.' As soon as we got onstage and people saw him, the place went nuts. I said to the crowd, 'Hey, look, you all know Pat, right? Show Pat some love.' And they went nuts. They adore this man. Who wouldn't? If you ever met him, he's one of the nicest people you'd ever meet. He's one of the greatest at what he does, too. Then he started taking pictures with people and talking [after the gig]. He had a big smile on his face. That was so worth it. Here was a guy who needed a good break in his life and we needed help from him to get the show done. It couldn't have been any more perfect.

=== Guest appearances ===
O'Brien made several guest appearances as lead guitarist. He collaborated on Leather's solo debut album Shock Waves which came out in 1989. He played lead on the track "Balancing Act" which came out as a bonus track for the 1997 re-issue of Lethal's "Your Favorite God" EP. In 2006 he played lead guitar on "Render My Prey" on Spawn of Possession's album Noctambulant. In 2008 O'Brien played guitar on the song "Race Against Disaster" on Jeff Loomis's debut solo album Zero Order Phase. In the same year he made a guest solo appearance on Kataklysm's album Prevail.

== Artistry ==
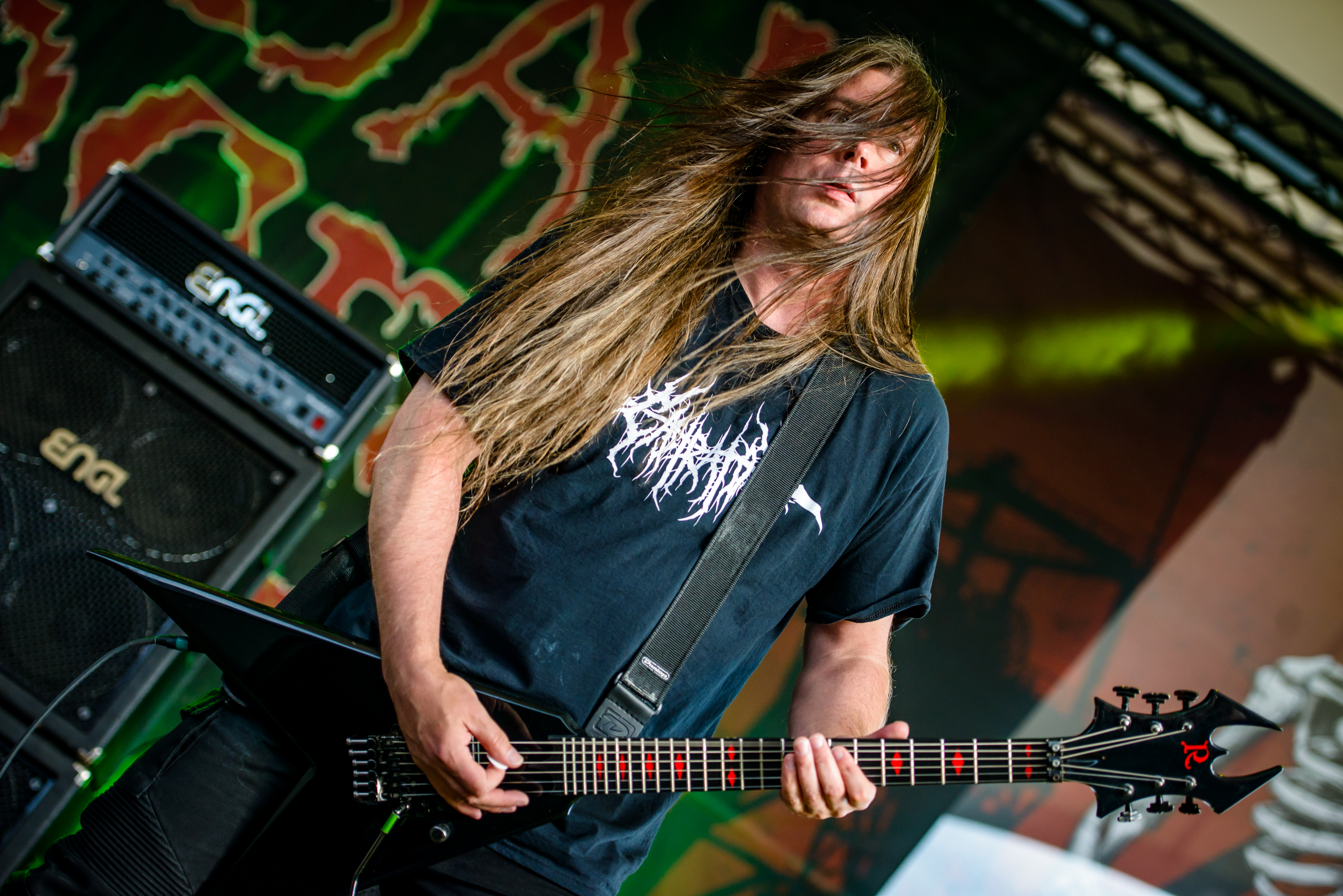
RockHard Festival 2016

Since his involvement in Cannibal Corpse, O'Brien has been credited on some of the band's more technically complicated songs. He said, "I just try to write stuff that’s challenging for me to play, that I think sounds cool." One song which has been cited by other band members, both past and current, as the most difficult Cannibal Corpse song is "Frantic Disembowelment" from the album The Wretched Spawn. As of 2025, the band has performed this song live only once. O'Brien has often been complimented by his co-members and other musicians in the death metal scene for his proficiency. In the documentary DVD Centuries of Torment: The First 20 Years bassist Alex Webster stated that "Some of his rhythm parts are as difficult as a solo might be in another band." Drummer Paul Mazurkiewicz commended his contribution to the band's music, stating "He really is a vital part of the Cannibal [Corpse] sound. His songs are awesome and we definitely need his songs on our CDs."

According to Cannibal Corpse vocalist George Fisher, "[O'Brien] definitely brings a more technical side, as far as playing goes. He usually writes the crazier songs and the more technical-sounding songs and probably technically hard-to-play songs. [...] I know, usually, vocal-wise, they definitely are [the most challenging to perform]. [...] His songs are usually fast, but when he slows down, it's pretty much heavier than fuck, heavier than anything you're going to hear." O'Brien himself admitted that he tends to write more technical songs but often regards it as a by-product of the songwriting process rather than an aim in itself. However, unlike Webster and Mazurkiewicz, O'Brien did not take part in the composition of lyrics.

O'Brien typically plays Flying V-shape guitars manufactured by B.C. Rich. He is quoted saying “Flying V's are about as metal as you can get for a guitar.” During his time in Cannibal Corpse, he used EMG-81 pickups with a Boss Metal Zone pedal through a Mesa/Boogie Triple Rectifier with Rectifier cabinets.

== Equipment ==
O'Brien plays mostly Jackson Custom Shop V's (as of 2017) which are equipped with a Fishman Fluence Modern pickup in the bridge position and a Floyd Rose bridge. When on tour, he takes four guitars, one for the different tunings and a spare. In Cannibal Corpse O'Brien used two tunings: A# standard and G# standard. Both companies have released their respective Pat O'Brien signature model. Throughout his career O'Brien has always preferred to use V-shaped guitars. Other guitars included in his collection are:

- B.C. Rich JR V (damaged during the house fire but was restored)
- B.C. Rich King V (damaged during the house fire but was restored)
- RAN Invader. (green camo one got destroyed)

(Older Guitars Used)

- B.C. Rich JR V 7 string, (destroyed)
- B.C. Rich JR V baritone, (destroyed)
- Gibson Flying V (1974, 1979 and 1981), (destroyed)
- Jackson Randy Rhoads, (destroyed)
- Jackson Custom Shop Double Rhoads V (destroyed)
- Jackson Custom Shop King V (destroyed)

For amplification O'Brien uses Mesa Boogie Triple Rectifier (2 channel) amplifier heads with 4x12 cabinets, some of which are loaded with Celestion Vintage 30 speakers and others which are loaded with Electro-Voice EVM12L Black Label Zakk Wylde speakers. He also uses a number of effect pedals such as a Robert Keeley modified Boss MT-2 Metal Zone, ISP Technologies Decimator Noise Reduction, Dunlop Cry Baby wah and a Boss Octaver.

== Arrest ==
On December 10, 2018, O'Brien was arrested in Tampa for burglary of a house in the 4700 block of Windflower Circle, as well as for assault on a responding deputy. Reports showed that around 6:57 p.m., he entered a home without permission from its two unidentified occupants. After one occupant told him to leave, O'Brien pushed a woman to the ground, left the house and hid in the property's backyard until police arrived. When a responding deputy gave him orders, O'Brien charged at them with a knife and the deputy tased him. He was booked into the Hillsborough County Sheriff's Office on charges of burglary with assault or battery and aggravated assault on a law enforcement officer, held without bail. The burglarized home was in the same area as a house which O'Brien was renting, which caught fire around the same time. It was not immediately clear if the fire was connected to his arrest. The owner of the burglarized home suspected that O'Brien may have been hallucinating, as he had spoken about the rapture and claimed someone was after him.

At O'Brien's court appearance on the morning of December 11, he wore an anti-suicide vest with his wrists and ankles chained together. His bail was set at $50,000 and he was told by a judge that he would need to pass a drug test to be bonded out of jail. O'Brien was released from jail on December 14, 2018, after posting bond.

The day after the fire subsided, fire marshals found a cache of weapons, locked safes, and potential explosive devices in O'Brien's possession. The list of weapons found included 50 shotguns, ten semi-automatic rifles (including several variants of AKMs), "two Uzi-style rifles and 20 handguns." Other materials found were two flamethrowers, thousands of rounds of ammunition, several other weapons with their parts, three skulls, and a sawed-off shotgun. The search warrant that was issued did not state if O'Brien had paperwork for his cache.

On March 16, 2021, O'Brien was sentenced to 150 hours of community service, $23,793.45 restitution, a 5-year probation with alcohol and drug evaluation and treatment, and time served.

=== Reactions ===
Cannibal Corpse expressed their respects for O'Brien and stated that he "is getting the help he needs and appreciates the love and support from Cannibal Corpse fans around the world," but would not release any further information regarding the incident. They then said that O'Brien is looking forward to a future return to the band and that their tours and shows would continue as planned. In 2021, Erik Rutan from Hate Eternal officially became the new guitar player for Cannibal Corpse.

Cannibal Corpse vocalist George "Corpsegrinder" Fisher said that he was shocked to hear about O'Brien's arrest and that both the band and the fans have expressed their support for him. He also said that he broke down upon seeing him in court wearing the anti-suicide vest. A crowdfunding campaign for O'Brien was launched by drummer Paul Mazurkiewicz's then-wife Deana. She stated that he "does not have insurance, and lost everything that he owns. These funds will help him get back on his feet with the regular much-needed necessities like clothing, a roof over his head, and other daily life necessities that are needed."

== Discography ==
Ceremony

- 1991 – untitled/unreleased (Demo)
- 1992 – Ceremony (Demo)
- 2000 – The Days Before the Death (EP)

with Nevermore

- 1996 – In Memory (EP)
- 1996 – The Politics of Ecstasy

with Cannibal Corpse

- 1998 – Gallery of Suicide
- 1999 – Bloodthirst
- 2002 – Gore Obsessed
- 2004 – The Wretched Spawn
- 2006 – Kill
- 2009 – Evisceration Plague
- 2012 – Torture
- 2014 – A Skeletal Domain
- 2017 – Red Before Black

with Exhorder

- 2024 – Defectum Omnium

=== Guest session ===
Jeff Loomis

- 2008 – Zero Order Phase

Kataklysm

- 2008 – Prevail

Leather

- 1989 – Shock Waves

Lethal

- 1997 – Your Favorite God (EP)

Spawn of Possession

- 2006 – Noctambulant

Intimidation

- 2016 – "Throne of Influence" (Spiritual Thrashing EP)
