= Nevermore =

American heavy metal band

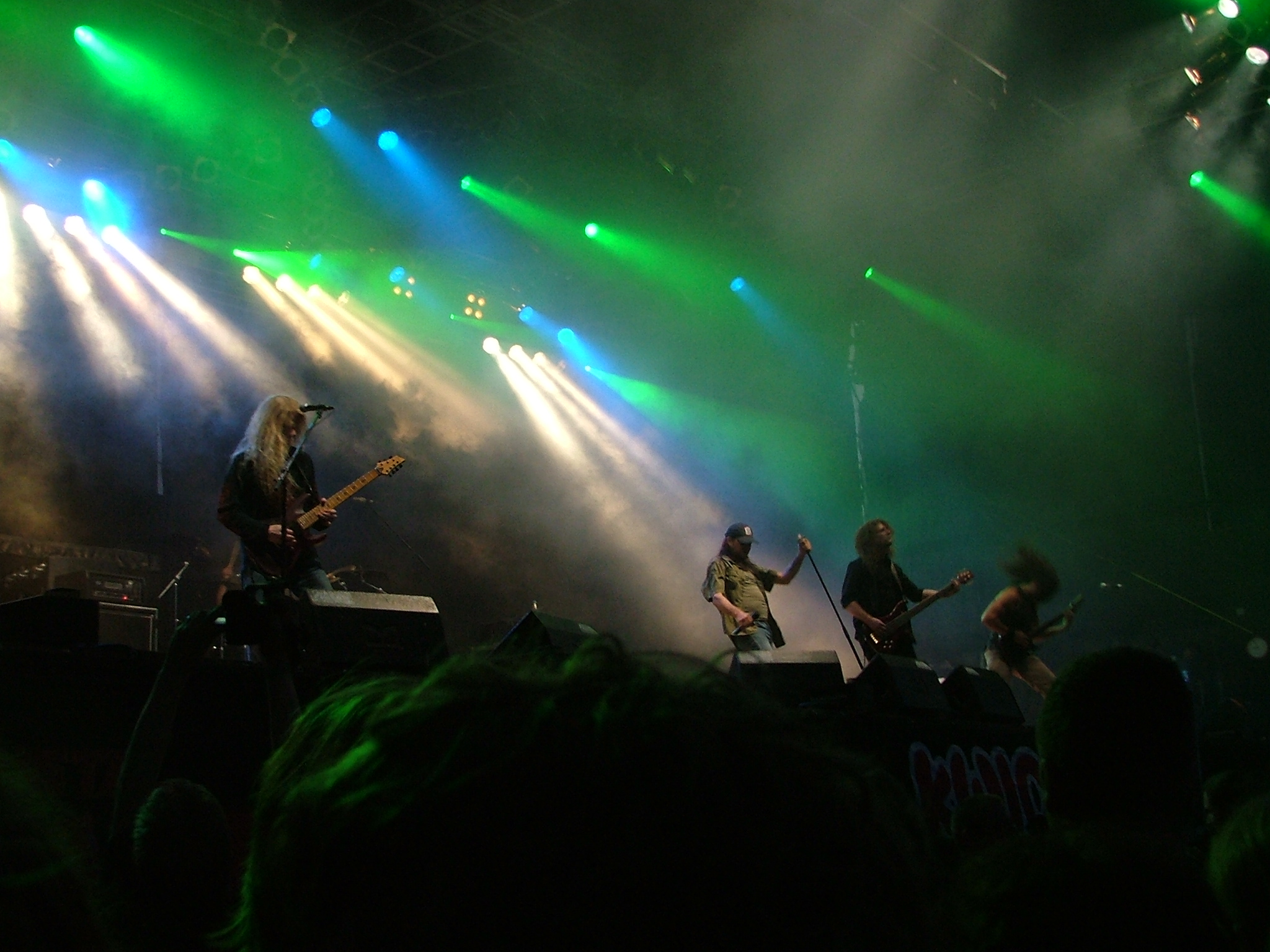
- Nevermore in 2007. L-R: Jeff Loomis, Warrel Dane, Tim Johnston, and Chris Broderick.

Background information
- Origin: Seattle, Washington, U.S.
- Genres: Progressive metal; thrash metal; power metal; heavy metal
- Works: Discography
- Years active: 1992–2011; 2024–present
- Labels: Reigning Phoenix; Century Media
- Members: Jeff Loomis; Van Williams; Berzan Önen; Jack Cattoi; Semir Özerkan
- Past members: Warrel Dane; Jim Sheppard; Mark Arrington; Pat O'Brien; Tim Calvert; Adam Gardner; Steve Smyth; Chris Broderick; Attila Vörös
- Website: www.nevermoreofficial.com

Nevermore is an American heavy metal band formed in Seattle, Washington, in 1992. The band emerged following the dissolution of Sanctuary, whose final line-up included vocalist Warrel Dane, bassist Jim Sheppard and guitarist Jeff Loomis. The three musicians formed Nevermore with drummer Mark Arrington, who was replaced by Van Williams in 1994. Nevermore's music incorporates elements of progressive metal, thrash metal and power metal.

Nevermore released seven studio albums between 1995 and 2010. Following their self-titled début (1995), the band expanded to a five-piece with guitarist Pat O'Brien, who performed on The Politics of Ecstasy (1996). He was succeeded by Tim Calvert, who contributed to Dreaming Neon Black (1999). After Calvert's departure, Nevermore recorded Dead Heart in a Dead World (2000) and Enemies of Reality (2003) as a quartet. Guitarist Steve Smyth joined for This Godless Endeavor (2005), but left in 2007 following health problems and disagreements within the band.

After an extended break and the release of solo albums by Dane and Loomis, Nevermore returned with The Obsidian Conspiracy (2010), their seventh studio album. In April 2011, Loomis and Williams announced their departure, citing internal difficulties. Although Dane maintained that Nevermore had not disbanded and expressed intentions to continue with replacement musicians, the group became inactive, while he and Sheppard concentrated on the reunited Sanctuary. Dane died in December 2017.

In December 2024, Loomis and Williams announced plans to revive Nevermore with a new line-up. In February 2026, the band introduced vocalist Berzan Önen, guitarist Jack Cattoi and bassist Semir Özerkan, and announced a recording agreement with Reigning Phoenix Music. The reformed group made its live début in Istanbul on 1 April 2026.

== History ==
=== Sanctuary ===
Nevermore emerged from the dissolution of Seattle heavy metal band Sanctuary, in which vocalist Warrel Dane and bassist Jim Sheppard had performed since the mid-1980s. Following the release of Into the Mirror Black (1990), Sanctuary began work on a third album, but internal disagreements and pressure to adapt to the changing Seattle music scene contributed to the band's breakup before it could be completed. Dane and Sheppard subsequently began working on new material with guitarist Jeff Loomis, eventually forming Nevermore.

Dane, Loomis and Sheppard wanted to keep the name Sanctuary, but they had to change it for legal reasons. The name "Nevermore" came from a line in Trouble's "Black Shapes of Doom".

=== Early years and début album (1992–1994) ===
During the early days of Nevermore, Dane and Sheppard were working at an Italian restaurant in Seattle, and they shared a small house on Queen Anne's Avenue not too far from it. Jeff Loomis soon relocated from Appleton, Wisconsin, and joined them. While Sheppard worked long shifts at the restaurant, Dane and Loomis spent most of their time writing music.

The first drummer for Nevermore, Mark Arrington, was not recruited through an audition. He was playing in a Seattle band called Bone Towne, alongside singer Freddy Krumins, bassist Tim Johnston and guitarist Tracy Moody. Moody was living with Warrel Dane, Jim Sheppard and Jeff Loomis at the Queen Anne house at the time. Bone Towne played a local club gig attended by Dane, Sheppard and Loomis. They liked Arrington and afterwards, back at the shared house, Dane and Sheppard asked Moody whether they could "use" Arrington to finish the records they were working on, which would result in the Utopia demo. Arrington agreed and shortly afterwards recorded with them at Robert Lang Studios. He says most of the music had already been written and arranged before he became involved. Arrington also said that their subsequent show at the Rock Candy was the first gig under the name Nevermore. Former Sanctuary members/fans were apparently present, making the début somewhat tense.

Arrington says he left Nevermore to pursue another project in Tucson, Arizona. In retrospect he attributed it partly to being a cocky 22-year-old musician who wanted to pursue his own ambitions, whereas Dane demanded total commitment to Nevermore. After Arrington left, Nevermore held auditions for a permanent drummer and selected Van Williams, from New York. Williams had moved from the Hudson Valley to Seattle in 1993 and joined the band in 1994 after auditioning.

Because the Sanctuary musicians remained contractually tied to Epic, Dane and Sheppard had a meeting with their A&R representative after the representative heard the first Nevermore demos. The A&R man's opening comment was that he expected something "more grunge". After multiple refusals, Dane issued an ultimatum to Epic, and said that Nevermore would not change their musical style and either Epic accepted it or they would move to a different record company. They then parted ways with Epic and obtained a Century Media deal. Originally Nevermore wanted to re-record the songs from the demos, but the Century Media representative argued that the quality of the recordings was sufficiently strong and only required remixing for release. This resulted in their two demos becoming the first album split into two sets: the first set of involved Mark Arrington and the second set involved Van Williams.

Nevermore was released on 11 February 1995.

=== In Memory and The Politics of Ecstasy (1995–1996) ===
Nevermore in 1996 with Pat O'Brien

Nevermore's self-titled début album received much attention and specialized review, as its release was followed by a European tour with Blind Guardian and a North American tour with Death.

Second guitarist Pat O'Brien joined the band prior to the recording of the EP In Memory and also took part in the recording of the subsequent album The Politics of Ecstasy, both from 1996.

Politics was recorded at Village Productions in Tornillo, Texas, with Neil Kernon producing, recording and mixing.

The Politics of Ecstasy was substantially the product of Nevermore functioning as an established band. Dane said that by the time they were writing it, they also had leftover earlier material that stylistically no longer fitted; those songs instead became the In Memory EP.

Century Media describes the five In Memory EP tracks as having been recorded during the same sessions as Politics. But some of the material was much older. "Matricide" and "The Sorrowed Man" pre-date Nevermore itself. Earlier versions existed in the Sanctuary period: "Matricide" as "Mother Earth" and "The Sorrowed Man" as "Forever" on a 1990 Sanctuary demo. Both subsequently appeared, under their eventual titles, on the 1992 Utopia demo, from the embryonic project that became Nevermore.

Looking back in 2000, Dane called Politics a controversial album because its songs were deliberately complicated and had surprised listeners accustomed to the début. He joked that beside Politics, In Memory sounded almost commercial. A contemporary November 1996 review specifically praised its unusually tight and intricate guitar/bass arrangements, vocal layering and studio experimentation, and noted that Kernon had a full recording budget available.

Dane described Nevermore as having had to survive the period in which metal was completely out of fashion. He contrasted that with the revival he was seeing by 2005. So Nevermore responded to the commercial environment not by simplifying their music but by making an album that was even more uncompromisingly complicated.

There are recurring Timothy Leary references in this album, which can attract criticism that it looks like a Timothy Leary concept album. When asked whether Politics was a concept album, Dane's answer was effectively no: it is based broadly on human emotions and observations. He said that for him lyrics arise from ordinary things he encountered, something he might hear on television, for example, which he then developed into a subject. Dane was fascinated by Timothy Leary's writings. The title comes directly from Leary's 1968 book The Politics of Ecstasy. Even more significantly, "The Seven Tongues of God" is also the title of the book's first chapter. Dane later explained this explicitly. "The Seven Tongues of God" relates to Leary's ideas concerning levels of energy/consciousness, while the album/title song's interest in drugs concerns, for Dane, the larger question of whether governments should control what an individual chooses to do with his own body and mind. He stressed that this was not advocacy of drug use and said he himself wasn't taking drugs when he wrote the material.

Many of the subjects seem to revolve around individual consciousness confronted by systems that seek to define or control it: religion, government, drugs, social conformity, political power, even the solitary Tiananmen protester.

Pat O'Brien left Nevermore to play in Cannibal Corpse and Curran Murphy from Shatter Messiah was enlisted as a touring guitarist for the band until Tim Calvert (who played for the band Forbidden) was able to join the band.

Three years without releases followed, but in 1999, Nevermore's third album Dreaming Neon Black was released. The tracks of this album are varied in style, ranging from slow and melodic to aggressive and progressive.

=== Dreaming Neon Black (1999) ===
As Pat O'Brien joined Cannibal Corpse in 1997 and Tim Calvert, formerly of Forbidden, joined Nevermore, the band's official history credits Calvert's melodic and technical contribution as important to Dreaming Neon Black's distinctive sound; Loomis similarly recalled Calvert contributing a lot of good things and specifically credited him as the composer of "All Play Dead." Loomis described the Dreaming Neon Black period as one of spontaneous riff-writing, with much of the album composed that way.

While the band was writing the album, Warrel Dane unexpectedly began having recurring dreams about a former girlfriend. Once he had developed a storyline from this, he proposed a concept album to the rest of the band, who were strongly against the idea, so he stopped telling them what he was doing and privately developed the story while the others continued writing songs, fitting his lyrics around the music afterward. He deliberately left gaps in the narrative, anticipating the band would later debate song order, and filled in those gaps once the running order was set. He regarded it as a successful experiment testing whether the band could write music that fit a coherent narrative without knowing what it was. He also said the story was kept purposefully vague so listeners could draw their own meanings from it, and because more was happening in it than he intended to explain in interviews.

Dreaming Neon Black follows a man whose lover disappears after joining a religious group. Unable to learn her fate, he's consumed by grief, recurring dreams, and the hope of being reunited with her; his longing turns into anger at God, distrust of the world, and self-blame as his sanity deteriorates, with dreams offering both comfort and captivity as he's drawn toward a tragic reunion. The album explores love, loss, and the destructive power of grief without resolution. Dane's real relationship provided the emotional and autobiographical catalyst, but he didn't simply recount what he believed had happened to his girlfriend; he invented a protagonist who loses his lover and psychologically collapses, describing the ending as "Shakespearean" in that everyone dies.

The album was recorded at Village Productions in Tornillo, Texas, where Nevermore had also recorded In Memory and The Politics of Ecstasy, again with producer Neil Kernon, and was released on 11 January 1999 per Century Media. Kernon later noted it was recorded on analogue equipment, before high-quality multitrack Pro Tools became part of his workflow, contrasting it with Andy Sneap's subsequent production of Dead Heart in a Dead World. Dane later said the band was nervous about moving away from Kernon, their established producer, which is why they deliberately returned to the same Texas studio for Dead Heart even after changing producers.

Christine Rhoades (also known as Christine Rinehart), an old friend of Dane's whose voice he loved, supplied the female vocals the concept required; she had previously sung in another Seattle band and had already contributed vocals to "Garden of Gray" on Nevermore's début album. Dane said he enjoyed pushing her to sing more intensely than she was used to, since that in her own band she didn't use her full vocal range. According to Calvert, however, Rhoades wasn't actually present for the album sessions; Dane had earlier recorded her, apparently while she was drunk, onto a four-track recorder in Seattle. Her recorded melodies were in a different key and tempo from the finished song, and Kernon manipulated the recording to fit it in.

Travis Smith handled the album's artwork and design; Loomis said Nevermore's artwork resulted from close collaboration between Smith and Dane on visual concepts, with Dreaming Neon Black among the earlier records Smith created for the band.

A long tour followed with Nevermore sharing stages with bands such as Mercyful Fate, Arch Enemy, Iced Earth, and Opeth.

=== Dead Heart in a Dead World (1999–2001) ===
Nevermore began writing the follow-up to Dreaming Neon Black while still on the tour for that album, which lasted almost continuously for about a year and ended around late March 2000. In a September 2000 interview, Warrel Dane said the band then finished the remaining songs and entered the studio, and that every song they wrote ended up on the album, something he believed had never happened to them before.

Dead Heart in a Dead World was the first album made after the departure of guitarist Tim Calvert soon after the end of the tour. At the time, Dane said Calvert had left because marriage and the demands of touring had become incompatible, insisting that he had not been fired and that they remained friends. In a 2001 interview, Calvert disputed this account and described problems involving management and the band's behaviour, including drunken performances.

Dane said that Calvert's departure allowed him and Jeff Loomis to concentrate more closely on songwriting, and that the band had become more focused as a result. Loomis later said Dead Heart was when Nevermore "really started to change as a band to become better songwriters."

By 2003, Loomis said that working as a four-piece was easier both in the studio and "business-wise": he could make the guitars sufficiently tight himself on record, while a second guitarist could be hired for touring. Curran Murphy once again became the live guitarist; Dane said in 2000 that he was an obvious choice, as he was already a friend of the band, knew most of their material and had toured with them during the Politics of Ecstasy period.

Nevermore wanted a different sound for the album, and after discussing options with their previous producer Neil Kernon, they decided that a new producer would bring "fresh blood." They chose Andy Sneap, partly because he was also a guitarist. Dane later admitted that changing producers made the band nervous, so they kept one familiar element by recording again at Village Productions in Tornillo, Texas.

Dead Heart in a Dead World was also Nevermore's first album to feature seven-string guitars. Loomis later described it as a turning point at which the band deliberately sought an entirely new sound and began discovering how to make their musical chemistry work, and said that the touring that followed lasted roughly three or four years and made Nevermore a solid live band. In 2026 he still described it as the point where they "found themselves musically and compositionally."

Dead Heart's recording was followed by tours with several bands, most notably with In Flames and Shadows Fall in late 2000 and Savatage in 2001. Nevermore hired session guitarists for live appearances, such as Curran Murphy (who went on to play in Annihilator) and Chris Broderick of Jag Panzer and Megadeth.

=== Enemies of Reality and dispute with Century Media (2001–2005) ===
The band's fifth album, Enemies of Reality, remained in production for over a year during a dispute with Century Media over the renewal of the band's contract. This album faced much criticism for its production. Dane later explained that the label had wanted an early renewal, while the band preferred to fulfil its existing obligations and negotiate afterwards because since every record sold more than the previous one up until that point, if the last record was a success they could use it as leverage. According to Dane, the label then held the band to the smaller budget specified in the existing agreement. Jim Sheppard said in 2003 that the recording budget had been cut by two-thirds, and that Nuclear Blast and SPV were possible alternatives to Century Media. He also alleged that the label had become increasingly controlling and that the band's financial terms had not improved despite rising album sales.

Andy Sneap, who had produced Dead Heart in a Dead World, was too busy to take part, so the band recruited Kelly Gray. Gray had a studio at home in Seattle, which is where the band recorded it. Fans would later criticise the sound resulting from the mixing. In 2003, Loomis and Sheppard defended the album's sound, but by 2005 Loomis and Dane were strongly critical of the finished production. Dane said the band had been happy with the rough mixes but not with the final result.

By March 2004, Nevermore had officially renewed its contract with Century Media; Dane said both sides had worked to resolve their differences and that the band had considered offers from other labels. In 2005 he said the new contract had been structured to prevent a repeat of the Enemies of Reality situation, and that the band's financial situation had improved enough for the members to live from their music. Century Media proposed a remix by Sneap, and a remixed edition replaced the original release in 2005.

Musically, Enemies of Reality was shorter and more direct than its predecessor. Loomis said the band wanted to avoid another hour-long album, and it runs to nine tracks. Sheppard described it as sitting between The Politics of Ecstasy and Dead Heart in a Dead World, pairing the former's technical riffing with the latter's memorable vocal melodies. Exclaim! described Loomis's guitars as tuned down to B-flat, with a more aggressive, death-metal-influenced approach, and noted a return to the political and social themes of The Politics of Ecstasy. Sheppard said the September 11 attacks, which occurred while the band was touring, substantially influenced the songs written afterwards.

On tour, the band was joined by second lead guitarist Steve Smyth, formerly of Vicious Rumors and Testament; Smyth was eventually added to the line-up on a permanent basis.

=== This Godless Endeavor (2005–2007) ===
Nevermore, performing at Curitiba Master Hall, Curitiba, Brazil, in 2006

A sixth album, This Godless Endeavor, was released in July 2005. For this album, Nevermore added Steve Smyth as a permanent second guitarist. Jeff Loomis had been the only studio guitarist on the two previous albums. Loomis said he and Smyth had known each other for years, and that Smyth's demos were stylistically closer to Nevermore than those of Chris Broderick, who had previously filled in live. He felt their shared guitar influences helped them complement one another. Loomis said Smyth's involvement returned the band to something resembling the collaborative songwriting of The Politics of Ecstasy, rather than most of the material originating with himself.

Loomis said that Nevermore had been satisfied with the songs on Enemies of Reality but deeply unhappy with how the finished recording sounded, and that for the new album the band wanted to restore confidence in its work. With the Century Media contract renewed and Andy Sneap available again as producer, the band could concentrate on recording in a more suitable environment.

Nevermore recorded the album at Sneap's rural studio in Derbyshire, England, which Loomis said was their first album recorded outside the United States. Loomis estimated about two months in the studio, with roughly six weeks of actual recording. Dane said that concerts and promotional commitments, including a show in Greece, had been scheduled on the assumption that the album would be finished, so the sessions had to be interrupted when recording overran, which pushed completion about a month behind schedule.

Dane said it was the first album he had recorded sober. He admitted he had been frightened by the prospect because alcohol had previously been a psychological crutch during recording, and he credited Sneap's guidance for much of the improvement in his vocal performances.

The band chose Hugh Syme rather than their usual artist Travis Smith for the cover, as they wanted a different visual direction.

In 2005, Nevermore joined Megadeth's inaugural Gigantour, which Loomis described as a chance to reach much larger American audiences than the band normally attracted. Because their set was only about 30 minutes long, the band planned rotating setlists, and the nearly nine-minute title track was impractical for that format.

Nevermore then toured during the summer of 2005. In 2006, they toured with Disturbed and also as direct support to In Flames on the second leg of its North American tour.

=== Health problems and lineup changes (2004–2007) ===
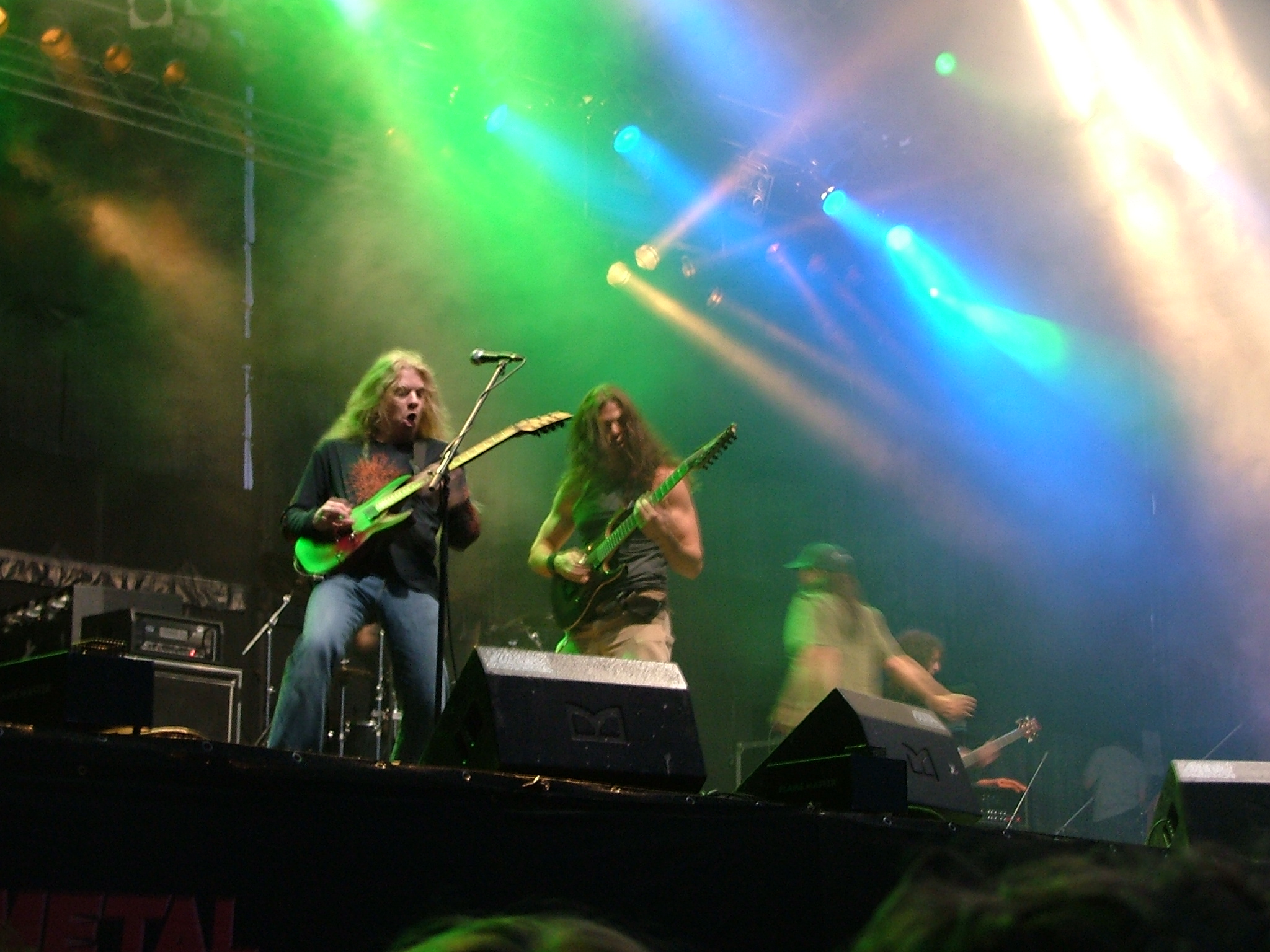
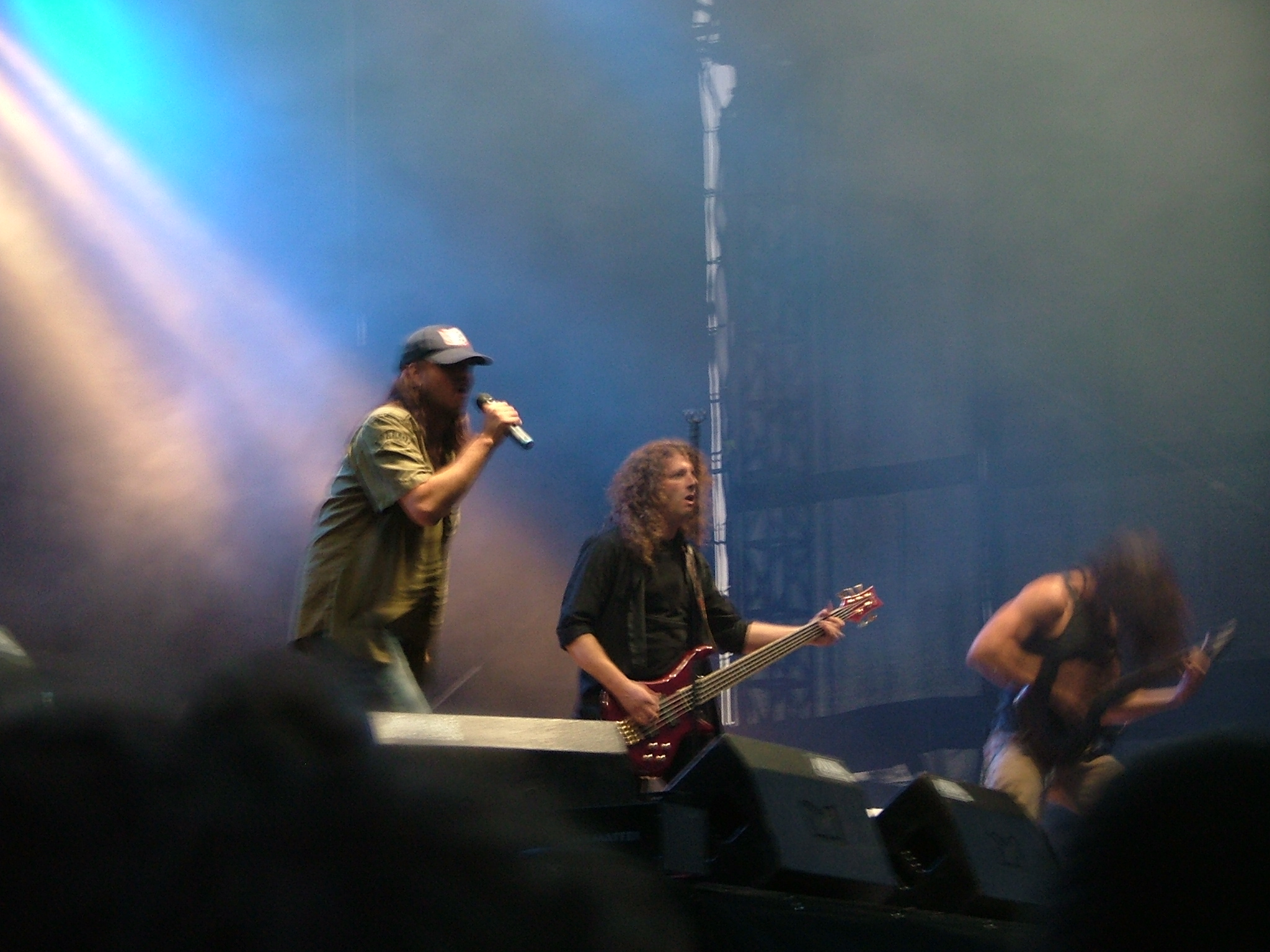
Nevermore at Summerbreeze Festival 2007

Around 2004, Warrel Dane suffered a severe pancreatic illness while heavily drinking and having undiagnosed type 2 diabetes. In a July 2005 interview, he said he was hospitalised and lost awareness of about two weeks of his stay. Afterwards he stopped drinking, lost weight, began exercising and took medication for diabetes, and he described This Godless Endeavor as the first Nevermore album he had recorded sober.

In October 2005, Steve Smyth injured his knee during a performance in Athens and underwent arthroscopic surgery in London. Blood tests during his hospital stay showed abnormal kidney function, which he later described as the first sign of a serious underlying condition. He continued touring, including the North American dates with Opeth, until further tests established its severity.

In April 2006, the band announced that Jim Sheppard would undergo a procedure related to Crohn's disease, which he had managed for over fifteen years. Former Megadeth and Iced Earth bassist James MacDonough filled in for the opening dates of the North American tour supporting In Flames.

On 1 May 2006, Smyth announced that he had been born with only one kidney, which had a congenital obstruction, and that he faced end-stage kidney failure and possible transplantation. He withdrew from the In Flames tour and was replaced by Chris Broderick of Jag Panzer. Sheppard returned to the tour in May, with the 20 May show in Chico, California reported as his first regular appearance since his absence. Smyth had hoped to rejoin for the June European festivals, but on 30 May he announced that his kidneys had failed sooner than expected and that he was receiving dialysis, so Broderick continued with the band.

In September 2006, the band planned to film their first full-length live DVD at the Zeche club in Bochum, Germany. On the day of the show, Dane became ill with what was reported as an infection and was kept under medical care at a hospital in Dortmund, so the concert and filming were cancelled. Management said the decision came late in the afternoon, after production preparations were already under way. The band returned to the venue on 11 October and recorded the concert that became the main performance on The Year of the Voyager, with Broderick as second guitarist.

Smyth later received a kidney transplant. On 30 August 2007, he announced that he had left Nevermore by mutual agreement, citing personal and business differences, and that doctors had cleared him to perform again. Smyth stated that he would also be touring with Danish metal band Hatesphere as they supported Behemoth and later Dimmu Borgir, and would also be working on the release of The Esseness Project, an all-instrumental progressive rock album. Broderick remained the band's touring guitarist.

=== The Year of the Voyager (2006–2008) ===
In 2008, Nevermore released the live DVD The Year of the Voyager. Its main performance was filmed at the Zeche club in Bochum, Germany, on 11 October 2006, after the planned recording on 12 September was cancelled because of Warrel Dane's illness. Chris Broderick played second guitar in place of Steve Smyth, and the set drew on songs from across the band's catalogue. A second disc contained footage from four other concerts, promotional videos and an interview with Dane.

Dane described the DVD in October 2008 as a record of the band's experiences over the preceding years, saying Nevermore had toured for more than a year and built up enough live experience to justify a substantial release. The DVD reached No. 82 on the German DVD chart, and in a statement after the chart entry the band confirmed they were working on new Nevermore material.

The release came about two years after the Bochum recording. In a February 2009 interview, the band said the delay was not due to legal difficulties but to dissatisfaction with the video editing, which caused them to miss the intended release date. In a 2010 interview, Loomis said the DVD had been repeatedly postponed because of health problems within the band.

=== First hiatus and solo projects ===
After the tour for This Godless Endeavor ended in 2007, Nevermore took an extended break. Loomis later said the band had come close to breaking up and needed time away from each other after so long on the road, describing the choice as a break or a split. During the hiatus, Dane released his first solo album, Praises to the War Machine (2008), produced by Peter Wichers, with a guest appearance by Loomis. Loomis released the instrumental album Zero Order Phase (2008) produced by Neil Kernon, and also gave guitar clinics and appeared on albums by other artists. He began writing new Nevermore material in early 2009, and the band hired Wichers to produce The Obsidian Conspiracy.

Later that year Chris Broderick departed to join Megadeth.

In an interview with Komodo Rock published in July, Jeff Loomis said that "I actually have six or seven songs already for the new Nevermore record. I'm about half way there, and we're going to be going into the studio probably some time in the early fall."

=== The Obsidian Conspiracy (2009–2010) ===
Nevermore were one of the first bands to be confirmed for Wacken Open Air 2009, where they performed alongside many bands including Motörhead, DragonForce, and HammerFall.

Nevermore recorded their seventh studio album, The Obsidian Conspiracy, in 2009. Peter Wichers, who had produced Warrel Dane's solo album, produced it, and Andy Sneap again handled the mixing. Drums were recorded in August 2009 at Robert Lang Studios in Seattle, and the remaining main sessions took place at a rented house on Lake Norman, North Carolina. Loomis played all the guitars on the album.

Loomis said the band could easily have made a second This Godless Endeavor but wanted to try something different. The new songs were shorter and more structured, with choruses arriving earlier and fewer extended instrumental passages. Loomis credited Wichers with substantially shaping the arrangements. He had initially presented compositions of seven or eight minutes, and Wichers encouraged him to shorten them and emphasise structure and choruses. Dane said the lyrics returned to subjects including capital punishment, abortion, murder and suicide, but that the album was not a concept record.

The recording was completed in October 2009 and was released in June 2010 in America, and May 2010 in the EU. It debuted at number 134 on the US Billboard 200, with approximately 4,000 copies sold in its first week, and reached number one on the Heatseekers chart. Dane described the Billboard entry as the band's highest to that point. Hungarian guitarist Attila Vörös, who had played in Dane's solo band, joined as Nevermore's live guitarist.

On June 1, 2010, Nevermore announced a North American tour in the fall with openers Warbringer, Hatesphere, and Blackguard.

=== Sanctuary reformation ===
During the recording of The Obsidian Conspiracy, Warrel Dane and Jim Sheppard became involved in the reformation of Sanctuary, their former band, alongside guitarist Lenny Rutledge. The reunion began taking shape in 2010, with Jeff Loomis also initially participating. Dane announced plans to record new Sanctuary material while Nevermore was touring in support of The Obsidian Conspiracy. According to Rutledge, the two bands were intended to remain active simultaneously, rather than Sanctuary replacing Nevermore. Both groups performed aboard the 70000 Tons of Metal cruise in January 2011. Loomis subsequently withdrew from Sanctuary around the time of his departure from Nevermore in April 2011.

=== Management and payment dispute ===
For a long time, Dane and bassist Jim Sheppard managed Nevermore themselves. In a 2001 interview, Sheppard said the band had been without a manager for a long time and had been seeking professional management, and that they had recently made contact with a manager at Continental Concerts.

In a 2011 interview after leaving the band, Loomis said that roughly five or six years earlier, members had been paid through Dane and Sheppard. He said he and drummer Van Williams approached the band's manager and lawyer to arrange direct, equal payments instead, and that the change upset both Dane and Sheppard, who Loomis said believed he was the band's manager.

=== Departure of Loomis and Williams (2011) ===
In February 2011, bassist Jim Sheppard underwent surgery to remove a benign brain tumour, and Dagna Barrera filled in for him during Nevermore's European tour with Symphony X. Loomis later said that he and drummer Van Williams proposed withdrawing from the band's upcoming North American dates so that Sheppard could recover and the members could regroup, and that Dane opposed the idea, leading to an escalating disagreement. Nevermore announced the cancellation of its North American dates on 11 April.

On 21 April 2011, Loomis and Williams announced their departure, citing internal struggles and continuing problems within the band. Dane said he learned of it through the media and expressed particular disappointment in Loomis. He also acknowledged that alcohol and organisational problems had contributed to the band's difficulties. Williams said Dane's comments confirmed that he had made the right decision in leaving.

In a September 2011 interview, Loomis attributed the split to accumulated exhaustion from touring and recording, alcohol, recurring health problems and disagreements over the band's finances.

On 3 May 2011, it was announced that Nevermore had cancelled its entire Australian tour. In July 2011, Dane said Nevermore had not broken up and that he planned to recruit replacements, with touring guitarist Attila Vörös expected to remain involved, but that his main focus was on Sanctuary. He also said it would be difficult to continue Nevermore without Loomis. Loomis said he was uncertain about returning to Nevermore.

=== Second hiatus and deaths (2011–2019) ===
Following the departures of Jeff Loomis and Van Williams, Nevermore remained inactive. Dane and Sheppard continued performing with the reunited Sanctuary, which released The Year the Sun Died in October 2014, while Loomis pursued his solo career and joined Arch Enemy later that year.

In April 2015, Dane said that Nevermore had not disbanded and that he had completed the lyrics for a proposed eighth album shortly after Loomis and Williams departed in 2011. He described the material as continuing the story-driven approach of earlier Nevermore lyrics and said that he and Sheppard would participate, although the remaining line-up was uncertain. He expressed interest in working with Loomis again but questioned his availability due to his commitments to Arch Enemy. In June, Dane revealed that he had retained several volumes of lyrics intended for Nevermore, although he remained uncertain whether the band would record again.

In March 2016, Dane said that the former members had not discussed a reunion, although they remained on good terms. In September, he expressed reservations about continuing without Loomis, whose commitments he believed would prevent his participation, and said that his solo album and Sanctuary took priority.

On 13 December 2017, Dane died of a heart attack in São Paulo, Brazil, aged 56, while recording his second solo album, Shadow Work. Guitarist Johnny Moraes, who was present when Dane became ill, attempted to resuscitate him before emergency services arrived.

On 30 April 2018, former guitarist Tim Calvert died aged 52 after suffering from amyotrophic lateral sclerosis (ALS). His illness had been kept private at his request. Loomis paid tribute to Calvert, recalling both his musical accomplishments and his subsequent career as an airline captain.

In 2018, Loomis said that he and Dane had at one point had some talks about a reunion and writing new songs, which did not come to fruition. In October 2019, he said that reviving Nevermore without Dane was "not feasible," explaining that the band's sound depended on the specific musicians who had played in it.

=== Reunion (2024–present) ===
Berzan Önen fronting Nevermore in 2026

On 27 December 2024, Jeff Loomis and Van Williams released a teaser indicating plans to revive Nevermore in 2025. The announcement drew criticism from Priscila Sheppard, wife of founding bassist Jim Sheppard, who stated that her husband had not been contacted about the reunion and described the use of the band's name without his involvement as disrespectful. On 1 January 2025, Loomis and Williams confirmed the reunion and announced an international search for a new vocalist and bassist, stating that Sheppard had retired from music.

In August 2025, Nevermore were announced for the 2026 editions of Wacken Open Air and Bloodstock Open Air, marking their planned return to live performances after fifteen years.

On 12 February 2026, the band announced a recording agreement with Reigning Phoenix Music and introduced their new line-up, consisting of vocalist Berzan Önen, guitarist Jack Cattoi and bassist Semir Özerkan, alongside Loomis and Williams. The reformed Nevermore performed their first concert on 1 April 2026 in Istanbul, Turkey.

In an August 2026 interview, Önen described Warrel Dane as a major influence on both his vocal style and lyric writing. He said that, although he had performed Nevermore songs for many years, he intended to bring his own interpretation to the material rather than imitate Dane. Loomis similarly stated that the band had sought a vocalist capable of performing the existing repertoire while maintaining an individual style, and confirmed that the new members would contribute to the songwriting for future material.

== Musical style ==
Nevermore's main sound is difficult to categorize, but they are generally described as progressive metal, thrash metal, and classic heavy metal.

== Band members ==
Current members

- Jeff Loomis – guitars, backing vocals (1992–2011, 2024–present)
- Van Williams – drums (1994–2011, 2024–present)
- Berzan Önen – lead vocals (2026–present)
- Jack Cattoi – guitars (2026–present)
- Semir Özerkan – bass, backing vocals (2026–present)

Former members

- Warrel Dane – lead vocals (1992–2011; died 2017)
- Jim Sheppard – bass (1992–2011)
- Mark Arrington – drums (1992–1994)
- Pat O'Brien – guitars (1996–1997)
- Tim Calvert – guitars (1997–2000; died 2018)
- Steve Smyth – guitars (2004–2006)

Live members

- Curran Murphy – guitars (2000–2001, 2003–2004)
- Adam Gardner – percussion (1995–1996)
- James MacDonough – bass (2006)
- Chris Broderick – guitars (2001–2003, 2006–2007)
- Tim Johnston – bass (2007)
- Attila Vörös – guitars (2010–2011)
- Dagna Silesia – bass (2011)

== Discography ==
Studio albums

- Nevermore (1995)
- The Politics of Ecstasy (1996)
- Dreaming Neon Black (1999)
- Dead Heart in a Dead World (2000)
- Enemies of Reality (2003)
- This Godless Endeavor (2005)
- The Obsidian Conspiracy (2010)
