= The Obsidian Conspiracy =

Studio album by Nevermore
- Released: June 8, 2010
- Recorded: August–October 2009
- Genres: Progressive metal, thrash metal
- Length: 45:01; 51:13 (limited box-set edition)
- Label: Century Media
- Producer: Peter Wichers

Nevermore chronology
Manifesto of Nevermore (2009)	The Obsidian Conspiracy (2010)

Professional ratings
Review scores
Source	Rating
AllMusic	3.5/5 stars
Bloody Disgusting	4.5/5 stars
Drop-D	8/10 stars
Metal Review	8/8 stars
The New Review	4/5 stars
PopMatters	8/10 stars
Rock Reviews	9/10 stars
Sputnikmusic	3/5 stars
Rock Hard	8/10 stars

The Obsidian Conspiracy is the seventh studio album by American heavy metal band Nevermore. It was released on June 8, 2010, in North America by Century Media and at the end of May in Europe. This was Nevermore's final album before they went on a thirteen-year hiatus between mid-2011 and late 2024, following the departures of guitarist Jeff Loomis and drummer Van Williams. It would also be the band's final studio album to feature frontman Warrel Dane, who died in 2017.

The Obsidian Conspiracy was met with generally positive reviews. It was the band's first album to chart in Austria, Belgium, the United Kingdom, and the United States Billboard 200.

== Writing and recording ==
Nevermore, having written 13 new songs, entered Wichers Studio in North Carolina in August 2009 to record the album. Van Williams completed recording the drumming on the album by August 17 in Seattle. The entire recording process was finished in October.

Warrel Dane commented on the writing process: "These songs are full of newfound rage, lyrically and musically. Jeff Loomis has come up with some amazing new riffs that will no doubt please old and new fans alike. Also, I think the combination of Peter and Andy (production and mixing) will result in something very, very special."

Jeff Loomis commented on the writing of the album: "I think that with the new Nevermore, it still sounds like the band, but I think I'm giving Warrel a little bit more room this time around for more vocals rather than all the notey, kind of complex stuff and all that. So this time around, it's just a little bit more wide open musically for him to really be able to do whatever he wants vocally. So we'll see what happens. It's gonna be an interesting album for us, for sure."

Loomis also stated that Peter Wichers had a major role in the songwriting, encouraging him to "cut out the fat and make the songs catchier and hookier," thus creating a simplistic and stripped-down sound that differs from the original 7–8 minute complex tracks Loomis initially wanted to record.

== Track listing ==
All lyrics are written by Warrel Dane; all music is composed by Jeff Loomis.

No.	Title	Length
1.	"The Termination Proclamation"	3:12
2.	"Your Poison Throne"	3:54
3.	"Moonrise (Through Mirrors of Death)"	4:03
4.	"And the Maiden Spoke"	5:00
5.	"Emptiness Unobstructed"	4:39
6.	"The Blue Marble and the New Soul"	4:41
7.	"Without Morals"	4:19
8.	"The Day You Built the Wall"	4:23
9.	"She Comes in Colors"	5:34
10.	"The Obsidian Conspiracy"	5:16

Limited edition bonus tracks
No.	Title	Length
11.	"Temptation" (The Tea Party cover)	3:26
12.	"The Crystal Ship" (The Doors cover)	2:49
13.	"The Purist's Drug"	4:45

== Personnel ==
=== Nevermore ===
- Warrel Dane – vocals
- Jeff Loomis – guitars
- Jim Sheppard – bass
- Van Williams – drums

=== Production ===
- Peter Wichers – production, engineering
- Andy Sneap – mixing, mastering
- Travis Smith – cover art

== Charts ==
Chart (2010)	Peak position
Austrian Albums (Ö3 Austria)	34
Belgian Albums (Ultratop Flanders)	87
Canadian Albums (Nielsen SoundScan)	94
Dutch Albums (Album Top 100)	69
Finnish Albums (Suomen virallinen lista)	35
French Albums (SNEP)	108
German Albums (Offizielle Top 100)	13
Greek Albums (IFPI)	3
Hungarian Albums (MAHASZ)	27
Swedish Albums (Sverigetopplistan)	41
Swiss Albums (Schweizer Hitparade)	40
UK Rock & Metal Albums (Official Charts)	18
US Billboard 200	132
US Independent Albums (Billboard)	18
US Indie Store Album Sales (Billboard)	19
US Top Hard Rock Albums (Billboard)	13
US Top Rock Albums (Billboard)	41

== Release history ==
Region	Date
Australia	May 28, 2010
Austria	May 28, 2010
Germany	May 28, 2010
Switzerland	May 28, 2010
Denmark	May 31, 2010
France	May 31, 2010
Greece	May 31, 2010
Norway	May 31, 2010
Portugal	May 31, 2010
United Kingdom	May 31, 2010
Italy	June 1, 2010
Spain	June 1, 2010
Finland	June 2, 2010
Sweden	June 2, 2010
Brazil	June 6, 2010
United States	June 8, 2010
Japan	July 21, 2010
