= The Year of the Voyager =

Video by Nevermore
- Released: October 20, 2008
- Recorded: October 11, 2006, in Bochum, Germany at the Zeche; September 2, 2005, in Montreal, Quebec, Canada at Bell Centre; March 4, 2006, in Katowice, Poland at Spodek; August 4, 2006, in Germany at Wacken Open Air; September 28, 2001, in Los Angeles at the Roxy
- Genres: Progressive metal, heavy metal, thrash metal
- Length: 2:06:01 (DVD 1)
- Label: Century Media

Nevermore chronology
| This Godless Endeavor (2005) | The Year of the Voyager (2008) | Manifesto of Nevermore (2009) |

Alternative cover
- CD cover

The Year of the Voyager is a live release by American heavy metal band Nevermore, issued in multiple formats, including 2DVD+2CD, 2DVD, 2CD and 3LP editions. It was released in Europe on October 20, 2008, and in North America on November 25, 2008, via Century Media. The set covers the This Godless Endeavor touring cycle, starting with live footage from the U.S. Gigantour 2005, the Metal Mania festival 2006 in Poland, the Wacken Open Air festival in 2006 in Germany and the main DVD show recorded at the Zeche in Bochum, Germany, on October 11, 2006. Bonus material includes two songs recorded at the Century Media USA 10th Anniversary Party at The Roxy in Los Angeles on September 28, 2001, all promo videos and an interview with singer Warrel Dane which was recorded at the Roax Film Studios in Berlin in the spring of 2008.

The Year of the Voyager was released as a limited-edition 2DVD+2CD, standard 2DVD, standard 2CD and limited 3LP (the latter two containing the audio from the main show in Bochum only).

== Background ==
Most of the performances were recorded in 2005–2006, during the This Godless Endeavor touring cycle, and the DVD was released after Steve Smyth's departure from the band. In an October 2008 interview with Metal Hammer Italia, Dane described it as a comprehensive record of the band's experiences in the preceding years. He said Nevermore had toured for more than a year and accumulated enough concert experience to justify a substantial live release.

== Recording ==
The principal concert was recorded at the Zeche club in Bochum on 11 October 2006, after the original 12 September recording was cancelled because of Dane's infection. Dane said the rescheduled show was one of the band's strongest of the entire tour, praising both the musicians' performances and the audience's response. He also said the recording had to succeed, since another opportunity would have been difficult to arrange after the cancellation.

Chris Broderick played second guitar at the concert in place of Smyth, whose kidney problems had interrupted his participation in the tour. The set included songs from every Nevermore album up to that point, among them "Matricide," "The Learning," "I Am the Dog," "Dreaming Neon Black" and a "What Tomorrow Knows/Garden of Grey" medley, and it closed with the title track of This Godless Endeavor.

== Content ==
The DVD included footage from five concerts. The second disc contained:

- 28 September 2001, The Roxy, Los Angeles: two performances from Century Media's tenth-anniversary celebration
- 2 September 2005, Gigantour, Montreal: "Born" and "Enemies of Reality"
- 4 March 2006, Metal Mania, Katowice: four songs, including "The Seven Tongues of God"
- 4 August 2006, Wacken Open Air, Germany: four songs, including "Engines of Hate"

The bonus disc also included the band's promotional music videos and an interview with Dane, filmed at Roax Film Studios in Berlin in spring 2008.

== Delay ==
In a February 2009 interview with The Metal Circus, the band was asked why the DVD had taken about three years to appear. The answer given was that the delay was not caused by legal difficulties but by dissatisfaction with the video editing. Dane returned to Germany to take part in the editing, which caused them to miss the intended release date and pushed publication back further.

== Release and reception ==
Century Media held a premiere at the Metropolis Cinema in Bochum on 15 September 2008, attended by Dane and Jeff Loomis, with a further screening and release party scheduled for Berlin on 11 October.

The DVD reached No. 82 on the German DVD chart. In a statement after the chart entry, the band thanked fans and confirmed they were working on new Nevermore material.

Metal Hammer Italia reviewed the DVD favourably, praising the band's technical performance, the atmosphere at Bochum and the career-spanning song selection, and particularly valuing the historical concert footage on the second disc.

== DVD ==
=== Disc 1 ===
==== Zeche in Bochum, Germany (October 11, 2006) ====
1. "Intro"
2. "Final Product"
3. "My Acid Words"
4. "What Tomorrow Knows/Garden of Grey"
5. "Next in Line"
6. "Enemies of Reality"
7. "I, Voyager"
8. "The Politics of Ecstasy"
9. "The River Dragon Has Come"
10. "I Am the Dog"
11. "Dreaming Neon Black"
12. "Matricide"
13. "Dead Heart in a Dead World"
14. "Noumenon" (from tape)
15. "Inside Four Walls"
16. "The Learning"
17. "Sentient 6"
18. "Narcosynthesis"
19. "The Heart Collector"
20. "Born"
21. "This Godless Endeavor"

=== Disc 2 ===
==== Gigantour, Bell Centre, Montreal, Canada (September 2, 2005) ====
1. "Born"
2. "Enemies of Reality"

==== Metal Mania Festival, Poland (March 4, 2006) ====
1. "Final Product"
2. "The Heart Collector"
3. "Enemies of Reality"
4. "The Seven Tongues of God"

==== Wacken Open Air, Germany (August 4, 2006) ====
1. "Final Product"
2. "Narcosynthesis"
3. "Engines of Hate"
4. "Born"

==== Century Media USA 10th Anniversary Party, The Roxy, Los Angeles (September 28, 2001) ====
1. "Engines of Hate"
2. "Beyond Within"

==== Promotional videos ====
1. "What Tomorrow Knows"
2. "Next in Line"
3. "Believe in Nothing"
4. "I, Voyager"
5. "Enemies of Reality"
6. "Final Product"
7. "Born"
8. "Narcosynthesis"

==== Trailers ====
1. Nevermore – "The Year of the Voyager"
2. Paradise Lost – "Over the Madness"
3. Strapping Young Lad – "1994–2006 Chaos Years"

== CD ==
Disc 1

1. "Final Product"
2. "My Acid Words"
3. "What Tomorrow Knows/Garden of Grey"
4. "Next in Line"
5. "Enemies of Reality"
6. "I, Voyager"
7. "The Politics of Ecstasy"
8. "The River Dragon Has Come"
9. "I Am the Dog"
10. "Dreaming Neon Black"

Disc 2

1. "Matricide"
2. "Dead Heart in a Dead World"
3. "Inside Four Walls"
4. "The Learning"
5. "Sentient 6"
6. "Narcosynthesis"
7. "The Heart Collector"
8. "Born"
9. "This Godless Endeavor"

== Band lineup ==
=== Bochum & Wacken ===
- Warrel Dane – vocals
- Jeff Loomis – guitar
- Chris Broderick – guitar
- Jim Sheppard – bass
- Van Williams – drums

=== Gigantour & Metal Mania ===
- Warrel Dane – vocals
- Jeff Loomis – guitar
- Steve Smyth – guitar
- Jim Sheppard – bass
- Van Williams – drums

=== Live at The Roxy ===
- Warrel Dane – vocals
- Jeff Loomis – guitar
- Curran Murphy – guitar
- Jim Sheppard – bass
- Van Williams – drums
