= In Memory =

EP by Nevermore
- Released: July 23, 1996
- Recorded: April–May 1996
- Studios: Village Productions, Tornillo, Texas
- Genres: Power metal, progressive metal
- Length: 26:09
- Label: Century Media
- Producer: Neil Kernon

Nevermore chronology
Nevermore (1995)	In Memory (1996)	The Politics of Ecstasy (1996)

Professional ratings
Review scores
Source	Rating
AllMusic	3/5 stars
Collector's Guide to Heavy Metal	8/10
Rock Hard	9.5/10

In Memory is an EP by American heavy metal band Nevermore. It was recorded in April and May 1996 and released on July 23, 1996. It features a Bauhaus medley. It was re-issued in 2006 with five bonus tracks, which are all demos of songs from the next full-length album, The Politics of Ecstasy.

"Matricide" and "The Sorrowed Man" had both been previously recorded under the titles "Mother Earth" and "Forever", respectively, in a 1990 demo by Sanctuary, as well as with their current titles in the 1992 Nevermore demo entitled Utopia.

It was their first release to feature Pat O'Brien on rhythm guitars and also the first in which Van Williams played all drum tracks.

== Track listing ==
All tracks are written by Warrel Dane and Jeff Loomis, except where noted.

No.	Title	Length
1.	"Optimist or Pessimist"	3:38
2.	"Matricide"	5:21
3.	"In Memory"	7:05
4.	"Silent Hedges"/"Double Dare" (P. Murphy/Bauhaus) (Bauhaus cover)	4:41
5.	"The Sorrowed Man"	5:24

2006 bonus tracks
No.	Title	Length
6.	"The Tiananmen Man" (Demo)	5:44
7.	"The Seven Tongues of God" (Demo)	5:43
8.	"Passenger" (Demo)	5:11
9.	"This Sacrament" (Demo)	5:53
10.	"42147" (Instrumental Demo)	4:37

== Personnel ==
Nevermore

- Warrel Dane – vocals
- Jeff Loomis – guitar, bass and drum programming on 2006 bonus tracks
- Pat O'Brien – guitar
- Jim Sheppard – bass
- Van Williams – drums

Production

- Neil Kernon – producer, recording and mixing
- Perry Cunningham – remastering (2006 reissue)
