= The Politics of Ecstasy (Nevermore album) =

Studio album by Nevermore
- Released: November 5, 1996
- Recorded: 1996
- Studios: Village Productions in Tornillo, Texas
- Genres: Progressive metal; thrash metal; power metal
- Length: 62:24
- Label: Century Media
- Producer: Neil Kernon

Nevermore chronology
In Memory (1996)	The Politics of Ecstasy (1996)	Dreaming Neon Black (1999)

Century Media re-release

Professional ratings
Review scores
Source	Rating
AllMusic	4.5/5 stars
Chronicles of Chaos	9/10
Collector's Guide to Heavy Metal	9/10
Rock Hard	9/10

The Politics of Ecstasy is the second studio album by American heavy metal band Nevermore, released on November 5, 1996, by Century Media Records. Produced by Neil Kernon, it was the band's first full-length album to feature guitarist Pat O'Brien, who joined Jeff Loomis in a two-guitar line-up. The album combines elements of progressive metal, thrash metal and power metal, featuring more elaborate arrangements and a heavier sound than the band's self-titled debut.

The album takes its name from Timothy Leary's book The Politics of Ecstasy, whose opening chapter, "The Seven Tongues of God", also provided the title of the album's opening track.

== Background and recording ==
Following the release of their self-titled debut album in 1995 and the In Memory EP in 1996, Nevermore recorded their second studio album with a five-piece line-up consisting of vocalist Warrel Dane, guitarists Jeff Loomis and Pat O'Brien, bassist Jim Sheppard and drummer Van Williams. It was the band's only studio album to feature O'Brien, who subsequently joined Cannibal Corpse.

Demo versions of The Tiananmen Man, The Seven Tongues Of God, Passenger, This Sacrament and 42147 were included on the 2006 reissue of In Memory.

The album was recorded at Village Productions in Tornillo, Texas, with Neil Kernon serving as producer and handling recording and mixing. Joe Gastwirt mastered the recordings at Ocean View Digital in Los Angeles.

Unlike the band's debut, which had been assembled from earlier demo recordings, The Politics of Ecstasy was recorded as a full-length studio album. The expanded guitar line-up enabled more elaborate arrangements, with Loomis and O'Brien performing complementary guitar parts throughout the recording.

== Music and lyrics ==
The Politics of Ecstasy incorporates elements of progressive, thrash and power metal, combining complex guitar arrangements, changes in tempo and rhythm, and Warrel Dane's melodic and aggressive vocal styles. In a contemporary review for Lollipop Magazine, Scott Hefflon highlighted the interplay between the guitars, bass and drums, as well as the layering of Dane's vocals and the album's comparatively elaborate production. He also noted the use of samples and studio effects within the arrangements.

The album's title was taken from The Politics of Ecstasy, a book by psychologist and counterculture figure Timothy Leary. The book's opening chapter, "The Seven Tongues of God", shares its title with the album's first track. The song "Next in Line" incorporates a spoken-word sample from the 1990 psychological horror film Jacob's Ladder, directed by Adrian Lyne.

The album also includes "The Tiananmen Man", whose title refers to the unidentified protester photographed standing before a column of tanks during the 1989 Tiananmen Square protests and massacre. "Precognition" is a short instrumental composition, while the closing track, "The Learning", runs for nearly ten minutes.

== Release and promotion ==
The Politics of Ecstasy was released by Century Media Records on November 5, 1996. A music video was produced for "Next in Line".

On September 5, 2006, Century Media released a remastered edition of the album as part of a series of reissues of Nevermore's early recordings. The reissue included revised artwork, expanded liner notes written by music journalist Martin Popoff with contributions from Warrel Dane, and a bonus cover of "Love Bites" by Judas Priest. An enhanced CD edition also included the music video for "Next in Line".

== Critical reception ==
In a contemporary review published in November 1996, Scott Hefflon of Lollipop Magazine praised the album's musicianship, vocal performances and production. Comparing aspects of Nevermore's sound to Iron Maiden and Queensrÿche, he emphasised the band's heavier musical approach and the complexity of its arrangements. Hefflon considered the album a significant improvement on the band's self-titled debut, particularly praising the title track and Neil Kernon's production.

Reviewing the 2006 reissue for Blabbermouth.net, Scott Alisoglu awarded the album 8.5 out of 10. He regarded The Politics of Ecstasy as a pivotal release in Nevermore's development, arguing that it helped establish the band's distinctive combination of heavy metal styles, dark melodies and intellectually oriented lyrics. He also praised the bonus recording of Judas Priest's "Love Bites".

== Track listing ==
All lyrics are written by Warrel Dane; all music is composed by Jeff Loomis (except where noted).

No.	Title	Music	Length
1.	"The Seven Tongues of God"	Loomis, O’Brien	5:59
2.	"This Sacrament"		5:10
3.	"Next in Line"		5:34
4.	"Passenger"		5:26
5.	"The Politics of Ecstasy"		7:57
6.	"Lost"		4:15
7.	"The Tiananmen Man"		5:25
8.	"Precognition"		1:37
9.	"42147"		4:59
10.	"The Learning" (9:43 on 2006 reissue)	Loomis, O’Brien	16:01

=== 2006 reissue bonus track ===
No.	Title	Writer(s)	Length
11.	"Love Bites" (Judas Priest cover)	Rob Halford, K.K. Downing, Glenn Tipton	11:40

There is a hidden track (1:19) after "The Learning" ("Love Bites" in the 2006 reissue), after 5 minutes of silence. The reissue also includes a music video for Next in Line.

== Personnel ==
- Warrel Dane – vocals
- Jeff Loomis – guitar
- Pat O'Brien – guitar
- Jim Sheppard – bass
- Van Williams – drums
- Produced, recorded and mixed by Neil Kernon
