= This Godless Endeavor =

2005 studio album by Nevermore

Studio album by Nevermore
- Released: July 26, 2005
- Studios: Backstage Recording Studios, UK
- Genres: Progressive metal, thrash metal
- Length: 57:18
- Label: Century Media
- Producer: Andy Sneap

Nevermore chronology
Enemies of Reality (2003)	This Godless Endeavor (2005)	The Year of the Voyager (2008)

This Godless Endeavor is the sixth studio album by American heavy metal band Nevermore, released on July 26, 2005. The album was produced by Andy Sneap and is distributed by Century Media Records.

== Overview ==
Guitarist Jeff Loomis revealed in an interview that This Godless Endeavor is not a concept album but a "topic-to-topic" album, with all the songs addressing "real-life issues" that can "allegorically refer to the loss of identity, the system that we live in, the meaning of life, the denouncement of God as a solution to all the problems caused by the conflicts initiated by various religions in different parts of the world. It's basically about human beings."

Notably, the track "A Future Uncertain" has very similar lyrics and a main riff to the track "World Unborn" from their 1992 demos.

In the middle of the song "Sentient 6," there is a message played backwards that states, "I am the bringer of the end, fear me, I am the beast that is technology." "Sentient 6" refers to a robot or android programmed to annihilate humankind but ultimately envies humanity for their possession of emotion and a soul. The content is paradoxical and written from the perspective of the machine. The song also picks up lyrically where "The Learning" left off in The Politics of Ecstasy. Additionally, it appears to have many parallels with the story of V'ger from Star Trek: The Motion Picture.

The music video for "Born" premiered on the January 27, 2006 edition of Headbangers Ball. It was shot by acclaimed director Derek Dale, resulting in what the band considers "a thought-provoking conceptual piece."

== Title ==
The title came from an abandoned side project that Dane had discussed with his longtime friend Tracy. While brainstorming a name for it, Dane spontaneously used the phrase "this godless endeavor." After the project was dropped, he reused the phrase in a Nevermore song and then proposed it as the album's title. Loomis offered an additional explanation in Metal Italia: Dane was interested in the intersection of religion, sex and political science.

== Background and writing ==
After Dead Heart in a Dead World and Enemies of Reality, on which Loomis was the sole studio guitarist, Nevermore recruited Steve Smyth as a permanent second guitarist. Loomis said the two had known each other for years and that Smyth's demos were stylistically closer to Nevermore than those of Chris Broderick, who had previously filled in live. He felt their shared guitar influences helped them complement one another.

Loomis said Smyth's involvement returned the band to something like the collaborative approach of The Politics of Ecstasy, rather than most material originating with himself. Smyth composed three songs, "Born," "Bittersweet Feast" and "Sell My Heart for Stones." Jim Sheppard helped compose "Medicated Nation," and Loomis was the principal composer of the remaining material. The material was developed over several months.

Loomis said the band had been satisfied with the songs on Enemies of Reality but deeply unhappy with the finished recording, and wanted to make an album that restored confidence in its work. This time the band had a renewed Century Media contract and Andy Sneap was available, so they could concentrate on recording in a more suitable environment.

== Recording ==
Nevermore recorded the album with Andy Sneap at his rural studio in Derbyshire, England, which Loomis said was their first album recorded outside the United States.

Dane said that concerts and promotional commitments, including a concert in Greece, had been scheduled on the assumption that the album would be finished. When recording overran, the band had to interrupt the sessions, and completion ended up about a month behind schedule.

Loomis estimated about two months in the studio, with roughly six weeks of actual recording. He described the sequence as follows: he first recorded a complete guitar guide track against a click track, after which Van Williams recorded the drums, followed by the rhythm guitars, Sheppard's bass, Dane's vocals and finally the lead guitar solos. Most songs used four rhythm-guitar tracks, two by Loomis on one side and two by Smyth on the other. Sneap encouraged Loomis to improvise solos rather than plan every phrase; Loomis said many solos developed spontaneously late at night, although others, including the title track, were more deliberately composed, and he credited Sneap with making the performances more energetic.

In July 2005, Dane said it was the first album he had recorded sober. He admitted he had been frightened by the prospect because alcohol had previously been a psychological crutch during recording. Sneap helped him through the process, and as the studio had exercise facilities and there was little else to do, Dane spent considerable time working out. He was delighted with the resulting vocal performances and credited Sneap's guidance for much of the improvement.

== Lyrics and themes ==
Loomis said Dane was extremely private about his lyrics, sometimes not showing them even to his bandmates until he recorded his vocals. Loomis identified the subject of "My Acid Words" as Dane's difficult relationship with his older brother. The title track deals with religion, religious fundamentalism and the ways competing beliefs can divide people and lead to conflict. Loomis particularly liked "Born," composed by Smyth, for its mixture of speed- and death-metal influences and its strong chorus.

When people kept asking whether Nevermore had recorded another concept album, Dane joked in Chronicles of Chaos about inventing an imaginary sequel to Operation: Mindcrime.

== Artwork ==
The band chose Hugh Syme rather than their established collaborator Travis Smith because they wanted a different visual direction. Dane found an existing Syme artwork that he thought resembled the cover of Sanctuary's Into the Mirror Black, and Syme agreed to modify it for the album.

The child on the cover is Syme's daughter, as both Dane and Loomis mentioned in interviews. Loomis cautioned that the image was chosen mainly for its darkness and mysterious atmosphere rather than because it illustrated the album's lyrical subjects.

== Cover version ==
The band also recorded Ozzy Osbourne's "Revelation (Mother Earth)." Unlike their heavily reworked versions of "The Sound of Silence" and "Love Bites," this arrangement stayed close to the original. Loomis, Smyth and Sneap all admired Randy Rhoads, and Loomis said they used a guitar pick that had belonged to Rhoads, which Sneap owned, during recording. The cover was considered for the album but left off because the record was already about an hour long, and Loomis expected it to appear as a bonus track.

== Touring ==
In 2005, Nevermore joined Megadeth's inaugural Gigantour, which Loomis described as an opportunity to reach much larger American audiences. With a set of only about 30 minutes, the band planned rotating setlists, and the nearly nine-minute title track was impractical for that format. Loomis said constant touring had made the band considerably stronger.

== Reception ==
Professional ratings
Review scores
Source	Rating
AllMusic	4/5 stars
PopMatters	8/10 stars
Anti Music	4/5 stars
Chronicles of Chaos	10/10 stars
Metal Eater	10/10 stars
Rock Hard	10/10 stars
Sea of Tranquility	4.5/5 stars
Maelstrom	9/10 stars
Metal Crypt	4.6/5 stars
Metal Storm	10/10 stars

This Godless Endeavor ranked at number 2 in Unrestrained! magazine's top 20 albums of 2005. It was also ranked #88 on the October 2006 issue of Guitar World magazine's list of the greatest 100 guitar albums of all time.

AllMusic's Eduardo Rivadavia praised "the soaring vocals of Warrel Dane and lead guitar heroics of Jeff Loomis" as "twin beacons shining out from the band's gloriously metallic bulk." He declared, "Don't forget the near-nine-minute title track, which culminates in what must surely stand as one of Nevermore's most consistent LPs in suitably epic fashion. Indeed, American-bred heavy metal doesn't get any better than this."

The album's review in PopMatters noted the complex influences, highlighting "traces of '80s progressive metal greats such as Queensrÿche, Savatage, and Fates Warning," as well as "monstrous doses of European elements, such as blazingly fast tempos, tautly performed arrangements, and unrelenting blastbeats." In one of PopMatters' only complaints, the song "Bittersweet Feast" was considered "one track too many on an otherwise extraordinary album." Overall, within Nevermore's catalog, This Godless Endeavor was touted as "yet another chapter in what has become one of the more impressive album streaks in recent metal history."

The German Rock Hard voted it "Album of the Month" and called it "the best and most intense metal album of the decade." The album was later ranked number 256 in their book The 500 Greatest Rock & Metal Albums of All Time.

== Track listing ==
No.	Title	Writer(s)	Length
1.	"Born"	Jeff Loomis, Warrel Dane	5:05
2.	"Final Product"	Loomis, Dane	4:21
3.	"My Acid Words"	Loomis, Dane	5:41
4.	"Bittersweet Feast"	Steve Smyth, Dane	5:01
5.	"Sentient 6"	Loomis, Dane	6:58
6.	"Medicated Nation"	Jim Sheppard, Dane, Loomis	4:01
7.	"The Holocaust of Thought" (Instrumental)	Sheppard	1:27
8.	"Sell My Heart for Stones"	Smyth, Dane	5:18
9.	"The Psalm of Lydia"	Loomis, Dane	4:16
10.	"A Future Uncertain"	Smyth, Dane	6:07
11.	"This Godless Endeavor"	Loomis, Dane	8:55

== In popular culture ==
In the Marvel comic Runaways, the character Chase Stein mentions the track "The Psalm of Lydia" to a co-worker as a flirt while at his job at a radio station.

== Personnel ==
Nevermore:

- Warrel Dane – lead vocals
- Jeff Loomis – guitar
- Steve Smyth – guitar
- Jim Sheppard – bass
- Van Williams – drums

Guest musicians:

- James Murphy – special guest lead guitar on "The Holocaust of Thought"

Production:

- Andy Sneap – production, engineering, mixing, mastering
- Hugh Syme – cover art
- Olle Carlsson – photography
- Stefan Wibbeke – layout and booklet design

== Chart positions ==
Chart (2005)	Peak position
Dutch Albums Chart	73
French Albums Chart	134
German Albums Chart	26
Swiss Albums Chart	63
US Independent Albums	23
US Top Heatseekers	11
