= Nevermore (Nevermore album) =

Studio album by Nevermore
- Released: February 14, 1995
- Studio: Robert Lang (Shoreline, Washington)
- Genres: Power metal; thrash metal; progressive metal
- Length: 42:55
- Label: Century Media
- Producer: Neil Kernon

Nevermore chronology
Demo 1994 (1994)	Nevermore (1995)	In Memory (1996)

Professional ratings
Review scores
Source	Rating
AllMusic	3/5 stars
Collector's Guide to Heavy Metal	7/10
Metal Storm	7.6/10
Rock Hard	9.5/10

Nevermore is the debut studio album by American heavy metal band Nevermore, released in February 1995 by Century Media Records. Produced by Neil Kernon, the album was assembled from two demo recording sessions originally undertaken following the dissolution of Sanctuary, whose former members Warrel Dane, Jim Sheppard and Jeff Loomis formed the new band.

The album features drummer Mark Arrington on four of its eight tracks and his successor, Van Williams, on the remaining four. Combining elements of progressive metal, thrash metal and power metal, Nevermore marked the beginning of the band's recording career and established a heavier musical direction than that of Sanctuary.

== Background and recording ==
Following the dissolution of Sanctuary in 1992, vocalist Warrel Dane, bassist Jim Sheppard and guitarist Jeff Loomis formed Nevermore in Seattle, Washington. The group recorded two demo sessions with producer Neil Kernon before securing a contract with Century Media Records. Although the recordings were originally intended as demos rather than a studio album, Century Media selected material from both sessions, rearranged the track sequence and had the recordings remastered for commercial release. The resulting album, Nevermore, was released in February 1995.

Nevermore's early repertoire included material that did not appear on the debut album. The band's 1992 ten-track demo, Utopia, contained early recordings of "Godmoney", "Garden of Gray" and "The Hurting Words", alongside songs such as "The Dreaming Mind", "World Unborn", "Chances Three" and "Utopia". It also featured "Matricide" and "The Sorrowed Man", both originating from Sanctuary's final years, which were subsequently re-recorded for Nevermore's 1996 EP In Memory. Another early composition, "The World Unborn", was later reworked for the band's sixth studio album, This Godless Endeavor (2005). Several other early demo recordings were officially released as bonus tracks on the 2006 reissue of Nevermore.

The album was recorded at Robert Lang Studios in Washington and mixed at Pakaderm Studios in California and Granny's House in Nevada. Kernon handled the recording and mixing, while Joe Gastwirt mastered the album. Drummer Mark Arrington, who had participated in the band's early recordings, performed on four tracks: "What Tomorrow Knows", "Garden of Gray", "The Hurting Words" and "Godmoney". His successor, Van Williams, played on the remaining four tracks, making Nevermore the only studio album to feature Arrington.

In a retrospective interview, Dane described the album as closer to a demo than a conventional studio début, noting its comparatively raw sound and the imperfections associated with the band's early development.

The band's songwriting was principally divided between guitarist Jeff Loomis, who composed the music, and vocalist Warrel Dane, who wrote the lyrics. Loomis later described Nevermore's usual writing process as beginning with instrumental compositions, which he would present to Dane for lyrical development before the completed songs were rehearsed by the band. Recalling Nevermore's formation, Loomis stated that the musicians had begun writing material for two separate demos, both of which subsequently formed the basis of their debut album.

== Music and lyrics ==
The album combines elements of power metal, thrash metal and progressive metal. While retaining aspects of Sanctuary's earlier sound, it introduced a heavier approach characterised by prominent guitar riffs, shifts in tempo and Dane's wide-ranging vocal delivery. In a retrospective review, AllMusic described the album as a musical progression from Sanctuary, highlighting its greater emphasis on progressive arrangements and identifying influences from Queensrÿche in "The Sanity Assassin" and "The Hurting Words".

== Release and reception ==
Nevermore was released by Century Media Records in February 1995. A music video was produced for the opening track, "What Tomorrow Knows", which was later included on the band's compilation Manifesto of Nevermore (2009).

In a contemporary review published by Lollipop Magazine in March 1995, Scott Hefflon praised the album's heavy guitar sound, changes in tempo and Dane's vocal range. He particularly highlighted Loomis's guitar playing and the song "Garden of Gray", comparing aspects of the band's music to Queensrÿche while emphasising its heavier approach.

In September 2006, Century Media reissued the album with remastered audio, five additional tracks drawn from the band's early demos and the music video for "What Tomorrow Knows". The reissue also featured revised artwork and liner notes by music journalist Martin Popoff, incorporating contributions from Dane.

== Track listing ==
All lyrics are written by Warrel Dane; all music is composed by Jeff Loomis.

No.	Title	Length
1.	"What Tomorrow Knows"	5:11
2.	"C.B.F (Chrome Black Future)"	6:02
3.	"The Sanity Assassin"	6:21
4.	"Garden of Gray"	4:48
5.	"Sea of Possibilities"	4:18
6.	"The Hurting Words"	6:17
7.	"Timothy Leary"	5:12
8.	"Godmoney"	4:43

2006 reissue bonus tracks
No.	Title	Length
9.	"The System's Failing"
10.	"The Dreaming Mind" (1992 Demo)
11.	"World Unborn" (1992 Demo)
12.	"Chances Three" (1992 Demo)
13.	"Utopia" (1992 Demo)

== Personnel ==
Nevermore

- Warrel Dane – vocals
- Jeff Loomis – guitar
- Jim Sheppard – bass
- Van Williams – drums on tracks 2, 3, 5 and 7

Additional

- Christine Rinehart – backing vocals on "Garden of Gray"
- Mark Arrington – drums on all other tracks

Production

- Neil Kernon – producer, recording and mixing
- Joe Gastwirt – mastering
- Perry Cunningham – remastering (2006 reissue)
