= Prevail =

Prevail may refer to:

- Prevail (rapper), a hip-hop artist from Vancouver
- Prevail (album), an album by death metal band Kataklysm
- Prevail I, a 2017 album by Canadian heavy metal band Kobra and the Lotus
- Prevail II, a 2018 album by Canadian heavy metal band Kobra and the Lotus
- USNS Prevail, a United States Navy vessel
