= Words of the Prophets =

Words of the Prophets (2015)

EP by Kobra and the Lotus
- Released: August 28, 2015
- Genre: Heavy metal
- Length: 22:33
- Label: Titan Music
- Producer: Johnny K

Kobra and the Lotus chronology
High Priestess (2014)	Words of the Prophets (2015) (2015)	Prevail I (2017)

Words of the Prophets is the first EP from Canadian heavy metal band Kobra and the Lotus. It was released on August 28, 2015 via Titan Music, and was produced by Johnny K.

== Background ==
The album consists of cover songs, as a tribute to the Canadian bands that the members of Kobra and the Lotus grew up listening to. On 23 June 2015, a music video for "Black Velvet" (originally recorded by Alannah Myles) was premiered via Revolver Magazine.

== Track listing ==
No.	Title	Length
1.	"Lay It on the Line" (originally performed by Triumph)	4:08
2.	"Sign of the Gypsy Queen" (originally performed by Lorence Hud; based on the April Wine version)	4:37
3.	"Black Velvet" (originally performed by Alannah Myles)	4:49
4.	"Let It Ride" (originally performed by Bachman-Turner Overdrive)	3:57
5.	"The Spirit of Radio" (originally performed by Rush)	5:00
Total length:		22:33

== Personnel ==
- Kobra Paige - lead vocals
- Jason Kulakowski - lead/rhythm guitars
- Brad Kennedy - bass

=== Additional personnel ===
- Elias Bones - drums
