= TNA Bound for Glory =

TNA Wrestling pay-per-view event series

Bound for Glory
- Logo used since 2024
- Promotion: Total Nonstop Action Wrestling
- First event: 2005
- Signature matches: Call Your Shot Gauntlet match

Bound for Glory is a professional wrestling pay-per-view (PPV) event produced annually in October by the American Total Nonstop Action Wrestling promotion. It is one of TNA's “Big Four” PPV events (along with Hard To Kill, Rebellion, and Slammiversary). The event was created in 2005 to serve as the company's flagship PPV event, similar to WWE's WrestleMania, in which wrestlers competed in various professional wrestling match types in what was the culmination of many feuds and storylines that occurred during the calendar year. As of November 2026, twenty-two events have occurred under the chronology, with the latest being the 2026 event taking place on October 11.

== History ==
Bound for Glory logo used from 2012 to 2016

The 2006 edition was the company's first three-hour monthly PPV event to take place outside of the Impact Zone (the sound stage owned by Universal Studios, and operated within Universal Studios Florida, from which the company's television series and much of their pay-per-views were produced), emanating from the Compuware Sports Arena in Plymouth Township, Michigan. The event would return to the Impact Zone for the 2016 edition. Bound for Glory IV, which took place at the Sears Centre in Hoffman Estates, Illinois, on October 12, 2008, was the only event under the chronology to have Roman numerals featured in its title.

From its inception in 2005 until 2013, all events were held in the United States. The 2014 event was held at Korakuen Hall in Tokyo, Japan, in conjunction with the Wrestle-1 promotion. The 2017 event was held at Aberdeen Pavilion in Ottawa, Ontario, Canada. It has been held in seven different U.S. states, where every event has been held in an indoor arena with the exception of 2005, 2016, 2018, 2020, and 2021. 2014 marked the first time since the inaugural event that the World Heavyweight Championship was not defended in the main event. To date, thirteen championship matches have taken place in the main event.

== Events ==
#	Event	Date	City	Venue	Main event	Ref.
1	Bound for Glory (2005)	October 23, 2005	Orlando, Florida	TNA Impact! Zone at Universal Studios Florida	Jeff Jarrett (c) vs. Rhino for the NWA World Heavyweight Championship, with Tito Ortiz as the special guest referee	
2	Bound for Glory (2006)	October 22, 2006	Plymouth Township, Michigan	Compuware Sports Arena	Jeff Jarrett (c) vs. Sting in a Title vs. Career match for the NWA World Heavyweight Championship, with Kurt Angle as the special guest enforcer	
3	Bound for Glory (2007)	October 14, 2007	Duluth, Georgia	Gwinnett Center	Kurt Angle (c) vs. Sting for the TNA World Heavyweight Championship	
4	Bound for Glory IV	October 12, 2008	Hoffman Estates, Illinois	Sears Centre Arena	Samoa Joe (c) vs. Sting for the TNA World Heavyweight Championship	
5	Bound for Glory (2009)	October 18, 2009	Irvine, California	Bren Events Center	A.J. Styles (c) vs. Sting for the TNA World Heavyweight Championship	
6	Bound for Glory (2010)	October 10, 2010	Daytona Beach, Florida	Ocean Center	Jeff Hardy vs. Kurt Angle vs. Mr. Anderson in a three-way match for the vacant TNA World Heavyweight Championship	
7	Bound for Glory (2011)	October 16, 2011	Philadelphia, Pennsylvania	Liacouras Center	Kurt Angle (c) vs. Bobby Roode for the TNA World Heavyweight Championship	
8	Bound for Glory (2012)	October 14, 2012	Phoenix, Arizona	GCU Arena	Austin Aries (c) vs. Jeff Hardy for the TNA World Heavyweight Championship	
9	Bound for Glory (2013)	October 20, 2013	San Diego, California	Viejas Arena	Bully Ray (c) vs. A.J. Styles in a No Disqualification match for the TNA World Heavyweight Championship	
10	Bound for Glory (2014)	October 12, 2014	Tokyo, Japan	Korakuen Hall	The Great Muta and Tajiri vs. James Storm and The Great Sanada	
11	Bound for Glory (2015)	October 4, 2015	Concord, North Carolina	Cabarrus Arena	Ethan Carter III (c) vs. Drew Galloway vs. Matt Hardy in a three-way match for the TNA World Heavyweight Championship, with Jeff Hardy as the special guest referee	
12	Bound for Glory (2016)	October 2, 2016	Orlando, Florida	Impact Zone at Universal Studios Florida	Lashley (c) vs. Ethan Carter III in a No Holds Barred match for the TNA World Heavyweight Championship	
13	Bound for Glory (2017)	November 5, 2017	Ottawa, Ontario, Canada	Aberdeen Pavilion	Eli Drake (c) vs. Johnny Impact for the Impact Global Championship	
14	Bound for Glory (2018)	October 14, 2018	New York City, New York	Melrose Ballroom	Austin Aries (c) vs. Johnny Impact for the Impact World Championship	
15	Bound for Glory (2019)	October 20, 2019	Villa Park, Illinois	Odeum Expo Center	Brian Cage (c) vs. Sami Callihan in a No Disqualification match for the Impact World Championship	
16	Bound for Glory (2020)	October 24, 2020	Nashville, Tennessee	Skyway Studios	Eric Young (c) vs. Rich Swann for the Impact World Championship	
17	Bound for Glory (2021)	October 23, 2021	Sunrise Manor, Nevada	Sam's Town Live	Christian Cage (c) vs. Josh Alexander for the Impact World Championship, then Josh Alexander (c) vs. Moose for the Impact World Championship (Moose immediately invoked his Call Your Shot Gauntlet championship match)	
18	Bound for Glory (2022)	October 7, 2022	Albany, New York	Washington Avenue Armory	Josh Alexander (c) vs. Eddie Edwards for the Impact World Championship	
19	Bound for Glory (2023)	October 21, 2023	Cicero, Illinois	Cicero Stadium	Alex Shelley (c) vs. Josh Alexander for the Impact World Championship	
20	Bound for Glory (2024)	October 26, 2024	Detroit, Michigan	Wayne State Fieldhouse	The System (Brian Myers and Eddie Edwards) (c) vs. The Hardys (Matt Hardy and Jeff Hardy) vs. ABC (Ace Austin and Chris Bey) in a Three-way Full Metal Mayhem match for the TNA World Tag Team Championship	
21	Bound for Glory (2025)	October 12, 2025	Lowell, Massachusetts	Tsongas Center	Trick Williams (c) vs. Mike Santana for the TNA World Championship	
22	Bound for Glory (2026)	October 11, 2026	Tampa, Florida	Yuengling Center	Nic Nemeth (c) vs. Leon Slater for the TNA World Championship	
(c) – refers to the champion(s) heading into the match

=== 2005 ===
==== Production ====
On June 19, 2005, at TNA's Slammiversary PPV event, TNA commentators Mike Tenay and Don West announced that the first Bound for Glory event would take place on October 23, 2005. Like previous monthly PPV events hosted by TNA, it was scheduled to take place at the TNA Impact! Zone, though no official announcement was made. A fanfest, which TNA calls "Total Nonstop InterAction", was also being planned as early as June 2005 to stress the event being their biggest of the year. On October 22, 2005, TNA held the second annual—the first being at TNA's Victory Road PPV event nearly a year earlier—Total Nonstop InterAction fanfest at the Doubletree Hotel in Orlando, Florida, where 800 fans were in attendance. The fanfest help gross US$45,000 in revenue for TNA. (Note: It is determined the proceeds are due to the fanfest, since Universal Orlando Resort does not allow TNA to charge for admission to shows held at the TNA Impact! Zone.)

==== Event ====
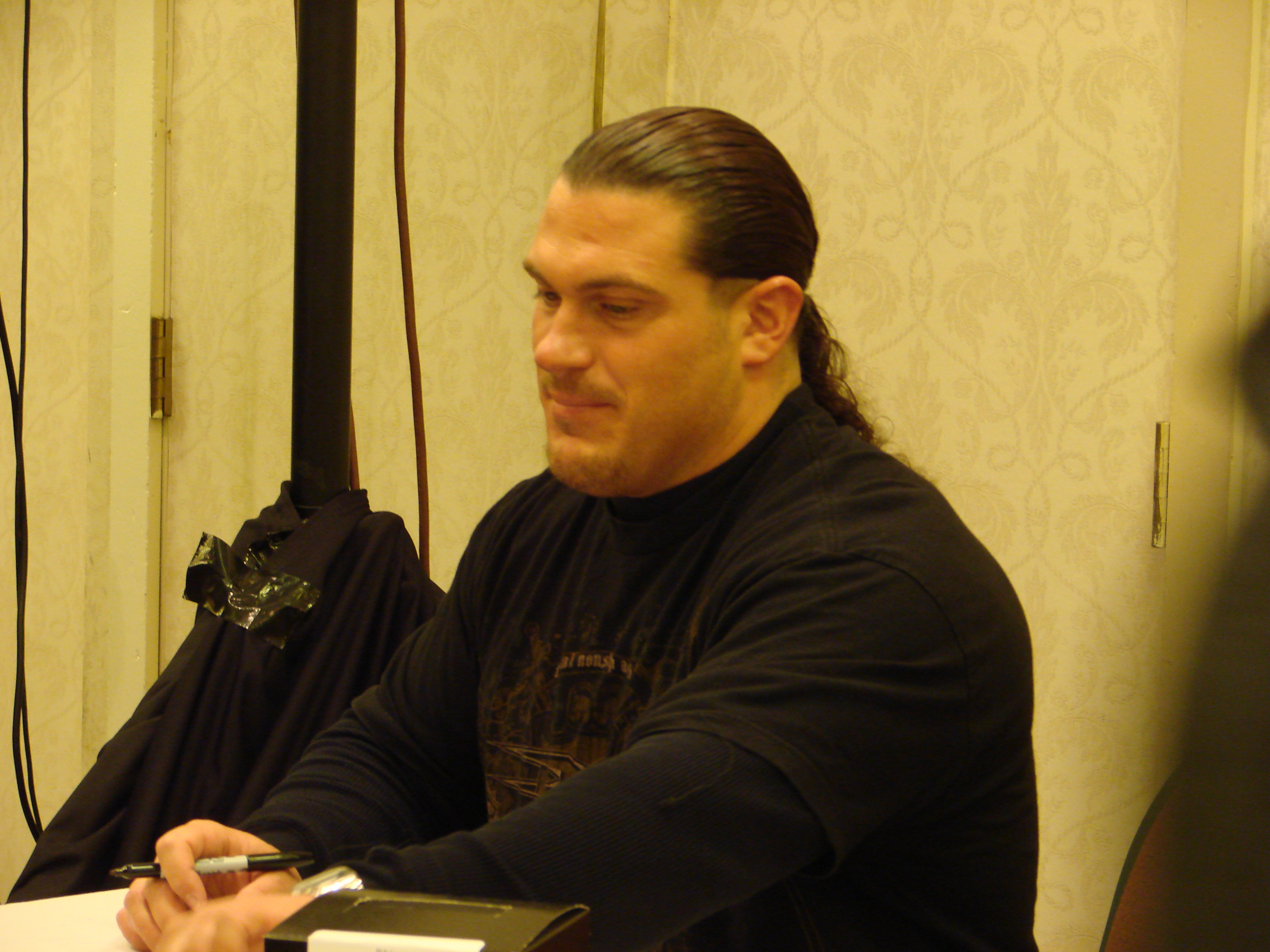
Terry Gerin (shown here in 2007), better known by his ring name "Rhino", won a Monster's Ball match and defeated Jeff Jarrett for the NWA World Heavyweight Championship at Bound for Glory in 2005.

The first installment of the Bound for Glory chronology took place on October 23, 2005, at the TNA Impact! Zone in Orlando, Florida, where the event featured ten professional wrestling matches. Before the event began TNA aired a thirty-minute pre-show with Sonjay Dutt defeating Alex Shelley, Austin Aries, and Roderick Strong in a match involving four participants. Approximately 900 people were in attendance for the event, which was the maximum capacity of the Impact! Zone at that time. All three of TNA's active championships at the time were defended at the event. The event was dedicated to Reginald "The Crusher" Lisowski, who had died the night before. The main event on the card was Jeff Jarrett defending the NWA World Heavyweight Championship against Rhino with Tito Ortiz as the Special Guest Referee, which Rhino won. The TNA X Division Championship was also defended by A.J. Styles in a thirty-minute Iron Man match against Christopher Daniels, in which Styles retained the title. There were several matches featured on the event's undercard: including a Monster's Ball match resulting in a victory for Rhino over Jeff Hardy, Sabu, and Abyss, who was accompanied by James Mitchell; an Ultimate X match to become the number one contender to the TNA X Division Championship where Petey Williams defeated Chris Sabin and Matt Bentley; and an encounter resulting in Samoa Joe defeating Jushin Thunder Liger.

==== Reception ====
Bound for Glory 2005 met with generally positive reviews. Bob Kapur of the Slam Sports section of the Canadian Online Explorer rated the event a 9 out of 10. Kapur commented on the overall event stating that it "was one of the best PPVs in recent memory, and has to be a strong contender for Card of the Year honours." He later stated that TNA "definitely lived up to its name, delivering Total Nonstop Action from top to bottom" with a "well-executed mixture of excellent storytelling in the Iron Man match, high-flying excitement in the Ultimate X match, and brutal hardcore violence in the Monsters Ball, this show is definitely one that has to be seen, either on the replay or on the DVD when it becomes available." James Caldwell, a PWTorch columnist, had different feelings toward the event, stating that the finish to the main event was "fitting, a bad close to a bad PPV." Wade Keller, another PWTorch columnist, rated the Iron Man match 4 stars out of 5, while he rated the main event 1 star, which were his highest and lowest ratings during his review of the event. He did not give an overall event rating. The event was released on DVD on January 31, 2006, by TNA Home Video.

=== 2006 ===
==== Production ====
In early June 2006 TNA updated their PPV and TV taping schedule. On this schedule, the second Bound for Glory event was slotted to take place on October 22, 2006, though no location for the event was announced. On July 16, 2006, at TNA's Victory Road PPV event, TNA commentators Mike Tenay and Don West introduced a video package which announced that the second Bound for Glory event would be held in Detroit, however, its actual location was the charter township of Plymouth, Michigan, at the Compuware Sports Arena, which is a suburb west of Detroit area. This announcement meant that this would be the first monthly PPV event hosted by TNA to be held outside of the Impact! Zone or Orlando, Florida, in general. Another Total Nonstop InterAction event was also planned for this event, which took place on October 21, 2006. Tickets for Bound for Glory 2006 went on sale August 5, 2006. A thirty-minute "Road to Glory" special aired on October 21, 2006, highlighting the main matches on the card. The song "Enemy" by the American heavy metal band Fozzy was used as the official theme of the show.

==== Event ====
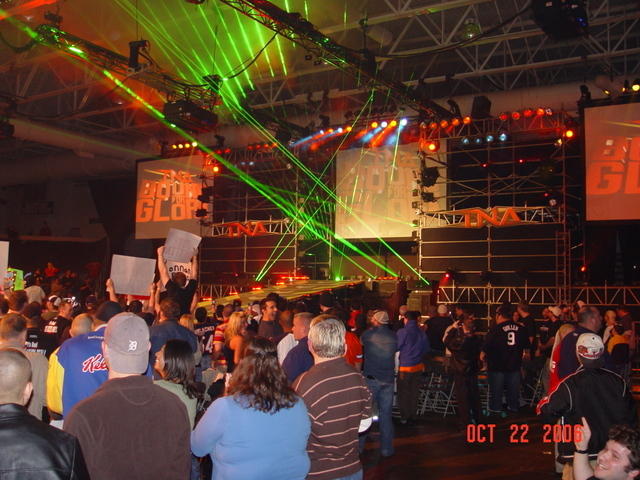
The 2006 set for Bound for Glory

Hailing from Plymouth, Michigan, at the Compuware Sports Arena on October 22, 2006, TNA held the second annual Bound for Glory event, where it featured eight professional wrestling matches. Like the previous year's incarnation, another 30-minute pre-show was featured before the event, with Bobby Roode, who was accompanied by Traci, defeating Lance Hoyt on the telecast. Approximately 3,600 people were in attendance for the event, which was 900 people less than the maximum capacity of the Compuware Sports Arena. All three of TNA's active championships at the time were defended at the event. All three championships changed hands at the event, making this event the only time in TNA history that all have changed hands in one night. The main event on the card was Jeff Jarrett defending the NWA World Heavyweight Championship against Sting in a Title vs. Career match with Kurt Angle as the Special Outside Enforcer; Sting won the encounter to become the new champion. The TNA X Division Championship was also defended by Senshi against Chris Sabin, which Sabin won to win the title. The last championship match was a Six Sides of Steel cage match for the NWA World Tag Team Championship, in which A.J. Styles and Christopher Daniels lost the championship to Homicide and Hernandez of The Latin American Exchange; the ring was surrounded by a steel cage in this match. There were several matches featured on the event's undercard: an 8 Mile Street Fight resulting in a victory for Christian Cage over Rhino; and Samoa Joe defeating Brother Runt, Raven, and Abyss, who was accompanied by James Mitchell, in a Monster's Ball match with Jake Roberts as the Special Guest Referee.

==== Reception ====
Bound for Glory 2006 met with generally positive reviews. Chris Sokol of the Slam Sports section of the Canadian Online Explorer rated the event a 7 out of 10. Sokol commented on the overall event stating that it was full of "several surprises, a card full of good matches and crowd that was so hot it would've melted the Impact Zone." When it came to feelings on the bouts, James Caldwell said he felt that the main event match for the NWA World Heavyweight Championship was "slightly above-average for a Jarrett PPV title match." Caldwell also felt that the NWA World Tag Team Championship match was "just a notch below Sabin-Senshi for match of the night so far." Wade Keller rated the Tag Team Championship match 4 stars out of 5, the TNA X Division Championship match 3 and 3/4 stars, and the main event 2 and 1/2 stars. The event was released on DVD on January 30, 2007, by TNA Home Video.

=== 2007 ===
==== Production ====
The third installment of Bound for Glory was announced in early July 2007 via TNA's official website, with it being scheduled for October 14, 2007; no location for the event was announced. On July 26, 2007, TNA sent out text messages to subscribers of their "TNA Mobile" service announcing that Bound for Glory 2007 would be held in Atlanta at the Gwinnett Center, which is actually located in the Duluth suburb of Atlanta. This was later confirmed more publicly when they published a press release via their official website. Also mentioned during the press release was the confirmation of another Total Nonstop InterAction event slated for the weekend of the event. The date for Total Nonstop InterAction was later released in early August 2007, when the event was booked for October 13, 2007.

==== Event ====
On October 14, 2007, TNA held the third annual Bound for Glory event, which featured nine professional wrestling matches on the card, at the Gwinnett Center in Duluth, Georgia. This year's show did not feature a thirty-minute pre-show unlike previous events. The maximum capacity of the Gwinnett Center is 13,000, however only 4,000 were in attendance for the event. All three of TNA's active championships at the time were defended at the event, with a new championship being unveiled and the first champion being crowned at the event. Sting defeated Kurt Angle for the TNA World Heavyweight Championship in the main event. Samoa Joe defeated Christian Cage with Matt Morgan as Special Outside Enforcer in another featured contest. The first TNA Women's Knockout Champion was crowned in Gail Kim, who defeated ten other female wrestlers in a Gauntlet match. The TNA X Division and the TNA World Tag Team Championships were defended on the event's undercard. TNA X Division Champion Jay Lethal defeated Christopher Daniels to retain the championship, while A.J. Styles and Tomko defeated Ron Killings and Rasheed Lucius Creed, who were accompanied by Adam Jones—collectively known as Team Pacman—to win the TNA World Tag Team Championship. Like previous events, another Monster's Ball match was also included on the card, with Abyss defeating Raven, Rhino, and Black Reign in the encounter.

==== Reception ====
The 2007 incarnation, like previous events, gained mainly positive reviews. Chris Sokol rated the event a 7.5 out of 10. In the early comments of his review, Sokol stated that he felt "TNA made it clear that their flagship event is their annual Bound For Glory extravaganza." The highest rated matches by Sokol was the TNA World Heavyweight Championship match and the bout pitting Samoa Joe against Christian Cage, which were both rated 8 out of 10. A Fight for the Right Reverse Battle Royal, which was also included on the card, and the Gauntlet match to crown the first TNA Women's World Champion were the lowest rated matches at 5 out of 10. James Caldwell's highest rating was given to Samoa Joe versus Christian Cage at 3 and a half stars out of 5. His lowest was given to the Fight for the Right Reverse Battle Royal, which was marked at half a star. Wade Keller commented on the overall event in his review stating it was "a good show". He went on to proclaim that it was "far from perfect, but enough really good action to be worth it for TNA fans who were on the fringe." The event was released on DVD on December 11, 2007, by TNA Home Video.

=== 2008 ===
==== Production ====
On the first day of 2008, TNA updated their official website to publicize the official dates for all of their PPV events to take place later that year. The next installment in the Bound for Glory chronology was listed as being scheduled for October 12, 2008. The location for the show was revealed via a press release on June 9, 2008 that the Sears Centre located in Hoffman Estates, a suburb of Chicago, was where it would be hailing from. The press release also announced that a Total Nonstop InterAction event was set to take place on October 11, that tickets for the event would go on sale August 1, 2008, and that the official title of the event was "Bound for Glory IV", meaning this was the first Bound for Glory event to feature Roman numerals in its title. The song "Tarantula" by the alternative rock band The Smashing Pumpkins was used as the official theme song of the show.

==== Event ====
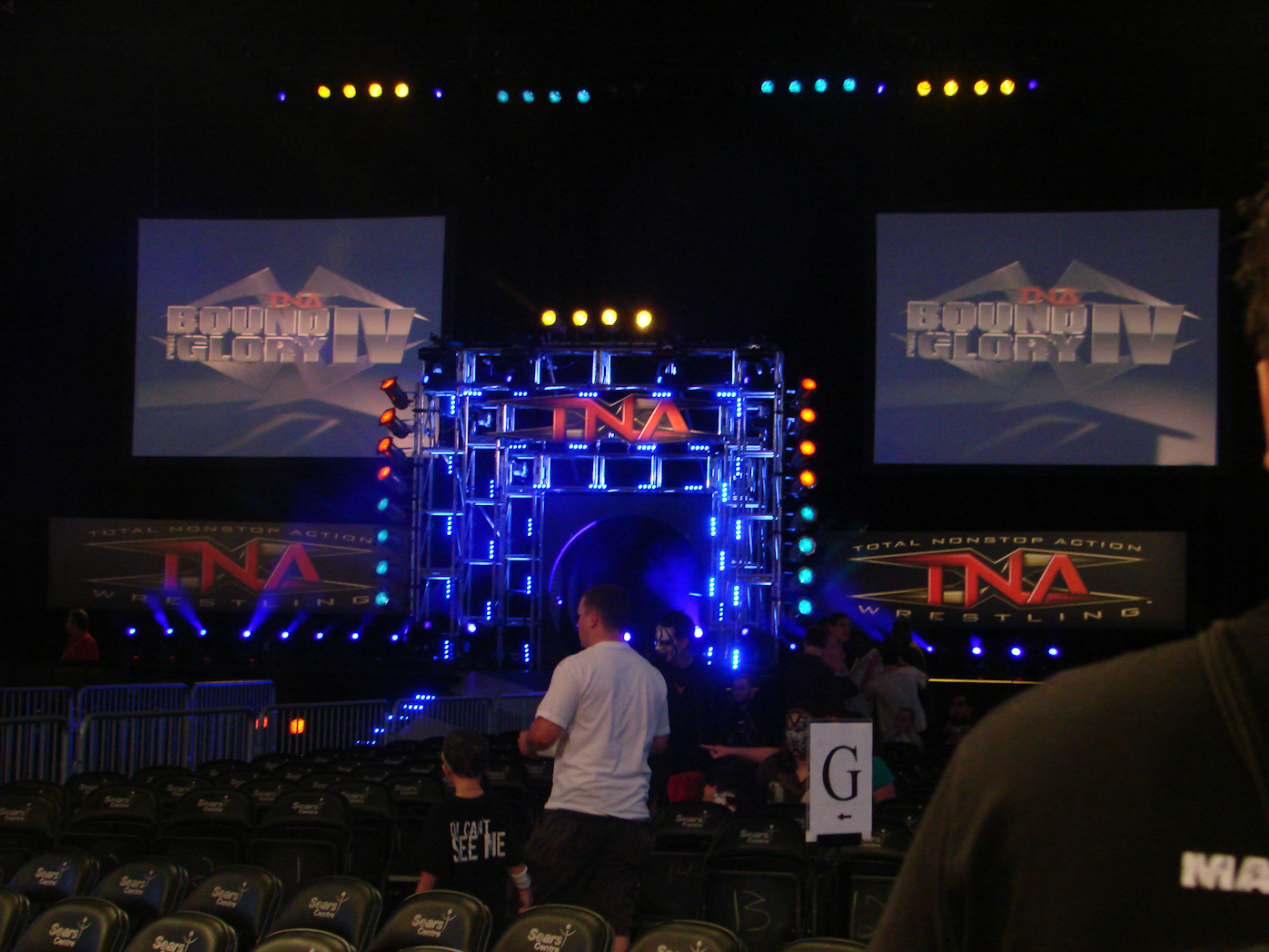
The set used for Bound for Glory IV

Bound for Glory IV took place on October 12, 2008, at the Sears Centre in Hoffman Estates, Illinois, where it featured eight professional wrestling matches. The maximum capacity of the Sears Centre is about 11,800; however, only 5,000 were in attendance for the event. All four of TNA's active championships at the time were defended at the event. The main event featured Sting defeating TNA World Heavyweight Champion Samoa Joe to become the new champion. Another featured match was Jeff Jarrett versus Kurt Angle with Mick Foley as the Special Guest Enforcer, which Jarrett won. Other matches on the card included a Four-Way Tag Team Monster's Ball match for the TNA World Tag Team Championship with Steve McMichael as the Special Guest Referee, which was won by Beer Money, Inc. (Robert Roode and James Storm), who were accompanied by Jacqueline, over the teams of Abyss and Matt Morgan, Brother Ray and Brother Devon—known as Team 3D—and The Latin American Xchange (Homicide and Hernandez); a match involving three competitors, also known as a 3-Way Dance or a Three Way match, resulting in Booker T defeating Christian Cage and A.J. Styles; and Sheik Abdul Bashir defeating Consequences Creed to retain the TNA X Division Championship.

==== Reception ====
Chris and Bryan Sokol of the Slam Sports section of the Canadian Online Explorer rated the event a 7 out of 10. They felt the overall event was a "decent PeePeeVee." The highest rated matches by both was the bout between Kurt Angle and Jeff Jarrett and the Monster's Ball match, which were both give an 8 out of 10. A Six Person Intergender Tag Team match and a Three Way match for the TNA Women's World Championship, now named the TNA Women's Knockout Championship, were both rated a 5 out of 10. James Caldwell's highest rating was given to Angle versus Jarrett at 4 stars out of 5. The Six Person Intergender Tag Team match was given the lowest at 1 star. Wade Keller commented on the main event match in his review stating it was "another fine match that fit its slot on the PPV well." The event was released on DVD on January 6, 2009, by TNA Home Video.

=== 2009 ===
==== Production ====
The fifth installment of the Bound for Glory chronology was first announced in late 2008, when TNA released their PPV event schedule for February through October 2009. On the list, Bound for Glory was scheduled to take place on October 18, 2009. The location for Bound for Glory was first announced during a promotional video package which aired during TNA's Slammiversary PPV event on June 21, 2009, stating that it would be held in Los Angeles. Later that evening, TNA issued their first public written statement regarding the event via a press release announcing that Bound for Glory would be held at the Bren Events Center located on the University of California, Irvine campus contradicting their earlier promotional video package proclaiming it would be held in Los Angeles. Tickets for the event went on sale August 1, 2009. On August 23, 2009, TNA published an article on their official site giving a first look at the Bound for Glory 2009 poster, which featured Sting, an updated Bound for Glory logo, advertising for the event, and the tagline "The Final Curtain?". In August 2009, the official site for the fifth incarnation was opened at BoundforGlory5.com; "Crawl Back In", a single by the rock band Dead by Sunrise to be featured on their debut album Out of Ashes, was announced as the official theme song of the event on the site.

==== Reception ====
Greg Parks reported on the first half of the show and James Caldwell reported the second half. Caldwell's highest rating was given to Angle versus Morgan at 4 out of 5 stars. His lowest actual rating was given to the Knockouts Championship match at 1 and a half stars while the Extreme Monster's Ball match was simply rated a "DUD."

=== 2010 ===
==== Production ====
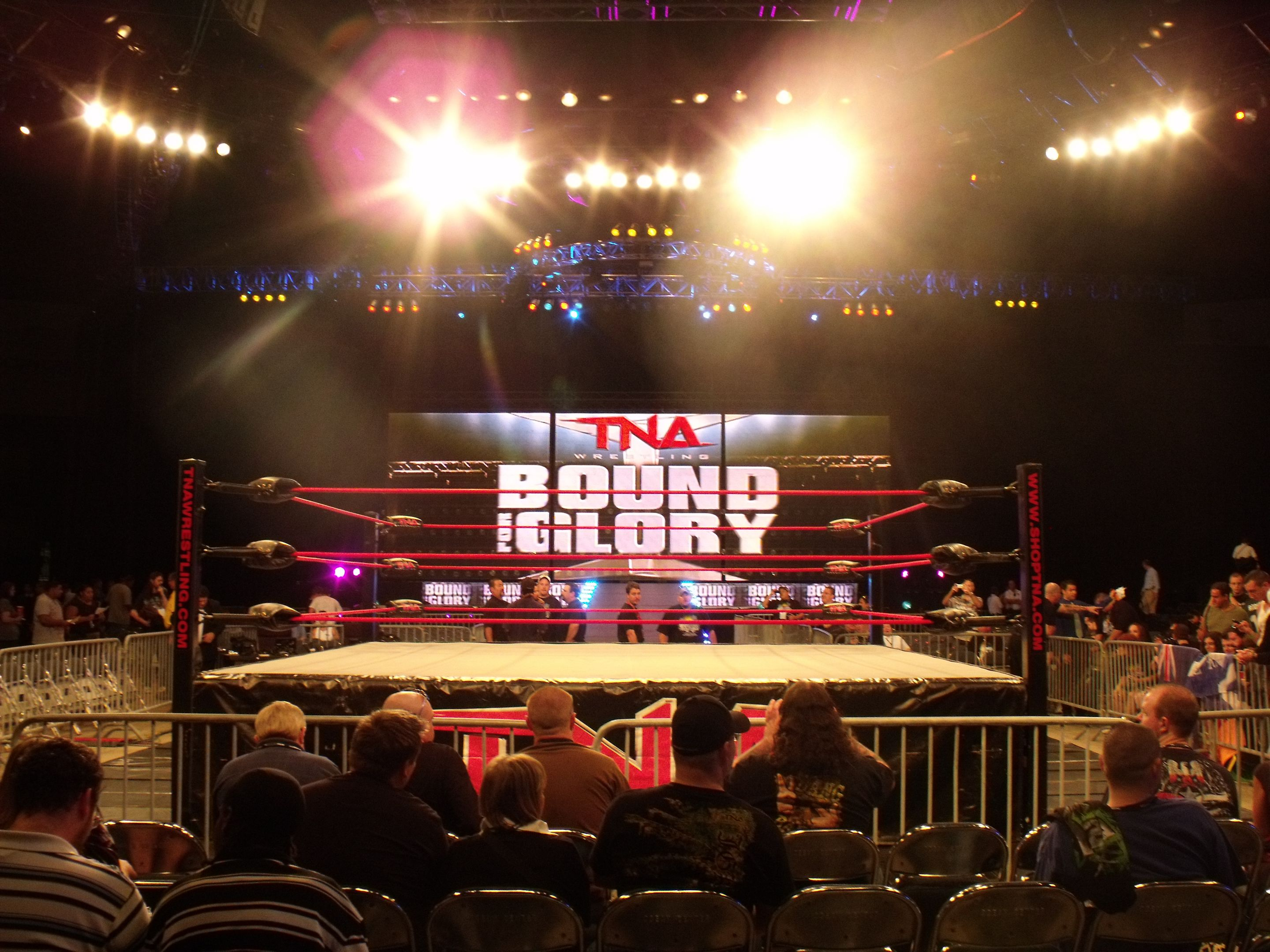
The set used for Bound for Glory 2010

The sixth annual Bound for Glory PPV spectacle was announced in a press release on June 25, 2010, where it was determined that the event would take place at the Ocean Center in Daytona Beach, Florida. In the press TNA President Dixie Carter stated that, "So many people come to 'Bound For Glory' from around the world", and added, "We wanted a locale that would truly be a destination. With our biggest pay-per-view of the year and all the fan experiences we have planned, it will make '10.10.10' an unforgettable weekend". Tickets for the event went on sale on August 7, 2010. To celebrate the making of the event, a "Bound for Glory Block Party" was held on the same day at the Ocean Center and garnered a good turnout despite weather conditions. It featured fan interaction and an exclusive match.

In October, the final Impact! episode the week leading to Bound for Glory was themed "Before the Glory", a special live broadcast hyping the event. TNA also organized "Bound for Glory VIP Weekend", a series of fan interaction sessions over the event weekend, which allowed fans to get close and personal with their favorite stars for opportunities such as pictures, autographs and special interviews.

==== Reception ====
Bound for Glory was received with mixed reviews. Canadian Online Explorer pro wrestling section writer Matt Bishop graded the event a 7 out of 10, the same as last year's event. He stated, "TNA's biggest show of the year, Bound For Glory, was a mix of good and bad. The show's biggest matches delivered on a show that featured a weak undercard". He also gave the main event 8 out of 10, and the Lethal Lockdown match 7 out of 10. His lowest scores were for the Knockouts Title match that was given a 2 out of 10 and the Young-Jordan versus Neal-Moore match that was rated a dud.

Phil Allely, a pro wrestling section writer for The Sun commented about the main event saying, "The finish was a shock for many reasons as, after the many near falls, moonsaults, finishing moves and obligatory ref bump, the title went to the unpredictable Hardy" and added, "The fans were obviously stunned as Hardy went on to deck his "friend" RVD and join Hogan, Bischoff, Abyss and Jarrett, subsequently revealing them to be the mysterious "They" as the PPV went off the air". About the pre-main event Lethal Lockdown match, Allely said, "Lethal Lockdown was everything it should be, a full-throttle cage match where all hell breaks loose and the opposing teams finally get the chance to work through their differences with the cage and weapons as added extras". Overall he commented, "Bound for Glory was perhaps TNA's best offering of 2010".

=== 2011 ===
==== Production ====
It was announced on July 13, 2011, that the location for this year's annual Bound for Glory would be revealed the following day on ESPN.com on Page 2. The next day, Sting, in his interview with ESPN SportsCenter anchor Robert Flores, declared that the event would be held in Philadelphia at the Liacouras Center on October 16, 2011. Tickets sales for the event went on sale on July 22, 2011.

On September 18, 2011, a new series called The Bound for Glory Chronicles debuted on TNA's website. The show featured exclusive interviews with wrestlers talking about their memories from previous Bound for Glory events. The wrestlers featured included Jeff Jarrett and Matt Morgan.

For the PPV, TNA also organized their annual Bound for Glory VIP Weekend, which included events such as Fan InterAction held at the Philadelphia Airport Marriott on the eve of Bound for Glory. This was a series of fan interaction sessions, which allowed fans to get close and personal with their favorite stars for opportunities such as pictures, autographs and special interviews. Other events included the "Night Before the Glory" Dinner Party, which featured more interaction between the fans and wrestlers after the Fan InterAction.

==== Reception ====
Bound for Glory was met with mixed to positive reviews. Canadian Online Explorer writer of the SLAM! Sports section, Matt Bishop, graded the entire event a 7.5 out of 10, which was essentially higher than the previous year's 7 out of 10. Bishop felt that the company delivered its best show in recent memory that was marred by a "horrendous finish in the main event", but went on to call the action, "outstanding". The highest rated match was given to the Angle-Roode main event match which received 7.5 out of 10. For other top rated matches, Anderson-Bully Ray received a 7 out of 10, Rob Van Dam-Jerry Lynn got 7 out of 10, and Austin Aries-Brian Kendrick got 7 out of 10. The lowest rated match was the Velvet Sky-Winter-Madison Rayne-Mickie James that was given 3 out of 10.

411 Mania writer of the wrestling section, Colin Rinehart, rated the event an 8.5 out of 10, praising the show as "far and away TNA's best PPV of the year so far" and "probably the most consistently entertaining Bound for Glory yet in company history", giving it an "Easy and enthusiastic Thumbs Up." The top two highest rated bouts were given to Van Dam-Lynn that got 3 and 3/4 out of 5 stars and the Angle-Roode main event got 3 and a 1/2 out of 5 stars. The lowest went to Velvet Sky-Winter-Madison Rayne-Mickie James at 1 and a 1/4 stars.

=== 2012 ===
==== Production ====
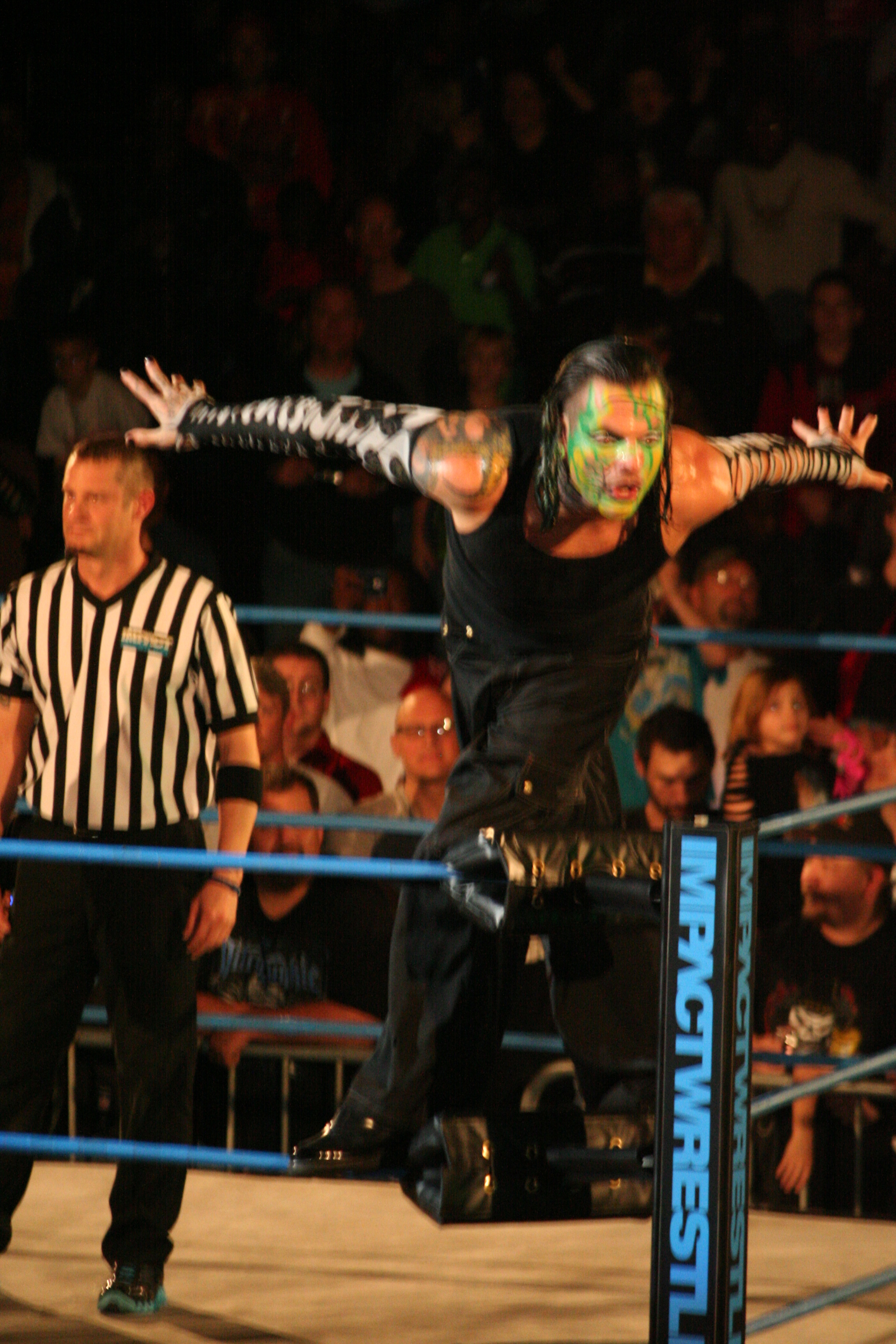
Jeff Hardy, winner of the 2012 Bound for Glory Series

The eighth event in the Bound for Glory chronology was first announced on June 10, 2012, at the Slammiversary PPV to around the weekend where Sting would be formally inducted into the TNA Hall of Fame. Late June, TNA President Dixie Carter stated via Twitter that Bound for Glory would take place in a city not yet visited by the company and be revealed during the telecast of the July 5 edition of Impact Wrestling. During the show, an official video announcement confirmed the event would transpire at the Grand Canyon University Arena in Phoenix, Arizona on October 14, 2012. Before the tickets went on sale on July 27, 2012, Rob Van Dam promoted the event and signed autographs during a pre-sale session at the GCU Arena Box Office the day prior.

TNA hyped up their flagship PPV further by producing a series of Road To Bound for Glory preview videos featuring several wrestlers speaking highly of the event. After issuing a press release a month prior, TNA's programming home Spike aired Countdown to Bound for Glory, a 1-hour special preview an hour before the PPV.

To celebrate the event, TNA arranged travel packages and organized festivities to take place the weekend prior to the show. On October 13, 2012, the Bound for Glory VIP Weekend hosted events such as the Inaugural Hall of Fame Induction Celebration for Sting that was held at the Pointe Hilton Tapatio Cliffs Resort, and on that same day, the annual Bound for Glory Fan InterAction gave fans a chance to get close with their favorite stars for conversations, autographs, and photographs.

=== 2013 ===
==== Production ====
The ninth event in the Bound for Glory chronology was first announced on June 2, 2013, at the Slammiversary PPV to around the weekend where Kurt Angle would be formally inducted into the TNA Hall of Fame. In late May, the official press release for the event was sent out, in which TNA President Dixie Carter stated, "I'm really looking forward to bringing our biggest Pay-Per-View event of the year to San Diego for the first TNA show ever in this great city", adding that "Since 2005, Bound for Glory has brought fans from across the world together to enjoy a jam-packed weekend of fun and intense competition, and I'm thrilled that we will have the sunny Southern California coast as our backdrop. Tickets for the event went on sale June 7, 2013.

In September, TNA announced their deal with Spike TV to air their 1-hour Countdown to Bound for Glory pre-show prior to the official PPV. Media attention for Bound for Glory was also garnered from an array of sources, including The Miami Herald, Direct TV and Marvel. As part of the yearly attraction, TNA put together the Bound for Glory VIP Weekend around the San Diego area, featuring various festivities such as the Fan InterAction that gives fans the opportunity to connect with their favorite stars, and the TNA Hall of Fame ceremony for Kurt Angle at the San Diego Marriott Mission Valley leading up to the day of the event. The event's theme song "Every Other Day" was created by Jeff Hardy's band Peroxwhy?gen, from their new album, Plurality Of Worlds, set to release on November 29. The second theme song is "Big Shot" by Islander.

==== Reception ====
Mike Johnson, from PWInsider, said that the main event was "Really good, hard hitting, well told story here. Easily the best thing on the show and a really good main event." However, he criticized the Magnus-Sting due to "The idea here was to make Magnus by having Sting lose clean in a back and forth contest. On paper, it made sense but the match didn't feel like it had the spark needed for that sort of moment". Also, described Ethan's debut as "pitch-perfect". He described the entire show as "It was just a show – some good, some eh, but Bound for Glory should never be just a show, it's their Wrestlemania, except this year, it wasn't. Pat McNeill, from PWTorch, said Bound for Glory "Wasn't a great event". Bob Kapur, from CANOE Slam, said that he enjoyed the event overall. Also, Matthew Asher, from CANOE too, enjoyed the PPV but said the ultimate success of this Bound for Glory rests on the future storylines this event sets up.

=== 2014 ===
On June 25 before TNA Impact Wrestling tapings in New York City, TNA President Dixie Carter along with Wrestle-1 founder/owner and Japanese wrestling legend The Great Muta held a press conference at the Manhattan Center to announce that the annual Bound for Glory pay-per-view would take place in Tokyo, Japan, at Korakuen Hall.

== See also ==
- WrestleMania: the premier event produced by WWE
- All In: the premier event produced by All Elite Wrestling
- Wrestle Kingdom: the premier event produced by New Japan Pro-Wrestling
- Triplemanía: the premier event produced by Lucha Libre AAA Worldwide
- Starrcade: the premier event produced by the defunct World Championship Wrestling
- November to Remember: the premier event produced by the defunct Extreme Championship Wrestling
