= Joseph Michael =

American singer

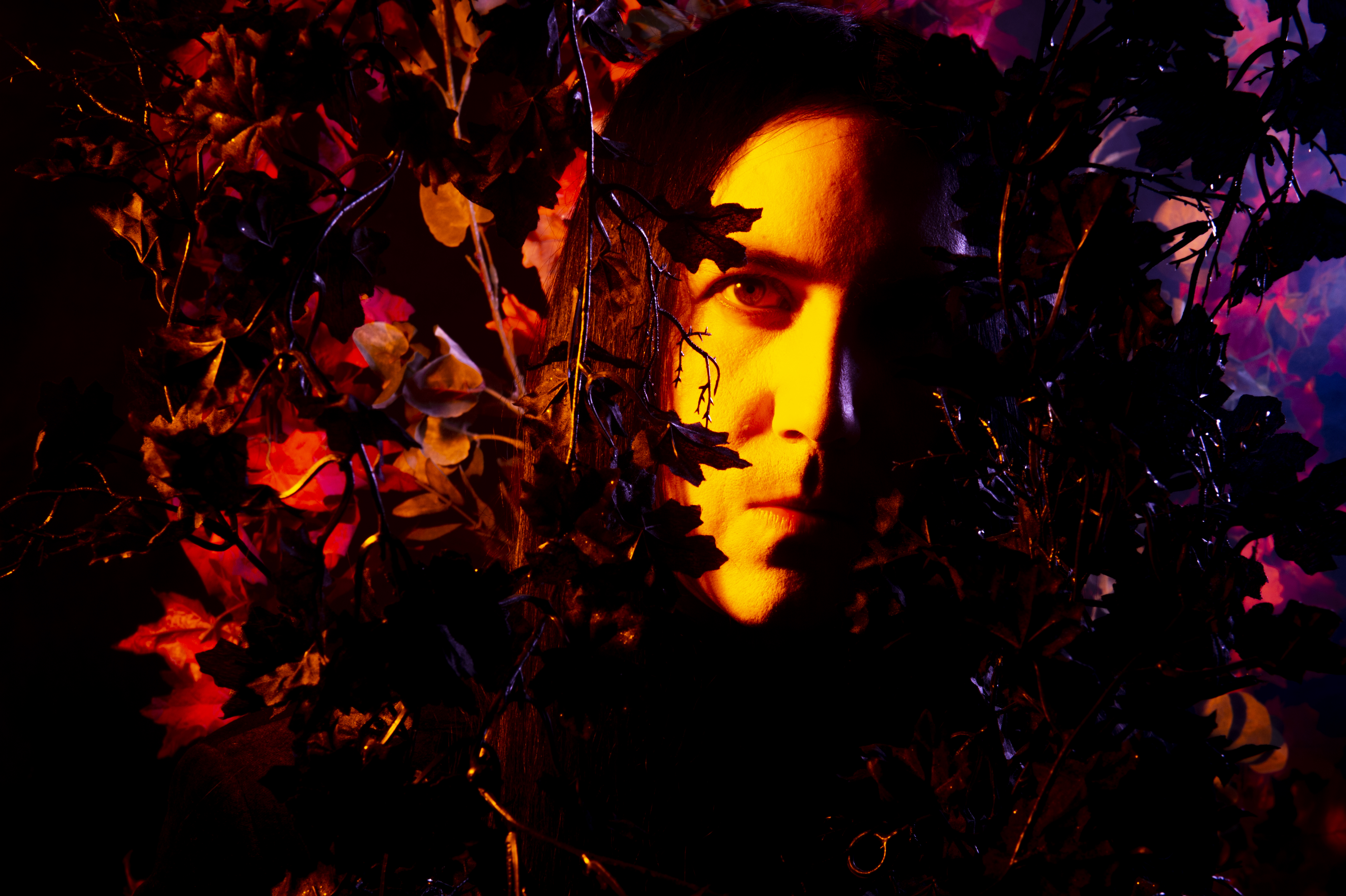

Background information
- Born: Joseph Michael Furney; Utica, New York, U.S.
- Occupations: Singer, songwriter
- Years active: 1995–present
- Labels: Sony Music Japan; Century Media; Hollywood Rx Records
- Website: josephmichaelofficial.com

Joseph Michael is an American singer. He is best known as the lead singer and songwriter of the band Witherfall, and for being the lead singer of Sanctuary. He is also a former member of White Wizzard, Midnight Reign and Peppermint Creeps.

== Early life and career ==
Joseph Michael was born in Utica, New York, on December 26, 1979. Michael dropped out of school at the age of 15, and earned a living teaching music. At the age of 19, he bought a one-way bus ticket from Utica to Los Angeles, where he hoped to make a career in music. He took various jobs, and played in several cover bands before founding his own band, Midnight Reign.

== Musical career ==
=== Midnight Reign: 1995–present ===
Michael founded the metal band Midnight Reign in 1995, with drummer Adam Gust, celloist Starla Baker, and violinist Alma Cielo. The band's debut album Never Look Back was released in 2007 on Hollywood Rx Records. Michael recorded vocals, guitar, bass and keyboards for the album.

=== Peppermint Creeps: 1998–2008 ===
While in Los Angeles, Michael met Traci Michaelz of the glam metal band Peppermint Creeps. Michael was the bassist and backup vocalist of Peppermint Creeps from 1998 until 2008.

=== White Wizzard: 2012–2013 ===
Michael joined White Wizzard in 2012, and recorded vocals on their 2013 album The Devil's Cut. He left the band in October 2013 following a disagreement with founder Jon Leon, who was allegedly skimming profits from the band. Shortly after Michael's exit, White Wizzard members Will Wallner and Jake Dreyer announced their departures from the band.

=== Witherfall: 2013–present ===
In 2013, Michael founded progressive metal band Witherfall with guitarist Jake Dreyer, his former bandmate from White Wizzard, drummer Adam Sagan, and bassist Anthony Crawford In 2017, the band released their debut album Nocturnes and Requiems, followed by A Prelude to Sorrow (2018), which peaked at #18 on the Top Heatseekers Chart. They released the acoustic EP Vintage in 2019.

Witherfall released their third album, Curse of Autumn in 2021. The album peaked at #83 in the United States, #20 in Germany, and #73 in Switzerland.

=== Sanctuary: 2017–present ===
Michael became the touring singer of Sanctuary after the death of lead vocalist Warrel Dane in December 2017. Michael toured with them in 2018, as part of a farewell tour to pay tribute to Dane. In May 2019, the band announced that they were continuing with Michael as their lead singer, and were working on a new full-length album titled Transmutation. At the same time, Sanctuary confirmed that they would be embarking on further European and North American tours that year.

=== Other work ===
Michael co-wrote "LMFAO" by Dez Cleo which was featured on the soundtrack of the 2013 horror-comedy film Fright Night 2: New Blood. In 2019, he recorded a cover of Savatage's "Chance" along with Van Williams, Anthony Crawford, Joey Concepcion, Alex Nasla, and Will Wallner.

Michael recorded lead vocals for the band Omery Rising, and was featured on the 2014 single "Lady Snow", and their debut album The Rising (2015). He was also the vocalist for Omicida, recording their debut album Certain Death.

== Artistry ==
Michael is known for his operatic heavy metal singing style, and wide vocal range. His voice has been favorably compared with singers Bruce Dickinson, Daniel Gildenlöw and Ronnie James Dio. In an interview with Decibel, he cited artists like Dream Theater, Type O Negative, King Diamond and Guns N' Roses as influences on his singing style.

== Personal life ==
Joseph Michael is the cousin of Ronnie James Dio. In an interview with Rock Hard, he mentioned that he had never met Dio, but that he saw him as an influence growing up.

== Discography ==
=== Witherfall ===
- Sounds Of The Forgotten (2024)
- Curse of Autumn (2021)
- Vintage EP (2019)
- A Prelude to Sorrow (2018)
- Nocturnes and Requiems (2017)

=== Sanctuary ===
- Transmutation (TBA)

=== Omery Rising ===
- The Rising (2015)

=== Omicida ===
- Certain Death (2015)

=== White Wizzard ===
- The Devil's Cut (2013)

=== Midnight Reign ===
- Never Look Back (2007)
