= Jake Dreyer =

American guitarist (born 1992)

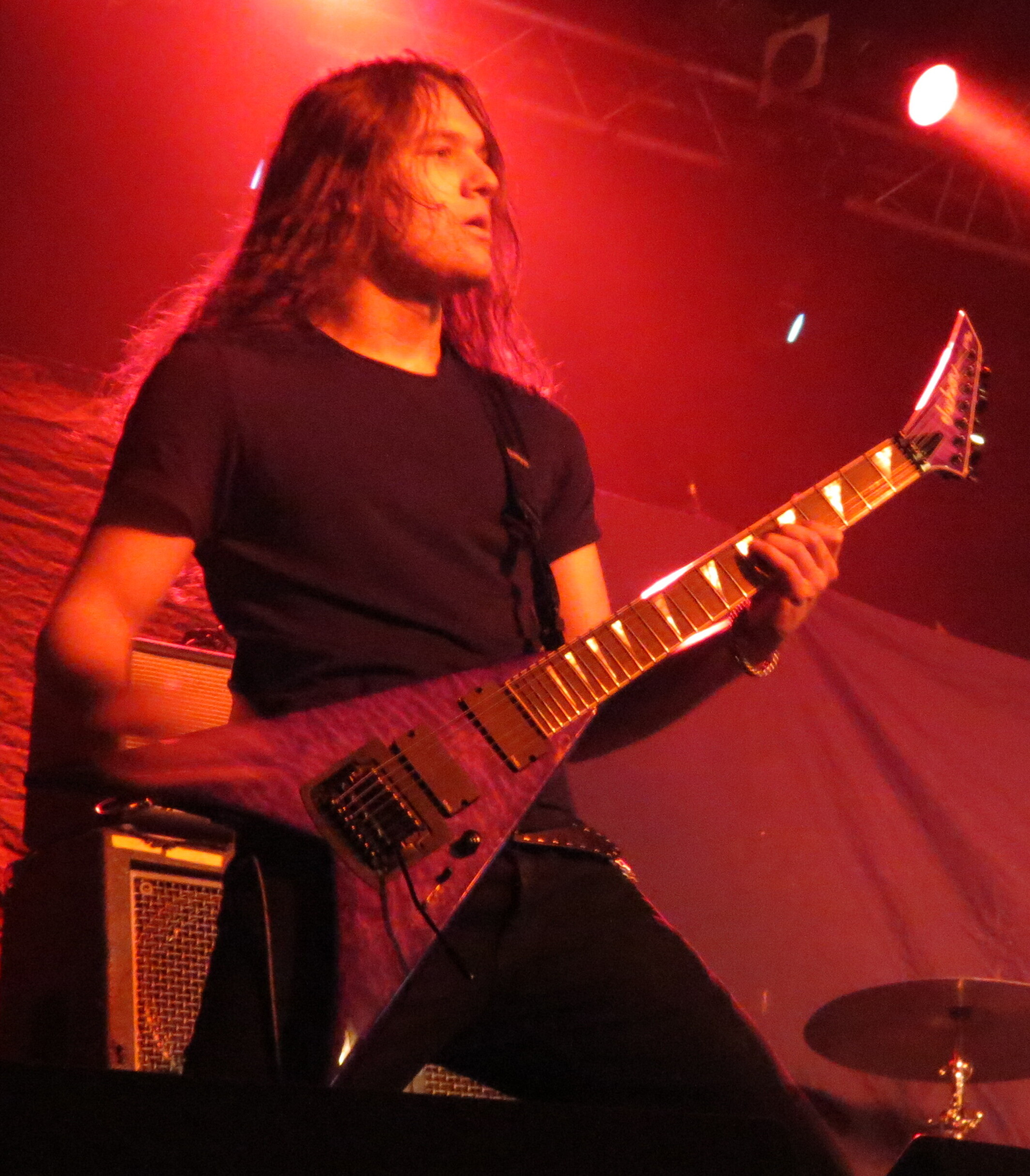
- Dreyer performing with White Wizzard in 2011

Background information
- Born: Jacob Daniel Dreyer; May 2, 1992 (age 33)
- Origin: Panama City Beach, Florida, U.S.
- Genres: Heavy metal
- Occupations: Musician, songwriter
- Instrument: Guitar
- Years active: 2005–present
- Member of: Witherfall
- Formerly of: White Wizzard, DeadRingers Guild, Iced Earth, Demons & Wizards, Kobra and the Lotus
- Website: jakedreyer.com

Jake Dreyer (born May 2, 1992) is an American musician who is the lead guitarist and songwriter for the progressive metal band Witherfall and former lead guitarist for Iced Earth. He was also a touring and session guitarist for the bands Demons & Wizards, White Wizzard, and Kobra and the Lotus.

== Early life ==
At the age of 6, Dreyer started playing guitar after he heard the AC/DC song "Hells Bells". "I instantly knew that I wanted to do that too. I was hooked," says Dreyer during a July 2011 interview with Noisecreep. "Like anyone else, my tastes broadened over the years. So once I started progressing in my playing, I looked for heavier bands like Megadeth and Testament. In high school, I discovered all of the Shrapnel Records guys, but Yngwie Malmsteen was the first guitarist I heard that really changed my life. There was something about his playing that just pulled me in," remembers Dreyer. Dreyer released four EPs and an album before graduating high school. During that time, he also studied under Chris Broderick (Megadeth, Jag Panzer, Nevermore) and David Shankle (Manowar), and won the 2007, 2008, and 2009 award for best guitarist of the year.

== Career ==
=== DeadRingers Guild (2007–2010) ===
Toward the end of 2007, Dreyer formed the melodic metal band DeadRingers Guild. During their 3 years together as a group, the band went on to release 2 professionally recorded EP's, 2008's DeadRingers Guild and 2010s DeadRingers Guild II and tour across the nation, sharing the stage with many national and international acts such as Paul Di'Anno (Ex-Iron Maiden), Enforcer, Cauldron, and Dark Castle. The former EP contained a single written by Dreyer called "War Path", which become a finalist in the Hard Rock/Metal category of the 2009 Independent Music Awards. The aforementioned award is often referred to as the "indie grammy". In September 2010, Dreyer left DeadRingers Guild to go out to Los Angeles to attend school at the Musicians Institute."Once that happened, the rest of the guys in the band just kind of did their own individual things. There is no bad blood between anybody in the band. I still talk to those guys all the time", Dreyer said in an August 2011 Metal Underground interview.

=== Jag Panzer (2011) ===
In July 2011, Dreyer was chosen to replace Christian Lasegue in the power metal band Jag Panzer (Century Media Records). Shortly after welcoming Dreyer into the group, Jag Panzer decided to disband. The unexpected breakup made news worldwide. Drummer Rikard Stjernquist said, "One player, 19-year-old Jake Dreyer, submitted videos of him nailing solos from both Chris Broderick and Christian Lasegue. We were ready to welcome Jake into the band, but, unfortunately, that will not happen. There is no doubt in any of our minds that Jake will go on to be a household name in his own right." Despite Christian Lasegue's replacement by the 19-year-old Dreyer, frontman Mark Briody stated,"the decision to split was not due to Lasegue's departure. It's what was best for the band as a collective and its individual members."

=== Deathriders (2011) ===
Shortly after Jag Panzer disbanded, Dreyer joined DeathRiders, a heavy metal band fronted by former Anthrax vocalist, Neil Turbin. The newly formed group soon started preparing for upcoming performances and the future "Stay Screaming" tour. When asked about DeathRiders new lineup, Giovanny Torres-Bass, Peter Vazquez-Drums, Mike Guerrero-Guiter, and Jake Dreyer-Guitar, Turbin stated, "This is the best group of guys I ever had the opportunity to work with! Right from the first time we played together there was an undeniable chemistry that I personally have been searching for, a powerful musical connection that I know the fans are going to feel as well. The musicianship is top-notch." DeathRiders performance was recorded live at the House of Blues in West Hollywood, California on August 23, 2011.

=== White Wizzard (2011–2013) ===
In September 2011, Dreyer became the new guitarist for the band White Wizzard. Within a month's time, he and the band set out on a nationwide tour as the opening act for Firewind on the "Frets of Fury" tour along with Arsis, and Nightrage. The tour was both well received and attended. Immediately thereafter, the band set out for Bochum, Germany to begin a two-month European tour as direct support for Iced Earth. Upon their arrival home, the band started writing new music. The first song from this collaboration,"Torpedo of Truth" was recorded in May 2012. When asked about the new music, the band posted, "It will feature, beastly rhythm, thunderous melodic bass and some serious shred at a whole new level. Soon thereafter, Dreyer and the band headed to Tokyo to play at Club Quattro for the band's first ever Japanese tour. On June 3, 2013, "The Devil's Cut" was released via Earache Records/Century Media featuring guitar solos by Dreyer.

=== Kobra and the Lotus (2014–2016) ===
In June 2014, Dreyer joined Kobra and the Lotus as a touring guitarist in support of the Kiss and Def Leppard 40th Anniversary Summer tour. The following two years with the band included various UK/European tours as well as the recording of the band's double album "Prevail I and II" (Napalm Records) with producer Jacob Hansen in Ribe, Denmark in early Spring 2016.

=== Demons & Wizards (2019–2021) ===
On May 28, 2019 it was revealed that Dreyer would be the lead guitarist for the band Demons & Wizards on their "A Magical Encounter with Demons & Wizards" tour beginning May 31 in Germany. Following Jon Schaffer's involvement in the 2021 storming of the United States Capitol, vocalist Hansi Kürsch disbanded the band on February 1, 2021.

=== Iced Earth (2016–2021) ===
On September 25, 2016, Dreyer was announced as the new lead guitarist of Iced Earth, replacing Troy Seele, who had left the band in August citing family commitments. Dreyer left the band on February 15, 2021 to focus on Witherfall following Jon Schaffer's involvement in the 2021 storming of the United States Capitol.

=== Witherfall (2013–present) ===
Witherfall is the collective brainchild of Dreyer, vocalist Joseph Michael and the late drummer Adam Sagan. With Dreyer and Michael having previously worked together in White Wizzard and Sagan collaborating with Dreyer on the critically acclaimed debut instrumental EP In the Shadows of Madness, the trio combined forces to begin writing the project in 2013. As of 2025, Witherfall has released four full-length records, all co-produced by Dreyer. The 2021 album Curse of Autumn debuted at No. 20 on the German charts. Witherfall has toured in Japan, Europe, Mexico and North America.

=== Solo (2010–present) ===
In August 2010, Dreyer recorded his first solo instrumental EP In the Shadows of Madness with respected producer JJ Crews of Boogie Tracks in Panama City, Florida. In April 2011, the EP was mastered by mastering pro Maor Appelbaum (Yngwie, Tony McAlpine, Rob Halford) and released a few weeks later. ITSM, which features Adam Sagan (Echoterra, Into Eternity) on drums and Noah Martin (Arsis) on bass guitar showcases Dreyer's many years of study under such masters as Chris Broderick (Megadeth, Jag Panzer, Nevermore), David Shankle (David Shankle Group, Manowar), and Rusty Cooley (Outworld). Positive reviews for ITSM appeared on websites all over the world. "When we first heard the music by guitar monster Jake Dreyer, our ears were immediately hooked to the sonic perfection that this very talented guitar shredder can accomplish note after note" "...Dreyer is ready to become the latest American guitar protégé with his first solo-dubbed album 'In the Shadows of Madness'." As a solo artist, Dreyer is sponsored by Bogner Amplification, EMG, Inc, Kahler tremolo, RockBand Network, and Jackson Guitars. He recorded a series of instructional videos for both Ultimate Guitar Archive and Reignlicks.com. which provided step by step instructions on playing featured "licks" of his original music. Dreyer's music has been played in rotation on stations such as Pandora Radio and Front Row Rock, as well as being in the top 10 airplay list for several weeks on Jango. In December 2011, ITSM was rated by Apoch's Metal as one of the top 20 EPs of 2011. In November 2011, the 2nd single Harmony of the Spheres was released on the Xbox 360 game, RockBand. In a December 2011 Metal Insider interview, Dreyer was asked,"what accomplishment/award are you most proud of?" He replied, "I would say that my favorite accomplishment so far has been this EP. Just due to the fact that I had such a great time writing and recording it and all the guys that were part of it JJ Crews, Adam Sagan and Noah Martin are all awesome dudes. I am pretty proud of the final product...”

=== Other ===
In late December 2011, Dreyer assisted Chris Broderick at the Skolnick/Broderick Winter Guitar Retreat in New York. In January 2012, he checked in with Jackson guitars.com to talk about his time with Broderick and the whole experience: “We got up on stage and jammed Jason Becker's "Perpetual Burn" on the last night. It was a great time!". In September 2011, Dreyer became a guest columnist for Guitar World.com: Getting Ready to Record: The Do’s and Don’ts (September 7, 2011) and the Do’s and Don’ts of Playing Live (February 13, 2012). He also took part in many artist interviews and stories.

== Equipment ==
- Jackson CS KV7 (Purple quilt top) with Dimarzio D-Activator's and a Kahler 2317 tremolo
- Jackson KV2 (Black Ghost Flame)
- Jackson SL7 (Natural Stained Black)
- Charvel Guthrie Govan Signature (Natural)
- Charvel San Dimas (Tobacco Burst)
- Charvel DK 24 (Matte Green)
- Amp:Bogner Ecstasy
- Head: Bogner Uber-Cab;
- Soldano SLO-100
- Kemper Profiler (live)

=== Rack/Effects ===
- Furman Power Conditioner
- Shure ULX S4 Wireless
- DigiTech TSR-12 (Reverb Only)
- Dunlop Rack Wah
- Korg DTR2000

== Discography ==
=== Witherfall ===
- Nocturnes and Requiems (2017)
- A Prelude to Sorrow (2018)
- Vintage (EP) (2019)
- The Other Side (EP) (2021)
- Curse of Autumn (2021)
- Sounds of the Forgotten (2024)

=== Iced Earth ===
- Incorruptible (2017)

=== Demons & Wizards ===
- III (2020)

=== Kobra and the Lotus ===
- Prevail I (2017)
- Prevail II (2018)

=== White Wizzard ===
- The Devil's Cut (2013)

=== Solo ===
- In the Shadows of Madness (EP) (2011)

=== DeadRingers Guild ===
- Demo 2008 (2008)
- DeadRingers Guild II (2010)

== Note ==
Dreyer and his musical work is registered with ASCAP.
