= Flying Tigers (album) =

Studio album by White Wizzard
- Released: September 19, 2011
- Recorded: 2011, in Phoenix, Arizona
- Genre: Heavy metal
- Length: 58:41
- Label: Earache Records
- Producer: Ralph Patlan

White Wizzard chronology
Over the Top (2010)	Flying Tigers (2011)	The Devil's Cut (2013)

Flying Tigers is the second studio album by heavy metal band White Wizzard, released on September 19, 2011 in Europe and in North America on November 15. Until 2018's Infernal Overdrive, it was the last album to feature Wyatt Anderson on vocals, being released after his departure from the band in June 2011.

While the first half of the album features simple and straightforward songwriting similar to the band's previous album, Over the Top, the last six songs are more progressive in structure and form a single story concept.

== Track listing ==
Professional ratings
Review scores
Source	Rating
Hellbound	8.5/10 stars
Metal-Temple	9/10 stars
Metal Kaoz	7/10 stars
Lords of Metal	(90/100)

No.	Title	Length
1.	"Fight to the Death"	4:53
2.	"West L.A. Nights"	4:38
3.	"Starchild"	5:23
4.	"Flying Tigers"	5:08
5.	"Night Train to Tokyo"	5:01
6.	"Night Stalker"	3:55
7.	"Fall of Atlantis"	5:08
8.	"Blood on the Pyramids"	2:57
9.	"Demons and Diamonds"	9:13
10.	"Dark Alien Overture"	2:12
11.	"War of the Worlds"	4:03
12.	"Starman's Son"	6:37
Total length:		58:41

== Personnel ==
- Wyatt "The Screamin' Demon" Anderson - Vocals
- Jon Leon - Guitar/Bass
- Giovanni Durst - Drums
