= Charlie Parra del Riego =

Peruvian guitarist and composer (born 1985)

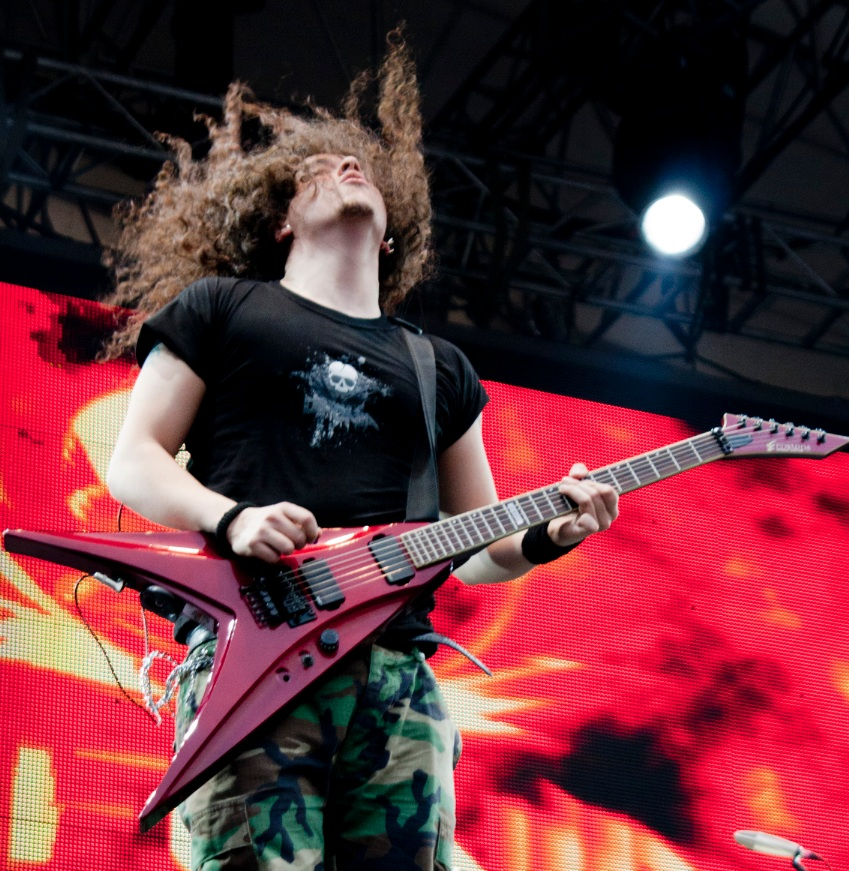
- Charlie Parra performing in 2016

Background information
- Born: Carlos Enrique Parra del Riego Campoverde; 5 March 1985 (age 41); Lima, Peru
- Genres: Power metal; alternative rock; hard rock; heavy metal; thrash metal; groove metal; punk
- Occupation: Musician
- Instrument: Guitar
- Years active: 2000–present
- Formerly of: Difonía; Serial Asesino; M.A.S.A.C.R.E
- Website: charlieparradelriego.com

Carlos Enrique Parra del Riego Campoverde (born 5 March 1985), also known as Charlie Parra, is a Peruvian guitarist and composer.

== Early life ==
Born in Lima, Peru, Parra was thirteen years old when he started to learn his first instrument, which was a Peruvian Cajón. Spending a lot of his childhood playing games and not being a great student, his parents were told by a school therapist that he ought to learn an instrument in order to focus his energy on something. This led to Parra picking up the guitar.

== Style and influences ==
Parra has been influenced by Slash, Eddie Van Halen, Randy Rhoads, Marty Friedman, Kirk Hammett, Robbin Crosby, Dino Cazares, Dimebag Darrell, and Johnny Ramone.

== Bands ==
=== Difonía ===
Parra started Difonía with a few friends (Ricardo Mendez, Sergio Guerra and Nachi Benza) in year 2003 as a hardcore punk act with heavy metal influences. With this band he composed and recorded the guitars of their 3 albums: "Camino Difícil" (2004), "Tarde o Temprano" (2007) and "Génesis" (2010). As a member of Difonía, Parra took part of several festivals in the independent rock circuit of Perú and shared stage with international bands as "Silverstein", "Alesana" and "Tres de Corazón".

In 2009, Difonía played the Banda Ancha de Medellín festival Colombia.

In 2010, they played in the Colombian festival Altavoz Festival 2010 at Medellín, together with "The Skatalites", "Robi Draco Rosa", "Dante Spinetta", "Reincidentes" and the Philharmonic Orchestra of Medellín. There was an audience of about 25,000 people.

In 2012, Parra quit Difonía due musical differences and to pursue a solo career. Difonía eventually disbanded and Parra left Peru to join Canadians Kobra and the Lotus. After leaving Kobra and the Lotus, Parra reformed Difonía in 2015.

=== Serial Asesino ===
Parra was a member of the nu metal band Serial Asesino from 2005 until 2009.

=== M.A.S.A.C.R.E. ===
In 2009, Parra was recruited to be a part of the band as a replacement of their lead guitar Jaqo Sangalli. This was a great honour to Parra, since he was a huge fan of the band. With M.A.S.A.C.R.E, in 2009, he opened the concerts of the Argentinian bands "Los Violadores" and "Rata Blanca" in Lima, Peru. Parra left M.A.S.A.C.R.E in 2012 to join Canadian band Kobra and the Lotus. His last concert was at the first Lima Live Rock, in front of more than 20,000 attendees.

=== Solo career ===
In 2010, Parra started his solo career uploading a first series of videos in his YouTube channel, including a heavy metal version of Peru's National Anthem, the first version of this song in heavy metal style. This version was covered in TV, radio and local newspapers.

In January 2011, he released his first solo album, Procrastinación/Procrastination, together with another series of YouTube videos that led his channel to one of the most viewed of the year. His singles "Speed F*cks" and "Punk vs Metal" have been covered by several guitar players around the world. In 2011, Parra wrote music for the UK commentator TotalBiscuit, Call of Duty figure Sandy Ravage and Swiss game commentator Diablox9.

After the breakup of Difonía, Parra continued on with Oliver and Jeremy Castillo and performed some shows playing tracks from the album "Procrastination / Procrastination".

Parra has continued his solo career even after joining Kobra and the Lotus. His latest album is a collaboration with Oliver and Jeremy Castillo and is called "Organic I". It was released on 17 November 2013. In January 2014, Parra traveled to France to record guitars for French project "The Lost Rockers".

In 2015, Parra became the first South American artist to have a signature guitar by Kramer Guitars USA and the Gibson corporation, leading this to a NAMM performance on January. Back in Lima, his band featuring the Castillo brothers supported Slash during his South American leg of the tour and this performance became the live Blu-ray Charlie en el Parque 2015. Parra performed as a solo artist in the Hellfire Tavern, at Hellfest 2015 in Nantes, France.

In February 2016, Parra performed with the Bicentenario Symphonic Orchestra at Gran Teatro Nacional. It was a sold-out concert. Parra also toured in Germany and Mexico to perform as a solo artist in World of Warcraft expansions release parties and at the Overwatch release. He also worked on the music for a Duke Nukem release trailer.

=== Kobra and the Lotus ===
In 2012, Parra announced he was not playing with Difonía anymore to focus on his next solo release, but instead joined the Canadian heavy metal band Kobra and the Lotus in the beginning of their European tour with Steel Panther, playing in Finland, Germany, Switzerland and Belgium. After that, they toured United Kingdom supporting Buckcherry and Sonata Arctica in United States. In 2013, Parra joined Kobra and the Lotus again, this time supporting Fear Factory and Amaranthe for most of the year. After the touring season, he recorded guitars for the band's following album "High Priestess", to be released in 2014. The album was produced by Johnny K. In 2014, weeks prior to the release of Kobra and the Lotus third release and a new tour supporting Kiss, Parra was unable to join the band due to visa issues related to a pretour in Europe and was replaced by Jake Dreyer for the Kiss tour and subsequently left the group citing management and visa issues in a recent interview. The group lists Parra as a special guest on their album "High Priestess".

== Discography ==
=== Difonía ===
- Camino Difícil – EP (2003)
- Tarde o Temprano (2007)
- Génesis – EP (2010)
- La bestia (2015)

=== Serial Asesino ===
- Serial en el Parque (2009)
- Lo que llevamos dentro – Solo guitar on "Lo que llevamos dentro" (2012)

=== Solo ===
- Procrastinación/Procrastination (2010)
- Merry Heavy Metal Christmas (2012)
- Games – EP (B sides) (2013)
- Organic I (2013)

=== Guest appearances ===
- 6 Voltios – Descompresión – Solo guitar on "Libertad" (2006)
- Nos Sobra Aliento – Electric guitars (2011)
- Daniel F – La Ventana de los Cíclopes – Electric guitars (2012)
- Kobra and the Lotus – High Priestess – Electric guitars (2014)
- Kobra and the Lotus – Zombie single – Electric guitars (2015)

== Controversy ==
Although the heavy metal version of Peru's national anthem was successful, it also got detractors, mainly because it was done in a non-Peruvian musical genre.

== Other information ==
Parra has done, in his style, Salsa, Cumbia, Pop and Classical Music songs. He also played a guitar solo with the pop band Adammo in the release of their album "Amber" (2010).

Parra is sponsored by Kramer Guitars, EMG Pickups, Dean Markley Strings and Razer.
