= Bound for Glory (2009) =

2009 Total Nonstop Action Wrestling pay-per-view event

- Promotional poster featuring Sting
- Promotion: TNA Wrestling
- Date: October 18, 2009
- City: Irvine, California
- Venue: Bren Events Center
- Attendance: 2,400
- Tagline: The Final Curtain?

Pay-per-view chronology
| ← Previous; No Surrender | Next → Turning Point |

Bound for Glory chronology
| ← Previous; IV | Next → 2010 |

The 2009 Bound for Glory was a professional wrestling pay-per-view (PPV) event produced by the TNA Wrestling (TNA) promotion, which took place on October 18, 2009 at the Bren Events Center in Irvine, California. It was the fifth event under the Bound for Glory chronology, and was the premiere event for TNA in 2009.

Bound for Glory featured a supercard, a scheduling of more than one main event. Nine matches took place at the show. The headlining match showcased A.J. Styles defeating Sting to retain his TNA World Heavyweight Championship in a match voted by the fans as the Match of the Year. Other matches high up on the card saw Kurt Angle defeat Matt Morgan, Abyss defeat Mick Foley in a Monster's Ball match, and Bobby Lashley defeat Samoa Joe in a Submission match.

In October 2017, with the launch of the Global Wrestling Network, the event became available to stream on demand.

== Production ==
=== Background ===
The fifth installment of the Bound for Glory chronology was first announced in late 2008, when TNA released their PPV event schedule for February to October 2009. On the list, Bound for Glory was scheduled to take place on October 18. The location for Bound for Glory was first announced during a promotional video package which aired during TNA's anniversary PPV event Slammiversary on June 21, 2009, stating that it would be held in Los Angeles, California. Later that evening, TNA issued their first public written statement regarding the event via a press release announcing that Bound for Glory would be held at the Bren Events Center located at the University of California, Irvine campus in Irvine, California; contradicting their earlier promotional video package proclaiming it would be held in Los Angeles. Tickets for the event went on sale August 1, 2009. On August 23, 2009, TNA published an article on their official site giving a first look at the Bound for Glory 2009 poster, which featured Sting, an updated Bound for Glory logo, advertising for the event, and the tagline "The Final Curtain?". In August 2009, the official site for the fifth incarnation was opened at BoundforGlory5.com; Crawl Back In, a single by the rock band Dead by Sunrise to be featured on their debut album Out of Ashes was announced as the official theme song of the event on the site.

=== Storylines ===
Other on-screen personnel
| Role: | Name: |
|---|---|
| Commentators | Mike Tenay |
| Commentators | Taz |
| Ring announcers | David Penzer |
| Ring announcers | Jeremy Borash (Main event) |
| Referees | Earl Hebner |
| Referees | Rudy Charles |
| Referees | Mark Johnson |
| Referees | Andrew Thomas |
| Interviewers | Jeremy Borash |
| Interviewers | Lauren Thompson |

Bound for Glory featured nine professional wrestling matches and one pre-show match that involved different wrestlers from pre-existing scripted feuds and storylines. Wrestlers portrayed villains, heroes, or less distinguishable characters in the scripted events that built tension and culminated in a wrestling match or series of matches.

The primary match featured was between A.J. Styles and Sting, wrestling for the TNA World Heavyweight Championship. In August 2009 on the television show TNA Impact!, during a depressing period for Styles over his setbacks that year, Sting delivered a motivational speech to Styles that ceased him from retiring from professional wrestling. Wanting Styles to be the guy that carried the torch after him, Sting told him to get his head in the game and "claim what's supposed to be, yours!". Going on to earn his opportunity at the World Title the next week, on September 20 at No Surrender the next month, Styles faced off against Kurt Angle, Matt Morgan, Hernandez (who was cashing in his Feast or Fired briefcase he earned at the December Final Resolution 2008 PPV) and Sting in a five-way match for the title. On that night, Styles moved in for the victory when Sting stepped aside, allowing him to capture his first reign under the TNA World Title belt, after which turned into a celebratory night. Shortly later in the week, Styles, showing his gratitude, rewarded Sting a shot at his title on October 18 at Bound for Glory, an event that would transpire in Sting's home state of California.

A predominant feud was Matt Morgan rivaling Kurt Angle. Beginning in April 2009, Morgan, not a former world champion himself but noticed others who were invited to membership without those credentials, started campaigning to become a member of the villainous Main Event Mafia group, consisting of former world champions and headed by then-TNA World Heavyweight Champion Kurt Angle. He hired Morgan as an assistant and constantly vowed that while Morgan carried out a few tasks, he would also be under consideration as a member. After given the run-around for far too long, it turned out that Angle's intentions were to use Morgan to keep his reign as world champion. Their friction continued to heat up for weeks, and on September 20 at No Surrender, Morgan competed in a five-way match with AJ Styles, Hernandez, Sting, and Angle, who he cost a world title loss, and as a result, turned into a fan favorite. Morgan soon revoked his interest in Main Event Mafia, continuing his feud with Angle.

Another feud was between Abyss and Mick Foley. On August 16 at Hard Justice, after Foley lost to Kevin Nash to be dethroned of the TNA Legends Championship, Abyss saved Foley from a post-match attack involving a beat down with a barbed wire bat by Nash. Foley showed his appreciation by giving Abyss a gift in the form of one of his signature flannel shirts. On the September 16 episode of Impact!, Abyss helped fend off Nash from attacking Foley during a match, causing him to win by disqualification. The following week, when Foley teamed with Abyss to go up against Booker T and Scott Steiner for the TNA World Tag Team Championship, Foley turned on Abyss, becoming a heel and brutalizing him with a barbed wire bat. Abyss demanded answers, declaring he had idolized Foley and his barbaric ways that much of Foley's career epitomized, and was only trying to save him. Taking his help as an insult, Foley claimed that Abyss was a "carbon copy". After he described himself as hardcore and that Foley "used to be", Abyss challenged him to a Monster's Ball match at Bound for Glory.

== Results ==
| No. | Results | Stipulations | Times |
|---|---|---|---|
| 1^{P} | The Motor City Machine Guns (Alex Shelley and Chris Sabin) defeated Lethal Consequences (Consequences Creed and Jay Lethal) by pinfall | Tag team match | 05:51 |
| 2 | Amazing Red (c) (with Don West) defeated Alex Shelley, Chris Sabin, Christopher Daniels, Homicide and Suicide | Ultimate X match for the TNA X Division Championship | 15:17 |
| 3 | Sarita and Taylor Wilde (c) defeated The Beautiful People (Madison Rayne and Velvet Sky) by pinfall | Tag team match for the TNA Knockouts Tag Team Championship | 02:58 |
| 4 | Eric Young defeated Kevin Nash (c) and Hernandez by pinfall | Three-Way Dance for the TNA Legends Championship | 08:50 |
| 5 | The British Invasion (Brutus Magnus and Doug Williams) (c - IWGP) and Team 3D (Brother Devon and Brother Ray) defeated The Main Event Mafia (Booker T and Scott Steiner) (c - TNA) and Beer Money, Inc. (James Storm and Robert Roode) | Full Metal Mayhem match for the TNA World and the IWGP Tag Team Championships | 17:13 |
| 6 | ODB (c) defeated Awesome Kong (with Raisha Saeed) and Tara by pinfall | Three-Way Dance for the TNA Women's Knockout Championship | 07:29 |
| 7 | Bobby Lashley defeated Samoa Joe by technical submission | Submission match | 08:07 |
| 8 | Abyss defeated Mick Foley by pinfall | Monster's Ball match with Dr. Stevie as the special guest referee | 11:03 |
| 9 | Kurt Angle defeated Matt Morgan by pinfall | Singles match | 14:45 |
| 10 | A.J. Styles (c) defeated Sting by pinfall | Singles match for the TNA World Heavyweight Championship | 13:52 |
(c) / – the champion(s) heading into the match; P / – the match was broadcast on the pre-show
