= Out of the Pit =

Studio album by Kobra and the Lotus
- Released: April 22, 2010
- Genre: Thrash metal, heavy metal
- Length: 46:31
- Producer: Kevin Shirley

Kobra and the Lotus chronology
Out of the Pit (2010)	Kobra and the Lotus (2012)

Out of the Pit is the first studio album by Canadian heavy metal band Kobra and the Lotus. Released on April 22, 2010, it was originally produced by Greg Godovitz of Goddo, the vocals, mix and final production was redone by Iron Maiden producer Kevin Shirley prior to release.

== Background ==
The album is a concept album that discusses working through roadblocks that life places in the paths of people, and not being impeded by them.

== Track listing ==
1. It's Yours (4:42)
2. FOCFOM (4:29)
3. Cynical Wasteland (5:03)
4. Teaspoon of Metal (3:33)
5. Ballad of Jane Doe (5:38)
6. The Hooker (2:55)
7. Snake Pit (5:28)
8. Ride Like Sugar (3:17)
9. Ace of Spades (Motörhead Cover) (3:38)
10. Legend (8:00)

== Credit ==
=== Personnel ===
- Kobra Paige - lead vocals
- Matt Van Wezel - rhythm guitar
- Ben Freud - bass
- Chris Swenson - lead guitar
- Griffin Kissack - drums

=== Additional personnel ===
- Rik Emmett - additional guitars
- Kevin Shirley - producer, vocal recording
- Greg Godovitz - producer
- Nick Blagona - additional production, engineering, mixing on track 10
