= High Speed GTO =

EP by White Wizzard
- Released: 13 July 2009
- Genre: Heavy metal
- Length: 26:49
- Label: Earache Records
- Producer: Ralph Patlan

White Wizzard chronology
High Speed GTO (2009)	Over the Top (2010)

High Speed GTO is an EP by heavy metal band White Wizzard released on July 13, 2009. The CD release comes with a bonus music video for the song "High Speed GTO". The EP is the same release as their demo but with a different cover and a renamed track.

== Track listing ==
No.	Title	Length
1.	"High Speed GTO"	3:57
2.	"Celestina"	3:47
3.	"Into the Night"	3:05
4.	"March of the Skeletons"	4:35
5.	"Megalodon"	3:53
6.	"Octane Gypsy"	4:01
7.	"Red Desert Skies"	3:31

== Music video ==
A music video was filmed for the song High Speed GTO by music video director Dave Vorhes in 2008 before the EP came out. It won the 2008 Action On Film award for Best Music Video.

The music video features the band escaping from and then defeating a malevolent witch. The lead singer (first vocalist James-Paul Luna) also references the influence Iron Maiden has had on the group by wearing an Iron Maiden shirt.
