= Evolution (Kobra and the Lotus album) =

Studio album by Kobra and the Lotus
- Released: September 20, 2019
- Genre: Heavy metal, hard rock
- Length: 40:12
- Label: Napalm
- Producer: Michael "Elvis" Baskette

Kobra and the Lotus chronology
Prevail II (2018)	Evolution (2019)

Evolution is the sixth studio album from Canadian heavy metal band Kobra and the Lotus. The work was released on 20 September 2019 via Napalm Records.

== Background ==
In July 2019, the ensemble released "Burn!", the first single from the upcoming album.

== Critical reception ==
Blabbermouth.net states that "The upcoming LP sees the band imbued with a new fire that comes through by way of undeniable hooks, soaring guitar riffs, marching drum beats, and the soulful, bombastic vocal delivery of lead singer Kobra Paige" going on to say that "No longer bound by old formulas and expectations from the past, "Evolution" comes through with a sound that is expansive and, at times, borders on outright swagger" and that "Each song feels like an Active Rock hit in the making, while still having the grit and feverish intensity that longtime fans have come to admire from KOBRA AND THE LOTUS."

Joe Divita of Loudwire states that "The song drifts away from Kobra and the Lotus' metal leanings of past, digging into deep, rolling grooves of modern day hard rock" and that "This platform lets frontwoman Kobra Paige take the spotlight with her dominant set of pipes".

== Track listing ==
All tracks are written by Kobra Paige, Ronny Gutierrez, Jasio Kulakowski, and Michael Baskette.

No.	Title	Length
1.	"Evodem"	0:54
2.	"Evolution"	4:37
3.	"Burn!"	2:44
4.	"We Come Undone"	3:41
5.	"Wounds"	3:46
6.	"Thundersmith"	3:40
7.	"Circus"	3:42
8.	"Wash Away"	5:08
9.	"Liar"	3:32
10.	"Get the Fuck Out of Here"	3:23
11.	"In the End"	5:05
12.	"Tokyo" (Japanese bonus track)	3:16
Total length:		43:28

== Charts ==
Chart (2019)	Peak position
German Albums (Offizielle Top 100)	98
