= White Wizzard =

American heavy metal band

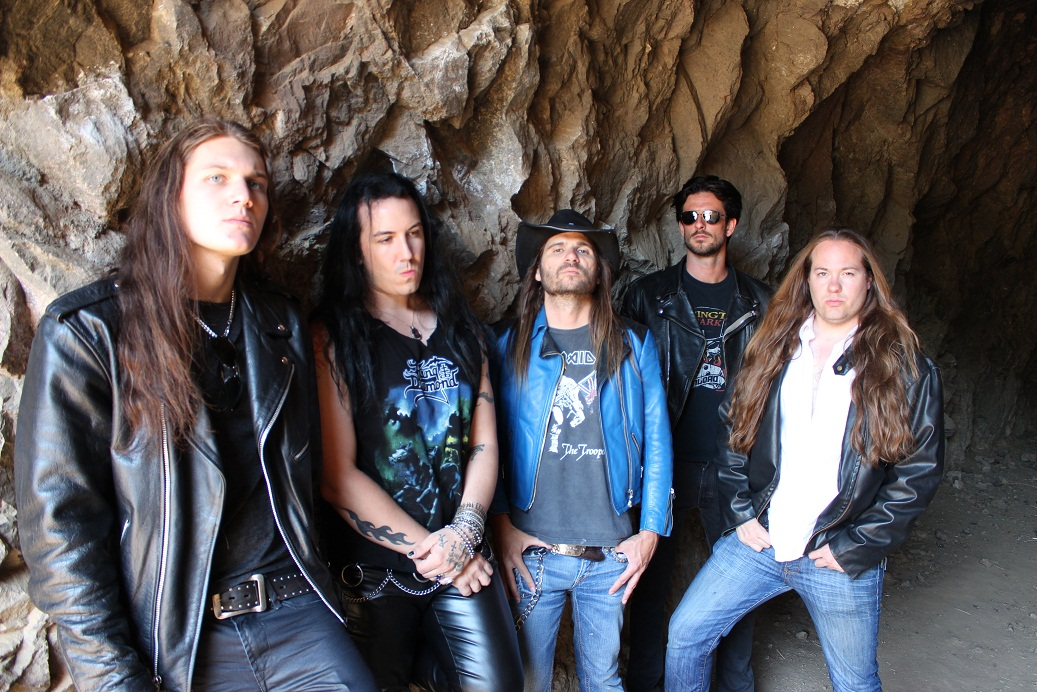
- The band in 2012

Background information
- Genre: Heavy metal
- Years active: 2007–2018; 2019–present
- Labels: M- Theory Audio; White Wizzard (former); Earache (former)
- Spinoffs: Holy Grail
- Members: Jon Leon; Tasos Lazaris; Justin Goldat; Sam Ruff
- Past members: Wyatt "Screamin' Demon" Anderson; James J. LaRue; Lewis Stephens; Joseph Michael; Jake Dreyer; Giovanni Durst; James-Paul Luna; Tyler Meahl; Jesse Applehans; Peter Ellis; Erik Kluiber; Chad Bryan

White Wizzard is an American heavy metal band from Los Angeles, formed in 2007. They have released one EP and four albums: Over the Top released in 2010, Flying Tigers released in 2011, The Devil's Cut released in 2013, and Infernal Overdrive released 2018. Throughout the band's history, it has undergone numerous lineup changes, with only Jon Leon remaining a stable member of the band. The end of the band was announced by Jon Leon in April 2018, however, he announced that he was reassembling the band in March 2019.

== History ==
=== Formation and early history: 2007–2010 ===
White Wizzard was formed in Los Angeles in the summer of 2007, as Jon Leon's response to the "angsty" and "screamo" music that dominated the heavy metal scene at the time:

"I saw so many old school metalheads at these summer festivals, but what else is out there? Who else can they look forward to seeing after they leave the show that can really give them the same thrill? They're all still here, but there's nothing in today's scene that moves them any more – nothing that inspires them. I think we can change that."

The first incarnation of White Wizzard was assembled and featured bassist Jon Leon, vocalist James-Paul Luna, guitarist James J LaRue and drummer Tyler Meahl. In late 2007, White Wizzard recorded its self-titled demo, White Wizzard, which would be released in mid-2008. The band also filmed a music video for the demo's opening track "High Speed GTO", which won the award for Best Music Video in the 2008 Action On Film Festival. After releasing the EP, Leon and the rest of the band disagreed on what musical direction to take and split apart with the other three members moving on similarly styled band, Holy Grail.

During mid-2008, Leon was contacted by Earache Records and asked to put the song "High Speed GTO" on Earache's compilation album Heavy Metal Killers. Motivated by this opportunity, Leon doubled his search efforts and eventually formed the second lineup of White Wizzard, featuring vocalist Wyatt Anderson, guitarist Erik Kluiber, guitarist Chad Bryan and drummer Jesse Applehans, though he was succeeded by Giovanni Durst after a short while. They released the EP High Speed GTO at this time.

White Wizzard has worked exclusively with Producer/Engineer Ralph Patlan since 2008.

=== Over the Top: 2010–2013 ===
On March 9, 2010, the band released its first full-length album, Over the Top. The album was mostly well received by critics.

The band toured North America with Korpiklaani, Týr, and Swashbuckle in January 2010. The North American tour was followed by a short UK tour with Edguy in March 2010, which began at Hammerfest II. White Wizzard had its live debut with its third lineup – featuring Michael Gremio and Lewis Stephens – at the famous Download Festival in June of that same year, opening the Ronnie James Dio stage on Sunday.

In March 2010, White Wizzard was nominated for Best New Artist in the Metal Hammer Golden Gods Awards 2010.

On October 5, 2010, Earache Records presented the band's new single, "Shooting Star", on YouTube. It was also released as a 7" Vinyl Single. This is the only White Wizzard release with vocalist Peter Ellis.

On September 19, 2011, the band released its second full-length album, Flying Tigers which featured vocalist Wyatt Anderson.

On August 1, 2012, the band released the song "Torpedo of Truth" with a new vocalist Joseph Michael (Midnight Reign, Peppermint Creeps), cousin of the late Ronnie James Dio.

=== Lineup and label changes, hiatus: 2013–2018 ===
In April 2013, Earache Records announced White Wizzard would release a third album titled The Devil's Cut. The album featured the stable lineup of Jon Leon, Giovanni Durst, Will Wallner, Jake Dreyer and Joseph Michael.

Vocalist Joseph Michael was fired by Leon on October 7, following a disagreement between the two. Shortly after, guitarists Jake Dreyer and Will Wallner left the band, leaving only Leon and drummer Giovanni Durst as members. Following these disagreements and abrupt lineup changes, Earache Records parted ways with White Wizzard on October 9, 2013.

On March 18, 2014, the band released the single "Marathon Of Dreams" via their new label White Wizzard Records; it featured Jon Leon on lead vocals and Devin Lebsack on drums.

On April 1, 2016, White Wizzard released its new single "Break Out". In July 2016, the band announced a new album to be released in 2017 called Infernal Overdrive. Guitarist James J. LaRue and singer Wyatt Anderson had rejoined the band at this point, with new drummer Dylan Marks also joining. Infernal Overdrive was released on January 12, 2018. The album received mostly positive reviews and was more well received than White Wizzard's previous release.

On April 24, 2018, Jon Leon announced the immediate end of the band on Facebook; "So unfortunately I have to announce that White Wizzard is over. There will be no more albums or live shows."

=== Reformation: 2019–present ===
On March 26, 2019, Jon Leon announced on the White Wizzard Facebook page that he was reassembling the band with past members. Leon also stated that he had plans to do a Kickstarter campaign to fund a new album. White Wizzard released the single "Viral Insanity" featuring Mark Boals on March 4, 2021. In June and July 2022, White Wizzard toured as direct support for Anvil performing 40 shows throughout the US.

== Musical style ==
White Wizzard is notable among many heavy metal bands for drawing influence from older, traditional heavy metal bands such as Iron Maiden, Judas Priest and Dio, and is often considered part of the new wave of traditional heavy metal. These influences include melodic guitar riffs combined with aggressive drumming and wailing or singing vocals.

== Band members ==
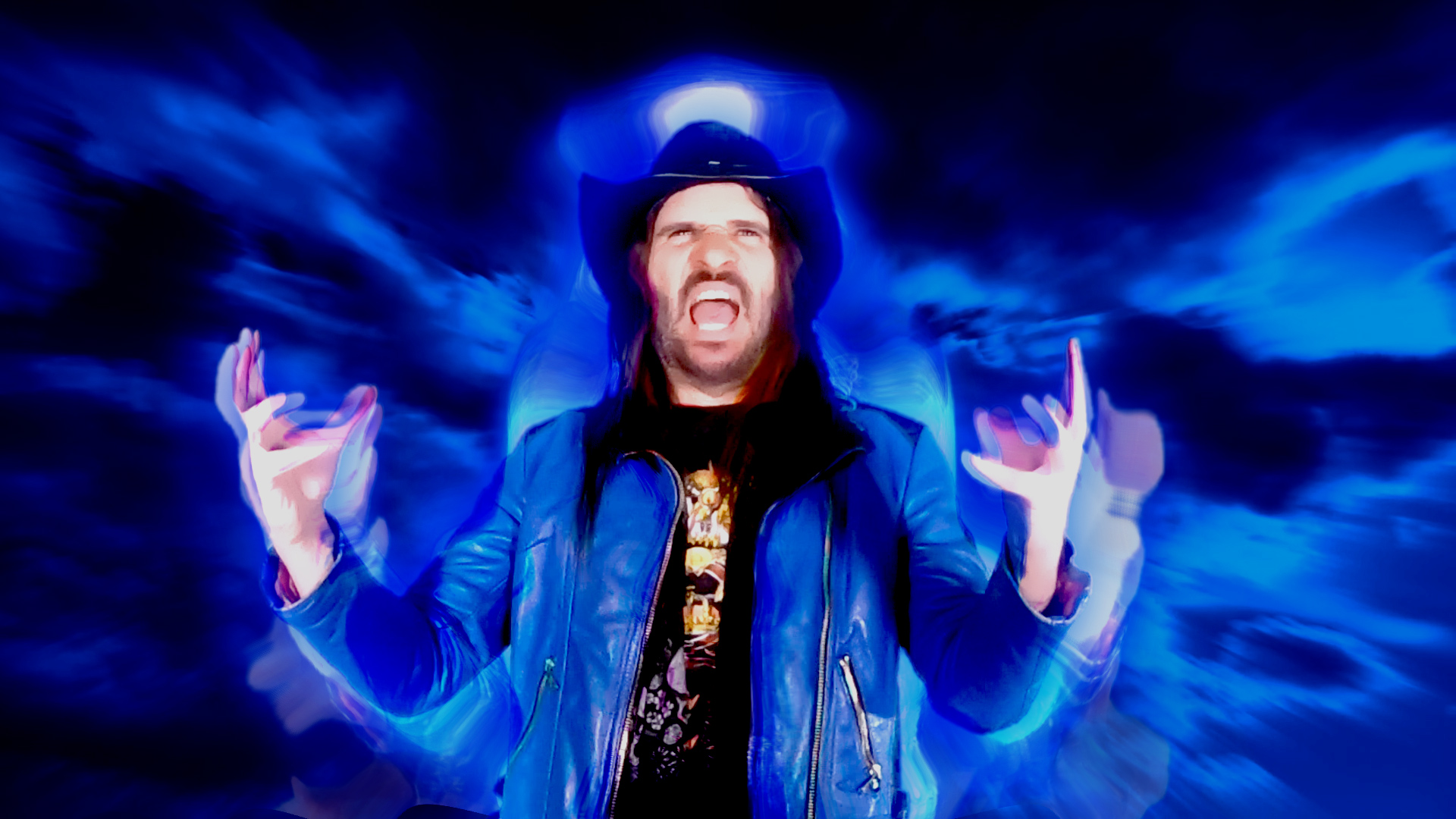
Jon Leon, the only continuous member of the band

The original lineup of White Wizzard included bassist Jon Leon, vocalist James-Paul Luna, guitarist James J LaRue and drummer Tyler Meahl. The band split up shortly after the release of the EP, and was reformed by Leon, along with vocalist Wyatt Anderson, guitarist Erik Kluiber, guitarist Chad Bryan and drummer Jesse Applehans. Applehans was replaced by Giovanni Durst after a short while.

James-Paul Luna, James J LaRue and Tyler Meahl formed Holy Grail in 2008.

In April 2010, it was announced that guitarist Erik Kluiber had been replaced. At the same time vocalist Wyatt Anderson also left the band. The new lineup was revealed in June 2010, with Michael Gremio, formerly of Nebraskan power metal band Cellador, on vocals, and Welsh guitarist Lewis Stephens replacing Kluiber. Gremio is the only White Wizzard vocalist not featured on any of their releases.

By September 2010, the lead vocals had been taken over by Peter Ellis.

On February 2, 2011, second vocalist Wyatt Anderson returned to the band, replacing a departing Peter Ellis.

On June 27, 2011, the band announced that it had parted ways with Wyatt Anderson once again.

On September 8, 2011, Jake Dreyer was selected to become the band's new guitarist.

On May 1, 2012, British guitarist Will Wallner joined the band just days before a show in Tokyo, Japan. Joseph Michael joined the band as vocalist in August 2012.

In October 2013, while on tour in the UK, Joseph Michael was fired from the band.

On October 9, 2013, Giovanni Durst, Will Wallner and Jake Dreyer made statements announcing their departure from White Wizzard.

By March 2014, Jon Leon had taken over as lead vocalist and Devin Lebsack had joined as drummer.

On December 1, 2015, White Wizzard announced the return of High Speed GTO guitarist James J LaRue.

On or around July 25, 2016, the band welcomed back singer Wyatt "Screamin' Demon" Anderson and guitarist James J. LaRue.

On April 23, 2019, Jon Leon released an official press statement regarding the band and the new lineup, which features former members Michael Gremio on vocals, James J. LaRue on guitar, Will Wallner on guitar, and Devin Lebsack on drums.

== Discography ==
Studio albums

- Over the Top (2010)
- Flying Tigers (2011)
- The Devil's Cut (2013)
- Infernal Overdrive (2018)

EPs

- White Wizzard (2008)
- High Speed GTO (2009)

Singles

- Over the Top (2010)
- Shooting Star (2010)
- Marathon of Dreams (2014)
- Break Out (2016)
- Storm the Shores (2017)
- Viral Insanity feat. Mark Boals (2021)
- Flight of the Icarus (2021)
- Witch Riders (2022)
