= Over the Top (White Wizzard album) =

Studio album by White Wizzard
- Released: February 8, 2010
- Recorded: September–October 2009
- Studio: Phase 4 Studios & Stealth Sound, Phoenix, Arizona
- Genre: Heavy metal
- Length: 46:47; 55:37 (with bonus tracks)
- Label: Earache
- Producer: Ralph Patlan

White Wizzard chronology
High Speed GTO (2009)	Over the Top (2010)	Flying Tigers (2011)

Singles from Over The Top
- 1. "Over the Top" Released: December 6, 2009

Professional ratings
Review scores
Source	Rating
Allmusic	3.5/5 stars
Blistering	6.5/10 stars
Classic Rock	7/10 stars
Metal Temple	7/10 stars

Over the Top is the debut album by the American heavy metal band White Wizzard released on February 8, 2010 in Europe and March 9, 2010 in North America, through Earache Records. The limited edition was available for pre-order on the Earache Records US webstore until February 8, 2010.

A music video for the song "Over the Top" was released on January 29, 2010. The video featured the band playing in a snowy Western town and combating a "Jazz Wizard".

The video was directed by Dave Vorhes, who directed White Wizzard's previous music video as well.

== Track listing ==
All lyrics are written by Jon Leon.

No.	Title	Music	Length
1.	"Over the Top"	Leon	5:08
2.	"40 Deuces"	Leon	4:35
3.	"High Roller"	Leon, Eric Kluiber	4:35
4.	"Live Free or Die"	Leon	5:35
5.	"Iron Goddess of Vengeance"	Leon, Kluiber, Chad Bryan	7:33
6.	"Out of Control"	Leon	4:01
7.	"Strike of the Viper"	Leon	4:05
8.	"Death Race"	Leon	4:21
9.	"White Wizzard"	Leon	6:58
Total length:			46:47

Limited edition bonus tracks
No.	Title	Writer(s)	Length
1.	"Gates of Gehenna" (Cloven Hoof cover)	Lee Payne	5:05
2.	"Heading Out to the Highway" (Judas Priest cover)	Rob Halford, K.K. Downing, Glenn Tipton	3:47
Total length:			55:37

== Personnel ==
=== White Wizzard ===
- Wyatt "The Screamin' Demon" Anderson - vocals
- Jon Leon - bass, lead and rhythm guitars on tracks 1,2,9
- Erik Kluiber - lead and rhythm guitars
- Chad Bryan - rhythm and harmony guitars (appears in the credits, but does not play in the album)
- Jesse Appelhans - drums
- Giovanni Durst - drums on bonus tracks

=== Production ===
- Ralph Patlan - producer, engineer, mixing, 2nd guitar solo on track 1, outro guitar on track 9
