= Kobra and the Lotus (album) =

Studio album by Kobra and the Lotus
- Released: August 6, 2012
- Genre: Heavy metal
- Length: 41:50
- Label: Universal
- Producer: Kevin Churko, Julius Butty

Kobra and the Lotus chronology
Out of the Pit (2010)	Kobra and the Lotus (2012)	High Priestess (2014)

Kobra and the Lotus is the second studio album by the Canadian heavy metal ensemble of the same name. Released on August 6, 2012, the album was produced by Kevin Churko.

== Background ==
The album was recorded in early 2011 with producer Julius Butty, who later toured the United Kingdom. Once the ensemble was signed to Universal Music Group, Kevin Churko had the group create four additional songs, with Churko producing, remixing and remastering the entire work.

== Track listing ==
1. 50 Shades of Evil
2. Welcome to My Funeral
3. Forever One
4. Heaven's Veins
5. My Life
6. Nayana
7. Sanctuary
8. Lover of the Beloved
9. No Rest for the Wicked
10. Aria of Karmika

== Personnel ==
- Kobra Paige - lead vocals
- Jasio Kulakowski - guitars
- Peter Dimov - bass
- Lord Griffin Kissack - drums

=== Additional personnel ===
- Charlie Del Magierowski - additional guitars
- Simon Paul - artwork, layout
- Darren "Jeter" Magierowski - engineering
- Kevin Churko - producer
- Julius Butty - producer
