= Out of Ashes =

Studio album by Dead by Sunrise
- Released: October 13, 2009
- Studios: Bay 7 Studios, Valley Village; Sunset Sound, Hollywood; Sparky Dark Studio, Calabasas; Level 7 Studios/Roxanne, Long Beach
- Genres: Alternative rock; alternative metal; hard rock
- Length: 43:43
- Label: Warner Bros.
- Producer: Howard Benson

Singles from Out of Ashes
- 1. "Crawl Back In" Released: August 18, 2009; 2. "Fire" Released: December 4, 2009; 3. "Let Down" Released: December 18, 2009

Out of Ashes is the only studio album by American rock band Dead by Sunrise, which consisted of Linkin Park lead vocalist Chester Bennington and Amir Derakh, Ryan Shuck, Anthony 'Fu' Valcic, Brandon Belsky, and Elias Andra of Julien-K. It was released on October 13, 2009 through Warner Bros. Records, to mixed to positive reception. The album was produced by Howard Benson. The album charted on the Billboard 200, peaking at No. 29. The album spawned three singles, "Crawl Back In", "Fire", and "Let Down". The album achieved moderate success in the US charts.

Songs on the album contain many personal experiences by Bennington in the previous years before the album's production. It was described as "really dark" and "much more of a rock album" than the works of Linkin Park.

== History ==
The first known song from Out of Ashes is "Morning After", an iTunes edition bonus track. "Morning After" was originally a solo song by Bennington, whilst a remix by Julien K appeared on the soundtrack of Underworld: Evolution.

Out of Ashes was originally slated for a 2006 release, when the group was still known as Snow White Tan. It was soon pushed to an early 2007 release, but due to his commitments to Linkin Park, Bennington held the record off indefinitely. The Pulse of Radio posted that Bennington's solo album was still in production and would be finalized in the spring of 2008. At this point, Bennington described in an interview with Rolling Stone that he hoped to see the album released in 2009, placing his full commitment to the album. The band made its debut in 2008 at Marquee Theatre at Tempe, Arizona. He also said in some interviews that he would be working on the record while simultaneously writing Linkin Park's then-unreleased fourth studio album, and that the songs on the album developed during that process.

== Style and composition ==
On the album's style Bennington said it "felt and sounded really good", but "they weren't right stylistically for Linkin Park" and described the songs as "darker and moodier" than the sounds of Linkin Park. Linkin Park co-lead vocalist Mike Shinoda stated that, compared to Linkin Park's work, Out Of Ashes is "much more of a rock album". Bennington also described the album in an interview with MTV that "It's really dark. It's like post-apocalyptic Blade Runner meets LSD". He also stated that all the songs were based on personal experiences. In the same interview, Bennington said,

It's not really all about one thing. It's about some dark stuff. It's about falling in love. It's about looking at the world from an outside perspective. All of those things add something a little different to the record. It does tell a story but, at the same time, each song does have its own life. I like the ebb and flow that the album has from the first song to the last.

As well as singing, Bennington also performs guitar and synthesizer on the album. All extra instrumental, programming and production was undertaken by Julien-K members Amir Derakh, Ryan Shuck, Brandon Belsky, Elias Andra, and Anthony "Fu" Valcic. Mike Lowther of Rukus compared the sound of the album to Stone Temple Pilots and Nirvana, with "grunge" and a "pop-rock" feel throughout Out of Ashes.

Ultimate Guitar Archive described it as "another one of the favorite songs from Out of Ashes, which is beautiful and meaningful throughout with another reverb based song with more guitar parts that are mellow and used in the song, still managing to sound excellent."

== Release and promotion ==
In the summer of 2009, the official name and release date for the album was announced. Dead by Sunrise went out on tour with Linkin Park during August, promoting Out of Ashes by playing three songs ("Fire, "Crawl Back In", "My Suffering") every show during Linkin Park's first encore break. The first single from the album, "Crawl Back In", was released for download on August 18, with an accompanying music video released on September 8. The entire album was uploaded to the band's official MySpace profile on October 9, just four days before the official release. The album did considerably well in the charts, and reached No. 29 on the Billboard 200.

On October 13, 2009, the same day as the album's release, Dead by Sunrise made their first television appearance on the Late Show with David Letterman. The band also performed on October 21, 2009 on Jimmy Kimmel Live!. After its release, Dead by Sunrise proceeded to tour throughout the United States, Europe, and Asia promoting the album.

On November 24, the second official single, "Let Down" was released, along with an accompanying music video. In the Ultimate Guitar Archive article, the song has been carefully explained as "quite an electronic and bass guitar type of song, even at the beginning of 'Let Down', and is another mellow song that makes Chester Bennington show off his soft vocals again, as the chorus becomes very good." A music video was filmed for "Let Down", along with a video for "Crawl Back In". Both videos were directed by P. R. Brown. The video was premiered on December 4, 2009 via YouTube.

Despite reports that "Inside of Me" and "Too Late" were going to be the next two singles. Even though these songs never saw official releases, "Inside of Me" was included as a b-side to the digital single of "Let Down". Ultimate Guitar Archive described it as "begin[ing] with a typical grunge type of riff with catchy verses and guitar parts that makes the track stand out. Although it was not quite as good as the previous songs, it is still considered as a very good song."

"Condemned" was included in the soundtrack of Saw 3D (in which Bennington starred as a skinhead), which was released on October 26, 2010.

In February 2024, Dead by Sunrise announced an exclusive 15th anniversary edition of Out of Ashes on vinyl for Record Store Day 2024, releasing April 20th. Pressings were limited to 10,000 copies. On October 11th, 2024, the band released the 15th anniversary edition to digital only.

== Critical reception ==
Professional ratings
Aggregate scores
Source	Rating
Metacritic	59/100
Review scores
Source	Rating
AllMusic	3.5/5 stars
Classic Rock	7/10 stars
Kerrang!	4/5 stars
Rock Sound	(8/10)
Rolling Stone	2.5/5 stars
Los Angeles Times	2/4 stars

Out of Ashes received mixed to positive reviews among music critics. At Metacritic, which assigns a weighted average score out of 100 to reviews from mainstream critics, the album received an average score of 59 based on 5 reviews, indicating "mixed or average reviews".

Gregory Heaney of AllMusic gave a favorable review of the album, saying that "As a whole, Out of Ashes is a solid record and a fine opening volley for Bennington's solo work." Gary Graff of Billboard described Out of Ashes as "grittier and more punk-driven" than the works of Linkin Park. Faye Lewis of Rock Sound said that it "throws down anguished alt-rock and enough crunching guitars and intense lyrics to frighten off Linkin Park comparisons."

Jody Rosen of Rolling Stone noted that the album is "oddly inert, lacking both the brute force and big choruses that raised Linkin Park to rap-rock godhead status." August Brown of Los Angeles Times commenting that "Out of Ashes has moments of spark, it's more scattershot and less ambitious than the music Bennington makes with Linkin Park." Jon Pareles of The New York Times called Out of Ashes "spacious, state of the art pop", but at the same time "shamelessly imitative", citing similarities to Nirvana, Pink Floyd, Green Day and Metallica. Classic Rock reviewer dismissed the album as "yet more brooding alt metal, ... a bit too ponderous at times" and "boasting the kind of lyrics that any troubled teen will identify with", when "a more pacey approach would have paid off big time".

== Track listing ==
All tracks are written by Chester Bennington, Amir Derakh, Ryan Shuck and Anthony Valcic.

No.	Title	Length
1.	"Fire"	3:50
2.	"Crawl Back In"	3:02
3.	"Too Late"	2:59
4.	"Inside of Me"	2:18
5.	"Let Down"	3:58
6.	"Give Me Your Name"	4:56
7.	"My Suffering"	2:39
8.	"Condemned"	2:32
9.	"Into You"	3:23
10.	"End of the World"	3:56
11.	"Walking in Circles"	4:43
12.	"In the Darkness"	5:27
Total length:		43:43

iTunes and Japanese bonus track
No.	Title	Length
13.	"Morning After"	3:29
Total length:		47:12

15th Anniversary Deluxe Edition
No.	Title	Length
13.	"Morning After"	3:29
14.	"Crawl Back In (Live in Las Vegas)"	3:11
15.	"Walking in Circles (Live in Las Vegas)"	4:50
16.	"In the Darkness (Live in Las Vegas)"	5:24
17.	"Let Down (Live in Las Vegas)"	4:06
18.	"Morning After (Live in Las Vegas)"	3:41
Total length:		1:08:24

== Personnel ==
Dead by Sunrise

- Chester Bennington – vocals
- Amir Derakh – lead guitar
- Ryan Shuck – rhythm guitar, beatbox vocals on "In the Darkness"
- Anthony 'Fu' Valcic – programming, synthesizer
- Brandon Belsky – bass guitar
- Elias Andra – drums

Production

- Howard Benson – producer
- Mike Plotnikoff – recording
- Hatsukazu "Hatch" Inagaki – engineer
- Marc VanGool – guitar technician, assistant engineer
- Andrew Schubert – assistant engineer
- Brad Townsend – assistant engineer
- Keith Armstrong – assistant engineer
- Nik Karpen – assistant engineer
- Chris Lord-Alge – mixing
- Ted Jensen – mastering at Sterling Sound in NYC, NY

== Charts ==
Chart (2009–10)	Peak position
Austrian Albums (Ö3 Austria)	11
Dutch Albums (Album Top 100)	82
French Albums (SNEP)	109
German Albums (Offizielle Top 100)	5
Japanese Albums (Oricon)	16
Japanese Top Album Sales (Billboard)	14
Scottish Albums (OCC)	93
Swiss Albums (Schweizer Hitparade)	18
UK Albums (OCC)	74
UK Rock & Metal Albums (OCC)	3
US Billboard 200	29
US Top Alternative Albums (Billboard)	9
US Top Rock Albums (Billboard)	12
US Top Hard Rock Albums (Billboard)	5

Chart (2024)	Peak position
Hungarian Physical Albums (MAHASZ)	25

=== Singles ===
"Inside of Me"
Chart (2010)	Peak position
US Mainstream Rock (Billboard)	40

"Too Late"
Chart (2010)	Peak position
US Adult Pop Airplay (Billboard)	39
