= The Devil's Cut =

Studio album by White Wizzard
- Released: June 3, 2013
- Genre: Heavy metal
- Length: 50:16
- Label: Century Media

White Wizzard chronology
Flying Tigers (2011)	The Devil's Cut (2013)	Infernal Overdrive (2018)

The Devil's Cut is the third studio album by heavy metal band White Wizzard, released on June 3, 2013.

A music video for the song "Strike the Iron" was released on October 22, 2013. It was directed by Don Adams.

== Track listing ==
No.	Title	Length
1.	"Forging the Steel" (Instrumental)	2:02
2.	"Strike the Iron"	6:47
3.	"Kings of the Highway"	4:40
4.	"Lightning in My Hands"	4:44
5.	"Steal Your Mind"	7:18
6.	"The Devil's Cut"	4:45
7.	"Torpedo of Truth"	6:10
8.	"Storm Chaser"	4:16
9.	"The Sun Also Rises"	9:34
Total length:		50:16

== Personnel ==
- Joseph Michael – Vocals
- Jon Leon – Guitar/Bass
- Jake Dreyer – Guitar
- Will Wallner – Guitar
- Giovanni Durst – Drums
