= Kobra and the Lotus =

Canadian heavy metal band

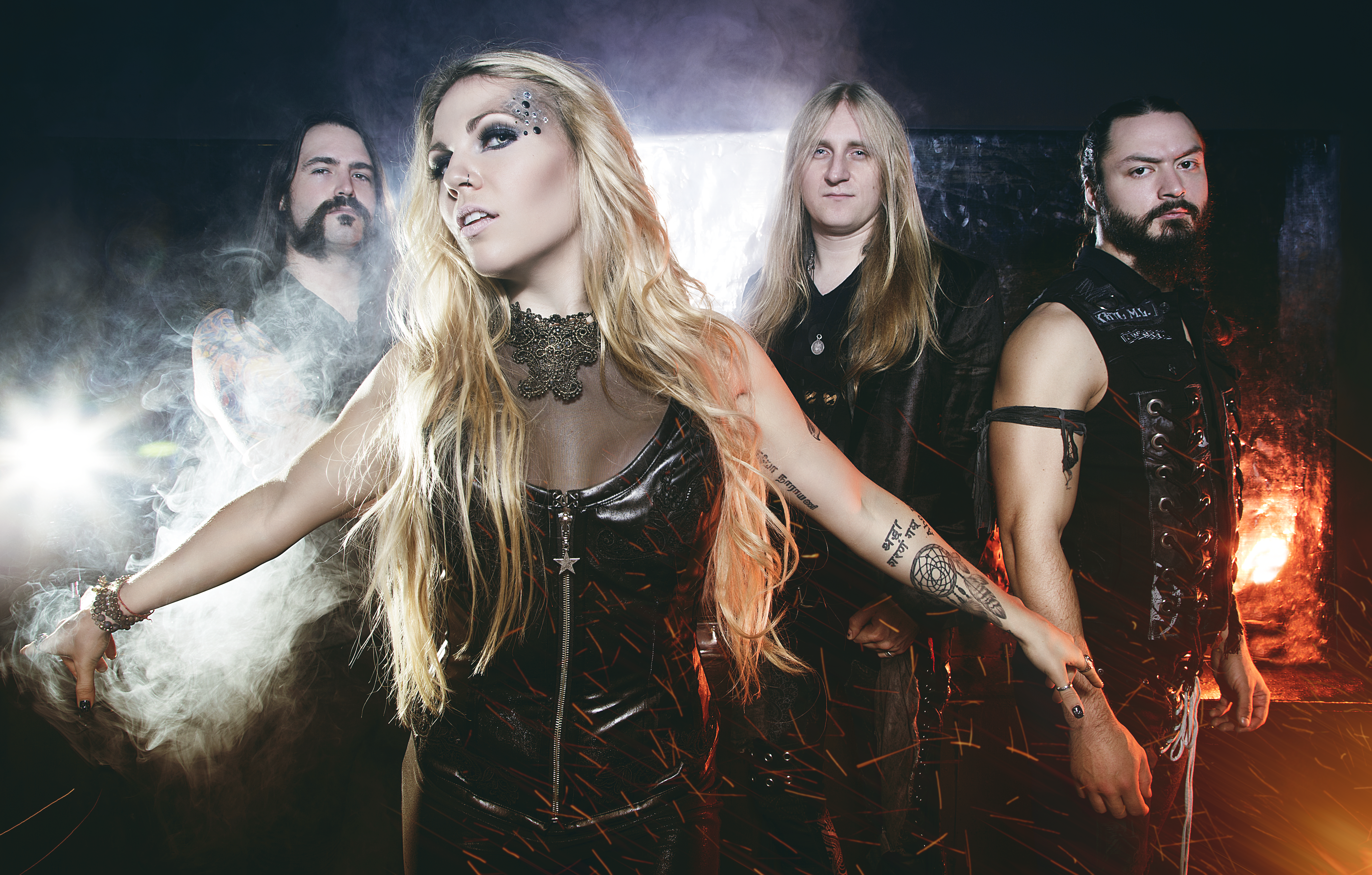
- Kobra and the Lotus in 2016

Background information
- Also known as: KATL
- Origin: Calgary, Alberta, Canada
- Genres: Heavy metal, hard rock
- Years active: 2009–present
- Labels: Napalm; Universal
- Members: Kobra Paige; Jasio Kulakowski; Brad Kennedy; Marcus Lee
- Website: kobraandthelotus.com

Kobra and the Lotus (also initialized as KATL) is a Canadian heavy metal band formed in 2009 by lead vocalist and songwriter Kobra Paige.

== History ==
=== Formation, Out of the Pit (2009–2010) ===
Kobra and the Lotus was formed by classical singer Kobra Paige. The band started recording their first songs in Calgary, initially produced by Greg Godovitz (Goddo). Kobra and the Lotus put the initial studio tracks on MySpace in summer 2009. They were subsequently discovered by Metal Hammer and approached to include Kobra Paige in the 2010 Metal Hammer Maidens of Metal Calendar with Simone Simons of Epica and Cristina Scabbia of Lacuna Coil.

The band recorded the first album Out of the Pit in Calgary in early 2009. During the mixing of the album at Metalworks Studios in Toronto, producer Greg Godovitz invited long time friend Rik Emmett to record a guitar solo to the only cover song on the album, a remake of Motörhead anthem Ace of Spades. After playing their first 2009 Canadian tour, Paige's vocal style had changed significantly and the band approached Kevin Shirley to rerecord the vocals and remix the album. The remix was so different that many industry writers thought the band had brought in a new lead singer. Producer Nick Blagona (Deep Purple) rerecorded the vocals and remixed the last track of the album "Legend". Kobra and the Lotus independently released their debut album Out of the Pit in March 2010. The album was a popular release on campus radio charts across Canada and several US internet Metal radio stations.

=== Kobra and the Lotus (2011–2012) ===
The band recorded their second album self-titled Kobra and the Lotus February to April 2011, with producer Julius Butty then headed to Europe for a UK summer tour. While touring, the band's manager Susan Bullen had been in touch with several labels regarding the second album and reached out to Mark Spicoluk at Universal Music Group and played some preliminary tracks from the new album. Universal Canada thought the album needed an anthem and encouraged the band to write four new tracks and go back into the studio January and February 2012 with fellow Canadian Kevin Churko to record the new tracks and remix and remaster the entire album. The songs "50 Shades of Evil" and "Forever One" were two of the new tracks written. The self-titled album was globally released in August 2012 in the UK and Europe by Spinefarm Records and in 138 other countries by Universal Music Group affiliates. It was then released in the US and Canada in April 2013 with Universal Music Enterprises UMe and T-Boy Records. The album rated as 7/8 POWERPOINTS by PowerPlay (music magazine) in issue #145, rated as KKKK by Kerrang!, and 8/10 by Metal Hammer.

=== High Priestess (2013–2014) ===
The band recorded 14 new tracks for their new album High Priestess with super producer Johnny K, a Grammy Award nominated producer/engineer/mixer/musician and songwriter at Groovemaster Recording Studios in Chicago. Charlie Parra del Riego joined as special guest guitarist for the recording. High Priestess entered the CMJ Loud Rock Radio charts in the US at #4, it was released globally on June 24, 2014. to strong reviews worldwide. The band toured the new album in North America with Kiss and Def Leppard in the summer of 2014. During the same recording session the band recorded "Zombie", a single featuring guest guitarist Charlie Parra del Riego that was later released on Halloween day (October 31, 2015). B-side is "Remember Me". There are two versions of "Remember Me" on the Kobra and the Lotus YouTube channel, one with an additional prechorus section. Digital and vinyl release only.

=== Break and Words of the Prophets (2015–2016) ===
After an extensive tour schedule that summer Kobra Paige was diagnosed with Lyme disease and took an eight-month break from touring to regain her health. To regain their momentum Paige reunited her band with Johnny K, to do a tribute to the Canadian classic rock legends they grew up on. Words of the Prophets was released globally on August 28, 2015. The EP contains heavier covers from Alannah Myles, Triumph, Bachman-Turner Overdrive, and April Wine. The EP closes out with a cover of Rush's song "The Spirit of Radio". Paige said it was the most challenging of the songs on the album due to the 9 time signature changes. The reggae-infused breakdown leading into the song's final minute was pumped up to give it more swagger. The band toured the new EP in Europe with Kamelot and Gus G in the fall of 2015. Subsequently, Paige became a guest singer with Kamelot for their Haven tour in North America and parts of Europe.

=== Prevail I and II (2017–2018) ===
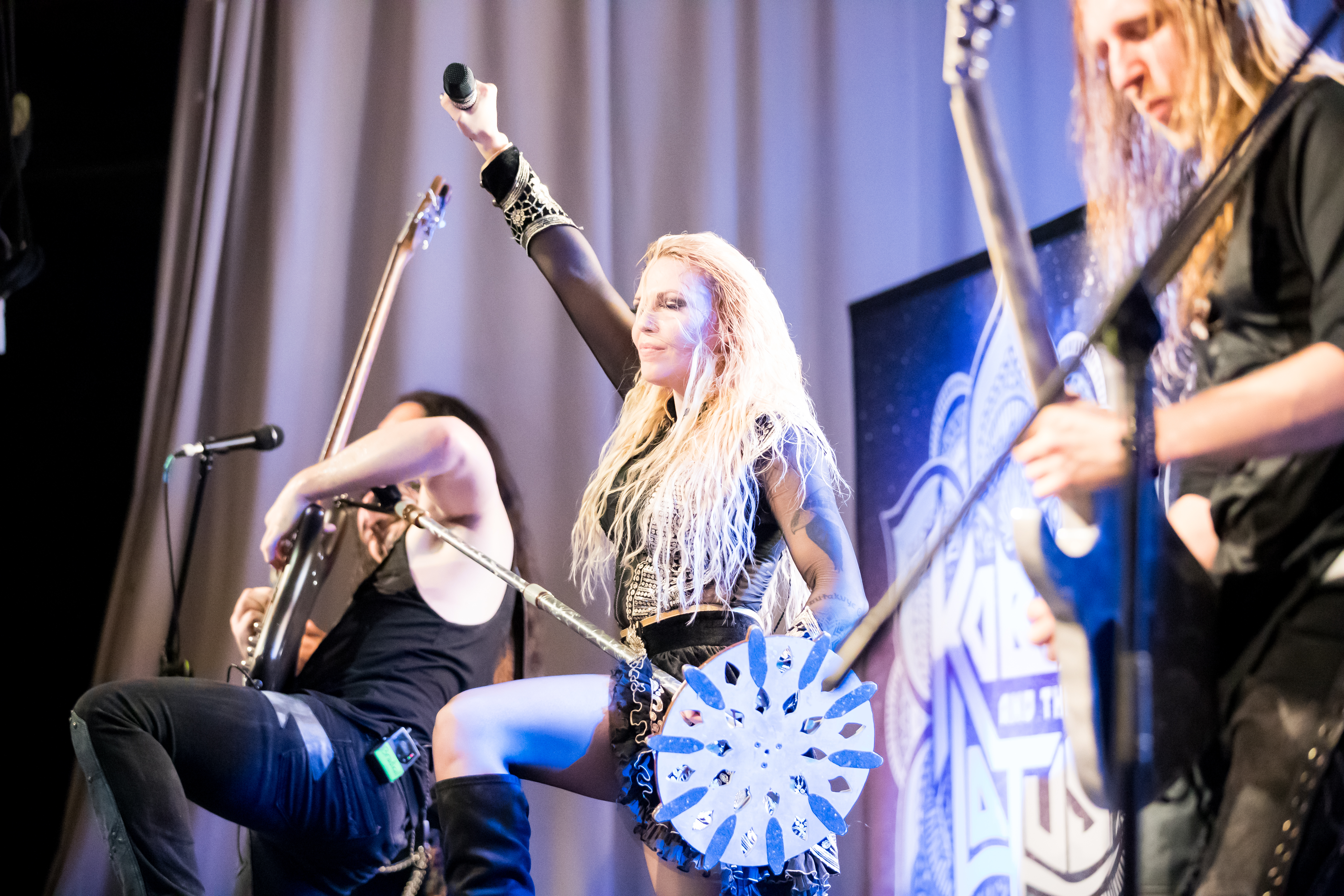
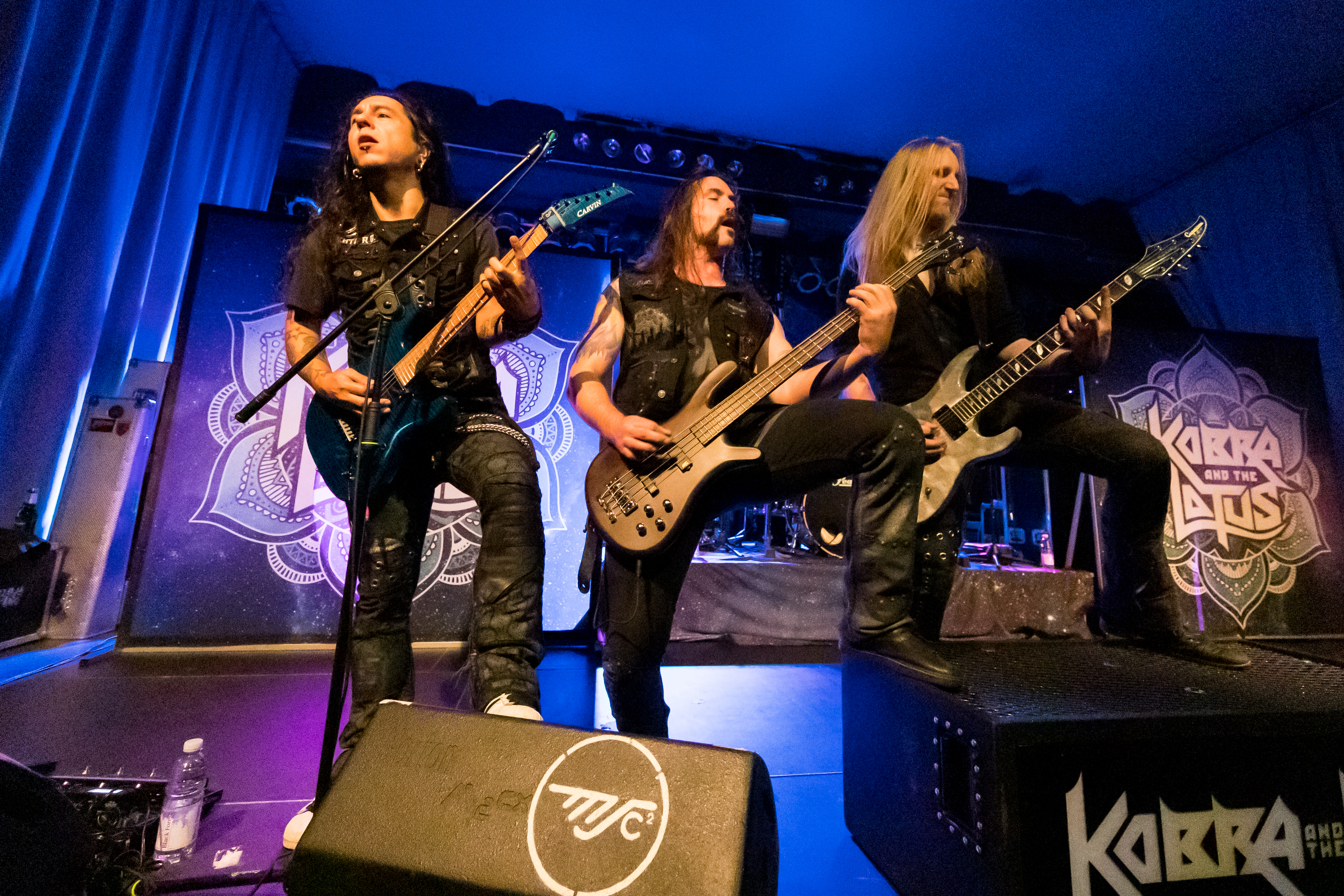
Kobra and the Lotus performing in 2018

The band recorded a double album after a successful pledge campaign with producer Jacob Hansen in Denmark. The new double album was picked up by Napalm Records with Managing Director Thomas Caser stating that Kobra and the Lotus was "one of the most exciting new bands in this (hard rock) genre". Prevail I and Prevail II was released separately, Part I released in 2017. The first single from Prevail I, "TriggerPulse", was released early to coincide with a fall European tour with Delain and Evergrey and became the first song by Kobra and the Lotus to gain over 2 million plays on Spotify. The back story for how "TriggerPulse" was written is on the main band website blog. The second single from Prevail I, "Gotham", was released on February 17, 2017, with exclusive premiers streaming via Metal Hammer and Brave Words & Bloody Knuckles. The third prerelease from Prevail I is "You Don't Know" that Napalm Records released on March 31, 2017. "Light Me Up" reached number 38 on the US Active Rock chart in December 2017.

Both Prevail I and Prevail II received positive reviews. "Light Me Up" broke into the Top 40 for mainstream rock on Billboard, peaking at #34 and also broke Top 40 on Mediabase active rock charts for several weeks. "You Don't Know" peaked at #53, with the music video being the band's first YouTube video with over 1 million plays. "TriggerPulse", a pre-release single to the album is the band's first Spotify release, with over three million plays in its first year. "Let Me Love You" was recorded in English, Japanese, and acoustic versions in the double album set. The official "Let Me Love You" video was released in Japanese. Prevail II was nominated for a Juno Award for Metal/Hard Album of the Year 2019.

=== Evolution (2019) ===
The band recorded Evolution, their sixth full-length album with producer Michael Baskette and was released on September 20, 2019.

== Tours ==
Kobra and the Lotus have played Sonisphere Festival, Download Festival, Rock am Ring and Rock im Park, Hard Rock Hell, Nova Rock Festival, Metaltown Festival, Hellfest, Graspop Metal Meeting, Gods of Metal, Wacken Open Air, Bloodstock Open Air, and Metal Female Voices Fest. Kobra and the Lotus have toured with Beyond the Black, Xandria, Delain, Kamelot, Kiss, Def Leppard, Judas Priest, Black Label Society, Max Cavalera, Slash, Gus G, Steel Panther, Buckcherry, Amaranthe, Fear Factory, Primal Fear, Stratovarius, Praying Mantis, Demon Hunter, Amanda Somerville, Hate Eternal, and Sonata Arctica. Paige toured as a guest vocalist with the Metal All-Stars super-group with Zack Wylde, James LaBrie, David Ellefson and others. Paige was also a guest vocalist for Kamelot on their North American Haven tour.

== Band members ==
Current

- Kobra Paige – vocals, piano (2009–present)
- Jasio Kulakowski – guitars (2012–present)
- Brad Kennedy – bass (2013–present)
- Marcus Lee – drums (2014–present)

Former

- Lord Griffin Kissack – drums (2009–2014)
- Ben Freud – bass (2009–2010)
- Matt Van Wezel – lead guitar (2009–2010)
- Chris Swenson – rhythm guitar (2009–2012)
- Pete Z Dimov – bass (2011–2013)
- Timothy Vega – lead guitar (2011–2012)
- Ronny Gutierrez – rhythm guitar (2018–2019)

Tour and studio guest musicians

- Alexander Carlegård – guest guitar (2013)
- Charlie Parra del Riego – lead/rhythm guitar (2012–2013)
- Bryan Buss – lead guitar/bass (2010–2011)
- Patrick Lawtey – guest guitars (2010–2011)
- Elias "Bones" Andra – guest drums (2014–2015)
- Jake Dreyer – lead guitar (2014–2015)

Timeline

== Awards and nominations ==
- Evolution, Nominated for a Juno Award for Metal/Hard Album of the Year 2020.
- Prevail II, Nominated for a Juno Award for Metal/Hard Album of the Year 2019.
- High Priestess, Kobra and the Lotus third album listed as #5 Best Album, 2014 Mid Year Recap by Metal Assault
- Kobra and the Lotus named as #3 Best Emerging Hard Rock & Heavy Metal Artists Of 2013
- Kobra Paige listed as one of the Top 25 Women in Hard Rock and Metal for 2013
- Kobra and the Lotus nominated for Best New Band at Golden Gods 2012 by Metal Hammer

== Discography ==
=== Studio albums ===
- Out of the Pit (2010)
- Kobra and the Lotus (2012)
- High Priestess (2014)
- Prevail I (2017)
- Prevail II (2018)
- Evolution (2019)

=== EPs ===
- Words of the Prophets (Titan Music, 2015)

=== Singles ===
- "Here Comes Silverbells!!" (Kobra Music Inc., 2009)
- "Zombie" (Kobra Music Inc., 2015)
- "Remember Me" (Kobra Music Inc., 2015)
- "TriggerPulse" (Napalm, 2016)
- "Gotham" (Napalm, 2017)
- "You Don't Know" (Napalm, 2017)
- "Light Me Up" (Napalm, 2017) – No. 34 US Billboard Mainstream Rock
- "Losing My Humanity" (Napalm, 2018)
- "Burn!" (Napalm, 2019)
- "Get the Fuck Out of Here" (Napalm, 2019)
- "Thundersmith" (Napalm, 2019)
