= Crawl Back In =

Single by Dead by Sunrise

from the album Out of Ashes
- Released: August 18, 2009
- Recorded: 2006–2009
- Genre: Alternative rock; hard rock
- Length: 3:03
- Label: Warner Bros.
- Songwriter(s): Chester Bennington; Amir Derakh; Ryan Shuck; Anthony Valcic
- Producer(s): Howard Benson

Dead by Sunrise singles chronology
"Crawl Back In" (2009)	"Let Down" (2009)

Music video
- "Crawl Back In" on YouTube

"Crawl Back In" is a song by American rock band Dead By Sunrise, which consists of Linkin Park lead singer Chester Bennington, as well as the band members of Julien-K. It is the first single and the second track from their debut studio album, Out of Ashes. It was released through iTunes on August 18, 2009. An official music video for the single was released on September 8, 2009, directed by P.R. Brown.

== Background ==
"Crawl back in"
A 45 second sample of the chorus and outro of "Crawl Back In" where lead singer Chester Bennington sings the chorus.

The song talks about Bennington's past problems with alcohol addiction, similar to many of the lyrical themes on Linkin Park's debut album Hybrid Theory. Bennington has stated in an interview with MTV that "It's a song about questioning your authenticity. I do that every once in a while; I wonder how many of my own thoughts are really my own, and how much influence do the people around me have on the person I am." MTV's James Montgomery described the song as "plenty dark" but "not pitch-black", as well as saying "Lyrically, the song details Bennington's slow climb back into the light — a climb that started with some serious self-discovery."

The song was rumored to be on the Transformers: Revenge of the Fallen soundtrack, which also features Linkin Park's "New Divide". Bennington later confirmed the rumor, however Bennington said he decided not to include it. The song was used as the theme song for TNA Bound For Glory 2009 PPV. The song was recorded live during Linkin Park's encore at the Sonisphere Festival 2009 in Knebworth and released free via e-mail for those who had previously downloaded the Sonisphere EP, which featured other artists who performed at the festival: Mastodon, The Used, Avenged Sevenfold and Taking Back Sunday.

== Music video ==
A music video was filmed for "Crawl Back In", along with a video for "Let Down". Both videos were directed by P.R. Brown. The video was premiered on the band's MySpace on September 8, 2009 and October 16, 2009 in YouTube. It was filmed in Vasquez Rocks Natural Park.

The video shows the band playing the song on a rocky area where huge broken statues of people are buried. Every member of the band is seen individually while Chester is singing the song. The statues refer to the people which Chester fears of becoming, which basically is the theme of the song. In the end of the video, Chester is seen standing inside a small triangle shape hole which also is the logo of Dead By Sunrise.

== Track listing ==
CD Single

All tracks are written by Chester Bennington, Ryan Shuck, Amir Derakh and Anthony Valcic.

No.	Title	Length
1.	"Crawl Back In"	3:03
2.	"Crawl Back In" (Live)	3:12
3.	"My Suffering" (Live)	2:55

Live tracks recorded at Cannstatter Wasen in Stuttgart, Germany on July 30, 2009.

Promo CD Single

No.	Title	Length
1.	"Crawl Back In"	3:02

== Charts ==
Chart (2009)	Peak position
Canada Rock (Billboard)	27
Germany (Official German Charts)	66
UK Rock & Metal (OCC)	24
US Adult Pop Airplay (Billboard)	11
US Hot Rock & Alternative Songs (Billboard)	22
US Rock Airplay (Billboard)	22
US Active Rock (Billboard)	9
US Heritage Rock (Billboard)	19
