= High Priestess (album) =

Studio album by Kobra and the Lotus
- Released: June 24, 2014
- Genre: Heavy metal
- Length: 44:51
- Label: Kobra Music Inc.
- Producer: Johnny K

Kobra and the Lotus chronology
Kobra and the Lotus (2012)	High Priestess (2014)	Prevail I (2017)

High Priestess is the third studio album by the heavy metal band Kobra and the Lotus. Produced by Johnny K, the album was released on June 24, 2014.

== Background ==
The band created fourteen new songs for the album at Groovemaster Recording Studios. The album made its debut in the CMJ Loud Rock Radio charts in the United States at #4.

== Composition ==
A lyric video was created for "I Am, I Am". The eighth video by the band, entitled "Soldier", was shot in a vacated mine in British Columbia with director Lisa Mann. The production features genuine World War II arms and clothing.

== Critical reception ==
The album received praise from Get Your Rock Out writer Michael Dodd, who singled out the song "Willow" as a "grippingly addictive highlight". He wrote that "With High Priestess the group can boast a true treasure, an album that is just too fun to not listen to again and again; a real force of awesome metal and one of the most addictive releases of 2014".

== Track listing ==
No.	Title	Length
1.	"Warhorse"	3:25
2.	"I Am, I Am"	4:16
3.	"Heartbeat"	4:28
4.	"Hold On"	4:26
5.	"High Priestess"	4:09
6.	"Soldier"	4:32
7.	"Battle of Wrath"	5:52
8.	"Visionary"	3:31
9.	"Willow"	4:01
10.	"Lost in the Shadows"	6:11
Total length:		44:51

- Mastered by Ted Jensen at Sterling Sound, NYC

== Credit ==
=== Personnel ===
- Kobra Paige – lead vocals
- Griffin Kissack – drums
- Jasio Kulakowski – lead/rhythm guitars
- Brad Kennedy – bass

=== Additional personnel ===
- Charlie Riego – additional guitars on tracks 2 and 7
- Elias Bones – additional drums
- Jake Dreyer – additional guitars
- Matt Dougherty – engineering
