= Infernal Overdrive =

Studio album by White Wizzard
- Released: January 12, 2018
- Genre: Heavy metal; progressive metal
- Length: 1:01:01
- Label: Trooper Entertainment
- Producer: Ralph Patlan

White Wizzard chronology
The Devil's Cut (2013)	Infernal Overdrive (2018)

Infernal Overdrive is the fourth studio album by heavy metal band White Wizzard, released on January 12, 2018. It was the last album released by the band before they temporarily disbanded on April 24, 2018.

== Reception ==
The album was well received, with critics calling it an improvement over the band's previous release, The Devil's Cut, which many felt was rushed. Metal Nation claimed that the album was the band's "best album to date", while Iron Skullet praised the album's performances and production quality. However, some critics felt that the album was rushed, and would have benefited from further editing and production.

== Track listing ==
No.	Title	Length
1.	"Infernal Overdrive"	4:53
2.	"Storm the Shores"	4:31
3.	"Pretty May"	3:18
4.	"Chasing Dragons"	8:16
5.	"Voyage of the Wolf Raiders"	9:39
6.	"Critical Mass"	8:34
7.	"Cocoon"	6:17
8.	"Metamorphosis"	4:36
9.	"The Illusion's Tears"	11:03
Total length:		1:01:01

== Personnel ==
- Jon Leon – bass, guitars, synths, bouzouki
- James J. LaRue – guitars (lead), synths, orchestration
- Wyatt Anderson – vocals
- Dylan Marks – drums
