= Prevail II =

Studio album by Kobra and the Lotus
- Released: April 27, 2018
- Genre: Heavy metal, hard rock
- Length: 53:13
- Label: Napalm Records

Kobra and the Lotus chronology
Prevail I (2017)	Prevail II (2018)	Evolution (2019)

Prevail II is the fifth studio album from Canadian heavy metal band Kobra and the Lotus. Released on 27 April 2018, the work was published through Napalm Records. In early 2018, the band toured alongside American red dirt metal ensemble Texas Hippie Coalition.

== Track listing ==
No.	Title	Length
1.	"Losing My Humanity"	4:22
2.	"Let Me Love You"	4:32
3.	"Ribe"	2:07
4.	"My Immortal"	5:03
5.	"Human Empire"	4:50
6.	"Heartache"	4:33
7.	"Velvet Roses"	4:08
8.	"Modern Day Hero"	5:59
9.	"You're Insane"	5:04
10.	"White Water"	6:03
11.	"The Chain" (Fleetwood Mac cover)	2:29
12.	"Let Me Love You" (acoustic bonus track)	4:03
Total length:		57:33

== Personnel ==
- Kobra Paige - lead vocals
- Jasio Kulakowski - lead/rhythm guitars
- Brad Kennedy - bass
- Jurek James - lead/rhythm guitars
- Marcus Lee - drums

== Awards and nominations ==
Year	Award	Category	Nominee/Work	Result	Ref
2019	Juno Award	Metal/Hard Music Album of the Year	Prevail II		
