= Prevail I =

Studio album by Kobra and the Lotus
- Released: May 12, 2017
- Recorded: 2016
- Genre: Heavy metal, hard rock
- Length: 45:34
- Label: Napalm Records
- Producer: Jacob Hansen, Ted Jensen

Kobra and the Lotus chronology
High Priestess (2014)	Prevail I (2017)	Prevail II (2018)

Prevail I is the fourth studio album from Canadian heavy metal band Kobra and the Lotus. Funded via crowdfunding site PledgeMusic, the work was released on 12 May 2017, with Prevail II, the second part of the double album scheduled to be released shortly thereafter. On 9 November 2016, the ensemble released "TriggerPulse", the first single from the album. On 17 February 2017, the ensemble released "Gotham", the second single from the album.

== Track listing ==
No.	Title	Length
1.	"Gotham"	5:28
2.	"TriggerPulse"	4:19
3.	"You Don't Know"	4:24
4.	"Specimen X (The Mortal Chamber)"	6:25
5.	"Light Me Up"	3:45
6.	"Manifest Destiny"	4:16
7.	"Victim"	4:20
8.	"Check the Phyrg"	4:10
9.	"Hell on Earth"	4:23
10.	"Prevail"	4:12
Total length:		45:34

== Credit ==
=== Personnel ===
- Kobra Paige - lead vocals
- Jasio Kulakowski - lead/rhythm guitars, engineering
- Brad Kennedy - bass
- Marcus Lee - drums

=== Additional personnel ===
- Dino Tomic - artwork
- Jacob Hensen - producer, engineering, mixing, mastering
- Jonas Hensen - engineering, recording
- Tim Tronckoe - photography
