= The Year the Sun Died =

Studio album by Sanctuary
- Released: October 6, 2014
- Recorded: 2014
- Studio: Soundhouse Studios, Seattle; Metalcamp Studios, North Bend
- Genre: Power metal, thrash metal
- Length: 49:46
- Label: Century Media
- Producer: Chris "Zeuss" Harris

Sanctuary chronology
Into the Mirror Live (1990)	The Year the Sun Died (2014)	Inception (2017)

The Year the Sun Died is the third studio album by American heavy metal band Sanctuary, released on October 6, 2014, in Europe, and eight days later in North America. It is Sanctuary's first studio album in 24 years, since 1990's Into the Mirror Black, and their only release with former Forced Entry guitarist Brad Hull, making it the band's first studio album without guitarist Sean Blosl, as well as their final release with bassist Jim Sheppard. The Year the Sun Died is also the first Sanctuary album released on Century Media Records, making it their first album not to be released on Epic Records, and the final one with original material to feature vocalist Warrel Dane before his death in December 2017.

== Background and production ==
In 2010, four of the founding Sanctuary members — Warrel Dane, Jim Sheppard, Lenny Rutledge and Dave Budbill — came together for a few select reunion performances. At first, they just planned on playing a few shows together, but the chemistry on stage between the members and the response from fans was so overwhelming that they decided to record a new album.

Commenting about how Sanctuary's reformation came about, Dane told Rock My Monkey TV, "Lenny Rutledge and I always talked to each other, but never really been friends again. And when the whole thing came about, that we were actually friends again, that's when we started talking more about doing it. And it definitely wasn't because Nevermore was imploding... which it was, at that point . . . We all just started talking with each other again. That was kind of the groundwork for it. And then we started saying, 'Well, gosh, let's make music again.' And my god! Lenny is writing some stuff that is so friggin great! But he's really writing some great stuff that's really inspiring me, and making me fall in love with music again, with the creative process...everything that revolves around that. Really inspiring me to write really evil lyrics."

The band entered the studio on February 2, 2014, to begin recording. Warrel Dane commented on the album, saying: "This record is not going to sound like the other two. It might sound very similar to the second one ('Into The Mirror Black'). It's definitely not going to sound like the first one, because we're all a little bit older and I can't come up with a c-clamp for a scrotum and a helium tank...It's not going to sound like the old ones. It's still gonna be that good, I think, and there's gonna be high-pitched screaming. I'm making sure of that. With Nevermore, high-pitched screaming was never really called for. You know, with Sanctuary... of course it is."

== Critical reception ==
Professional ratings
Review scores
Source	Rating
Blabbermouth.net	7/10
Metal Hammer	Favorable
Rock Hard	8.5/10
SLUG	Favorable
Sputnikmusic	3.7/5 stars

The album has received generally positive reviews from critics, although has been criticized for sounding more like a Nevermore album than the old thrash/power metal style of the band's first two albums.

Metal Injection stated, "The Year The Sun Died is a musical tour de force in that the solos and riffs are amazing, but the songs will stay in your head and simply take root there." Blabbermouth.net gave the album a 7 out 10 rating but noted, "The absence of Jeff Loomis from both Nevermore and Sanctuary is certainly telling on this album, despite a game effort from Lenny Rutledge and Brad Hull. Fans, however, can take heart that 'The Year the Sun Died' is, at times, a pretty cool ride — being what it is."

Metal Underground.com said that while they had expected an album that sounded more like 1988's Refuge Denied, they praised the band's evolution and post-nineties sound, giving it 4.5 out of 5 stars, stating: "Fans who expect things to go back to precisely where they left off are many of the same ones who refuse to explore music outside self-made walls, thus missing out on the true passion of music...exploration. Ironically, after multiple listens to 'The Year the Sun Died,' you quickly start to realize that Sanctuary has done precisely that, constructing the perfect bridge between 'Into the Mirror Black' and the entire Nevermore back catalog. Is it all pristine and amazing? It all depends on which shade of gray your melancholy desires. There is plenty here for both fans of Sanctuary and Nevermore. There is one thing everyone will agree on....this beast is heavy as fuck!"

On the musical similarities between Sanctuary and Nevermore, Warrel Dane said: "People associate my voice with Nevermore. I think the music sounds absolutely nothing like Nevermore. The vocals, probably yes. And I think that's what it is. But the music is completely different than Nevermore. It's a lot more simple, it's a lot more song driven, it's not so progressive and all that stuff that made Nevermore what Nevermore is [and] was. So I completely understand the comparison, and I'm okay with that, but there's other people that kind of got a little annoyed when everyone started saying it sounded like Nevermore. It doesn't bother me."

== Track listing ==
All tracks are written by Warrel Dane and Lenny Rutledge, except where noted.

No.	Title	Writer(s)	Length
1.	"Arise and Purify"		4:13
2.	"Let the Serpent Follow Me"		4:46
3.	"Exitium (Anthem of the Living)"		4:53
4.	"Question Existence Fading"		4:20
5.	"I Am Low"		5:15
6.	"Frozen"		5:46
7.	"One Final Day (Sworn to Believe)"		3:30
8.	"The World is Wired"		5:08
9.	"The Dying Age"		4:52
10.	"Ad Vitam Aeternam" (Instrumental)	Rutledge	1:30
11.	"The Year the Sun Died"		5:33

Mediabook edition bonus track
No.	Title	Writer(s)	Length
12.	"Waiting for the Sun"	Jim Morrison	3:48

== Personnel ==
=== Sanctuary ===
- Warrel Dane – vocals
- Lenny Rutledge – guitar
- Brad Hull – guitar
- Jim Sheppard – bass
- Dave Budbill – drums

=== Technical personnel ===
- Zeuss – production, engineering, mixing, mastering
- Aaron Smith – additional engineering
- Mike Sebring – assistant engineering
- Jack Endino – assistant engineering
- Travis Smith – artwork, design
- Patrick Häberli – photography

== Chart positions ==
Chart (2014)	Peak position
Austrian Albums (Ö3 Austria)	75
Belgian Albums (Ultratop Flanders)	143
Belgian Albums (Ultratop Wallonia)	183
Dutch Albums (Album Top 100)	83
German Albums (Offizielle Top 100)	39
Swiss Albums (Schweizer Hitparade)	69
US Billboard 200	125
US Heatseekers Albums (Billboard)	2
US Top Hard Rock Albums (Billboard)	11
US Independent Albums (Billboard)	26
US Top Rock Albums (Billboard)	40
