= Shadow Work =

Shadow Work may refer to:

- Shadow work, in economics, a special kind of unpaid labor
- Shadow Work (Warrel Dane album), 2018
- Shadow Work (Trapt album), 2020
- Shadow Work (Despised Icon album), 2025

== See also ==
- Shadow Works, a 2019 album by Kerli
- Shadow (psychology)
