= Forced Entry (band) =

American thrash metal band

- Also known as: Critical Condition (1983–1986)
- Origin: Seattle, Washington, U.S.
- Genres: Thrash metal; technical thrash metal
- Years active: 1983–1995; 2002–2003; 2026–present
- Labels: Combat; Relativity
- Members: Tony Benjamins; Colin Mattson; Steve Campbell
- Past members: Brad Hull

Forced Entry is an American thrash metal band formed in 1983 in Seattle, Washington as Critical Condition. The band released two studio albums, one EP, and three demos before breaking up in 1995. They have reunited twice, in 2002–2003 and in 2026. Although Forced Entry never achieved mainstream success, they are regarded as Seattle thrash metal pioneers, along with Metal Church, Panic, Bitter End, Coven, R.I.P. and Sanctuary (whom guitarist Brad Hull joined when they reunited in 2010, and left in 2015 after recording one album).

== History ==
The band was formed in 1983 by vocalist and bassist Tony Benjamins, guitarist Brad Hull and drummer Colin Mattson under the name Critical Condition. It was a cover band that played songs by Kiss, Judas Priest, Iron Maiden and AC/DC. Critical Condition changed their name to Forced Entry in 1986, and the following year released two demos, All Fucked Up and Thrashing Helpless Down. The latter won them the 1987 Northwest Music Award for "Best Metal Band".

The band released a third demo, Hate Fills Your Eyes, in 1988, which led to the band's first record label contract. After turning down offers from major record companies, including CBS and MCA, they were signed to Combat Records (a subsidiary of Relativity), and in January 1989 recorded their debut album, Uncertain Future, which was released that June. The album received some favorable reviews, particularly from Guitar World magazine. Forced Entry embarked on two major tours in support of Uncertain Future; along with Atrophy, they opened for Coroner on their No More Color tour, and were one of the supporting acts (along with Obituary) to Sacred Reich's The American Way tour.

They began recording their second and final album, As Above, So Below, in December 1990 at Normandy Sound in Warren, Rhode Island. The album was released in June 1991. Although the album achieved neither the underground success nor the critical acclaim of Uncertain Future, it received some positive reviews, and the music videos for "Macrocosm, Microcosm" and "Never a Know, But the No" were in heavy rotation on MTV's Headbangers Ball; the latter features cameos by the members of Alice in Chains. Forced Entry was soon dropped from Relativity, and as a result, the band never toured in support of As Above, So Below.

The band continued to play shows and tried, unsuccessfully, to sign with another label. In 1995, they released a four-song EP, The Shore, and played a final show in Seattle in August. They reunited for a one-off performance at the Abrasive Rock Festival in 2002. Forced Entry was supposed to play another show in August 2003 at that year's edition of Seattle Metal Fest, but withdrew "for personal reasons" and the band had since split up again.

Hull continued to be active in the music industry, joining local bands such as L.S. Diablo, Sac Lunch and Thug, and joined the reunited Sanctuary in 2011, appearing on their third album The Year the Sun Died (2014), but left in 2015. He also formed L.S. Diablo, with his son Riley and Aaron Goff both on both guitar and Paul Marshall on drums, in 2009, performing bass and vocals on their self-produced six-song album. Benjamins and Mattson jammed in local band called DUMT, but both later retired from the music industry. In 1993, Hull and Benjamins appeared in an episode of "The Lame List", a recurring segment of the local Seattle television comedy Almost Live!.

Century Media reissued Uncertain Future in 1999 with The Shore as bonus tracks, while Lost and Found Records reissued As Above, So Below in 2009.

On November 27, 2020, Metal Storm reported that a reunion of Forced Entry was in the works. This coincided with the band's music becoming available for the first time on all streaming outlets. On February 15, 2021, Benjamins and Mattson confirmed in an interview with Misery Point Radio that they were in talks of reforming Forced Entry for shows and possibly new material, with Jeff Loomis, Russ Stefanovich of Bitter End or Dean Babbitt of Coven drafted as potential fill-ins for Hull, who was reportedly unavailable. There were no updates on the progress of the reunion until August 2026, when it was announced that the band would be playing their first show in nearly 25 years at the Blades of Steel Metal Festival in Madison, Wisconsin. Steve Campbell was also confirmed to the band's new guitarist, replacing Hull, who is currently serving a sentence for drug possession. To coincide with the band's reunion, M-Theory Records will release a compilation album featuring tracks from Forced Entry's early demos in 2027.

== Band members ==
Current

- Tony Benjamins – vocals, bass (1983–1995, 2002–2003, 2026–present)
- Colin Mattson – drums (1983–1995, 2002–2003, 2026–present)
- Steve Campbell – guitars (2026–present)

Former

- Brad Hull – guitars, vocals (1983–1995, 2002–2003)

== Discography ==
=== Studio albums ===
Year	Title
1989	Uncertain Future: Record label: Combat Records; Released: June 30, 1989; Formats: CD, 12" vinyl, cassette
1991	As Above, So Below: Record label: Relativity Records; Released: June 14, 1991; Formats: CD, cassette

=== EPs ===
Year	Title
1995	The Shore: Record label: Morning Wood; Released: 1995; Format: CD

=== Demos ===
Year	Title
1987	All Fucked Up: Released: 1987; Format: Cassette
1987	Thrashing Helpless Down: Released: 1987; Format: Cassette
1988	Hate Fills Your Eyes: Released: 1988; Format: Cassette
