= The End of All Once Known =

Studio album by Switchblade
- Released: March 12, 2005
- Recorded: December 2004
- Genres: Thrash metal Melodic death metal
- Length: 40:02
- Label: MGM Distribution
- Producers: Astennu and Switchblade.

Switchblade chronology
The End of All Once Known (2005)	Invictus Infinitum (2009)

"The End of All Once Known" is the debut album by Sydney based melodic death metal band Switchblade. It was recorded, produced and mixed by ex Dimmu Borgir guitarist Astennu at Amethyst Studios, Sydney, and mastered by Steve Smart at Studios 301, Sydney, Australia.

== Track listing ==
No.	Title	Length
1.	"Cataclysm"	4:38
2.	"Wings of Redemption"	4:58
3.	"Stabbing Machine"	4:08
4.	"Convulse"	4:28
5.	"Dissect"	4:31
6.	"Concrete"	3:02
7.	"Tremors"	4:31
8.	"Eradicate"	4:53
9.	"Incineration"	4:43

== Credits ==
- Colin "Sway" Druery - vocals
- Andrew Najdek - Guitar
- Scott Bernasconi - Guitar
- Mat Piccolotto - drums
- Ben Bessant - Bass guitar

== Artwork ==
- Album Artwork and Design by Benjamin White -

== Reviews ==
- - Album Review from TheMetalForge.com
- - Album Review from NoiseTheory.com
- - Album Review from Blastwave.co.uk

== Notes ==
- Ten tracks were originally recorded for the album. The missing track is a short instrumental intro which the band played live only a few times prior to recording the album. The track was scrapped before the album was released. Copies of the album with the instrumental intro may have leaked prior to the album's release.
- Eight out of the Nine songs on the album were written while Switchblade was a four piece band. When second guitarist Scott Bernasconi joined the band in mid-2004, the songs were re-worked. "Wings of Redemption" is the only track to be written by both Andrew Najdek, and Scott Bernasconi together.
