= Inception (Sanctuary album) =

Compilation album by Sanctuary
- Released: February 24, 2017
- Recorded: 1986
- Studio: Studio One (White Center, Washington); Triad Studios (Redmond, Washington)
- Genre: Thrash metal, power metal
- Length: 42:27
- Label: Century Media
- Producer: Sanctuary

Sanctuary chronology
The Year the Sun Died (2014)	Inception (2017)

Inception is a compilation album by American heavy metal band Sanctuary, released on February 24, 2017, through Century Media Records. A prequel to the band's 1988 debut studio album Refuge Denied, the album contains remixed and remastered lost studio recordings from 1986. This is Sanctuary's final release with vocalist Warrel Dane, who died of a heart attack on December 13, 2017.

== Critical reception ==
Professional ratings
Review scores
Source	Rating
Metal Hammer	4/5 stars
Terrorizer	7/10

Olivier Badin of Terrorizer rated the album moderately positive, and wrote, "Zeuss' careful remastering job here has leased a new sense of life to these early versions. [...] And even with a then 25-year-old Warrel Dane in pure Rob Halford mode and a very mid-'80s power/thrash style, this doesn't sound dated at all and even actually has a sense of urgency its second version lacked." He concluded, "With 'Refuge Denied' hard to get these days, it's a win-win situation."

== Track listing ==
All tracks are written by Warrel Dane and Lenny Rutledge, except where noted.

No.	Title	Writer(s)	Length
1.	"Dream of the Incubus"		4:26
2.	"Die for My Sins"	Rutledge, Dane	3:40
3.	"Soldiers of Steel"	Rutledge, Dane	6:39
4.	"Death Rider / Third War"	Rutledge, Dane	4:14
5.	"White Rabbit"	Grace Slick	2:35
6.	"Ascension to Destiny"	Rutledge, Dane	5:06
7.	"Battle Angels"	Sean Blosl, Warrel Dane	5:19
8.	"I Am Insane"		4:02
9.	"Veil of Disguise"	Rutledge, Dane	6:23

== Personnel ==
=== Sanctuary ===
- Warrel Dane – vocals
- Jim Sheppard – bass
- Lenny Rutledge – guitar
- Sean Blosl – guitar
- Dave Budbill – drums
- Rich Furtner – bass (3, 7)

=== Technical ===
- Paul Chrisman – engineering (1–2, 4–6, 8–9)
- Mike Tortorello – engineering (3, 7)
- Stuart Hallerman – digital restoring
- Zeuss – mastering, restoring, mixing
- Ed Repka – cover illustration
- Nora Dirkling – layout
- Matt Akana – additional layout

== Charts ==
Chart (2017)	Peak position
Belgian Albums (Ultratop Wallonia)	124
German Albums (Offizielle Top 100)	53
