= Switchblade (band) =

Australian metal band

- Origin: Sydney, Australia
- Genres: Melodic death metal Thrash metal
- Years active: 2001–2011
- Labels: AmpHead Music, MGM Distribution
- Members: Adam Helmrich; Andrew Najdek; Anthony Delvecchio; Mat Piccolotto; Gerard Dack
- Past members: Sway; Scott Bernasconi; Ben Bessant; Chris Apps; Symon Alhaddad
- Website: www.switchblademusic.com.au

Switchblade were an Australian metal band from Sydney, Australia, formed in 2001 and disbanded in 2011. They released two albums and played support for bands such as Slayer, Machine Head, Exodus, Trivium and Nevermore during their Australian tours. They appeared at Metal for the Brain and the Come Together Music Festival.

== History ==
=== Formation (2001–2003) ===
Switchblade were formed by guitarist Andrew Najdek, drummer Mat Piccolotto and bassist Ben Bessant in 2001. The trio spent their final high school years playing metal cover songs and writing originals that would become early Switchblade demos. Vocalist Chris Apps joined the band before recording the band's first demo, but left following the recording.

In early 2002, Switchblade recorded a new demo and auditioned vocalists. Piccolotto answered an internet messageboard post by singer Colin "Sway" Druery, who joined the band in 2002. Switchblade began working on original material. A few months into rehearsals, Druery damaged his vocal cords and left Switchblade looking for another frontman. Najdek began using a seven-string guitar and tuning much lower than previously. The band moved away from thrash metal and death metal and toward groove metal, similar to Pantera, Machine Head and Fear Factory.

Switchblade recorded another instrumental demo at the end of 2002, the first new material written on a seven string guitar. Druery rejoined the band, wrote lyrics for the new material, and recorded his vocals on the instrumental tracks. Switchblade's demo Incoming was released in early 2003.

=== Incoming (2003–2004) ===
Switchblade performed in Sydney and toured interstate supporting local bands like Daysend, Sunk Loto and Dungeon. Piccolotto briefly joined local thrash metal band Descend, who disbanded shortly after. Najdek became a member of local power metal band Friar Rush.

In mid-2004, the band realised a single guitarist limited their musical output. They added second guitarist Scott Bernasconi, who played his first show with Switchblade on 19 June 2004. The band's material was re-worked to fit a second guitarist. Switchblade played a string of shows with now Los Angeles based tech-metal outfit Devolved, Sydney band Daysend, and Machine Head. Switchblade recorded their debut album with Astennu producing.

=== The End of All Once Known (2005) ===
The End of All Once Known was released on 12 March 2005, showcasing a more melodic and technical approach than before.

Switchblade then began a series of shows around Australia to support the album, but Bernasconi and Sway left the band after a final performance Sydney on 29 October 2005. During the final song of the set, Sway was joined on stage by a good friend of the band, Adam Helmrich, who was asked to join Switchblade almost immediately.

In late 2007 Bernasconi was the temporary live guitarist for industrial death metal band The Amenta on their 2007 Australia and New Zealand tour, replacing Psycroptic guitarist Joe Haley.

=== Comeback (2006) ===
Following the departure of Sway and Bernasconi, Switchblade took a break to focus on finding a second guitarist. With Helmrich already confirmed as new vocalist, Anthony Delvecchio was announced as the new Switchblade guitarist in early 2006. The new lineup was then booked to make its first appearance at the annual Metalstock Festival, held in Scone, New South Wales over the Easter weekend. Two weeks before the show Bessant relocated to Perth and cut off all contact with the band. Symon Alhaddad, guitarist for Sydney death metal/thrash metal band Vaticide temporarily filled in on bass guitar, eventually joining Switchblade permanently.

With the band's lineup now solidified, Switchblade went on to play a number of key local shows including the 2006 Come Together Music Festival, and a show at the Marquee, Sydney, which was filmed and recorded for a future live DVD. The band ended 2006 by appearing at Metal for the Brain and then supporting Nevermore in Sydney on the same day.

At the start of 2007, Switchblade had originally planned to cease all live shows however they were then offered the opening spot on a tour by Trivium. To capitalise on this appearance, Switchblade then played some tour dates around the country and featured on a national touring metal event billed as the Festival of the Dead.

=== Invictus Infinitum (2008–2011) ===
In 2008, Switchblade opted to put all live shows on hold and focus on the writing and recording of the new album. In a 30 July 2008 MySpace blog, Switchblade revealed the title of their follow-up album to be Invictus Infinitum. They also revealed that Alhaddad would be leaving the band, replaced with Gerard Dack of Infernal Method.

Invictus Infinitum was released in Australia on 6 June 2009 on Melbourne-based label AmpHead Music, and was supported by a national tour which included shows with Psycroptic, The Amenta, Daysend, Alarum, Frankenbok and many more. The album was mixed by Grammy Award-winning producer Neil Kernon in the US and featured Nevermore guitarist Jeff Loomis on the track "Reflective Curse."

On 15 October 2009, Switchblade capped off the year by supporting thrash metal band Slayer, for their one-off Australian performance of the seminal album Reign in Blood. It was also announced that the band would be supporting the newly reformed Wollongong-based band Segression, who were one of the most prolific Australian metal bands during the 90s, but had broken up in 2002.

In 2010, Switchblade played a small number of select shows including a Sydney festival for the 30th anniversary of long-running heavy metal store Utopia Records, with bands such as The Amenta, Daysend and more, and also supported thrash metal pioneers Exodus in Sydney. Soon after it was announced that the band was working on a new release due in 2011, and would be taking a short break from live shows.

In May 2011, the band posted an official announcement stating the members of Switchblade were parting ways, and moving on to other musical projects. Andrew Najdek and Gerard Dack are members of new Sydney melodic death metal band "Icon of Deceit" and Delvecchio plays in Sydney black/melodic death band Sanctium.

In 2025 Piccolotto was announced as the drummer in the newly reformed Daysend lineup.

== Members ==
=== Last active lineup ===
- Adam Helmrich – vocals (2006–2011)
- Andrew Najdek – guitar (2001–2011)
- Mat Piccolotto – drums (2001–2011)
- Anthony Delvecchio – guitar (2006–2011)
- Gerard Dack – bass guitar (2008–2011)

=== Previous members ===
- Colin "Sway" Druery – vocals (2002–2005)
- Scott Bernasconi – guitar (2004–2005)
- Ben Bessant – bass guitar (2001–2005)
- Chris Apps – vocals (2001)
- Symon Alhaddad – bass guitar (2006–2008)

== Discography ==
- Incoming (EP, 2003)
- The End of All Once Known (2005)
- Invictus Infinitum (2009)
