= 7 Horns 7 Eyes =

American band

- Also known as: 7H7E
- Origin: Seattle, Washington, U.S.
- Genres: Melodic death metal progressive metal, technical death metal, Christian metal (early)
- Years active: 2006–present
- Labels: Basick, Century Media
- Members: JJ Polachek; Aaron Smith; Brandon Smith; Sean Alf
- Past members: Kyle Wood; Ryan Wood; Steven Bye; Zack Uidl; Chris Weiford
- Website: 7 Horns 7 Eyes on Facebook

7 Horns 7 Eyes is an American Christian death metal band based in Seattle, Washington. The band formed in 2006 and released their debut album Throes of Absolution on April 24, 2012, on Century Media Records in North America and Basick Records in Europe. On January 10, 2014, after being silent for nearly two years, vocalist JJ Polachek announced the band was working on three potential releases for 2014 and 2015, described as a large conceptual work.

== History ==
=== Formation and 7 Horns 7 Eyes ===
In 2006, friends Kyle Wood, Brandon and Aaron Smith, Chris Weiford, and Steven Bye started 7 Horns 7 Eyes, which comes from Revelation 5:6 in the Bible. They recorded their self-titled debut EP in 2006 and released it in 2007. After 7 Horns 7 Eyes was released, Weiford and Bye left the band and were replaced by friend Sean Alf, and Ryan Wood, Kyle's brother.

=== "Huntour", Convalescence EP, and Throes of Absolution ===
In 2009, the band was selected for Demon Hunter's first annual "Huntour" along with the resurrected Living Sacrifice, The Famine, Focused, and Advent. After the "Huntour" the band began to record their first album and released the first single of the album, "The Vindicator". After recording the whole album, Kyle Wood left to get married. Aaron Smith then contacted his friend JJ "Shiv" Polachek of Monotheist, to be the new vocalist and re-record vocals. In 2011, the band released Convalescence EP and in 2012, their debut album, Throes of Absolution was released. After the release, Sean Alf left the band, and was replaced by Zack Uidl.

=== New album ===
The band announced that instead of the original plan of releasing three concept albums, they would make it one album, to be released in late 2017 or early 2018, recording the "traditional followup" to their debut album, Throes of Absolution, except that the lyrical focus would be on philosophy and their emotions and that they were no longer a Christian band.

== Members ==
Current

- JJ Polachek IV – vocals (Nekroi Theoi, ex-Ovid's Withering, ex-Monotheist, ex-Lorelei) (2010–present)
- Aaron Smith – rhythm guitar, backing vocals (2006–present)
- Brandon Smith – bass guitar (2006–present)
- Sean Alf – lead guitar (2008–2012, 2014–present)

Former

- Kyle Wood – vocals (2006–2010)
- Ryan Wood – drums (2008–2012)
- Steven Bye – drums (2006–2008)
- Zack Uidl – lead guitar (2012–2014)
- Chris Weiford – lead guitar (2006–2008)

Touring members

- Nick Pierce – drums (2014–2018)
- Alex Rüdinger – drums (2018–present)

Timeline

== Discography ==
Albums

- Throes of Absolution (2012) (Century Media)

EPs

- 7 Horns 7 Eyes (2007) (Basick Records)
- Convalescence (2011) (Basick Records)

== Other projects ==
- JJ "Shiv" Polachek is in bands, Ovid's Withering, Nekroi Theoi and Monotheist. He is featured in "Waifu" by Enpedestalment.
- Zack Uidl is featured in the song "Ignorance" by A Boundless Moment.
- Ryan Wood is currently playing in The Suffer Cult.
- Chris Weiford is currently playing in UV-SCOTI.
- Nick Pierce is the current drummer of Unearth.
- Aaron Smith produced the Jeff Loomis solo album, Plains of Oblivion, Binary Code's album Memento Mori, and Jared Dines' album, The Grey.
