= Shadow Work (Warrel Dane album) =

Studio album by Warrel Dane
- Released: October 26, 2018
- Recorded: 2017
- Genre: Progressive metal, thrash metal, gothic metal
- Length: 42:00
- Label: Century Media

Warrel Dane chronology
Praises to the War Machine (2008)	Shadow Work (2018)

Shadow Work is the second solo album by American heavy metal vocalist Warrel Dane from Nevermore and Sanctuary, released on October 26, 2018. Recordings for Shadow Work, the follow-up to 2008's Praises to the War Machine, started in fall 2017 at Orra Meu Studio, São Paulo, but after Dane's death on December 13, 2017, recordings stopped. After reviewing the material that could actually be completed using vocals from various studio and pre-production sessions with Dane, the decision was made to release his final recordings as Shadow Work.

== Track listing ==
1. "Ethereal Blessing" - 1:12
2. "Madame Satan" - 4:37
3. "Disconnection System" - 6:01
4. "As Fast as the Others" - 4:42
5. "Shadow Work" - 4:13
6. "The Hanging Garden" (The Cure) - 5:52
7. "Rain" - 5:41
8. "Mother Is the Word for God" - 9:32

== Credits ==
- Warrel Dane - vocals
- Johnny Moraes - Guitars
- Thiago Oliveira - Guitars
- Fabio Carito - Bass
- Marcus Dotta - Drums

=== Additional personnel ===
- Travis Smith - album cover
- Wagner Meirinho - production
- Lasse Lammert - editing, reamping, mixing, mastering
