= Plains of Oblivion =

Studio album by Jeff Loomis
- Released: April 6, 2012
- Recorded: Fastback Studios in Seattle
- Genre: Instrumental rock, progressive metal
- Length: 47:36
- Label: Century Media
- Producer: Aaron Smith

Jeff Loomis chronology
Zero Order Phase (2008)	Plains of Oblivion (2012)

Plains of Oblivion is the second studio album by former Nevermore guitarist Jeff Loomis, released on April 6, 2012, through Century Media Records; a limited Digipak edition was also released, containing two bonus tracks. The album reached the top 200 on five different U.S. Billboard charts. It features a number of guest musicians including Emperor singer Ihsahn, as well as guitarists Marty Friedman, Tony MacAlpine and Chris Poland.

== Critical reception ==
Professional ratings
Review scores
Source	Rating
Sputnikmusic	3.5/5

The staff at Sputnikmusic gave Plains of Oblivion a score of 3.5 out of 5, calling it "an excellent album for fans of heavy metal/thrash" and "an intense tour de force, one that further cements Jeff Loomis as one of the greatest shredders of all time."

== Track listing ==
All music is composed by Jeff Loomis, except where noted

No.	Title	Length
1.	"Mercurial"	5:31
2.	"The Ultimatum"	4:41
3.	"Escape Velocity"	4:31
4.	"Tragedy and Harmony" (lyrics: Christine Rhoades)	5:01
5.	"Requiem for the Living"	4:52
6.	"Continuum Drift" (music: Loomis, Aaron Smith, Joe Nurre)	5:38
7.	"Surrender" (lyrics: Ihsahn)	5:30
8.	"Chosen Time" (lyrics: Rhoades)	4:33
9.	"Rapture"	2:44
10.	"Sibylline Origin"	4:35
Total length:		47:36

Limited edition bonus tracks
No.	Title	Length
11.	"Collide" (lyrics: Rhoades)	4:36
12.	"Reverie for Eternity" (lyrics: Rhoades)	4:47

== Personnel ==
- Jeff Loomis – guitar, programming, arrangement
- Christine Rhoades – vocals (tracks 4, 8, 11, 12)
- Ihsahn – vocals (track 7)
- Marty Friedman – guitar (track 1)
- Tony MacAlpine – guitar (track 2)
- Attila Vörös – guitar (track 5)
- Chris Poland – guitar (track 6)
- Aaron Smith – guitar (track 6), programming (track 6), arrangement (track 6), engineering, mixing, production
- Dirk Verbeuren – drums
- Shane Lentz – bass
- Jason Lackie – engineering
- Jens Bogren – mastering

== Chart performance ==
Year	Chart	Position
2012	Billboard Heatseekers	2
2012	Billboard Hard Rock Albums	16
2012	Billboard Independent Albums	27
2012	Billboard Top Rock Albums	47
2012	Billboard 200	179
