= Warrel Dane =

American singer (1961–2017)

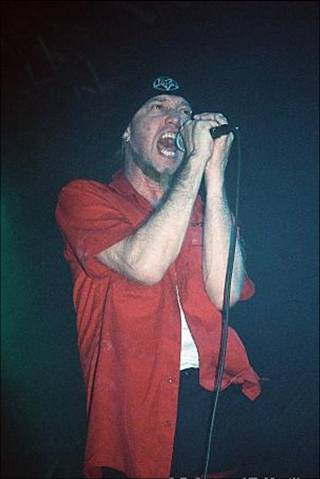
- Dane performing in 2005

Background information
- Born: Warrel George Baker; March 7, 1961; Seattle, Washington, U.S.
- Died: December 13, 2017 (aged 56) São Paulo, Brazil
- Genres: Heavy metal, progressive metal, thrash metal, power metal
- Occupations: Singer, songwriter
- Years active: 1983–2017
- Label: Century Media
- Formerly of: Serpent's Knight, Sanctuary, Nevermore

Warrel Dane (/ˈwɒrəl/; born Warrel George Baker; March 7, 1961 – December 13, 2017) was an American musician and the lead singer for the heavy metal bands Sanctuary and Nevermore. He was a natural baritone; though he was initially known for his high-pitched vocals with Serpent's Knight and on the first two Sanctuary albums. Later in his career, Dane became more recognized for his distinctively deep, dramatic voice.

== Early life ==
Warrel George Baker was born in Seattle, Washington, on March 7, 1961, the son of Warrel Clinton Baker and Virginia Baker. He was known by family and lifelong friends by the nickname "Wally". He was the youngest of several children; his older brother, Denny, was around twenty years his senior, and he grew up with three older sisters: Carol, Marilyn, and Terra.

Several events during Dane's childhood left a lasting impression on his outlook and later lyrical themes. At around the age of five, his mother regularly took him to visit an elderly, widowed neighbour whose wife had died and whose adult children had moved away; listening to the man's stories about youth, grief, and loneliness taught Dane about the fragility and impermanence of life, later serving as the direct inspiration for his 2008 solo song "This Old Man". During his school years, Dane befriended a disabled classmate who used crutches and eventually a wheelchair; witnessing the cruelty of other children who bullied the boy, Dane became his sole protector and companion, an experience that profoundly shaped his empathy and later inspired the song "As Fast as the Others" during the Shadow Work sessions. In addition, around age ten or eleven, Dane frequently stayed awake past midnight in secret to watch Seattle's television broadcast Nightmare Theatre, which fostered a lifelong fascination with atmospheric and psychological horror cinema.

Dane was raised as a southern baptist, but one of his grandmothers was a catholic, and she would take him to church every fortnight. Dane reported that because the church was next to the shore, he would skip Sunday school to go to the beach, and no one ever found out.

Dane grew up in a musically diverse household. His father, a natural bass who sang in a church choir, had a large collection of classical opera records, including works by Wagner and Puccini, which he frequently played at home. His older sisters exposed him daily to 1960s rock, folk, and psychedelic acts, such as Jefferson Airplane, Simon & Garfunkel, The Beatles, and The Doors, which significantly influenced his lyrical sensibilities. At around age ten, he regularly stayed awake past midnight to watch Seattle's late-night horror program Nightmare Theatre, fostering a lasting interest in atmospheric cinema. His mother initially opposed his growing interest in heavy metal, once breaking his vinyl copy of Mercyful Fate's Melissa after hearing the track "Black Funeral", though Dane later joked that he converted her with Accept's "Balls to the Wall".

Believing early on that he lacked singing ability, Dane began taking vocal lessons at the age of twelve. He subsequently undertook five years of classical operatic vocal training at the Cornish Institute of Arts in Seattle. He studied under an Irish vocal teacher whom he remembered as unorthodox but exceptionally skilled; she had him stand on his head against a wall to master diaphragmatic breathing and taught him yodeling scales, which became his primary lifelong vocal warm-up routine.

Dane began his active musical career playing guitar rather than singing. His first group was a cover band named Warhed, playing material by Black Sabbath, Iron Maiden, and the Michael Schenker Group. When the band was unable to recruit a lead vocalist, the drummer persuaded Dane to sing while playing guitar. Finding himself drawn more to vocal expression, he soon abandoned the guitar to concentrate entirely on singing.

== Career ==
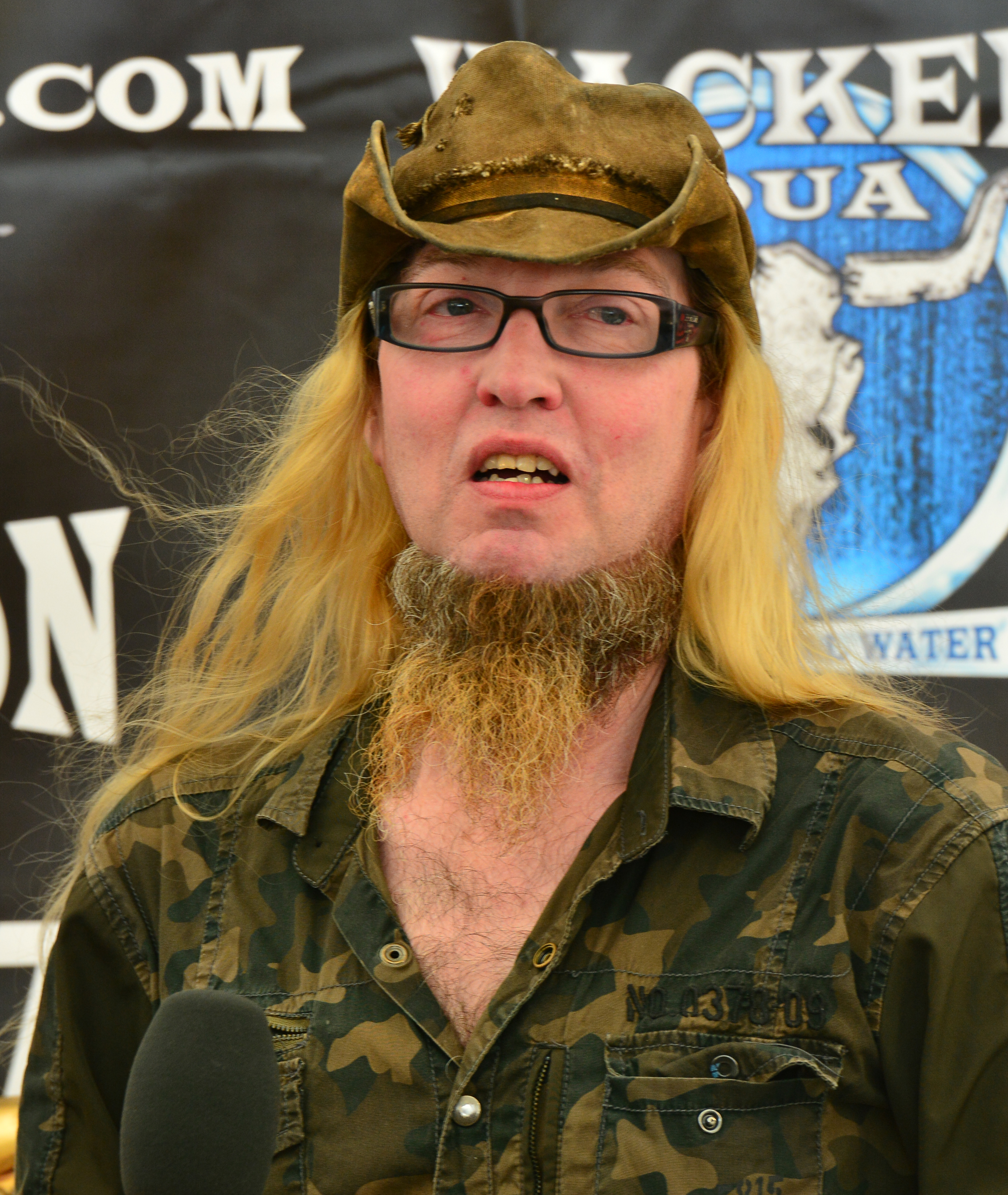
Dane at Wacken Open Air 2014

=== Serpent's Knight ===
In 1983, Dane joined the Seattle heavy metal band Serpent's Knight as their lead vocalist, alongside guitarists Brad Poland and Doug Stibbs, bassist John Kimmel, and drummer Michael Witkowski. The band lived and rehearsed together in a shared "band house", combining traditional European heavy metal influence, such as Iron Maiden, Judas Priest, Accept, and Mercyful Fate, with the energy of the emerging Pacific Northwest metal scene alongside contemporaries like Metal Church, Culprit, Fifth Angel, and the pre-Queensrÿche group Myth. The group was noted for its theatrical live performances, featuring corpse paint-style makeup, tombstones, and elaborate stage props.

Between 1983 and 1985, Serpent's Knight recorded a full album's worth of original demos showcasing Dane's early, operatic high-register falsetto singing. Years later, without Dane's consent or financial compensation, these early recordings were compiled and released in 2003 under the title Released from the Crypt, and later included on disc one of the 2010 archival release Silent Knight... of Myth and Destiny. Dane was publicly critical of the unauthorised release, expressing embarrassment over what he considered an unpolished, amateur vocal performance where he sounded like he was "sucking on helium". Dane left the group in 1985 to co-found Sanctuary.

=== Sanctuary ===
Around 1985, guitarists Lenny Rutledge and Sean Blosl, bassist Jim Sheppard, and drummer Dave Budbill were forming a new band in Seattle and sought a dedicated frontman. Having heard that Dane had recently left Serpent's Knight and was known for his love of dark, atmospheric music, Rutledge and Blosl composed an instrumental piece entitled "Wally's Song" specifically to entice him to join. Dane was impressed by the music and joined the group, which they named Sanctuary. Upon Dane's arrival, the band immediately dropped cover songs from their repertoire to focus exclusively on original material.

In August 1986, Dane, Rutledge, and Sheppard attended a Megadeth and King Diamond concert at the Moore Theatre in Seattle. Afterward, they visited Megadeth's hotel room and persuaded Dave Mustaine to listen to Sanctuary's demo tape in a car. Impressed by Dane's soaring four-octave vocal range and the band's songwriting, Mustaine offered to produce their debut album and arranged for them to sign with Epic Records. Released in 1988, Sanctuary's début album, Refuge Denied, established the band within the American power and thrash metal scenes, featuring a heavy cover of Jefferson Airplane's "White Rabbit" with guest guitar solos by Mustaine. The band subsequently toured the United States and Europe supporting Megadeth and Warlock.

In 1990, the band released their second studio album, Into the Mirror Black, produced by Howard Benson. The record demonstrated a more progressive, darker, and polished sound, tackling dystopian and sociopolitical themes on tracks such as "Future Tense". During the songwriting process, the band concluded that constant high-register falsetto shrieking no longer suited their evolving musical style; Dane consciously shifted down to his natural, brooding baritone register, which he cited as a crucial turning point in discovering his own authentic vocal identity. A live promotional EP, Into the Mirror Live, was recorded at The Country Club in Reseda, California, in May 1990.

Following their tour, guitarist Sean Blosl left Sanctuary and was replaced by eighteen-year-old Wisconsin native Jeff Loomis. By 1991, the explosion of the Seattle grunge movement dramatically altered the music industry landscape. Epic Records exerted intense commercial pressure on Sanctuary to abandon their heavy metal identity and adopt the fashionable grunge sound. This demand caused severe internal divisions between Rutledge, who was open to exploring the new direction, and Dane, Sheppard, and Loomis, who refused to abandon heavy metal. The creative rift culminated in a backstage physical confrontation between Dane and Rutledge, leading to Sanctuary officially disbanding in early 1992.

In May 2010, after nearly two decades of estrangement, Dane and Rutledge reconciled their friendship and reunited Sanctuary alongside Sheppard and Budbill, initially performing at festival dates such as ProgPower USA and Wacken Open Air. In 2014, Sanctuary released The Year the Sun Died, their first studio album in 24 years, via Century Media Records. Produced by Chris "Zeuss" Harris, the album featured modern, heavy riffing and Dane's mature, gritty vocal delivery, with select high-pitched passages appearing on three tracks. Guitarist Brad Hull joined the lineup for the album, later succeeded by Nick Cordle. In February 2017, the band issued Inception, a collection of restored and remixed 1986 studio recordings discovered in Rutledge's garage that had predated Refuge Denied. At the time of Dane's death in late 2017, Sanctuary had been actively composing material for a planned fourth studio album, tentatively titled Dead Again.

=== Nevermore ===
Immediately following the collapse of Sanctuary in early 1992, Dane, Sheppard, and Loomis formed Nevermore to pursue an uncompromisingly heavy musical vision. Loomis moved to Seattle from Wisconsin, sharing a small house with Dane and Sheppard in the Queen Anne neighbourhood. While Sheppard worked long restaurant shifts, Dane and Loomis spent their days writing music on an eight-track recorder. They recruited drummer Mark Arrington, later replaced by Van Williams. Working with producer Neil Kernon between 1992 and 1994, the group recorded two sets of four-track demos. Century Media Records signed the band and, convinced that the recordings were already album quality, had them mixed and released as Nevermore's self-titled debut in 1995.

In 1996, Nevermore released the five-track EP In Memory, featuring a medley cover of Bauhaus's "Silent Hedges" and "Double Dare", followed later that year by their acclaimed second full-length album, The Politics of Ecstasy. Named after Timothy Leary's book, the album featured intricate seven-string guitar work, progressive technical thrash structures, and Dane's sociopolitical critiques. In 1999, joined by former Forbidden guitarist Tim Calvert, Nevermore released the concept album Dreaming Neon Black. Lyrically based on recurring nightmares Dane had suffered following the mysterious disappearance of his former girlfriend Patricia Candace Walsh, the album traced the emotional collapse, grief, and descent into madness of a man whose lover was lost to a religious cult. Dreaming Neon Black received widespread critical praise and established Nevermore as a premier force in international progressive metal, supported by extensive tours with Mercyful Fate, Iced Earth, and Arch Enemy.

In 2000, Nevermore recorded Dead Heart in a Dead World at Village Productions in Tornillo, Texas, marking their first collaboration with British producer Andy Sneap. The album featured seven-string guitars across all tracks and included staples such as "Narcosynthesis", "The River Dragon Has Come", and a dark cover of Simon & Garfunkel's "The Sound of Silence". Following tour cycles with new second guitarist Curran Murphy, the band recorded Enemies of Reality (2003) with Kelly Gray in Seattle under severe budget cutbacks imposed by Century Media during tense contract renegotiations. The original release was widely criticised for its muddy mix, leading Sneap to completely remix and remaster the album for a 2005 reissue. In 2005, with guitarist Steve Smyth officially joining Loomis, Nevermore traveled to Sneap's Backstage Studios in Derbyshire, England, to record This Godless Endeavor. Hailed by music critics as a progressive metal masterpiece, the album integrated ferocious thrash intensity with intricate arrangements and Dane's theological and existential lyrics. That summer, Nevermore performed on Dave Mustaine's inaugural Gigantour festival across North America.

Following the release of their 2008 live package The Year of the Voyager, Nevermore reunited with producer Peter Wichers to record their seventh studio album, The Obsidian Conspiracy (2010), in North Carolina. The album presented a more concise, vocal-driven songwriting style. However, long-standing interpersonal tensions, grueling tour schedules, and struggles with substance abuse reached a breaking point. In April 2011, Jeff Loomis and Van Williams announced their departure from Nevermore, citing personal and musical irreconcilability. Although Dane and Sheppard insisted the band was merely on hiatus and Dane had already drafted lyrics for a future conceptual album, the classic Nevermore lineup never reunited before Dane's death in 2017. Dane later famously characterised Nevermore as "the greatest band that alcohol ever ruined."

=== Solo career ===
In 2007, during a touring hiatus with Nevermore, Dane began writing his debut solo album, Praises to the War Machine, released on May 13, 2008, by Century Media Records. Co-written and produced by former Soilwork guitarist Peter Wichers, with contributions from guitarist Matt Wicklund and drummer Dirk Verbeuren, the record adopted a more straightforward hard rock and melodic metal direction. The album provided a cathartic outlet for some of Dane's most intimate, autobiographical lyrics, notably on "Brother" (exploring his estrangement from his terminally ill older brother Denny) and "This Old Man" (inspired by a widowed childhood mentor), alongside covers of The Sisters of Mercy's "Lucretia My Reflection" and Paul Simon's "Patterns".

In 2014, Brazilian tour promoter Tiago Claro invited Dane to perform a series of solo concerts across Brazil celebrating the 15th anniversary of Nevermore's Dead Heart in a Dead World. For the tour, Dane assembled a backing group of Brazilian musicians: guitarists Thiago Oliveira and Johnny Moraes, bassist Fabio Carito, and drummer Marcus Dotta. Finding immense personal and musical rapport with the group, Dane adopted them as his official solo band and embarked on successful tours across South America and Europe. Around 2014, Century Media had proposed that Dane record a 1990s alternative covers album for his second solo release, but Dane abandoned the idea in favour of writing an aggressive, full-length original metal album titled Shadow Work.

By 2017, Dane was spending extended periods living in São Paulo, collaborating closely with his Brazilian band on Shadow Work. Unlike the melodic rock approach of his first solo album, Dane intended Shadow Work to be "brutally heavy", featuring extreme metal arrangements and a thrash-infused cover of The Cure's "The Hanging Garden". In late 2017, pre-production and tracking commenced in São Paulo with producer Roy Z. On December 13, 2017, Dane tragically died of a heart attack in his apartment with vocal tracking only partially completed. In 2018, with the blessing of Dane's family, his bandmates, Roy Z, and Century Media compiled the completed vocal tracks and finished instrumental sessions into an eight-track album. Shadow Work was released posthumously on October 26, 2018, featuring cover artwork created by Dane's longtime visual collaborator Travis Smith.

=== Other appearances ===
==== Television voice acting (Metalocalypse) ====
In 2008, Dane lent his voice to the Adult Swim animated musical comedy series Metalocalypse, guest-starring as the character "Candynose Twinskins" in the second-season episode "Dethfashion". Dane expressed enthusiasm for the voiceover experience and hoped to pursue further acting and animation roles later in his career.

==== Guest vocal appearances ====
Throughout his career, Dane contributed guest vocals to several projects across the extreme metal scene. In 2007, he provided clean vocals on the track "Inner Sanctum" for Polish extreme metal band Behemoth's eighth studio album, The Apostasy. In 2013, he performed guest vocals on the title track of Seattle melodic death metal band Shaded Enmity's album And Life Was Great.... In 2018, his guest performance was featured posthumously on the song "Eyes Wide Open" from Brazilian heavy metal band Lady Catman's debut album Eyes Wide Open.

== Artistry ==
=== Voice and musicianship ===
Possessing a naturally deep baritone speaking voice, Dane was celebrated for his dynamic and expansive vocal range, which spanned over four octaves. Trained for five years in classical opera at the Cornish Institute of Arts in Seattle, he initially made extensive use of a piercing, operatic falsetto and soaring head voice during his early tenure with Serpent's Knight and on Sanctuary's 1988 debut album Refuge Denied. However, during the songwriting for Sanctuary's 1990 follow-up Into the Mirror Black, Dane and his bandmates concluded that relentless high-register shrieking was artistically limiting and ill-suited to their darker, more progressive compositions. Dane consciously transitioned down into his natural, resonant baritone register, a decision he later identified as a pivotal breakthrough in discovering his authentic vocal identity.

In Nevermore, Dane developed one of the most recognisable and versatile vocal styles in modern heavy metal, characterised by a theatrical, brooding delivery that could shift rapidly between sorrowful, melancholic cleans, aggressive snarls, dramatic vibrato, and sinister, low-register rasps. Guitarist Jeff Loomis noted that Dane's ability to deliver soaring, melodic vocal hooks over down-tuned, seven-string death metal-inspired riffs gave Nevermore an unmistakable identity that set them apart from standard death metal growlers or power metal screamers. In the studio, Dane paid meticulous attention to vocal arrangement, crafting primary melodies first before building intricate, multi-layered harmonies at various intervals. To maintain his vocal health on tour, Dane relied on daily hydration, sleep, and the unconventional yodeling scales taught to him by his classical Irish vocal coach at Cornish. Although natural vocal aging led him to reserve his highest shrieks later in life, he underwent refresher vocal training in 2010 to restore his upper register for Sanctuary's reunion on The Year the Sun Died.

Although recognised primarily as a singer and lyricist, Dane possessed formal musicianship and was able to read sheet music. Having begun his musical career as a guitarist in Warhed, he frequently contributed musical ideas to Nevermore and Sanctuary beyond vocal arrangements. Rather than having a rigid separation between music and lyrics, Dane often hummed guitar lines and vocal melodies to Jeff Loomis, occasionally composing lyrics and vocal melodies before any guitar riffs had been written, as on "Garden of Grey". On "Believe in Nothing", Dane composed the song's chorus and conceptualised its guitar solo. In his solo work, Dane collaborated closely on song structures with producers Peter Wichers and Roy Z, emphasising vocal-driven rock and metal arrangements.

=== Songwriting and themes ===
Dane's lyrics were distinguished by their intellectual depth, existential bleakness, and philosophical weight, drawing directly on his formal academic background in philosophy, theology, and sociology. A central theme across his entire career was the critique of dogmatic organised religion and fundamentalism, which he viewed as a manipulative tool that bred division, guilt, and warfare. On Sanctuary songs like "Die for My Sins" and "Eden Lies Obscured", and Nevermore masterpieces such as This Godless Endeavor, Dane dissected theological hypocrisy, contrasting institutional dogma with individual conscience. Although frequently misconstrued as anti-religious or occult, Dane rejected both labels, identifying as an agnostic who advocated for personal philosophy, famously summarising his view as: "Start your own religion, because the ones we have right now just don't work."

Dane frequently engaged with pressing sociopolitical issues, state authoritarianism, and systemic corruption. On Nevermore's The Politics of Ecstasy (1996), inspired by counter-culture philosopher Timothy Leary's writings on seven levels of energy consciousness, Dane explored the erosion of personal liberty and governmental control over the human mind and body. In "The Tiananmen Man", he honoured political defiance against state oppression, while tracks like "Narcosynthesis" and "Medicated Nation", he attacked the pharmaceutical industry and mass-media commercialisation of psychoactive drugs. Dane maintained that his lyrics were not endorsements of drug use, but rather protests against government intrusion into bodily autonomy and civil liberties.

Autobiographical trauma and emotional catharsis were cornerstones of Dane's lyricism. His 1999 concept album Dreaming Neon Black served as an agonising artistic exorcism of the unsolved 1989 disappearance of his former girlfriend, Patricia Candace Walsh, tracing the emotional breakdown, guilt, and madness of a protagonist whose partner was lost to a religious cult. Dane drew substantial inspiration from his subconscious, keeping a notepad beside his bed to write down dreams immediately upon waking; recurring nightmares of Walsh drowning in water directly birthed the title track and imagery of Dreaming Neon Black. On his solo debut Praises to the War Machine (2008), Dane confronted childhood trauma and familial estrangement on "Brother", written about his terminally ill older brother Denny, and "This Old Man", inspired by a lonely widowed neighbour from his youth. Throughout his catalog, Dane maintained thematic continuity across albums and bands; for instance, the line "Lucy in the sky, long since dark" in Nevermore's "This Sacrament" directly called back to Sanctuary's 1990 song "Long Since Dark".

=== Influences ===
Dane cited classic heavy metal as the bedrock of his musical upbringing. He repeatedly identified Judas Priest's Rob Halford as his single greatest vocal inspiration, alongside Ronnie James Dio and Iron Maiden's Bruce Dickinson. In his youth, King Diamond was Dane's "absolute idol"; Dane famously traveled 250 kilometers from Seattle to Portland in full leather and spandex to meet Diamond at a record store signing during Mercyful Fate's first US tour, and years later called touring with Mercyful Fate in Nevermore one of the greatest honours of his life. Uniquely for a heavy metal frontman, Dane also cited American country music icon George Strait as a major influence on his vocal phrasing, warm low-end timbre, and emotional storytelling.

Outside of metal, Dane was a devoted fan of 1980s gothic rock, post-punk, and new wave, genres that heavily shaped his gloomy baritone delivery, aesthetic sensibility, and choice of cover songs. He held a deep admiration for Bauhaus, Peter Murphy, The Sisters of Mercy, The Cure, Depeche Mode, and David Bowie. Nevermore recorded a studio medley of Bauhaus's "Silent Hedges" and "Double Dare" on their 1996 EP In Memory; when Peter Murphy performed in Seattle, he invited Dane and Loomis backstage to personally praise their interpretation. Dane covered The Sisters of Mercy's "Lucretia My Reflection" on Praises to the War Machine, and recorded a thrash metal-infused rendition of The Cure's "The Hanging Garden" on his final album, Shadow Work. He also maintained an affinity for 1990s alternative rock, including Concrete Blonde, The Tea Party, and his Seattle peers Alice in Chains, and named Prince's Purple Rain as his all-time favourite album.

Dane's melodic sensibilities were heavily informed by 1960s folk and psychedelic rock, which his older sisters played constantly during his childhood. He cited Paul Simon as one of the greatest lyricists in popular music history, leading him to cover Simon & Garfunkel's "The Sound of Silence" with Nevermore and "Patterns" on his solo album; he named The Beatles' "Across the Universe" as his favourite song and cited Pink Floyd in Vancouver as the greatest live concert he ever witnessed. Simultaneously, Dane was an enthusiastic fan of extreme metal, regularly listening to Cannibal Corpse, Morbid Angel, Slayer, Emperor, and Behemoth. Beyond music, Dane drew immense lyrical inspiration from cinema and literature. A passionate cinephile, he claimed to have watched The Crow thirteen times in cinemas, cited David Lynch's Blue Velvet as a personal favourite, and drew the inspiration for Sanctuary's "Soldiers of Steel" from Michael Mann's horror film The Keep (1983) and Nevermore's Enemies of Reality from David Cronenberg's eXistenZ (1999). In literature, his influences ranged from classic horror fiction to the psychological concepts of Carl Jung and the counter-cultural treatises of Timothy Leary.

== Personal life ==
=== Family ===
Dane's father, Warrel Clinton Baker, died during Dane's youth. A formative memory from his youth was being present at the hospital alongside his older brother Denny when their father died; Denny told him that he was too young to be going through it, an experience Dane said emotionally scarred him. Following his father's death, Dane grew close to Vincenzo Mottola, an Italian restaurateur and mentor who became a close friend and father figure. Dane remained close to his three older sisters, Carol, Marilyn, and Terra, who had introduced him to 1960s music during his childhood. Dane never married and had no children of his own.

Due to a twenty-year age difference, Dane felt he never developed the close relationship with his brother that a younger boy might hope for, and Denny later became estranged from the family. When Denny was diagnosed with stage IV leukaemia, Dane channelled his unresolved childhood feelings into writing the song "Brother" for his 2008 solo album Praises to the War Machine, describing the process as a form of therapy. Dane stated that the song was not an expression of hatred, explaining that the wish to cure his brother's illness showed that he still cared despite the bitterness. The 2008 music video featured authentic home-movie footage from the Baker family. Denny Baker died on May 4, 2015, without ever hearing the song; Dane described the death as sudden from his perspective and expressed regret that he had never told his brother he loved him.

=== Cooking and restaurant career ===
During his time on Sanctuary and before Nevermore became financially sustainable, Dane supported himself as a chef for many years. He was professionally trained in Italian cookery by Neapolitan restaurateur Vincenzo Mottola, who taught him cooking techniques and the restaurant business, including how to handle pizza dough. Vincenzo owned a chain of restaurants called Vince's Italian Restaurant. Sanctuary's guitar player, Lenny Rutledge, also worked at Vince's as a janitor, and Sanctuary and Nevermore's bassist Jim Sheppard worked in the kitchen alongside Dane.

Dane and Sheppard worked for eight years at Vince's on lower Queen Anne Avenue. When Mottola decided to leave the business following a stroke, they bought the restaurant in 1997 and renamed it Enzo's Ristorante Italiano.

Managing a restaurant proved incompatible with touring. After returning from a Nevermore tour in 1997, Dane and Sheppard found the restaurant in disarray, with unmanaged food costs, depleted liquor inventory, and missing stock that staff had taken advantage of during their absence. Faced with choosing between the restaurant and music, they sold the business to focus fully on Nevermore. Cooking remained Dane's self-described "second passion" after music. He continued to cook regularly when not touring, preparing dishes such as gnocchi, lasagne, and pasta for friends, and joked that he could usually cook better than tour caterers. Friends remembered him as an avid foodie who frequently engaged in late-night phone conversations about recipes.

=== Relationships ===
Little is known about Warrel Dane's love life, except the tragic relationship that inspired Dreaming Neon Black.

Dane had previously been in a relationship with Patricia Candace Walsh, whose disappearance became the central inspiration for Nevermore's 1999 album Dreaming Neon Black. Walsh became involved with a religious group and subsequently vanished from Dane's life in 1989. Years later, while living beside Lake Washington, Dane began having recurring nightmares about her involving drowning; not knowing her fate, he incorporated the dreams and unresolved loss into the album's concept. Walsh had in fact been murdered by serial killer Robert Ben Rhoades after leaving Seattle in 1989, though her remains were not identified until 2003, and Rhoades pleaded guilty in Texas in 2012. Dane confirmed Walsh's identity by name in a 2016 interview.

=== Health ===
Around 2004, Dane suffered a serious health emergency. In a 2005 interview, he explained that he had been drinking heavily while unknowingly developing type 2 diabetes. According to Dane, doctors stated that his pancreas had begun auto-digesting; he nearly died and lost roughly two weeks of conscious memory during the episode. Following the hospitalization, his diabetes was treated with oral medication rather than insulin, and he reduced his sugar intake, sharply curtailed his alcohol consumption, and exercised regularly, resulting in substantial weight loss.

Dane's struggles with alcohol remained an ongoing factor throughout his life, contributing to interpersonal strains within Nevermore, which he later characterised as "the greatest band that alcohol ever ruined." In a 2016 interview, Dane acknowledged his reputation for drinking too much, though he stated that he drank considerably less by then and emphasised the importance of avoiding alcohol for vocal maintenance. His long-term health complications, including diabetes and alcohol abuse, continued to affect him during his final years leading up to his death in 2017.

== Death ==
On December 13, 2017, Dane died of a heart attack in São Paulo, Brazil, at the age of 56. At the time, he was residing in an apartment in the city while recording his second solo album, Shadow Work. On the evening of December 12, guitarist Johnny Moraes, who played in Dane's solo band and regularly assisted him with daily care, brought him dinner at the apartment. While lying in bed talking with Moraes, Dane suddenly fell silent; realising within moments that Dane was unresponsive and had stopped breathing, Moraes initiated cardiac massage while emergency services were summoned. Paramedics from Brazil's Mobile Emergency Care Service (SAMU) arrived within six minutes, but attempts to resuscitate him were unsuccessful, and he was pronounced dead.

In the weeks preceding his death, Dane had been experiencing a severe decline in physical health resulting from long-term struggles with type 2 diabetes and alcohol abuse. Just days before his death, Dane had tripped at a local supermarket and fractured his wrist, necessitating a hospital visit to treat the injury and stabilise his blood sugar. Despite his frailty, Dane had continued working in the studio; his vocal tracking for a metal-infused cover of The Cure's "The Hanging Garden" was the final recording session he completed. Approximately two weeks before his death, on November 30, 2017, Dane performed on the Brazilian music television program Showlivre, which was broadcast posthumously as his final filmed public performance.

Dane's death prompted an immediate outpouring of tributes from across the international heavy metal community, with fellow musicians, bandmates, and critics commemorating his unique vocal talents and poetic lyricism. On January 7, 2018, a public memorial celebration was held at Studio 7 in Seattle, organised by lifelong friends, peers from the Pacific Northwest metal scene, and family members, featuring musical tributes, shared personal anecdotes, and reflections on his artistic legacy.

== Legacy ==
Dane is widely regarded as one of the most distinctive and influential frontmen and lyricists in modern heavy metal, progressive metal, and thrash metal. Critics and fellow musicians have frequently praised his ability to blend technical power metal soaring vocals and four-octave operatic dynamics with the aggressive, down-tuned rhythms of technical thrash and death metal. Landmark records fronted and co-written by Dane - notably Sanctuary's Into the Mirror Black (1990) and Nevermore's Dreaming Neon Black (1999), Dead Heart in a Dead World (2000), and This Godless Endeavor (2005) - are frequently cited by music publications as benchmark releases in the evolution of progressive metal. Following his death, peers and critics noted that Dane's poetic, socially conscious, and philosophically challenging lyrics addressed themes, such as systemic corruption, religious dogma, mental illness, and technological overreach, that were remarkably ahead of their time.

On January 14, 2018, one month after Dane's death, Brazilian filmmaker Daney Carvalho released his debut short film, O Ano em que o Sol Morreu ("The Year the Sun Died", titled after the 2014 Sanctuary album), on YouTube as a drama and tribute to Dane. The short movie had originally been screened at a Brazilian film festival in May 2016; Dane had met Carvalho when the independent director interviewed him for a college broadcast in São Paulo, and after attending a private screening of the film, Dane praised it as "great" and described a pivotal scene as "terrifying." In December 2019, long-time bassist and collaborator Jim Sheppard announced The Dead Heart Collective, a creative and musical project founded to honour Dane's memory and serve as an artistic vehicle to channel songs and visual art inspired by him.

Following Dane's passing, his former bandmates made active efforts to preserve his musical legacy on stage. In 2018, Sanctuary fulfilled their previously scheduled tour dates across North America alongside Iced Earth as a tribute to Dane, enlisting Witherfall vocalist Joseph Michael to perform Dane's vocal parts, with guitarist Lenny Rutledge stating that Dane would have wanted his songs to continue being heard. Later, in late 2024 and 2025, founding Nevermore members Jeff Loomis and Van Williams announced plans to reactivate Nevermore to celebrate the band's catalog. In a joint open letter, Loomis and Williams emphasised that "no one can replace Warrel Dane" and stressed that their return was aimed at honouring the vocal melodies, stage charisma, and profound lyrical vision Dane had brought to the band, giving fans around the world an opportunity to celebrate his music.

== Discography ==
=== Serpent's Knight ===
- Released from the Crypt (2003, recorded in 1983-1985)
- Silent Knight... of Myth and Destiny (2010) – disc one vocals

=== Sanctuary ===
- Refuge Denied (1988)
- Into the Mirror Black (1990)
- Into the Mirror Live (1991)
- The Year the Sun Died (2014)
- Inception (2017)

=== Behemoth ===
- The Apostasy (2007) – guest vocals

=== Lady Catman ===
- Eyes Wide Open (2018) – guest vocals

=== Solo ===
- Praises to the War Machine (2008)
- Shadow Work (2018)

=== Shaded Enmity ===
- And Life Was Great.... (2013)

=== Nevermore ===
- Nevermore (1995)
- In Memory (EP, 1996)
- The Politics of Ecstasy (1996)
- Dreaming Neon Black (1999)
- Dead Heart in a Dead World (2000)
- Enemies of Reality (2003; remixed/remastered in 2005)
- This Godless Endeavor (2005)
- The Year of the Voyager (2008)
- The Obsidian Conspiracy (2010)
