= Throes of Absolution =

2012 studio album by 7 Horns 7 Eyes

Studio album by 7 Horns 7 Eyes
- Released: April 24, 2012
- Recorded: 2009–2010, 2012 (re-recorded)
- Genre: Christian metal; melodic death metal; progressive metal; technical death metal
- Label: Basick, Century Media
- Producer: Aaron Smith

7 Horns 7 Eyes chronology
Convalescence EP (2011)	Throes of Absolution (2012)

Throes of Absolution is the debut album by Christian death metal band 7 Horns 7 Eyes. This is the only album to feature Ryan Wood, who left to join Project 86. In the early process of writing this album, original vocalist Kyle Wood quit the band to be married, but is still featured as a composer.

== Critical reception ==
Professional ratings
Review scores
Source	Rating
Metal Underground	3.5/5 stars
Indie Vision Music	3.5/5 stars

No Clean Singing's reviewer states:"Powerful? Yes. Majestic? You bet your ass. One of the best of the year? Top shelf, grade-A, top-10-of-the-year list in the making. Buy this album. You won't regret it. 'Within the throes of absolution, I shed my humanity. I rise beyond angels to the company of saints.'"

Metal Underground writes:"Highs: These musicians are pros at their instruments, Jeff Loomis contributes guitar work, spats of keyboards enhance the atmosphere Lows: Songs are stretched out too long, some clean vocals could have better fit a few melodic sections

Bottom line: A good melodic death metal debut that shines with excellent guitar work, but falters with some pacing issues.

Altogether, Throes of Absolution is an album that always hints at greatness but never quite reaches it. For every moment that feels measured and well-constructed, there's another that comes across as superfluous or even uninspiring. However, in those glorious moments where everything lines up so perfectly, this band shows buckets of potential – more so than any new band I've heard this year. Mark my words, barring drastic line up changes or a nuclear apocalypse, the next 7 Horns 7 Eyes album will be spectacular. T.S. Elliot of Indie Vision Music wrote: "Overall: With Throes of Absolution, every member of 7 Horns 7 Eyes does his part to achieve the honorable, mouthful labeling of “progressive atmospheric technical death metal.” The drums, guitars, bass and death growls create a very distinct atmosphere that makes for a pleasant and refreshing listen. There's not as much vocal variation as I think the album deserves, but that's a miniature issue—Throes of Absolution is a musical masterpiece that was worth waiting for."

== Track listing ==
No.	Title	Length
1.	"Divine Amnesty"	6:34
2.	"Phumis: The Falsehood of Affliction"	4:46
3.	"The Hill Difficulty"	5:14
4.	"Cycle of Self"	6:05
5.	"Delusions"	5:30
6.	"A Finite Grasp of Infinite Disillusion"	5:45
7.	"Vindicator"	6:28
8.	"The Winnowing"	5:36
9.	"Regeneration" (featuring Jeff Loomis of Nevermore)	6:42
Total length:		52:40

== Credits ==
7 Horns 7 Eyes

- JJ Polachek – vocals
- Aaron Smith – rhythm guitar, producer, engineer, mixing, programming
- Sean Alf – lead guitar
- Brandon Smith – bass guitar
- Ryan Wood – drums, percussion

Additional musicians

- Jeff Loomis – guest guitar solo on track 9

Production

- Travis Smith – artwork, design concept
- Daniel Zetterstrom – photography
