= Monotheist (band) =

American death metal band

- Origin: Orlando, Florida U.S.
- Genres: Progressive death metal, Christian metal
- Years active: 2004–2009, 2012–present
- Labels: Shigionoth, Independent, Bombworks, SkyBurnsBlack
- Members: Mike "Prophet" Moore; Cooper Bates; Jose Figueroa; Tyler McDaniel; Chris Stropoli
- Past members: JJ "Shiv" Polachek; Elyssa Noel; Eirek Eichel; Isaac Kaplan; Xander Rodriguez; Anthony Wert; Jake Rice; Christian Martinez
- Website: Monotheist on Facebook

Monotheist is an American death metal band from Orlando, Florida. Former vocalist JJ Polachek is in the bands 7 Horns 7 Eyes and Ovid's Withering, of which, 7H7E, ranked their album on No. 1 on Metalsucks.com by Vince Neilsteins' Top 15 albums, and therefore stated that Monotheist is very similar to 7 Horns 7 Eyes. In 2016, the band released a demo, Scion of Darkness, for their debut album that was to be released in the summer of 2016 via SkyBurnsBlack Records.

The band released their debut studio album, Scourge, on March 16, 2018.

In January 2019, the band announced that Cooper Bates replaced Shiv on vocals, and Chris Stropoli joined on drums.

The band played at Prague Death Mass in 2023.

== Members ==
Current

- Cooper Bates – vocals (2019–present), drums (2012–2019)
- Mike "Prophet" Moore – guitars, vocals (2004–present)
- Jose Figueroa – bass (2013–present)
- Tyler McDaniel – guitars, vocals (2013–present)
- Chris Stropoli – drums (2019–present)

Past

- JJ "Shiv" Polachek VI – vocals (2008–2019)
- Elyssa Noel – bass, vocals (2004–2009)
- Eirek Eichel – drums (2004–2008)
- Isaac Kaplan – guitars
- Xander Rodriguez – guitars
- Anthony Wert – guitars, vocals (2008–2009)
- Jake Rice – vocals (2004–2008)
- Christian Martinez – guitars (2012–2013)

== Discography ==
Albums

- Scourge (2018)

Demos

- Unforsaken (2007)

EP

- Genesis of Perdition (2013)

Singles

- "Scion of Darkness" (2016)
