= Into the Mirror Live =

Into The Mirror Live / Black Reflections

Live album by Sanctuary
- Released: 1990
- Recorded: May 12, 1990
- Venue: The Country Club, Reseda, California
- Genre: Power metal, thrash metal
- Length: 29:46
- Producer: Howard Benson, Richard Kimball

Sanctuary chronology
Into the Mirror Black (1990)	Into The Mirror Live / Black Reflections (1990)	The Year the Sun Died (2014)

Into The Mirror Live / Black Reflections is a live promotional EP of the band Sanctuary Songs 2-6 were recorded on May 12, 1990, at The Country Club in Reseda, California, during their Into the Mirror Black tour .and Track 1 is from Sanctuary album Into the Mirror Black. Approximately 1,000 CD copies of this were made and less than 500 were ever distributed to radio stations and record stores. Because of contractual problems with Epic Records, the full version was never released for public consumption. Epic Records destroyed 500+ copies of this CD. Warrel Dane stated on several occasions that he owned the master tapes and copyrights of the full show, intending to have it finally released. Although the full show never emerged during Dane's lifetime, in 2020 it was finally announced that the show would be included, with a new mix, as a second CD on the 30th anniversary reissue of Into the Mirror Black. The original CD has been heavily pirated over the years as a 2-on-1 CD with the Satan's Host "Metal From Hell" album on the notorious Reborn Classics record label.

== Track listing ==
No.	Title	Writer(s)	Length
1.	"Future Tense" (Studio Version)	Warrel Dane, Lenny Rutledge, Sean Blosl, Jim Sheppard	5:06
2.	"Long Since Dark" (Live)	Dane, Rutledge	5:04
3.	"Battle Angels" (Live)	Blosl, Dane	4:38
4.	"One More Murder" (Live)	Dane, Rutledge	4:16
5.	"White Rabbit" (Live)	Grace Slick	5:38
6.	"Taste Revenge" (Live)	Dane, Rutledge	4:55

Track 1 is taken from the Sanctuary album Into the Mirror Black

== Personnel ==
=== Sanctuary ===
- Warrel Dane – vocals
- Lenny Rutledge – guitar
- Sean Blosl – guitar
- Jim Sheppard – bass
- Dave Budbill – drums

=== Technical personnel ===
- Howard Benson – production, mixing (1)
- Bruce Barns – mixing (1)
- Biff Daws – engineering (2–6)
- Mike Carver – assistant engineering (2–6)
- Doug Field – assistant recording (2–6)
- Phil Kneebone – assistant recording (2–6)
- Richard Kimball – executive production (2–6)
- Joe Gastwirt – digital mastering (2–6)
