= Uncertain Future =

Studio album by Forced Entry
- Released: June 30, 1989
- Recorded: January 1989
- Studio: London Bridge Studio, Seattle
- Genre: Thrash metal, technical thrash metal
- Length: 38:02
- Label: Combat Records
- Producer: Rick Parashar, Forced Entry

Forced Entry chronology
Uncertain Future (1989)	As Above, So Below (1991)

Uncertain Future is the debut album by American thrash metal band Forced Entry. It was released on June 30, 1989, on Combat Records.

Uncertain Future is known as one of the albums that established a distinctive thrash metal sound in the field of the music of Seattle. Musically, this album is a characteristic blend of thrash metal, speed metal, punk and progressive elements. These elements crystalized the "technical/progressive thrash" sound that Forced Entry would expand and improve on their next album As Above, So Below.

== Reception ==
Professional ratings
Review scores
Source	Rating
AllMusic	4.5/5 stars

AllMusic's John Book awarded the album four-and-a-half stars out of five, saying, "They changed the world of thrash with their debut album in 1989, featuring eerie power chords, awesome vocals, and a tremendous bass guitar sound. For an album recorded on a low budget, the sound is impressive. This album has yet to be appreciated by the masses."

== Track listing ==
All music is by Forced Entry. All lyrics are by Tony Benjamins, except track 6 (Brad Hull).

No.	Title	Length
1.	"Bludgeon"	4:34
2.	"Kaleidoscope of Pain"	4:20
3.	"A Look Through Glass"	4:06
4.	"Anaconda"	4:39
5.	"Octoclops"	4:57
6.	"Unrest They Find"	5:12
7.	"Morgulon"	5:12
8.	"Foreign Policy"	5:02

== Personnel ==
- Tony Benjamins – vocals, bass
- Brad Hull – guitar, vocals on track 6
- Colin Mattson – drums
