= As Above, So Below (Forced Entry album) =

Studio album by Forced Entry
- Released: June 14, 1991
- Recorded: December 1990
- Studio: Normandy Sound in Warren, Rhode Island
- Genres: Thrash metal, technical thrash metal
- Length: 45:09
- Label: Relativity Records
- Producer: Tom Soares

Forced Entry chronology
Uncertain Future (1989)	As Above, So Below (1991)	The Shore (1995)

As Above, So Below is the second and final full-length studio album by American thrash metal band Forced Entry. It was released on June 14, 1991, on Relativity Records, and re-issued in 2009 on Lost and Found Records. Music videos for "Macrocosm, Microcosm" and "Never A Know, But the No" were produced, the latter of which featured a cameo by members of Alice in Chains.

== Reception ==
Professional ratings
Review scores
Source	Rating
AllMusic	3/5 stars

AllMusic's Jason Anderson awarded the album three stars out of five, saying, "Musically similar to their earlier efforts, this 1991 Combat/Relativity records release boasts a punchier sound and slightly more technical material than prior efforts by the band. Brad Hull's guitar work is especially impressive, and his bandmates Collin Mattson (drums) and Tony Benjamins (bass and vocals) also deliver some creative and powerful performances of their own."

== Track listing ==
All tracks are written by Forced Entry.

No.	Title	Length
1.	"Bone Crackin' Fever"	5:52
2.	"Thunderhead"	4:11
3.	"Macrocosm, Microcosm"	4:33
4.	"Never a Know, But the No"	4:34
5.	"We're Dicks"	3:12
6.	"Apathy"	5:37
7.	"The Unextinguishable"	3:33
8.	"As of Yesterday"	5:18
9.	"When One Becomes Two"	5:27
10.	"How We Spent Our Summer Vacation"	2:52
Total length:		45:09

== Credits ==
- Tony Benjamins – vocals, bass
- Brad Hull – guitar, backing vocals, lead vocals on track 4
- Colin Mattson – drums
