= Praises to the War Machine =

Studio album by Warrel Dane
- Released: April 25, 2008
- Recorded: 2007 – 2008
- Genre: Progressive metal, thrash metal, gothic metal
- Length: 50:04
- Label: Century Media
- Producer: Peter Wichers

Warrel Dane chronology
Praises to the War Machine (2008)	Shadow Work (2018)

Professional ratings
Review scores
Source	Rating
Allmusic	3/5 stars

Praises to the War Machine is the debut solo release/album by heavy metal vocalist Warrel Dane from Nevermore, released on April 25, 2008. The album was produced by Peter Wichers, who was tapped by Dane to work on the album while Wichers was still a member of Soilwork. After leaving that band in 2007, Wichers co-wrote the album with Dane and played on eight of its tracks. Soilwork drummer Dirk Verbeuren and former Himsa guitarist Matt Wicklund also played on the album. Nevermore guitarist Jeff Loomis and James Murphy make guest appearances. Chris Broderick was supposed to contribute a solo to the track "Obey" but was unable to, due to other obligations. Praises to the War Machine includes two cover songs, The Sisters of Mercy's "Lucretia My Reflection" and "Patterns" by Paul Simon. Dane had previously covered a Simon song on Nevermore's album Dead Heart in a Dead World.

Dane was in the process of recording a follow-up to Praises to the War Machine at the time of his death in December 2017.

== Track listing ==
All songs by Warrel Dane and Peter Wichers except where indicated

1. "When We Pray" - 3:38
2. "Messenger" - 3:58
3. "Obey" - 3:14
4. "Lucretia My Reflection" (Andrew Eldritch) - 4:38 (Arranged by Wicklund)
5. "Let You Down" - 3:53
6. "August" - 3:48(Dane/Wicklund)
7. "Your Chosen Misery" 4:09
8. "The Day the Rats Went to War" - 3:37
9. "Brother" - 3:23
10. "Patterns" (Paul Simon) - 4:00 (Arranged by Wicklund)
11. "This Old Man" - 3:43
12. "Equilibrium" - 3:52 (Dane/Wicklund)
13. "Everything Is Fading" - 4:05 (Limited edition bonus track) (Dane/Wicklund)

== Credits ==
- Warrel Dane - vocals

=== Additional personnel ===
- Peter Wichers - guitar and bass (1–3, 5, 7–9 and 11), mixing
- Matt Wicklund - guitar and bass (4, 6, 10, 12 and 13)
- Jeff Loomis - guitar solo (2)
- James Murphy - guitar solo (8)
- Dirk Verbeuren - drums
- Mattias Nilsson - mixing
- UE Nastasi - mastering
- Travis Smith - album cover
