= Come Together Music Festival =

Australian music festival

Coordinates: 33°50′53.59″S 151°12′35.90″E

- A band on stage at the 2005 Come Together Music Festival
- Genre: Rock, heavy metal, punk
- Dates: June
- Location: Sydney, Australia
- Years active: 2005–present
- Website: Official Website

Come Together is an all-ages Australian music festival performed at Luna Park Sydney. Beginning in 2005, it was originally two separate events, one in April and one in September. In 2006, a two-day festival was held in June (on the Queen's Birthday Long Weekend), and the festival was again on the same long weekend in 2007. Originally limited to Australian performers, the festival was later expanded to include New Zealand performers and a small number of international acts.

The ticket price includes an unlimited rides pass and is for ages 13 and over.

Triple J and The Music have traditionally supported or presented the event alongside Luna Park Sydney.

From 2011 to 2013 the event changed to a one-day hip hop-centric event until 2014 when the event was cancelled one week before its 7 June date due to poor ticket sales.

Come Together 2015 has been announced for 6 and 7 June – returning to its original two-day format, reintroducing indie music to the Sunday. Triple J are supporting and The Music are presenting. Triple J Unearthed winners will open each day which feature all-Aussie line-ups of established and breaking acts.

== Notable past line-ups ==
2005 - April Little Birdy Rocket Science Gerling Sarah Blasko The Redsunband The Mess Hall The Presets Machine Translations Even Youth Group

2005 - September You Am I Butterfingers Dappled Cities Fly 78 Saab Peabody Screamfeeder Bluebottle Kiss Andy Clockwise Bluejuice + more

2006 Augie March Regurgiator The Herd Ratcat Magic Dirt The Mess Hall The Panics + more

2007 Every Time I Die Grinspoon Shihad Cog Karnivool Regular John + more

2008 The Vines British India Bridezilla The Holidays The Living End Gyroscope Birds of Tokyo Children Collide Dead Letter Circus The Getaway Plan Mammal + more

2009 Midnight Juggernauts Bliss & Eso Something With Numbers Art vs Science Wolf & Cub Red Riders Spod Cloud Control Philadelphia Gran Jury + more

2010 MM9 Bertie Blackman Horrorshow The Jezabels Boy & Bear The Snowdroppers Ernest Ellis + more

2011 Drapht Urthboy Illy The Tongue +more

2012 360 Horrorshow Hermitude Koolism Skryptcha +more

2013 The Herd Spit Syndicate Allday Jackie Onassis Crochet Crooks +more

2014... (cancelled)

=== 2015 ===
DAY 1 Seth Sentry Thundamentals Horrorshow REMI Coin Banks Ivan Ooze

DAY 2 Ball Park Music The Jungle Giants SAFIA Elizabeth Rose Montaigne Ecca Vandal
