= Into the Mirror Black =

Studio album by Sanctuary
- Released: February 27, 1990
- Recorded: 1989
- Studios: Steve Lawson Productions, Seattle, Washington
- Genres: Thrash metal, power metal
- Length: 46:37
- Label: Epic
- Producer: Howard Benson

Sanctuary chronology
Refuge Denied (1988)	Into the Mirror Black (1990)	Into the Mirror Live (1990)

Professional ratings
Review scores
Source	Rating
AllMusic	4.5/5 stars
Collector's Guide to Heavy Metal	8/10
Decibel	Favorable
Rock Hard	10/10
SLUG	Favorable

Into the Mirror Black is the second studio album by the band Sanctuary, released on February 27, 1990. It was their last album before their 18-year breakup from 1992 to 2010.

A video clip for the song "Future Tense" was made to promote the album. The video had some air play on MTV's Headbangers Ball. The album sold over 34,000 copies worldwide in its first week.

== Release ==
German metal label Century Media rereleased the album as 30th anniversary edition on October 9, 2020, on CD and vinyl. This edition contains three additional studio demos and a live album that was originally released in parts on the promotional EP Into The Mirror Live / Black Reflections. All tracks were remastered by American record producer Zeuss.

== Track listing ==
All tracks are written by Warrel Dane and Lenny Rutledge, except where noted.

No.	Title	Writer(s)	Length
1.	"Future Tense"	Dane, Rutledge, Sean Blosl, Jim Sheppard	5:08
2.	"Taste Revenge"		5:00
3.	"Long Since Dark"		5:04
4.	"Epitaph"		6:02
5.	"Eden Lies Obscured"		5:21
6.	"The Mirror Black"		5:07
7.	"Seasons of Destruction"		4:51
8.	"One More Murder"		4:21
9.	"Communion"	Dane, Blosl, Rutledge, Dave Budbill	5:37

Star Track Studio Session 1989
No.	Title	Writer(s)	Length
10.	"Future Tense"	Dane, Rutledge, Blosl, Sheppard	5:16
11.	"I Am Insane"		4:04
12.	"Mirror Black"		4:56

Black Reflections Revisited Live at the Country Club, Reseda, CA May 12th, 1990
No.	Title	Writer(s)	Length
1.	"Eden Lies Obscured"		5:15
2.	"Seasons of Destruction"		5:01
3.	"Die For My Sins"		4:05
4.	"Future Tense"	Dane, Rutledge, Blosl, Sheppard	5:15
5.	"White Rabbit"	Grace Slick	5:37
6.	"Taste Revenge"		5:09
7.	"Long Since Dark"		5:08
8.	"Sanctuary"		4:25
9.	"One More Murder"		4:13
10.	"Battle Angels"	Blosl, Dane	5:18
Total length:			49:26

== Personnel ==
Sanctuary

- Warrel Dane – vocals
- Lenny Rutledge – guitar
- Sean Blosl – guitar
- Jim Sheppard – bass
- Dave Budbill – drums, percussion

Technical

- Howard Benson – production, arrangement, mixing
- Bruce Barris – engineering, mixing
- Joe Barresi – assistant engineering
- Joel Zimmerman – art direction
- John Halpern – photography
- Gene Kirkland – band photos

== Charts ==
Chart performance for Into the Mirror Black
Chart (2020)	Peak position
German Albums (Offizielle Top 100)	97
