= Invictus Infinitum =

Studio album by Switchblade
- Released: 6 June 2009
- Recorded: August – November 2008
- Genres: Thrash metal, melodic death metal
- Length: 44:07
- Label: AmpHead Music
- Producers: Darren Jenkins, Neil Kernon and Switchblade

Switchblade chronology
The End of All Once Known (2005)	Invictus Infinitum (2009)

Invictus Infinitum is the second album by Australian melodic death metal band Switchblade. It was recorded and engineered by ex Cryogenic drummer Darren Jenkins at LA Studios, Sydney, mixed by Grammy Award-winning producer and engineer Neil Kernon in Chicago, USA, and mastered by Alan Douches in New Windsor, USA.

Invictus Infinitum was released in Australia and New Zealand on 6 June 2009 by AmpHead Music, and digitally released worldwide by New York-based digital distribution label The Orchard.

The album features a special guest guitar solo by Nevermore lead guitarist, Jeff Loomis on the track "Reflective Curse".

== Track listing ==
No.	Title	Length
1.	"II"	1:00
2.	"Revelation"	5:05
3.	"Coil of the Serpent"	5:02
4.	"The Cancer Benign"	6:05
5.	"Solitary Existence"	5:26
6.	"Reflective Curse"	5:32
7.	"Impure Design"	5:08
8.	"Lacerate"	4:52
9.	"As The Sun Dies"	6:52

== Personnel ==
- Adam Helmrich – vocals
- Andrew Najdek – guitar
- Anthony Delvecchio – guitar
- Mat Piccolotto – drums
- Gerard Dack – bass guitar

Sheri Tantawy – artwork, photography and design
