= Sanctuary (band) =

American metal band

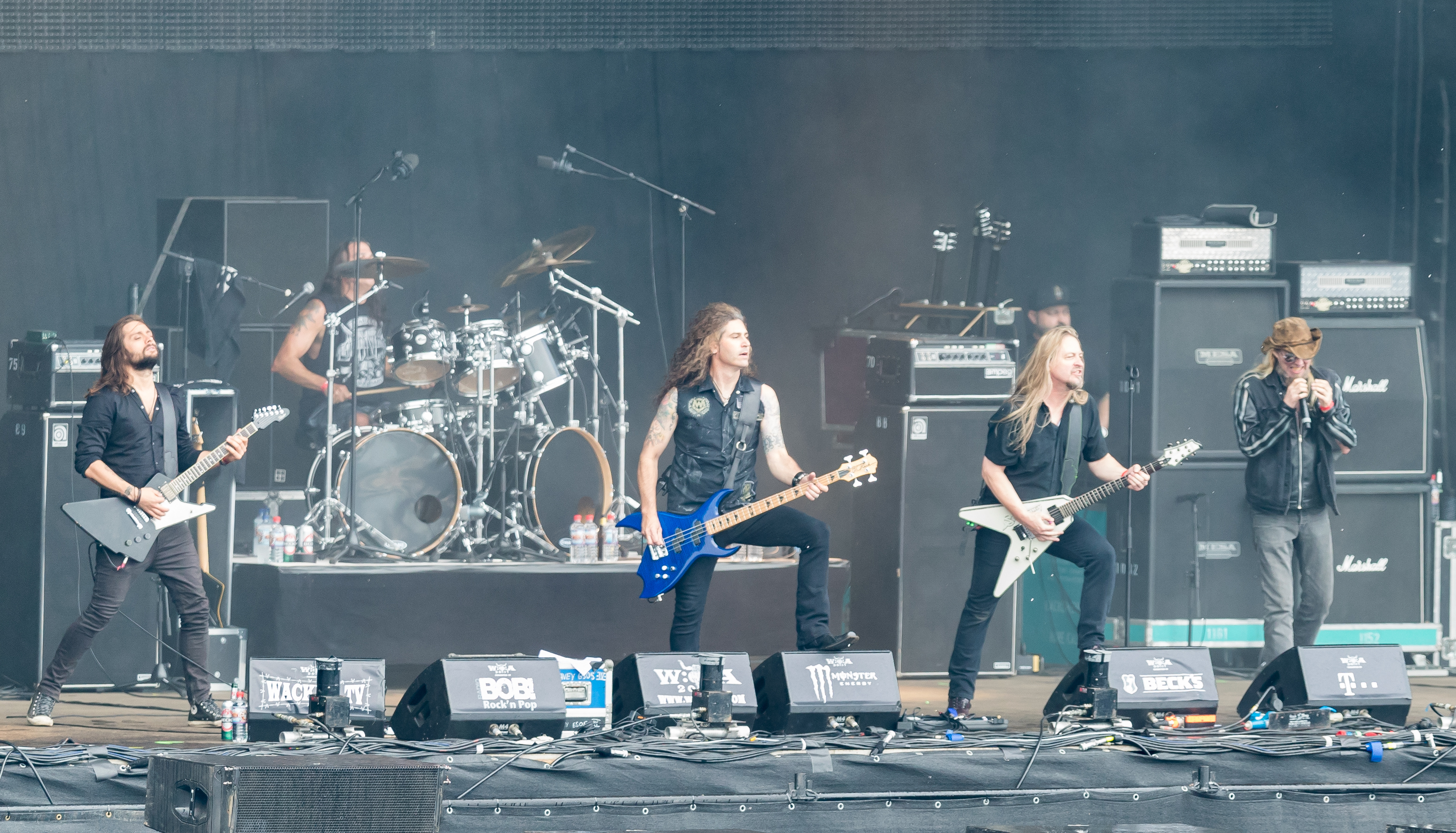
- Sanctuary at Wacken Open Air in Wacken, Germany, August 2017

Background information
- Origin: Seattle, Washington, U.S.
- Genres: Thrash metal; power metal
- Years active: 1985–1992, 2010–present
- Labels: Century Media; Epic
- Spinoffs: Nevermore
- Members: Lenny Rutledge; Dave Budbill; George Hernandez; Joseph Michael; Joey Concepcion
- Past members: Sean Blosl; Brad Hull; Jeff Loomis; Jim Sheppard; Nick Cordle; Warrel Dane; Attila Vörös

Sanctuary is an American heavy metal band, formed in 1985 in Seattle. The band broke up from 1992 to 2010. The band consists of Lenny Rutledge (guitar), Joseph Michael (vocals), George Hernandez (bass), and Dave Budbill (drums). The lead vocalist position was held by Warrel Dane until his death in 2017. They have released three studio albums and one live EP.

Despite never reaching mainstream success, Sanctuary is often credited for popularizing the 1980s and early 1990s Seattle hard rock and heavy metal scene, which spawned bands including Mother Love Bone, Alice in Chains, Soundgarden, Queensrÿche, Metal Church, Fifth Angel, TKO, Culprit, Rail, Forced Entry, and Q5.

== History ==
=== Formation and recruitment (1985) ===
Sanctuary formed in Seattle in 1985. Guitarists and cousins Lenny Rutledge and Sean Blosl began the project after previously playing in separate bands, gradually recruiting the remaining musicians. The band began playing covers and original songs until their line-up was complete. The established line-up comprised Rutledge, Blosl, vocalist Warrel Dane, bassist Jim Sheppard and drummer Dave Budbill.

According to Dane, Budbill repeatedly encouraged him to join. When Dane's existing band advertised for a drummer, Sanctuary's members answered the advertisement pretending to be applicants and asked to speak to the vocalist. Dane eventually agreed to audition. He took home a recording supplied by the band, wrote lyrics that evening and performed the song with the musicians the following day, securing his place. Lenny recalled that the composition became known as "Wally's Song".

After Dane joined, Sanctuary stopped playing covers and concentrated on original material. Rutledge associated the band's name with Dane's conception of an imagined place between heaven and hell, resembling purgatory.

=== Demos and early exposure (1986) ===
In 1986, Sanctuary recorded material at Triad Studios and Studio One in White Center. "Battle Angels" and "Soldiers of Steel" were recorded at Triad; the other recordings were made at Studio One, where the band encountered technical difficulties with the studio’s sixteen-track equipment.

The band’s demo received sustained airplay for a year on Seattle college radio station KCMU. Rutledge credited the station’s metal presenter Jeff Gilbert with supporting Sanctuary.

=== Mustaine, Refuge Denied, and the Epic deal (1986–1988) ===
Sanctuary attracted Dave Mustaine’s attention after Megadeth performed with King Diamond in Seattle in 1986. Rutledge approached Mustaine at his hotel and persuaded him to hear the band’s demo in a car. Mustaine offered to produce Sanctuary, and his manager, Keith Rawls, financed the recording and became the band’s manager.

The band recorded its debut album, Refuge Denied, at Steve Lawson’s Seattle studio in less than a month, working around Mustaine’s touring schedule. The material was recorded afresh rather than taken from the demo. Rawls subsequently secured an agreement with Epic Records, which had the completed album remixed before release in 1988.

The album combined melodic passages with faster, heavier material. Its lyrics drew on apocalyptic, religious and supernatural themes; Rutledge identified the film The Keep as the inspiration for “Soldiers of Steel”. It also included a heavier arrangement of Jefferson Airplane’s “White Rabbit”, featuring a guitar solo by Mustaine.

Dane later credited Mustaine with pushing him to deliver vocal performances beyond his expectations. However, in a 1991 interview, he expressed dissatisfaction with the debut’s production, contrasting it with the sound of the band’s second album.

Sanctuary then toured worldwide in support of the album, playing with bands including Megadeth, Warlock, Savatage, Testament, Nuclear Assault, Flotsam and Jetsam, Vio-lence, Fates Warning, Meliah Rage, and Forced Entry.

=== Into the Mirror Black and break-up (1989–1992) ===
In 1989, after the Refuge Denied tour ended, Sanctuary entered the studio to record their second studio album, Into the Mirror Black, which was released in 1990. A video clip for the song "Future Tense" was made and received some airplay on MTV's Headbangers Ball. While touring in support of the album (with bands including Fates Warning, Morbid Angel, Forbidden, Death Angel, Forced Entry and Blitzspeer), guitarist Sean Blosl left the band and was replaced by Jeff Loomis.

Shortly after, pressure from Epic Records to fit in with the flourishing Seattle grunge scene caused disagreements between band members regarding the band's musical direction. In 1992, Sanctuary officially disbanded. Epic Records was to release a full-length live recording from this final tour, but only a limited number of copies of a promotional live EP ever saw the light of day. It was named Into the Mirror Live. Refuge Denied and Into the Mirror Black were re-released as a double CD set by IronBird Records on February 22, 2010.

=== Post-breakup (1992–2010) ===
After disbanding, Warrel Dane, Jim Sheppard, and Jeff Loomis formed the band Nevermore in 1992. Lenny Rutledge became a musical producer and has his own studio. Additionally, he helped Nevermore on the demo sessions of their 1998 album, Dreaming Neon Black. Nevermore eventually went on hiatus in April 2011 after 19 years and seven studio albums.

=== Reunion and The Year the Sun Died (2010–2015) ===
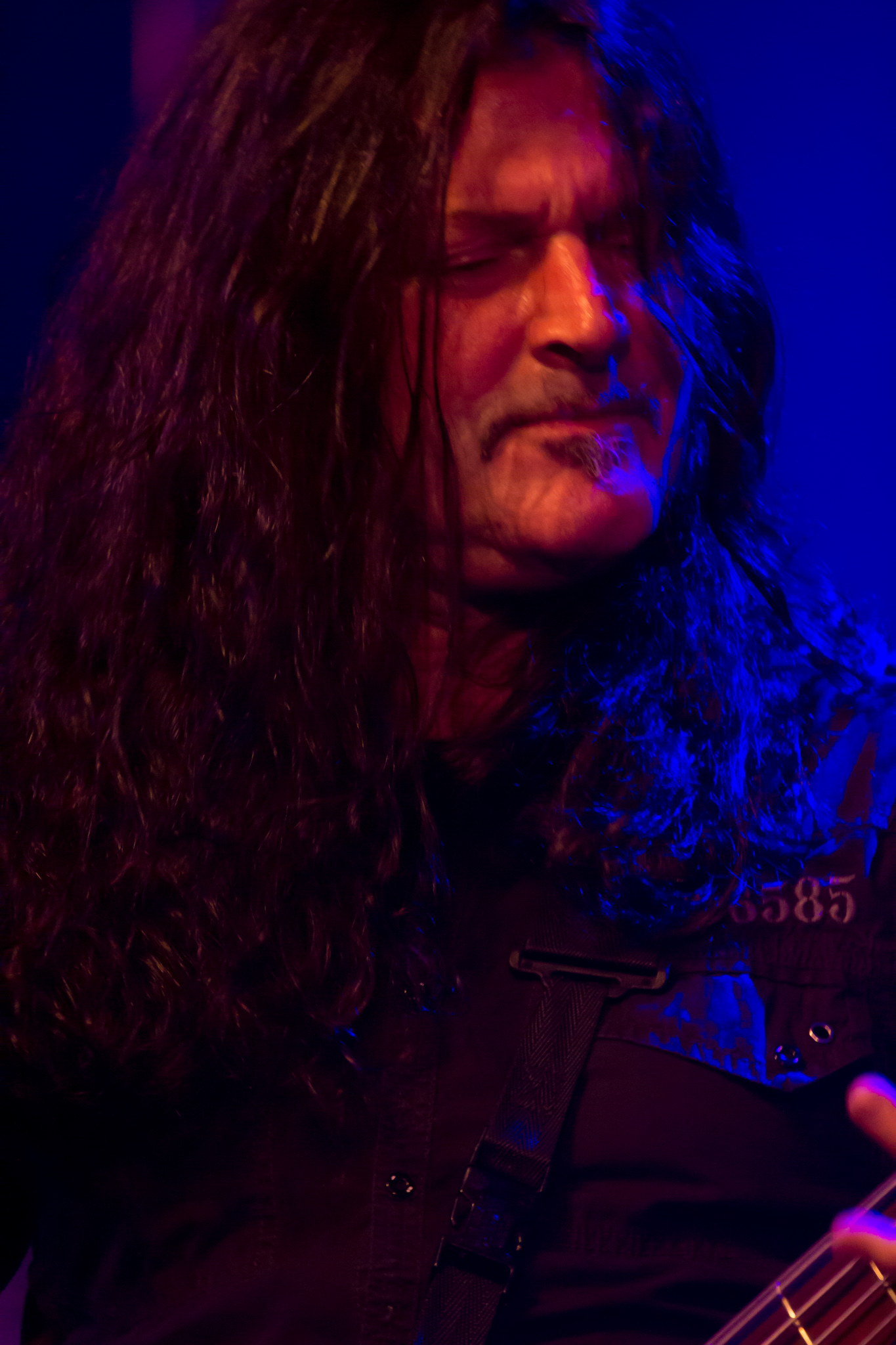
Jim Sheppard of Sanctuary at the concert ship Barge to Hell 2012

In 2010, four of the founding Sanctuary members — Warrel Dane, Jim Sheppard, Lenny Rutledge, and Dave Budbill—came together for a few select reunion performances. At first, it was just going to be a handful of shows, but the response and chemistry on stage was so overwhelming that they decided to reunite permanently. The band's first shows after included Jeff Loomis as a second guitarist, though he departed simultaneously to his departure from Nevermore. Former Forced Entry guitarist Brad Hull, who had earlier touring experience with the band, became a permanent member shortly after.

They had a concert at ProgPower USA in Atlanta on September 16, 2011. The band also played on the 70000 Tons of Metal festival on board Royal Caribbeans' Majesty of the Seas in January 2011 on the same date as Nevermore. In January 2013 Sanctuary got a deal with Century Media.

Regarding how the reunion came about, Dane told Rock My Monkey TV, "[Sanctuary guitarist Lenny Rutledge and I] always talked to each other, but never really been friends again... when the whole thing came about, that we were actually friends again, that's when we started talking more about doing it... it definitely wasn't because Nevermore was imploding... which it was, at that point... We all just started talking with each other again. That was kind of the groundwork for it... then we started saying, 'Well, gosh, let's make music again.' ... my God! Lenny is writing some stuff that is so friggin great! Obviously, he's been bottling this up for years, because he really hasn't been doing anything ... Well, he's had bands here and there. But he's really writing some great stuff that's really inspiring me, and making me fall in love with music again, with the creative process ... everything that revolves around that. Really inspiring me to write really evil lyrics."

On the topic of the sound of the comeback album, Dane said, "This record is not going to sound like the other two. It might sound very similar to the second one ('Into The Mirror Black'). It's definitely not going to sound like the first one, because we're all a little bit older and I can't come up with a c-clamp for a scrotum and a helium tank... It's not going to sound like the old ones... it's 2011. It's still gonna be that good, I think, and there's gonna be high-pitched screaming. I'm making sure of that. With Nevermore, high-pitched screaming was never really called for. You know, with Sanctuary... of course it is."

The band's third studio album, The Year the Sun Died, was finished in June 2014 and released on October 14 in North America and October 6 in Europe via Century Media. It was produced by Zeuss. The track listing was revealed in August 2014 and the album's artwork and a song "Arise and Purify" was made available. A lyric video for "Exitium (Anthem of the Living)" was released shortly thereafter, with the video for single "Frozen" debuting on October 7. Three songs on the album featured Dane's trademark high-pitched vocals, although the majority of the singing was more in line with the baritone and bass vocals which were featured prominently in Nevermore.

In February 2015, Brad Hull's departure was announced, with guitarist Nick Cordle, formerly of Arsis and Arch Enemy, filling in for March and April tour dates. Warrel Dane said the split with Brad Hull was due to "personal things that happened", that are better not to discuss in public, but said they are still friends. Zeuss [a.k.a. Chris Harris], their producer for "The Year the Sun Died", recruited Nick Cordle for the band when they found out Brad Hull would not be doing the European tour, since canceling the tour was not an option.

=== Dead Again and Inception (2015–2017) ===
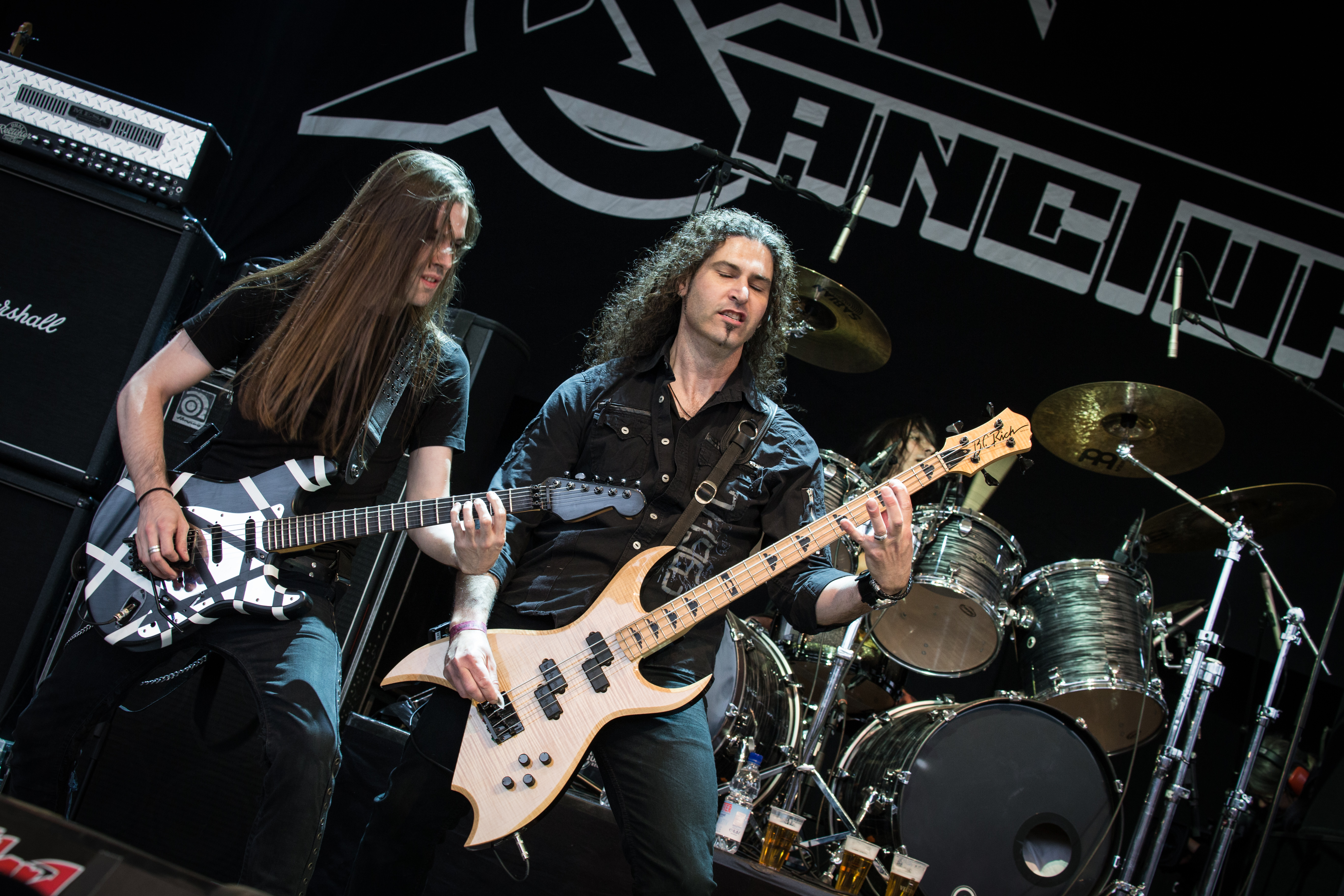
Sanctuary at the Rock Hard Festival in Gelsenkirchen, Germany, May 2015

Asked in October 2015 if Sanctuary had been writing new material for a fourth album, frontman Warrel Dane replied,

Lenny's gotta get off his butt and write some tunes for me, so I've got something to do in my bedroom when I'm alone with my computer and a microphone. He's got a bunch of riffs and some rough songs written. They're really, really good. It's the beginning stages of that. There was one song that got left off The Year The Sun Died. I don't remember why we didn't record it, but it just didn't get finished. It's kind of... It's really fast and really brutal. I'm pretty sure it's gonna make it on the next one. He's got a lot of really good s_ written... it's just a matter of putting it all together and having me work out all the vocal melodies and the lyrics and everything. It takes a little bit of time.

Pictures posted on the band's Facebook page on April 22, 2016, included a reference to ex-Panic bassist George Hernandez, who had filled in for Sheppard on tour the previous year, as the band's new permanent bassist.

In another interview by September 2016 Dane revealed Dead Again as a tentative title for the new album. He said that it would come "next year, but late next year". Dane described the material as "way faster and more like old-school thrash metal, but sounding a bit modern and it's __ heavy." He also announced the compilation of old demos and songs named Inception, which could arrive "in a few months".

=== Death of Warrel Dane and the future of the band (2017–present) ===
On December 13, 2017, it was reported that Dane had died of a heart attack in São Paulo, Brazil where he was recording his second solo album.

The band toured North America with Iced Earth in February and March 2018 for a tribute to Dane tour with Witherfall vocalist Joseph Michael filling in on vocals. Armageddon guitarist Joey Concepcion of Milford, Connecticut joined the tour on guitar. The tour was well-received, prompting Rutledge and Michael to begin working on demos to potentially continue the band.

Former guitarist Sean Blosl died in a traffic collision in Seattle, on August 26, 2024, at the age of 58.

== Members ==
Current members

- Lenny Rutledge – guitar (1985–1992, 2010–present)
- Dave Budbill – drums (1985–1992, 2010–present)
- George Hernandez – bass (2016–present; touring member: 2014–2016)
- Joseph Michael – vocals (2018–present)
- Will Wallner – guitar (touring member 2026–present)

Former members

- Warrel Dane – vocals (1985–1992, 2010–2017; his death)
- Jim Sheppard – bass (1985–1992, 2010–2016)
- Sean Blosl – guitar (1985–1990, died 2024)
- Jeff Loomis – guitar (1990–1992, 2010–2011)
- Brad Hull – guitar (2011–2015)
- Nick Cordle – guitar (2015–2016)
- Attila Vörös – guitar (2017, 2020)
- Joey Concepcion – guitar (2018–2020)

== Discography ==
=== Studio albums ===
List of studio albums, with selected details, peak chart positions and sales
Title	Album details	Peak chart positions							Sales
Title	Album details	US	AUT	BEL (FL)	BEL (WA)	GER	NLD	SWI	Sales
Refuge Denied	Released: 1988; Label: Epic; Formats: CD, LP, CS	—	—	—	—	—	—	—	
Into the Mirror Black	Released: February 27, 1990; Label: Epic; Formats: CD, LP, CS	—	97	—	—	—	—	—	
The Year the Sun Died	Released: October 6, 2014; Label: Century Media; Formats: CD, CD+LP, digital download	125	75	143	183	39	83	69	US: 3,000+

=== Live albums ===
List of live albums, with selected details
Title	Album details
Into the Mirror Live	Released: July 1990; Label: Epic; Formats: CD

=== Compilations ===
List of compilations, with selected details and peak chart positions
Title	Album details	Peak chart positions	
Title	Album details	BEL (WA)	GER
Inception	Released: February 24, 2017; Label: Century Media; Formats: CD, CD+LP	124	53
