= Refuge Denied =

Studio album by Sanctuary
- Released: April 26, 1988
- Studios: Steve Lawson Productions, Seattle, Washington
- Genres: Heavy metal; thrash metal; power metal
- Length: 39:35
- Label: Epic
- Producers: Dave Mustaine, Paul Lani

Sanctuary chronology
Refuge Denied (1988)	Into the Mirror Black (1990)

Professional ratings
Review scores
Source	Rating
AllMusic	3/5 stars
Billboard	Unfavorable
Collector's Guide to Heavy Metal	7/10
Rock Hard	9/10

Refuge Denied is the debut studio album by American heavy metal band Sanctuary, released on April 26, 1988 by Epic Records. It is considered to be an essential release in the thrash metal genre by Revolver.

== Background ==
After having recorded their first demo, guitarist Lenny Rutledge managed to establish contact with singer and guitarist Dave Mustaine after a show of his band, Megadeth. Mustaine expressed interest in the demo and in acting as producer. Mustaine's manager at the time, Keith Rawls, financed the recording and finally became Sanctuary's manager. Talks to a number of record labels led to the signing with Epic Records.

== Release ==
The song "Battle Angels" was used in the 2009 video game Brütal Legend.

The album was re-released in 2010 together with successor album Into the Mirror Black as double CD by reissue label IronBird via Cherry Red Records.

The song “Battle Angels” was featured in the fourth episode of the first season of the Netflix series, The OA, "Away".

== Track listing ==
All tracks are written by Warrel Dane and Lenny Rutledge, except where noted.

Side one
No.	Title	Writer(s)	Length
1.	"Battle Angels"	Sean Blosl, Warrel Dane	4:52
2.	"Termination Force"	Lenny Rutledge, Dane, Jim Sheppard	3:40
3.	"Die for My Sins"		3:42
4.	"Soldiers of Steel"		5:30

Side two
No.	Title	Writer(s)	Length
5.	"Sanctuary"		3:57
6.	"White Rabbit" (Jefferson Airplane cover)	Grace Slick	3:10
7.	"Ascension to Destiny"		4:57
8.	"The Third War"		3:52
9.	"Veil of Disguise"		5:55

== Personnel ==
Sanctuary

- Warrel Dane – vocals
- Lenny Rutledge – guitar, backing vocals
- Sean Blosl – guitar, backing vocals
- Jim Sheppard – bass
- Dave Budbill – drums, backing vocals

Additional musicians

- Dave Mustaine – backing vocals, guitar solo on track 6, production
- James Overaa (credited as James Overa) – backing vocals
- Rich Furtner – backing vocals

Technical

- Paul Lani – production on track 6, mixing
- Terry Date – engineering
- Mike Amstadt – assistant engineering
- Don Grierson – executive production
- Lynn DeBon – photography
- Ed Repka – cover art
