= Jeff Loomis =

American guitarist (born 1971)

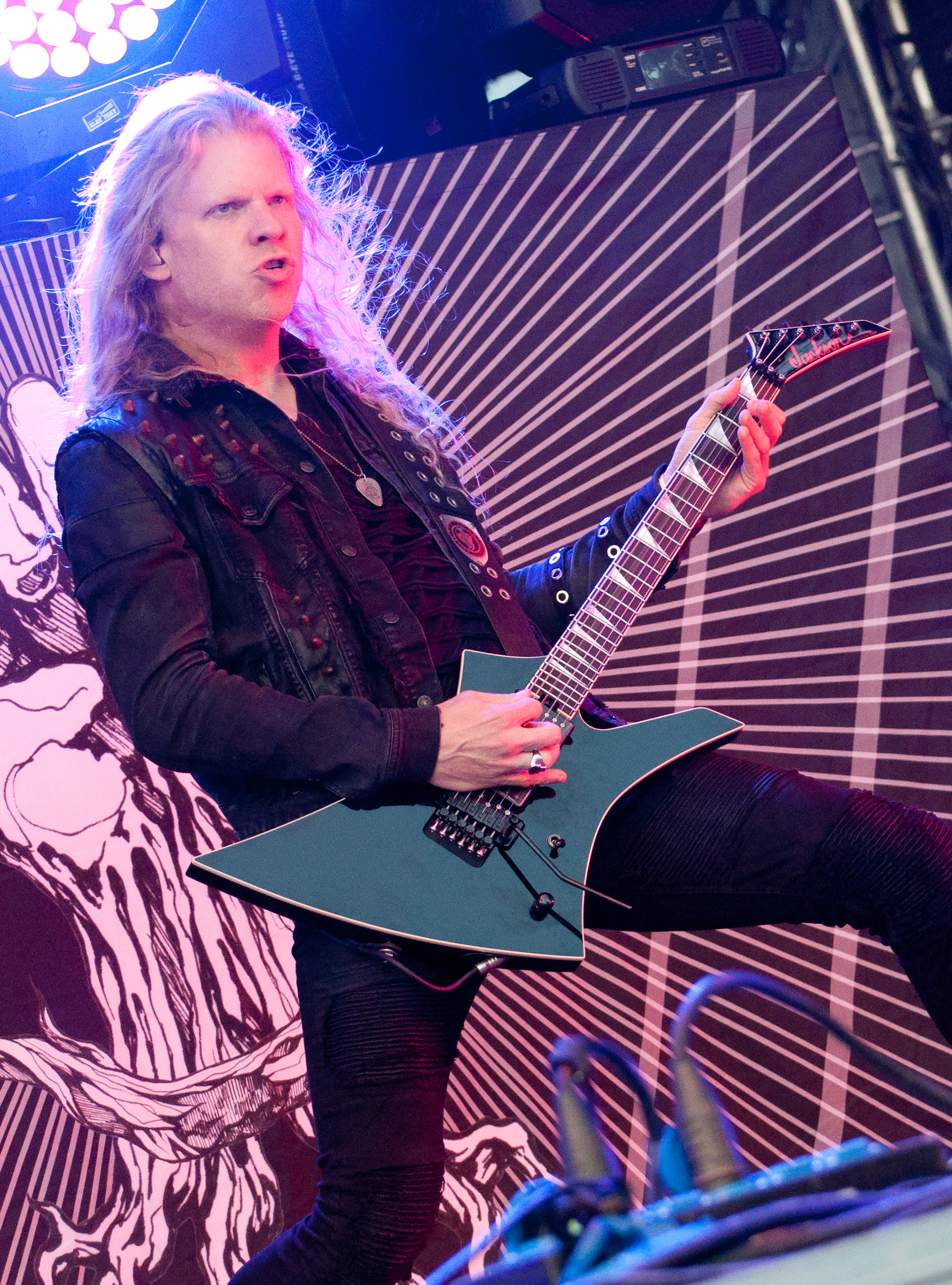
- Loomis performing with Arch Enemy, 2018

Background information
- Born: September 14, 1971 (age 55); Appleton, Wisconsin, U.S.
- Genres: Progressive metal, melodic death metal, thrash metal, groove metal, neoclassical metal, death metal, instrumental rock, black metal
- Occupations: Musician, songwriter
- Instrument: Guitar
- Years active: 1987–present

Jeff Loomis (born September 14, 1971) is an American musician, best known for his role as lead guitarist in the progressive metal band Nevermore as well as brief tenures in its precursor, Sanctuary. In 2014, he joined Swedish melodic death metal band Arch Enemy, and in 2021 he joined Graham Bonnet's Alcatrazz as well. He left Arch Enemy in 2023. As a solo artist he has released two albums and one EP.

== Biography ==
=== Early days ===
Loomis got his first instrument at nine or ten years old but did not start practicing seriously until around the age of 15. As a teenager in Wisconsin he played in a handful of cover bands and three death metal bands before joining more established bands. At the age of 16, Loomis won Wisconsin's Guitar Wars contest.

He auditioned for Megadeth (during the So Far, So Good...So What! era) at the age of 16 after their lead guitarist Jeff Young was fired from the band. After they played a few songs together, Dave Mustaine, the band's frontman and other lead guitarist, thanked Loomis and told him that one day he would become a great guitar player but because of his age he was not right for the position. Loomis saw Cacophony on tour and told Marty Friedman, who became very interested, about the audition. Marty tried out for the position and joined the band in 1989. In 2005, Loomis would then share the stage with Megadeth as the lead guitarist for Nevermore as part of Mustaine's Gigantour festival. Loomis began to work on his solo album Zero Order Phase. At this time Megadeth were having tryouts for a new guitarist once again and invited Loomis to join them. He turned the band down in order to keep working on his solo album. Coincidentally, Loomis's co-guitarist in Nevermore, Chris Broderick, auditioned for Megadeth and was given the job.

=== Sanctuary (1990–1991) ===
Not too long after being auditioned for the lead part in Megadeth (which was also auditioned for by Steve Smyth and Chris Broderick, both playing for his later band Nevermore at different points), Loomis was unable to join the band Sanctuary after guitarist Sean Blosl had left. He was able to take his place at this time; however, because of a dispute caused by guitarist Lenny Rutledge wanting to make grunge oriented music, Sanctuary broke up four months afterwards.

=== Nevermore (1991–2011) ===
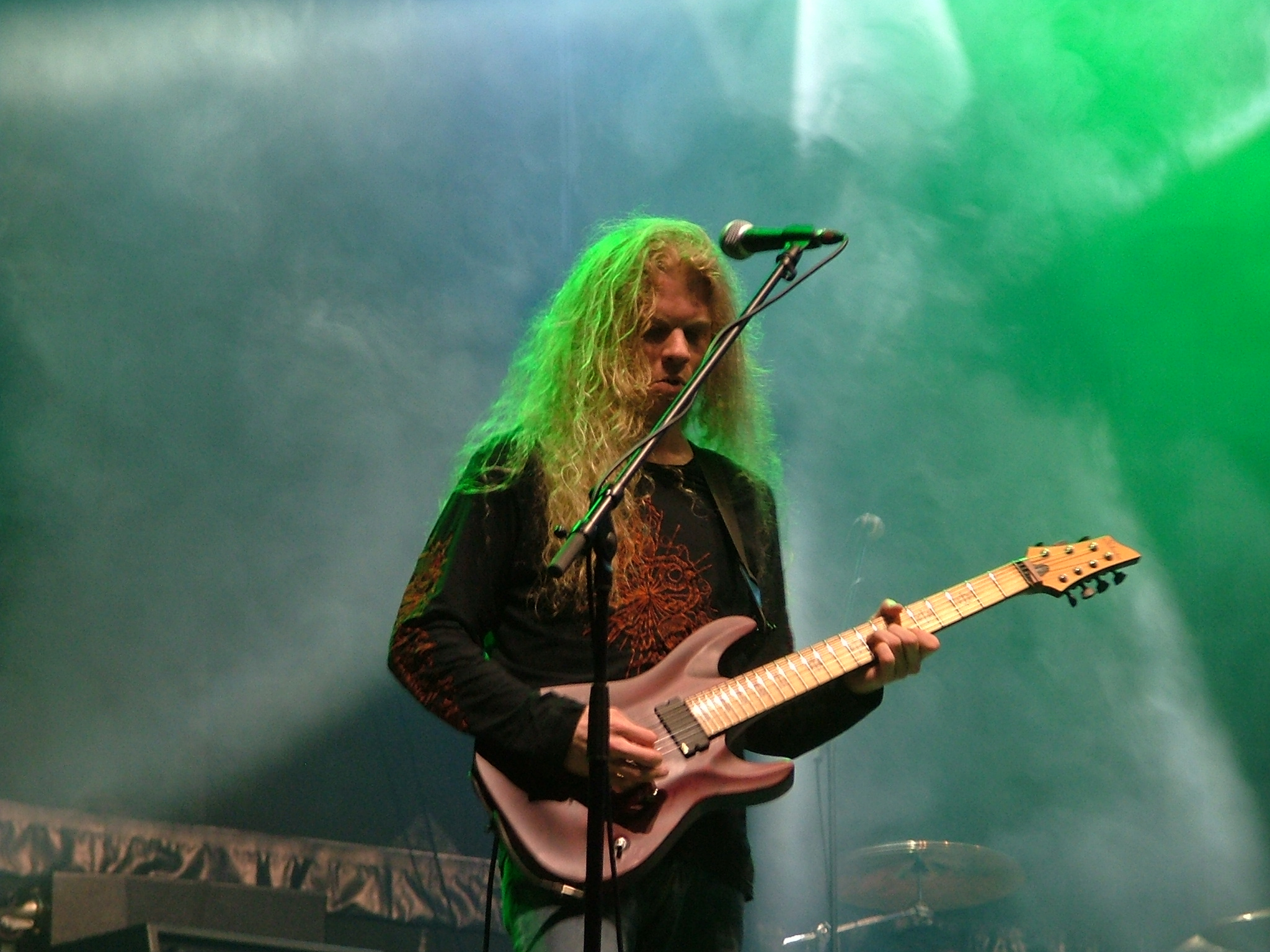
Loomis with Nevermore in 2007

After the break-up, Loomis and former Sanctuary members Warrel Dane (vocalist) and Jim Sheppard (bassist) made plans to form Nevermore, and in late 1994, Loomis became the lead guitarist of Nevermore after the brief period being in Sanctuary. During his time in the band he was the main songwriter of Nevermore. His contributions can be found in albums such as The Politics of Ecstasy, Dreaming Neon Black, This Godless Endeavor (including Steve Smyth, who previously featured in the band Testament) and Nevermore's 2010 album, The Obsidian Conspiracy. Loomis played an important role in developing the sound that Nevermore has today, using 7-string guitars and techniques such as sweep picking. One of his more important musical showcases is the critically acclaimed album Dead Heart in a Dead World, for which he wrote most of the songs before Nevermore. On April 21, 2011, he and drummer Van Williams left Nevermore, citing personal and musical differences with Warrel Dane.

=== Solo, Arch Enemy and other projects (2005–2023) ===
In 2005, Loomis reported that he would take some time as a break and then begin recording a solo album. He said, "It's something I've been wanting to do for some time ... It will be like a Jason Becker/Marty Friedman kind of thing." On April 1, 2008, Loomis said that all 10 songs which had been written had had the drum parts recorded (done by Mark Arrington pretty much overnight) and they would soon begin tracking the rhythm guitar. On July 3, 2008, it was announced that the album would be called Zero Order Phase. It was released September 30 via Century Media Records. It features guest solos from Ron Jarzombek, Pat O'Brien, and bassist Michael Manring. During this time Dave Mustaine of Megadeth invited Loomis to join as the lead guitarist, but he declined the offer to work on his solo record.

In 2010, he played a guest guitar solo on Keith Merrow's album Awaken the Stone King, released on January 1, 2011. He also played another guest solo in the song "Racecar" on Periphery's self-titled debut album.

On April 10, 2012, Loomis released his second solo album Plains of Oblivion through Century Media Records. Marty Friedman, Tony MacAlpine and Chris Poland performed guest solos on the record.

In summer 2012, Loomis embarked on a North American tour with The Contortionist, Chimp Spanner, and 7 Horns 7 Eyes.

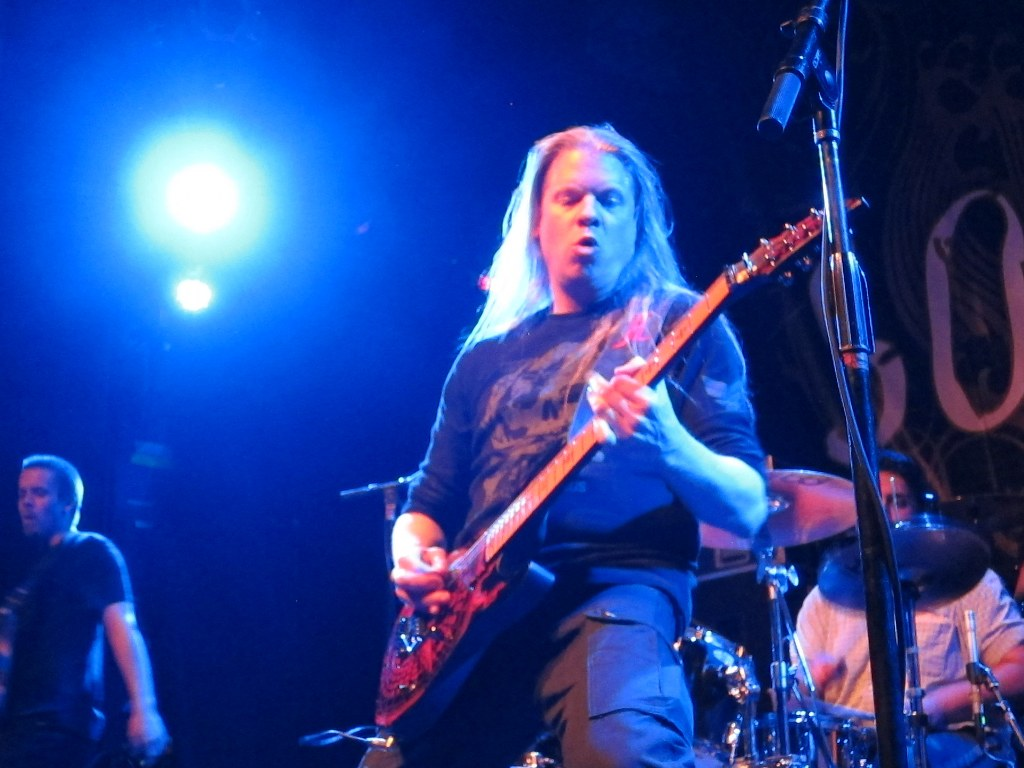
Loomis supporting Soilwork in 2013

In 2013, Loomis started touring with melodic death metal band Soilwork.

It was announced in July 2013, that Loomis would be teaming up with Keith Merrow, Alex Webster of Cannibal Corpse, and Alex Rüdinger of The Faceless to record an instrumental album titled Conquering Dystopia, the recording of which will be funded by donations.

On November 17, 2014, Loomis was announced as the new guitarist of melodic death metal band Arch Enemy, replacing Nick Cordle. His first show with them was on November 26 in Lyon, France, when War Eternal European tour kicked off.

In 2017, Arch Enemy vocalist Alissa White-Gluz announced she was collaborating with Loomis for her upcoming solo record.

In January 2019, Loomis said he had been working on material for an upcoming third solo album.

In June 2021, Graham Bonnet released a statement on Facebook that Loomis had joined Graham Bonnet's Alcatrazz.

On December 30, 2023, Arch Enemy made a post on their Instagram account, stating that they had amicably parted ways with Loomis.

=== Nevermore re-formation (2024–present) ===
In December 2024, Loomis and Van Williams stated that they planned to re-form Nevermore. In February 2026, they announced the new lineup, with themselves alongside guitarist Jack Cattoi, bassist Semir Özerkan, and vocalist Berzan Önen.

=== Instructional and voice work ===
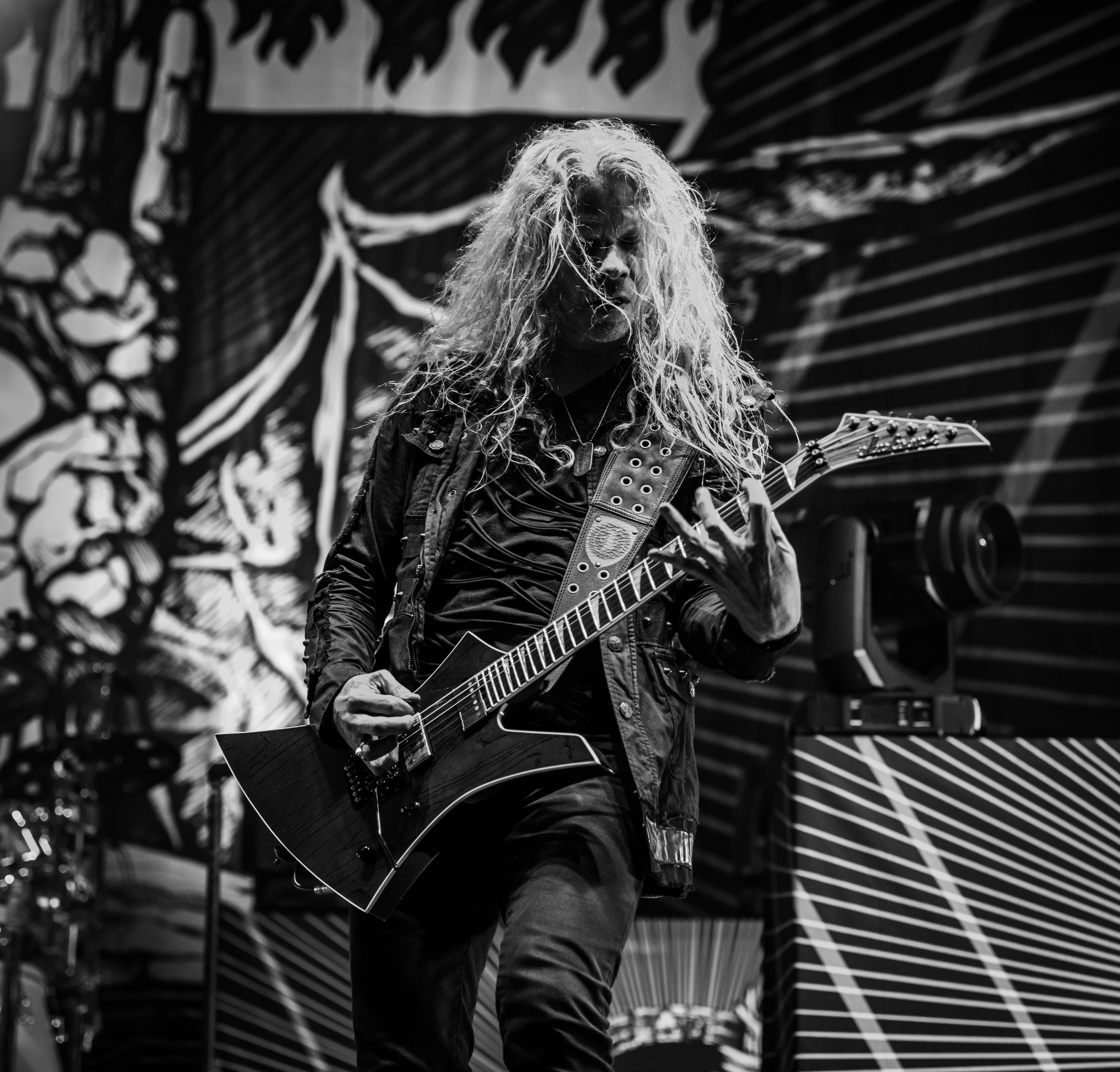
Loomis performing with Arch Enemy at Rock am Ring in 2019

Loomis had a monthly column in Guitar World magazine titled "Merchant of Menace", where he explained how to play the riffs and solos of Nevermore. In more recent columns, his former co-guitarist in Nevermore, Steve Smyth has co-written the column, which is dubbed "The Merchants of Menace". He has also been featured in Young Guitar Magazine, showing guitarists how to play and explain his style and signature guitar in Nevermore.

In 2006, he provided the voice of Murderface's father in Metalocalypse on Adult Swim.

In 2009, Guitar World released Loomis's first instructional video.

Slated for a late 2010 release, Loomis has recorded a two-part instructional DVD series with RockHouseMethod. Recording took place late fall of 2009.

== Musical style and influences ==
Guitarists whose style influenced Loomis are Yngwie Malmsteen, Marty Friedman, Jason Becker, Eddie Van Halen, Randy Rhoads and Brian May.

== Equipment ==
Loomis plays various Schecter seven (and occasionally six) string guitars, including the Jeff Loomis C7 FR Signature Model with EMG 707 pickups and a Floyd Rose tremolo. He also plays a Schecter C-7 Hellraiser with EMG 707 active humbucker pickups, and the C-7 Blackjack with the Seymour Duncan Blackout pickups. Prior to Schecter he played a wide variety of guitars including Ibanez (Politics of Ecstasy period), Gibson, Jackson (Dreaming Neon Black period), ESP (Dead Heart... period), and Warmoth. In the video for "Believe in Nothing" he can be seen using an ESP LTD H-307. He also owns a custom ESP Horizon 7. He endorsed Peavey amplifiers and used their XXX head. After that he endorsed Krank amplifiers and could be seen live using the Krankenstein heads and cabs. As of 2008 Loomis endorsed Engl Amplification and used most of their heads at one time or another, most notably the SE 670, then the Fireball then their Savage heads and then the Engl Special Edition E570 Rack-mounted Preamp with Engl 100W Stereo Poweramp.and Engl cabs loaded with Vintage 30s. Early in 2007, Schecter guitars brought out the Jeff Loomis Signature Schecter 7-string, based on the C-7 Hellraiser model. It features the EMG 707 active pickups, ash body in 'vampyre red satin' and three piece maple neck with maple fretboard and Sperzel locking tuners. At NAMM 08 a new signature model was released. It is the same as his other one but it has a fixed bridge instead of a Floyd Rose. Loomis can also been seen on YouTube playing an electro acoustic LAG Tramontane T100 ASCEBLK.

In January 2014, Schecter announced that the Loomis series had undergone a redesign. They now feature EMG 57-7H and 66-7H active-housed pickups, all-black hardware, a thinner body with a deeper archop, a thinner, un-tinted neck, repositioned volume and toggle controls, stainless steel frets, and the options of either a Hipshot hard-tail bridge (JL-7), instead of the previous TonePros Tune-O-Matic bridge, or a Floyd Rose floating bridge (JL-7FR). The neck was also repositioned for better upper-fret access. It is available in either vampyre red satin or gloss black. and for case on JLFR7 use Schecters SGR1C hard shell case. In 2016, the guitars began featuring Loomis's signature Seymour Duncan active pickups.

As of March 2018 Loomis has left Schecter stating more freedom to play other guitars in his collection, notably Les Pauls and Strats. In December 2018, he became a Jackson endorsed artist and is under development of a signature model to be released in January 2019.

Loomis uses Ernie Ball strings. His current gauge 9-46+62 in B♭ tuning, he used to use a heavier 10–52 (skinny top, heavy bottom) + 70 gauge along with Dunlop Tortex 1.5 mm Sharp picks. For amplification he is currently using the Line6 Helix rack with Seymour Duncan PowerStage 700.

Effects pedals

- Maxon 808
- MXR Stereo Chorus
- Way Huge Electronics Green Rhino Mk II
- Morley Dragon Wah
- Horizon Devices: Precision Drive

Recording gear

- ENGL Amps – Engl Savage 120 head. Also E670.
- Digidesign 002 Rack Pro Tools unit
- Korg Padkontrol
- Apple Macbook Pro
- Apogee Quartet interface
- Two Notes Torpedo Studio (load box and amp interface)
- Event Opal Studio Monitors
- Line 6 Helix
- Kemper Profiler

== Discography ==
=== Nevermore ===
- Nevermore (1995)
- In Memory (EP, 1996)
- The Politics of Ecstasy (1996)
- Dreaming Neon Black (1999)
- Dead Heart in a Dead World (2000)
- Enemies of Reality (2003, remixed in 2005)
- This Godless Endeavor (2005)
- The Year of the Voyager (2008)
- The Obsidian Conspiracy (2010)

=== Arch Enemy ===
- Stolen Life (EP, 2015)
- As The Stages Burn! (2017)
- Will to Power (2017)
- Deceivers (2022)

=== Solo ===
- Zero Order Phase (2008)
- Plains of Oblivion (2012)
- Requiem for the Living (EP, 2013)

=== Conquering Dystopia ===
- Conquering Dystopia (2014)

=== Guest appearances ===
- Rorschach Test – Peace Minus One (2000)
- God Forbid – Gone Forever (2004)
- Pamela Moore – Stories from a Blue Room (2006)
- Annihilator – Metal (2007)
- Warrel Dane – Praises to the War Machine (2008)
- Marty Friedman – Future Addict (2008)
- Switchblade – Invictus Infinitum (2009)
- Tim "Ripper" Owens – Play My Game (2009)
- Periphery – Periphery (2010)
- Pale Gray Sky – Everything for Nothing (2010)
- Keith Merrow – Heart of the Sea Nymph (2011)
- Glen Drover – Metalusion, (2011)
- Single Bullet Theory – IV, (2011)
- Keith Merrow – Spice-Dealer (2012)
- Stéphan Forté – The Shadows Compendium (2011)
- 7 Horns 7 Eyes – Throes of Absolution (2012)
- Leander – Szívidomár (2012)
- Ihsahn – Eremita (2012)
- Tuff – What Comes Around Goes Around Again (2012)
- David Maxim Micic – Bilo 3.0 (2013)
- Hannes Grossmann – The Radial Covenant (2014)
- Helstar – This Wicked Nest (2014)
- Tony MacAlpine – Concrete Gardens (2015)
- Abnornmal Thought Patterns – Altered States of Consciousness (2015)
- Jason Richardson – I (2016)
- Rob Scallon – The Scene Is Dead (2017)
- Scale the Summit - "In a World of Fear" (2017)
- Lady Catman - Eyes Wide Open(2018)
- Jason Becker - Triumphant Hearts (2018)
- Silver Talon - Battle Angels (2018)
- Andy Gillion - Skyless (2019)
- Michael Sweet - Ten (2019)
- Amaranthe - Do or Die (2020)
- Binary Code - Memento Mori (2020)
- Ola Englund - Starzinger (2021)
- Alissa - TBA (2021)
- The Home Team - Slow Bloom (2021)
- Graham Bonnet Band - Day Out in Nowhere (2022)
- Kvaen - The Great Below (2022)
- Joey Concepcion - Divine Technical Machine (2023)

== Videography ==
- Super Shred – Guitar World
- Extreme Lead Guitar: Dissonant Scales & Arpeggios (The Rock House Method)
