= Judas Priest discography =

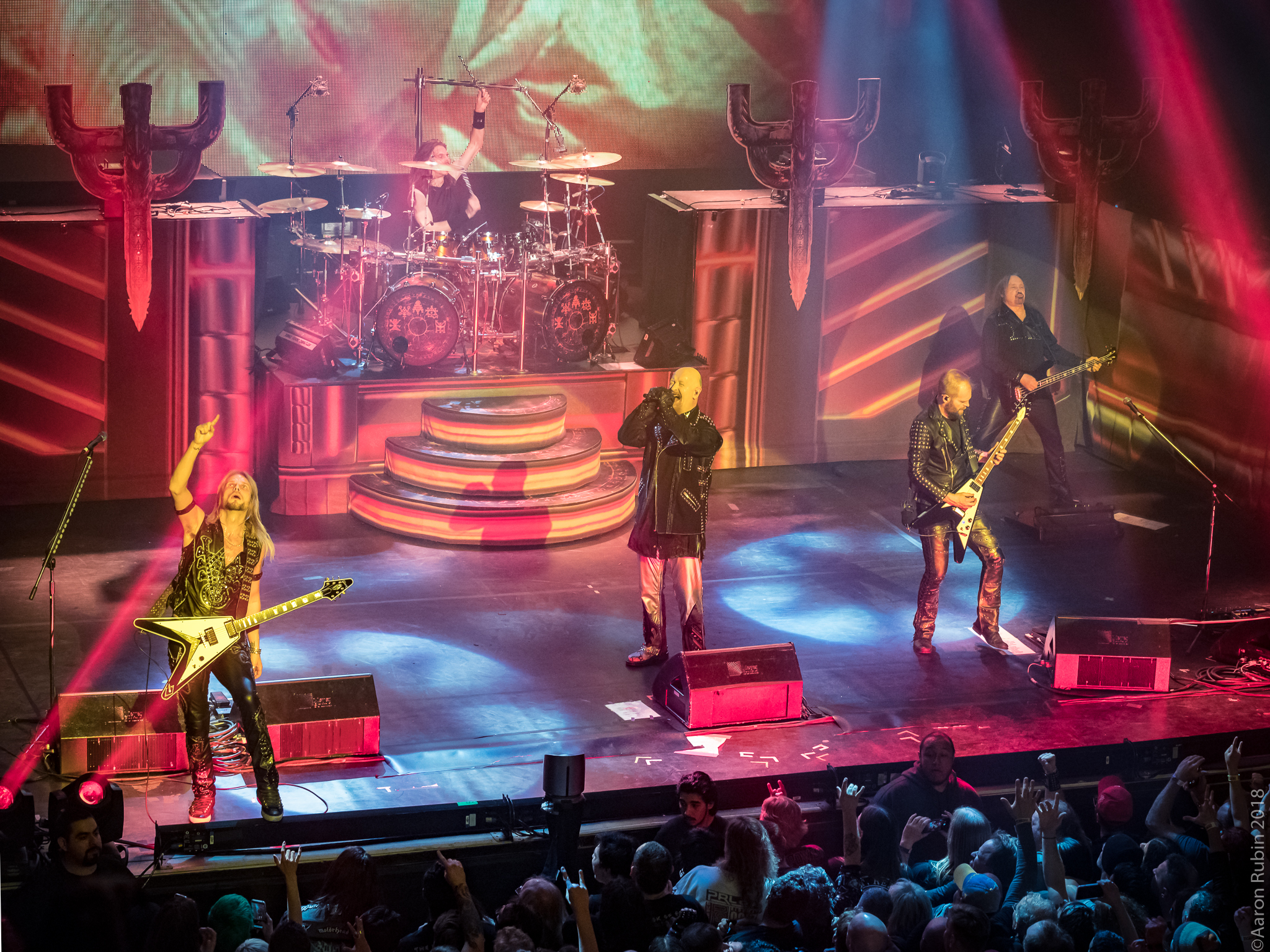
- Judas Priest performing at the Warfield Theater in 2018
- Studio albums: 19
- Live albums: 6
- Compilation albums: 7
- Tribute albums: 4
- Singles: 30
- Video albums: 10
- Music videos: 22

English heavy metal band Judas Priest have released 19 studio albums, six live albums, seven compilation albums, 29 singles, 10 video albums, and 21 music videos. The band currently consists of drummer Scott Travis, singer Rob Halford, and guitarists Glenn Tipton and Richie Faulkner. After guitarist K. K. Downing's retirement from the band in 2011, bassist Ian Hill was the only remaining founding member until he retired in October 2026. Judas Priest have sold over 50 million albums worldwide, with 12 million copies in the United States.

== Albums ==
=== Studio albums ===
Year	Album details	Peak chart positions										Certifications (sales thresholds)
Year	Album details	UK	AUS	CAN	FRA	GER	NOR	SPA	SWE	SWI	US	Certifications (sales thresholds)
1974	Rocka Rolla: Released: 6 September 1974; Label: Gull (#1005); Format: CS, LP, 8-track	—	—	—	—	—	—	—	—	—	—	
1976	Sad Wings of Destiny: Released: 26 March 1976; Label: Gull (#1015); Format: CD, CS, LP, 8-track	—	—	—	—	—	—	—	—	—	—	
1977	Sin After Sin: Released: 8 April 1977; Label: Columbia (#82008); Format: CS, LP, 8-track	23	—	—	—	—	—	—	49	—	—	RIAA: Gold
1978	Stained Class: Released: 10 February 1978; Label: Columbia (#82430); Format: CS, LP, 8-track	27	—	—	—	—	—	—	—	—	173	RIAA: Gold
1978	Killing Machine (released in the US as Hell Bent for Leather in February 1979): Released: 3 November 1978; Label: Columbia (#83135); Format: CS, LP, 8-track	32	—	—	—	—	—	—	—	—	128	MC: Platinum; RIAA: Gold
1980	British Steel: Released: 11 April 1980; Label: Columbia (#84160); Format: CS, LP, CD+DVD, 8-track	4	—	45	—	59	21	55	20	92	34	BPI: Silver; MC: Gold; RIAA: Platinum; SWE: Gold
1981	Point of Entry: Released: 27 February 1981; Label: Columbia (#84834); Format: CS, LP, 8-track	14	—	42	—	19	32	—	14	—	39	BPI: Silver; RIAA: Gold
1982	Screaming for Vengeance: Released: 1 July 1982; Label: Columbia (#85941); Format: CS, LP, CD+DVD, 8-track	11	81	17	—	23	26	84	12	—	17	MC: Platinum; RIAA: 2× Platinum; SWE: Gold
1984	Defenders of the Faith: Released: 13 January 1984; Label: Columbia (#25713); Format: CD, CS, LP, 8-track (record club only release)	19	—	17	142	21	17	—	2	12	18	MC: Platinum; JPN: Gold; RIAA: Platinum; SPA: Gold
1986	Turbo: Released: 7 April 1986; Label: Columbia (#26641); Format: CD, CS, LP	33	56	37	162	28	13	—	10	2	17	MC: Platinum; SPA: Gold; RIAA: Platinum
1988	Ram It Down: Released: 13 May 1988; Label: Columbia (#44244); Format: CD, CS, LP	24	43	30	—	9	5	—	5	8	31	MC: Gold; RIAA: Gold
1990	Painkiller: Released: 17 September 1990; Label: Columbia (#46891); Format: CD, CS, LP	26	60	29	—	7	19	—	19	14	26	JPN: Gold; MC: Gold; RIAA: Gold
1997	Jugulator: Released: 28 October 1997; Label: CMC International (#86224); Format: CD, CS, LP	—	—	87	—	9	—	—	33	43	82	
2001	Demolition: Released: 31 July 2001; Label: Atlantic (#83480); Format: CD, CS, LP	—	—	—	72	16	—	—	55	72	165	
2005	Angel of Retribution: Released: 1 March 2005; Label: Epic (#92933); Format: CD, DualDisc, LP	39	58	—	43	5	6	6	3	19	13	
2008	Nostradamus: Released: 17 June 2008; Label: Epic; Format: CD, LP	30	17	9	38	5	12	26	5	12	11	
2014	Redeemer of Souls: Released: 8 July 2014; Label: Epic; Format: CD, LP	12	31	5	22	3	3	9	5	6	6	
2018	Firepower: Released: 9 March 2018; Label: Epic; Format: CD, CS, LP	5	12	3	30	2	5	6	1	3	5	BVMI: Gold
2024	Invincible Shield: Released: 8 March 2024; Label: Epic; Format: CD, CS, LP	2	16	16	5	1	14	3	1	1	18	
"—" denotes releases that did not chart or were not released in that country.

=== Live albums ===
Year	Album details	Peak chart positions									Certifications
Year	Album details	UK	AUS	AUT	CAN	GER	NOR	SWE	SWI	US	Certifications
1979	Unleashed in the East: Released: 21 September 1979; Label: Columbia; Formats: CS, LP	10	—	—	73	—	—	—	—	70	CAN: Platinum; US: Platinum
1987	Priest...Live!: Released: 1 June 1987; Label: Columbia; Formats: CD, CS, LP	47	72	22	39	23	16	19	18	38	CAN: Gold; US: Gold
1998	Priest, Live & Rare: Released: 22 April 1998; Label: Epic; Formats: CD	—	—	—	—	—	—	—	—	—	
1998	'98 Live Meltdown: Released: 29 September 1998; Label: SPV; Formats: CD, CS, LP	—	—	—	—	63	—	—	—	—	
2003	Live in London: Released: 8 April 2003; Label: SPV; Formats: CD, LP	—	—	—	—	54	—	—	—	—	
2009	A Touch of Evil: Live: Released: 14 July 2009; Label: Sony; Formats: CD	—	—	—	107	—	—	—	—	87	
2010	Setlist: The Very Best of Judas Priest Live: Released: 2010; Label: Columbia/Legacy; Formats: CD	—	—	—	—	—	—	—	—	—	
2016	Battle Cry: Released: 25 March 2016; Label: Epic; Formats: CD	—	—	57	—	29	37	—	34	90	

=== Compilation albums ===
Year	Album details	Peak chart positions					
Year	Album details	UK	FIN	GER	SWE	SWI	US
1978	The Best of Judas Priest: Released February 1978; Label: Gull; Formats: CS, LP	—	—	—	—	—	—
1981	Hero, Hero: Released: 1981; Label: Gull; Formats: CS, LP	—	—	—	—	—	—
1993	Metal Works '73–'93: Released: 26 April 1993; Label: Sony; Formats: CD, CS, LP	37	—	50	—	40	155
1997	The Best of Judas Priest: Living After Midnight: Released: 3 February 1997; Label: Columbia; Formats: CD, CS, LP	—	—	—	—	—	—
2000	Genocide: Released: 2000; Label: Gull; Formats: CD	—	—	—	—	—	—
2004	Metalogy: Released: 11 May 2004; Label: Columbia; Formats: CD, LP	—	—	—	—	—	—
2005	Judas Priest: The Collection: Released: 5 April 2005; Label: Columbia; Formats: CD, CS, LP	—	—	—	—	—	—
2006	The Essential Judas Priest: Released: 11 April 2006; Label: Columbia; Formats: CD, CS, LP	—	21	—	23	—	—
2008	Playlist: The Very Best of Judas Priest: Released: 17 June 2008; Label: Columbia; Formats: CD	—	—	—	—	—	—
2011	Single Cuts: Released: 22 August 2011; Label: Columbia; Formats: CD	—	—	—	—	—	—
2011	The Chosen Few: Released: 11 October 2011; Label: Legacy/Sony; Formats: CD	—	—	—	—	—	—
2012	The Complete Albums Collection: Released: 12 June 2012; Label: Legacy; Formats: CD	—	—	—	—	—	—
2021	Reflections: 50 Heavy Metal Years of Music: Released: 15 October 2021; Label: Sony; Formats: CD, LP	—	—	15	—	62	—
2026	The Best of Judas Priest: Released June 2026; Label: Sony; Formats: CD, LP	83	—	—	—	—	—

== Singles ==
This section includes physical UK and US singles only, and additional charted songs in these markets.

Year	Title	B-side	Peak chart positions				Certifications	Album
Year	Title	B-side	UK	US	US Main	US Hard Digi.	Certifications	Album
1974	"Rocka Rolla"	"Never Satisfied"	—	—	—	—		Rocka Rolla
1976	"The Ripper" (Note: Re-released in 1980, b/w "Victim of Changes")	"Island of Domination"	—	—	—	—		Sad Wings of Destiny
1977	"Diamonds & Rust"	"Dissident Aggressor"	—	—	—	—		Sin After Sin
1978	"Better by You, Better than Me"	"Invader"	—	—	—	—		Stained Class
1978	"Before the Dawn"	"Rock Forever"	—	—	—	—		Killing Machine
1979	"Take On the World"	"Starbreaker" (live)	14	—	—	—		Killing Machine
1979	"Evening Star"	"Beyond the realms of Death" (live)	53	—	—	—		Killing Machine
1979	"The Green Manalishi (With the Two Prong Crown)" (Note: First US single release)	"Rock Forever"	—	—	—	—		Killing Machine
1979	"Diamonds & Rust (live)"	"Starbreaker" (live)	—	—	—	—		Unleashed in the East
1980	"Living After Midnight"	"Delivering the Goods" (Note: b/w "Metal Gods" (US))	12	—	—	—		British Steel
1980	"Breaking the Law"	"Metal Gods"	12	—	—	—	BPI: Silver	British Steel
1980	"United"	"Grinder"	26	—	—	—		British Steel
1981	"Don't Go"	"Solar Angels"	51	—	—	—		Point of Entry
1981	"Heading Out to the Highway"	"Rock Forever" / "Hell Bent for Leather" (live)	—	—	10	—		Point of Entry
1981	"Hot Rockin'"	"Breaking the Law" (live)	60	—	—	—		Point of Entry
1982	"You've Got Another Thing Comin'"	"Exciter" (live) (Note: b/w "Diamonds and Rust" (live) (US))	66	67	4	—		Screaming for Vengeance
1982	"(Take These) Chains"	—N/a	—	—	—	—		Screaming for Vengeance
1982	"Electric Eye" [airplay]	—N/a	—	—	38	—		Screaming for Vengeance
1983	"Tyrant"	"Rocka Rolla" / "Genocide"	—	—	—	—		Sad Wings of Destiny
1984	"Freewheel Burning"	"Breaking The Law" (live)	42	—	—	—		Defenders of the Faith
1984	"Some Heads Are Gonna Roll"	"The Green Manalishi" (live) (Note: b/w "Breaking the Law" (live) (US))	97	—	42	—		Defenders of the Faith
1984	"Love Bites"	"Jawbreaker"	—	—	—	—		Defenders of the Faith
1986	"Turbo Lover"	"Hot for Love" (Note: b/w "Reckless" (US))	—	—	44	—		Turbo
1986	"Locked In"	"Reckless" (Note: b/w "Hot for Love" (US))	—	—	25	—		Turbo
1986	"Parental Guidance"	"Rock You All Around the World"	—	—	—	—		Turbo
1988	"Johnny B. Goode"	"Rock You All Around The World (Live)	64	—	47	—		Ram It Down
1990	"Painkiller"	"United"	74	—	—	—		Painkiller
1991	"A Touch of Evil"	"Between The Hammer and The Anvil"	58	—	29	—		Painkiller
1993	"Night Crawler"	"Living After Midnight" (Live)	63	—	—	—		Metal Works '73–'93
2001	"Machine Man"	"Subterfuge"	159	—	—	—		Demolition
2005	"Revolution"	—N/a	—	—	23	—		Angel of Retribution
2018	"Lightning Strike"	—N/a	—	—	21	11		Firepower
2023	"Panic Attack"	—N/a	—	—	—	10		Invincible Shield
2023	"Trial by Fire"	—N/a	—	—	—	—		Invincible Shield
2024	"Crown of Horns"	—N/a	—	—	24	—		Invincible Shield
2025	"War Pigs"	—N/a	—	—	45	—		non-album
"—" denotes releases that did not chart or were not released in that country.

== Videography ==
=== Video albums ===
Year	Video details	Certifications
1983	Live Vengeance '82: Label: CMV; Format: VHS	—
1986	Fuel for Life: Label: Columbia; Formats: VHS	US: Gold
1987	Priest...Live!: Released: 21 June 1987; Label: Columbia; Formats: VHS	US: Gold
1993	Metal Works '73–'93: Released: 25 May 1993; Label: Sony (#49885); Format: VHS	—
2002	Live in London: Released: 23 July 2002; Label: Steamhammer (#7426); Format: DVD, VHS	—
2003	Electric Eye: Released: 24 November 2003; Label: Sony (#51411); Format: DVD	US: Platinum AUS: Gold
2005	Rising in the East: Released: 15 November 2005; Label: Rhino; Formats: VHS, DVD	US: Gold
2006	Live Vengeance '82: Released: December, 2006; Label: Sony; Formats: DVD, UMD	—
2013	Epitaph: Released: 27 May 2013; Label: Columbia/Legacy; Formats: Blu-ray, DVD	—
2016	Battle Cry: Released: 25 March 2016; Label: Columbia/Epic; Formats: Blu-ray, DVD	—

=== Music videos ===
Year	Title	Director
1980	"Living After Midnight"	Julien Temple
1980	"Breaking the Law"	Julien Temple
1981	"Don't Go"	Julien Temple
1981	"Heading Out to the Highway"	Julien Temple
1981	"Hot Rockin'"	Julien Temple
1982	"You've Got Another Thing Comin'"	Julien Temple
1984	"Freewheel Burning"	Julien Temple
1984	"Love Bites"	Keith "Keef" MacMillan
1986	"Turbo Lover"	Wayne Isham
1986	"Locked In"	Wayne Isham
1988	"Johnny B. Goode"	Wayne Isham
1990	"Painkiller"	Wayne Isham
1990	"A Touch of Evil"	Wayne Isham
1997	"Burn in Hell"	
2001	"Lost and Found"	Aubrey Powell
2005	"Revolution"	
2008	"The Four Horsemen"/"War"	Tony Luke
2018	"Lightning Strike"	
2018	"Spectre"	
2018	"No Surrender"	
2023	"Trial By Fire"	
2024	"Panic Attack"	
2024	"Crown of Horns"	
2024	"Invincible Shield"	
2025	"War Pigs"	

== Tribute albums ==
Year	Video details	Certifications
1997	A Tribute to Judas Priest: Legends of Metal Vol. I: Label: CMV; Format: CD	—
1997	A Tribute to Judas Priest: Legends of Metal Vol. II: Label: CMV; Format: CD	—
2002	A Tribute to the Priest: Label: Nuclear Blast; Format: CD	—
2008	Hell Bent Forever: A Tribute to Judas Priest: Label: Deadline; Formats: CD, digital	—
