= The Essential Judas Priest =

Greatest hits album by Judas Priest
- Released: 11 April 2006
- Recorded: 1976–2005
- Genre: Heavy metal
- Length: 154:22
- Label: Columbia / Sony Music

Judas Priest chronology
Angel of Retribution (2005)	The Essential Judas Priest (2006)	Nostradamus (2008)

Professional ratings
Review scores
Source	Rating
AllMusic	4.5/5 stars

The Essential Judas Priest is a 2006 two-disc compilation album by English heavy metal band Judas Priest. It contains 34 songs from throughout their career right up to their then-most recent album Angel of Retribution, but excludes the Tim "Ripper" Owens era and material from their debut album Rocka Rolla. It was re-released in 2008 as a limited-edition 3-disc package. It was re-released again in 2010 as a Blu-spec CD. This version has a slightly different track list on the first disc; "Nostradamus" from the 2008 album of that name replaces "Victim of Changes" as the fifth track.

In 2015 The Essential Judas Priest was re-released with the same album art but with very different track listings. Additionally, "Nostradamus", "Dragonaut", and "Redeemer of Souls" replaced "United", "Hot Rockin'", and "Out in the Cold".

== Track listing (2006/2008 original/re-release) ==
Disc one
No.	Title	Writer(s)	Original album	Length
1.	"Judas Rising"	Rob Halford, K.K. Downing, Glenn Tipton	Angel of Retribution (2005)	3:52
2.	"Breaking the Law"	Halford, Downing, Tipton	British Steel (1980)	2:35
3.	"Hell Bent for Leather"	Tipton	Killing Machine (1978)	2:40
4.	"Diamonds & Rust" (Joan Baez cover)	Joan Baez	Sin After Sin (1977)	3:26
5.	"Victim of Changes"	Al Atkins, Halford, Downing, Tipton	Sad Wings of Destiny (1976)	7:47
6.	"Love Bites"	Halford, Downing, Tipton	Defenders of the Faith (1984)	4:47
7.	"Heading Out to the Highway"	Halford, Downing, Tipton	Point of Entry (1981)	3:45
8.	"Ram It Down"	Halford, Downing, Tipton	Ram It Down (1988)	4:48
9.	"Beyond the Realms of Death"	Halford, Les Binks	Stained Class (1978)	6:51
10.	"You've Got Another Thing Comin'"	Halford, Downing, Tipton	Screaming for Vengeance (1982)	5:09
11.	"Jawbreaker"	Halford, Downing, Tipton	Defenders of the Faith	3:25
12.	"A Touch of Evil"	Halford, Downing, Tipton, Chris Tsangarides	Painkiller (1990)	5:54
13.	"Delivering the Goods"	Halford, Downing, Tipton	Killing Machine	4:16
14.	"United"	Halford, Downing, Tipton	British Steel	3:35
15.	"Turbo Lover"	Halford, Downing, Tipton	Turbo (1986)	5:33
16.	"Painkiller"	Halford, Downing, Tipton	Painkiller	6:06
17.	"Metal Gods"	Halford, Downing, Tipton	British Steel	4:04

Disc two
No.	Title	Writer(s)	Original album	Length
1.	"The Hellion"	Halford, Downing, Tipton	Screaming for Vengeance	0:41
2.	"Electric Eye"	Halford, Downing, Tipton	Screaming for Vengeance	3:39
3.	"Living After Midnight"	Halford, Downing, Tipton	British Steel	3:30
4.	"Freewheel Burning"	Halford, Downing, Tipton	Defenders of the Faith	4:42
5.	"Exciter"	Halford, Tipton	Stained Class	5:33
6.	"The Green Manalishi (With the Two Pronged Crown)" (Fleetwood Mac cover)	Peter Green	Killing Machine	4:42
7.	"Blood Red Skies"	Halford, Downing, Tipton	Ram It Down	7:05
8.	"Night Crawler"	Halford, Downing, Tipton	Painkiller	5:44
9.	"Sinner"	Halford, Tipton	Sin After Sin	6:43
10.	"Hot Rockin'"	Halford, Downing, Tipton	Point of Entry	3:17
11.	"The Sentinel"	Halford, Downing, Tipton	Defenders of the Faith	5:04
12.	"Before the Dawn"	Halford, Downing, Tipton	Killing Machine	3:23
13.	"Hell Patrol"	Halford, Downing, Tipton	Painkiller	3:37
14.	"The Ripper"	Tipton	Sad Wings of Destiny	2:50
15.	"Screaming for Vengeance"	Halford, Downing, Tipton	Screaming for Vengeance	4:43
16.	"Out in the Cold"	Halford, Downing, Tipton	Turbo	6:27
17.	"Revolution"	Halford, Downing, Tipton	Angel of Retribution	4:42

Disc three (Limited Edition 3.0 only)
No.	Title	Writer(s)	Original album	Length
1.	"Dissident Aggressor"	Halford, Downing, Tipton	Sin After Sin	3:07
2.	"Better by You, Better than Me" (Spooky Tooth cover)	Gary Wright	Stained Class	3:24
3.	"Grinder"	Halford, Downing, Tipton	British Steel	3:58
4.	"Desert Plains"	Halford, Downing, Tipton	Point of Entry	4:36
5.	"Riding on the Wind"	Halford, Downing, Tipton	Screaming for Vengeance	3:07
6.	"Rock Hard Ride Free"	Halford, Downing, Tipton	Defenders of the Faith	5:34
7.	"All Guns Blazing"	Halford, Downing, Tipton	Painkiller	3:56

== Personnel ==
- Rob Halford – vocals
- Glenn Tipton – guitars
- K.K. Downing – guitars
- Ian Hill – bass guitars
- Scott Travis – drums (1, 12, 16 disc 1; 8, 13, 17 disc 2)

Other personnel

- Dave Holland – drums (2, 6, 7, 8, 10, 11, 14, 15, 17 disc 1; 1, 2, 3, 4, 7, 10, 11, 15, 16 disc 2)
- Les Binks – drums (3, 9, 13 disc 1; 5, 6, 12 disc 2)
- Simon Phillips – drums (4 disc 1; 9 disc 2)
- Alan Moore – drums (5 disc 1; 14 disc 2)
- Don Airey (session musician) – keyboards (12 disc 1)

== Charts ==
Chart (2006)	Peak position
Finnish Albums (Suomen virallinen lista)	21
Japanese Albums (Oricon)	138
Swedish Albums (Sverigetopplistan)	23
