= Metal Works '73–'93 =

Metal Works

Greatest hits album by Judas Priest
- Released: 26 April 1993
- Recorded: 1977–1990
- Genre: Heavy metal
- Length: 147:08
- Label: Columbia
- Producer: Judas Priest; Roger Glover; Tom Allom; Chris Tsangarides

Judas Priest chronology
Painkiller (1990)	Metal Works (1993)	Jugulator (1997)

Singles from Metal Works
- 1. "Night Crawler" Released: April 1993

Professional ratings
Review scores
Source	Rating
AllMusic	4.5/5 stars

Metal Works is a compilation album by English heavy metal band Judas Priest, released in April 1993. A remastered edition was released in 2001, with the same track listing.

All material was previously available. All albums to that date are represented with the exception of their debut, Rocka Rolla, although a live version of "Victim of Changes" (from Unleashed in the East, with what appears to be an American sounding audience dubbed on at the end, instead of the familiar Japanese one from the album version) is used rather than the studio version on Sad Wings of Destiny. This is because the band no longer owns the rights to their first two albums.

The band selected the tracks themselves, and made comments in the sleeve-notes.

This project also brought Rob Halford back into the fold for a short while, contributing to the promotion for the album, following his departure from the band in 1992 due to internal tensions.

== Cover art ==
The album cover by Mark Wilkinson (who had done the band's cover art from Ram It Down to Nostradamus) combines elements from the band's previous releases. In the foreground are the Hellion from Screaming for Vengeance and the Painkiller from its eponymous 1990 album. Under the Hellion's body is a razor blade, a reference to the album British Steel. The lower left shows the female hand holding a gear shift knob from Turbo and a mannequin wearing sunglasses and a studded leather headband representing Killing Machine/Hell Bent for Leather. The lower right corner features the door and columns from Sin After Sin, the metallic head from Stained Class enveloped in smoke, and the Metallian from Defenders of the Faith. At the end of the trail of flames in front of the Metallian is the shaft of light from Point of Entry. Additionally, one of the chimneys on the factory in the lower right corner is the band's familiar trident logo.

== Track listing ==
Disc one
No.	Title	Writer(s)	Original album	Length
1.	"The Hellion"	Rob Halford, K.K. Downing, Glenn Tipton	Screaming for Vengeance (1982)	0:41
2.	"Electric Eye"	Halford, Downing, Tipton	Screaming for Vengeance (1982)	3:39
3.	"Victim of Changes" (live)	Al Atkins, Halford, Downing, Tipton	Unleashed in the East (1979)	7:12
4.	"Painkiller"	Halford, Downing, Tipton	Painkiller (1990)	6:06
5.	"Eat Me Alive"	Halford, Downing, Tipton	Defenders of the Faith (1984)	3:34
6.	"Devil's Child"	Halford, Downing, Tipton	Screaming for Vengeance (1982)	4:48
7.	"Dissident Aggressor"	Halford, Downing, Tipton	Sin After Sin (1977)	3:07
8.	"Delivering the Goods"	Halford, Downing, Tipton	Killing Machine (1978)	4:16
9.	"Exciter"	Halford, Tipton	Stained Class (1978)	5:04
10.	"Breaking the Law"	Halford, Downing, Tipton	British Steel (1980)	2:35
11.	"Hell Bent for Leather"	Tipton	Killing Machine (1978)	2:41
12.	"Blood Red Skies"	Halford, Downing, Tipton	Ram It Down (1988)	7:50
13.	"Metal Gods"	Halford, Downing, Tipton	British Steel (1980)	4:08
14.	"Before the Dawn"	Halford, Downing, Tipton	Killing Machine (1978)	3:23
15.	"Turbo Lover"	Halford, Downing, Tipton	Turbo (1986)	5:33
16.	"Ram It Down"	Halford, Downing, Tipton	Ram It Down (1988)	4:48
17.	"Metal Meltdown"	Halford, Downing, Tipton	Painkiller (1990)	4:14

Disc two
No.	Title	Writer(s)	Original album	Length
1.	"Screaming for Vengeance"	Halford, Downing, Tipton	Screaming for Vengeance (1982)	4:43
2.	"You've Got Another Thing Comin'"	Halford, Downing, Tipton	Screaming for Vengeance (1982)	5:09
3.	"Beyond the Realms of Death"	Halford, Les Binks	Stained Class (1978)	6:53
4.	"Solar Angels"	Halford, Downing, Tipton	Point of Entry (1981)	4:04
5.	"Bloodstone"	Halford, Downing, Tipton	Screaming for Vengeance (1982)	3:51
6.	"Desert Plains"	Halford, Downing, Tipton	Point of Entry (1981)	4:30
7.	"Wild Nights, Hot & Crazy Days"	Halford, Downing, Tipton	Turbo (1986)	4:39
8.	"Heading Out to the Highway" (live)	Halford, Downing, Tipton	Priest...Live! (1987)	4:40
9.	"Living After Midnight"	Halford, Downing, Tipton	British Steel (1980)	3:26
10.	"A Touch of Evil"	Halford, Downing, Tipton, Chris Tsangarides	Painkiller (1990)	5:45
11.	"The Rage"	Halford, Downing, Tipton	British Steel (1980)	4:44
12.	"Night Comes Down"	Halford, Downing, Tipton	Defenders of the Faith (1984)	3:58
13.	"Sinner"	Halford, Tipton	Sin After Sin (1977)	6:43
14.	"Freewheel Burning"	Halford, Downing, Tipton	Defenders of the Faith (1984)	4:22
15.	"Night Crawler"	Halford, Downing, Tipton	Painkiller (1990)	5:45

== Charts ==
Chart (1993)	Peak position
German Albums (Offizielle Top 100)	50
Japanese Albums (Oricon)	32
Swiss Albums (Schweizer Hitparade)	40
UK Albums (Official Charts)	37
US Billboard 200	155
