= The Complete Albums Collection (Judas Priest box set) =

Box set by Judas Priest
- Released: 12 June 2012
- Recorded: 1974–1990, 2004–2008
- Studio: Various
- Genre: Heavy metal
- Length: 15:53:49
- Label: Legacy
- Producers: Tom Allom, Roger Bain, K.K. Downing, Roger Glover, James Guthrie, Rob Halford, Dennis MacKay, Glenn Tipton, Max West, Chris Tsangarides, Roy Z

Judas Priest chronology
The Chosen Few (2011)	The Complete Albums Collection (2012)

Professional ratings
Review scores
Source	Rating
AllMusic	3.5/5 stars
Blabbermouth.net	9/10
Record Collector	4/5 stars

The Complete Albums Collection is a compilation box set album collection by English heavy metal band Judas Priest, released on 12 June 2012 by Legacy Recordings. The Complete Albums Collection contains 17 Judas Priest albums, but does not feature material from when Tim "Ripper" Owens fronted the band.

== Remastered tracks ==
Each individual album is packaged in a replica mini-LP sleeve reproducing that album's original cover art. The set also contains a 40-page booklet with photos, liner notes, and album credits. Rocka Rolla and Sad Wings of Destiny have been newly remastered by Vic Anesini, with the latter album featuring a corrected track order beginning with "Prelude" and ending with "Deceiver", as indicated on the packaging of the original release. Albums from Sin After Sin through Painkiller utilize the 2001 remasters and feature the same bonus tracks, while Angel of Retribution through A Touch of Evil: Live are identical to their original releases.

== Reception ==
Dayal Patterson of Record Collector wrote "Each album is presented here in a sturdy slipcase adorned with the original LP artwork, and there’s certainly no questioning the quality of the music – indeed, the majority of the albums here are considered vital entries in the heavy metal canon, with even the few weaker releases bearing some winning numbers. That said, the “complete” part of the box set’s title is somewhat misleading: there’s no sign of Jugulator or Demolition, the two albums made during Halford’s absence from the group, not to mention the brevity of the booklet, which omits both lyrics and colour. Still, it will certainly look much nicer on your shelf than 17 jewel cases..." Mary Ouelette of Loudwire stated "All in all, it's a great way for any fan to celebrate the music and the notable career of Judas Priest." James Christopher Monger of AllMusic commented "...The Complete Albums Collection is a treasure trove of metal goodness from a giant of the genre."

== Albums included ==
1. Rocka Rolla
2. Sad Wings of Destiny
3. Sin After Sin
4. Stained Class
5. Killing Machine
6. Unleashed in the East
7. British Steel
8. Point of Entry
9. Screaming for Vengeance
10. Defenders of the Faith
11. Turbo
12. Priest...Live!
13. Ram It Down
14. Painkiller
15. Angel of Retribution
16. Nostradamus
17. A Touch of Evil: Live

== Personnel ==
- Rob Halford
- Glenn Tipton
- K. K. Downing
- Ian Hill
- Scott Travis
- John Hinch
- Alan Moore
- Simon Phillips
- Les Binks
- Dave Holland
