= Hero, Hero =

1981 compilation album by Judas Priest

Compilation album by Judas Priest
- Released: 1981
- Recorded: 1974–1977
- Genre: Heavy metal
- Label: Gull
- Producer: Jeffery Calvert, Geraint Hughes, Judas Priest

Judas Priest chronology
British Steel (1980)	Hero, Hero (1981)	Point of Entry (1981)

Professional ratings
Review scores
Source	Rating
AllMusic	2/5 stars

Hero, Hero is a compilation album of early Judas Priest recordings, released in between British Steel (1980) and Point of Entry (1981) by Gull Records. It consists of all ten tracks from the Rocka Rolla album, six tracks from the Sad Wings of Destiny album, and an alternate version of "Diamonds And Rust". The tracks from Rocka Rolla and "Diamonds And Rust" were remixed by Rodger Bain in 1981. The tracks from Sad Wings of Destiny were not remixed.

Hero, Hero was released under the Gull Records - the band's former record label - in an effort to "capitalize on Judas Priest's popularity." Judas Priest's management firmly states that people should not buy these compilations, because even though it would seem like a new album on the surface, it's just a re-issue of material already recorded. Despite this, the remixed songs on the album appeal to collectors.

The CD releases of the album have produced a few alternate versions. Some European CDs sequenced the tracks differently so that the tracks from sides 3 and 4 of the LP come before the tracks from sides 1 and 2. The US CDs released by Transluxe and Koch Records used the mixes from the original Rocka Rolla album rather than the remixed tracks from the original Hero, Hero LP.

== Track listing ==
Side one
No.	Title	Writer(s)	Original album	Length
1.	"Prelude"	Glenn Tipton	Sad Wings of Destiny (1976)	2:02
2.	"Tyrant"	Rob Halford, Tipton	Sad Wings of Destiny (1976)	4:28
3.	"Rocka Rolla"	Halford, K.K. Downing, Tipton	Rocka Rolla (1974)	3:05
4.	"One for the Road"	Halford, Downing	Rocka Rolla (1974)	4:40

Side two
No.	Title	Writer(s)	Original album	Length
1.	"Victim of Changes"	Al Atkins, Halford, Downing, Tipton	Sad Wings of Destiny (1976)	7:47
2.	"Dying to Meet You"	Halford, Downing	Rocka Rolla (1974)	6:16
3.	"Never Satisfied"	Atkins, Downing	Rocka Rolla (1974)	4:50

Side three
No.	Title	Writer(s)	Original album	Length
1.	"Dreamer Deceiver"	Atkins, Halford, Downing, Tipton	Sad Wings of Destiny (1976)	5:51
2.	"Deceiver"	Halford, Downing, Tipton	Sad Wings of Destiny (1976)	2:40
3.	"Winter"	Atkins, Downing, Ian Hill	Rocka Rolla (1974)	1:31
4.	"Deep Freeze"	Downing	Rocka Rolla (1974)	1:20
5.	"Winter Retreat"	Halford, Downing	Rocka Rolla (1974)	3:27
6.	"Cheater"	Halford, Downing	Rocka Rolla (1974)	2:57

Side four
No.	Title	Writer(s)	Original album	Length
1.	"Diamonds & Rust"	Joan Baez	The Best of Judas Priest (1978)	3:26
2.	"Run of the Mill"	Halford, Downing, Tipton	Rocka Rolla (1974)	8:33
3.	"Genocide"	Halford, Downing, Tipton	Sad Wings of Destiny (1976)	5:51
4.	"Caviar and Meths"	Atkins, Downing, Hill	Rocka Rolla (1974)	2:00

== Personnel ==
- Rob Halford – lead vocals, harmonica
- K.K. Downing – guitar
- Glenn Tipton – guitar, keyboards, backing vocals
- Ian Hill – bass
- John Hinch – drums
- Alan Moore – drums
