= Genocide (album) =

Compilation album by Judas Priest
- Released: 2000
- Genre: Heavy metal
- Label: Gull

Professional ratings
Review scores
| Source | Rating |
|---|---|
| Allmusic | 4/5 stars |

Genocide is a 2000 Judas Priest compilation consisting of their first two albums, Rocka Rolla and Sad Wings of Destiny, plus a bonus track from the Sad Wings of Destiny sessions as well. Like several others in the past, Genocide was released under the label Gull, in an effort to "capitalize on Judas Priest's popularity." Judas Priest's management firmly states that people should not buy these compilations, because even though it would seem like a new album on the surface, it's just a re-issue of material already recorded.

== Track listing ==
Disc one
| No. | Title | Writer(s) | Length |
|---|---|---|---|
| 1. | "One for the Road" | Rob Halford, K.K. Downing | 4:34 |
| 2. | "Rocka Rolla" | Halford, Downing, Glenn Tipton | 3:05 |
| 3. | "Winter" | Al Atkins, Downing, Ian Hill | 1:42 |
| 4. | "Deep Freeze" | Downing | 1:21 |
| 5. | "Winter Retreat" | Halford, Downing | 3:28 |
| 6. | "Cheater" | Halford, Downing | 2:59 |
| 7. | "Never Satisfied" | Atkins, Downing | 4:50 |
| 8. | "Run of the Mill" | Halford, Downing, Tipton | 8:34 |
| 9. | "Dying to Meet You" | Halford, Downing | 6:23 |
| 10. | "Caviar and Meths" | Atkins, Downing, Hill | 2:02 |
| 11. | "Diamonds & Rust" (original version of a Joan Baez cover) | Joan Baez | 3:12 |

Tracks 1–10 were originally released as Rocka Rolla in 1974; "Diamonds & Rust" is included as a bonus track.

Disc two
| No. | Title | Writer(s) | Length |
|---|---|---|---|
| 1. | "Victim of Changes" | Atkins, Halford, Downing, Tipton | 7:47 |
| 2. | "The Ripper" | Tipton | 2:50 |
| 3. | "Dreamer Deceiver" | Atkins, Halford, Downing, Tipton | 5:51 |
| 4. | "Deceiver" | Halford, Downing, Tipton | 2:40 |
| 5. | "Prelude" | Tipton | 2:02 |
| 6. | "Tyrant" | Halford, Tipton | 4:28 |
| 7. | "Genocide" | Halford, Downing, Tipton | 5:51 |
| 8. | "Epitaph" | Tipton | 3:08 |
| 9. | "Island of Domination" | Halford, Downing, Tipton | 4:32 |

Disc two was originally released as Sad Wings of Destiny in 1976.

== Personnel ==
- Rob Halford - lead vocals, harmonica
- K.K. Downing - guitar
- Glenn Tipton - guitar, keyboards, backing vocals
- Ian Hill - bass
- John Hinch - drums (1–10 on disc 1)
- Alan Moore - drums (11 on disc 1, 1–9 on disc 2)
