= The Best of Judas Priest =

Greatest hits album by Judas Priest
- Released: February 1978
- Recorded: 1974–1975
- Genre: Heavy metal
- Length: 34:57
- Label: Gull
- Producer: Jeffery Calvert, Geraint Hughes, Judas Priest

Judas Priest chronology
Sin After Sin (1977)	The Best of Judas Priest (1978)	Stained Class (1978)

Professional ratings
Review scores
Source	Rating
AllMusic	2.5/5 stars

The Best of Judas Priest is a compilation album featuring select songs from English heavy metal band Judas Priest's first two albums, Rocka Rolla (1974) and Sad Wings of Destiny (1976).

== Overview ==
After forming in 1969, Judas Priest signed with Gull Records in 1974. When the band jumped to CBS Records in early 1977, they had to break their contract with Gull to do so. In the legal fallout that ensued, the band forfeited their rights to all material recorded with Gull.

The album is not a typical "greatest hits" type of collection as the title would imply. It was the first of a handful of releases featuring material Judas Priest had recorded during their time with Gull, and was produced by the label in an effort to capitalize on the band's growing popularity. As the band had forfeited their legal claim to the music, the album was released without their consent.

== Track listing ==
=== Original LP release ===
Side one
No.	Title	Writer(s)	Length
1.	"Dying to Meet You"	Rob Halford, K.K. Downing	6:11
2.	"Never Satisfied"	Al Atkins, Downing	4:46
3.	"Rocka Rolla"	Halford, Downing, Glenn Tipton	3:02
4.	"Diamonds and Rust" (original version of a Joan Baez cover)	Joan Baez	3:15

All songs originally from Rocka Rolla (1974), except Diamonds & Rust, which was an outtake from the Sad Wings of Destiny sessions and was included to generate more interest on the compilation.

Side two
No.	Title	Writer(s)	Length
1.	"Victim of Changes §"	Atkins, Halford, Downing, Tipton	7:43
2.	"Island of Domination"	Halford, Downing, Tipton	4:15
3.	"The Ripper §"	Tipton	2:46
4.	"Deceiver"	Halford, Downing, Tipton	2:44

All songs originally released on Sad Wings of Destiny (1976). § – at least on certain releases both on vinyl and CD the track is featured in a different mix from its original 1976 version. An example can be found on the 1989 CD release on Possum Records from Australia.

=== 1987 CD release ===
No.	Title	Writer(s)	Original album	Length
1.	"Dying to Meet You"	Halford, Downing	Rocka Rolla (1974)	6:11
2.	"Never Satisfied"	Atkins, Downing	Rocka Rolla (1974)	4:46
3.	"Rocka Rolla"	Halford, Downing, Tipton	Rocka Rolla (1974)	3:02
4.	"Diamonds and Rust" (original version of a Joan Baez cover)	Baez	Demo track recorded for Sad Wings of Destiny (1976), later found on many Rocka Rolla reissues	3:13
5.	"Victim of Changes"	Atkins, Halford, Downing, Tipton	Sad Wings of Destiny (1976)	7:43
6.	"Island of Domination"	Halford, Downing, Tipton	Sad Wings of Destiny (1976)	4:15
7.	"The Ripper"	Tipton	Sad Wings of Destiny (1976)	2:46
8.	"Deceiver"	Halford, Downing, Tipton	Sad Wings of Destiny (1976)	2:44
9.	"Epitaph"	Tipton	Sad Wings of Destiny (1976)	3:08
10.	"One for the Road"	Halford, Downing	Rocka Rolla (1974)	4:34

=== 2001 CD release ===
This release contains, according to Judas Priest's website, a "mindless interview" from former drummer John Hinch, who was let go from the band because he was "musically inadequate". They have described it as "not only misleading but full of rubbish and false information". In a 1998 interview with Goldmine Magazine, Tipton commented on the reason the company bothered to release the album:

"We believe that they're abusing the kids with...The Best of Judas Priest and the re-packaging. It's not fair for us to condone them, because it's ripping the kids off. On the "Insight Series" CD, they include bullshit interviews with our first drummer John Hinch, who couldn't even play the drums, believe you me. But it's tracked to look like new songs. We don't get royalties off it, but the kids think we do."

No.	Title	Writer(s)	Original album	Length
1.	"Dying to Meet You"	Halford, Downing	Rocka Rolla (1974)	6:11
2.	"Never Satisfied"	Atkins, Downing	Rocka Rolla (1974)	4:46
3.	"Rocka Rolla"	Halford, Downing, Tipton	Rocka Rolla (1974)	3:02
4.	"Diamonds and Rust" (original version of a Joan Baez cover)	Baez	Demo track recorded for Sad Wings of Destiny (1976), later found on many Rocka Rolla reissues	3:14
5.	"Victim of Changes"	Atkins, Halford, Downing, Tipton	Sad Wings of Destiny (1976)	7:43
6.	"Island of Domination"	Halford, Downing, Tipton	Sad Wings of Destiny (1976)	4:15
7.	"The Ripper"	Tipton	Sad Wings of Destiny (1976)	2:46
8.	"Deceiver"	Halford, Downing, Tipton	Sad Wings of Destiny (1976)	2:44
9.	"Epitaph"	Tipton	Sad Wings of Destiny (1976)	3:08
10.	"One for the Road"	Halford, Downing	Rocka Rolla (1974)	4:34
11.	"Halford Finds Priest"		Interview with John Hinch (1995)	5:31
12.	"Priest Finds Audience"		Interview with John Hinch (1995)	3:31
13.	"Dual Guitars"		Interview with John Hinch (1995)	1:07
14.	"Songwriting"		Interview with John Hinch (1995)	3:00
15.	"What's in a Name"		Interview with John Hinch (1995)	0:40
16.	"Gull Records"		Interview with John Hinch (1995)	2:01
17.	"Whiskey Woman/Victim of Changes"		Interview with John Hinch (1995)	1:09
18.	"Rob Halford"		Interview with John Hinch (1995)	1:02

== Personnel ==
- Rob Halford – lead vocals, harmonica
- K.K. Downing – guitar
- Glenn Tipton – guitar, backing vocals
- Ian Hill – bass
- John Hinch – drums
- Alan Moore – drums

== Charts ==
Chart (2026)	Peak position
Austrian Albums (Ö3 Austria)	25
Belgian Albums (Ultratop Flanders)	43
Belgian Albums (Ultratop Wallonia)	60
French Physical Albums (SNEP)	64
French Rock & Metal Albums (SNEP)	14
German Albums (Offizielle Top 100)	18
German Rock & Metal Albums (Offizielle Top 100)	7
Hungarian Physical Albums (MAHASZ)	21
Scottish Albums (Official Charts)	8
Swedish Hard Rock Albums (Sverigetopplistan)	9
Swiss Albums (Schweizer Hitparade)	10
UK Albums (Official Charts)	83
UK Rock & Metal Albums (Official Charts)	1
US Top Album Sales (Billboard)	33
