= Victim of Changes (disambiguation) =

Victim of Changes may refer to:

- "Victim of Changes" (song), a 1976 song by Judas Priest
- Victim of Changes (album), a 1998 album by Al Atkins
