= Nostradamus World Tour =

2008–09 concert tour by Judas Priest

- Tour by Judas Priest
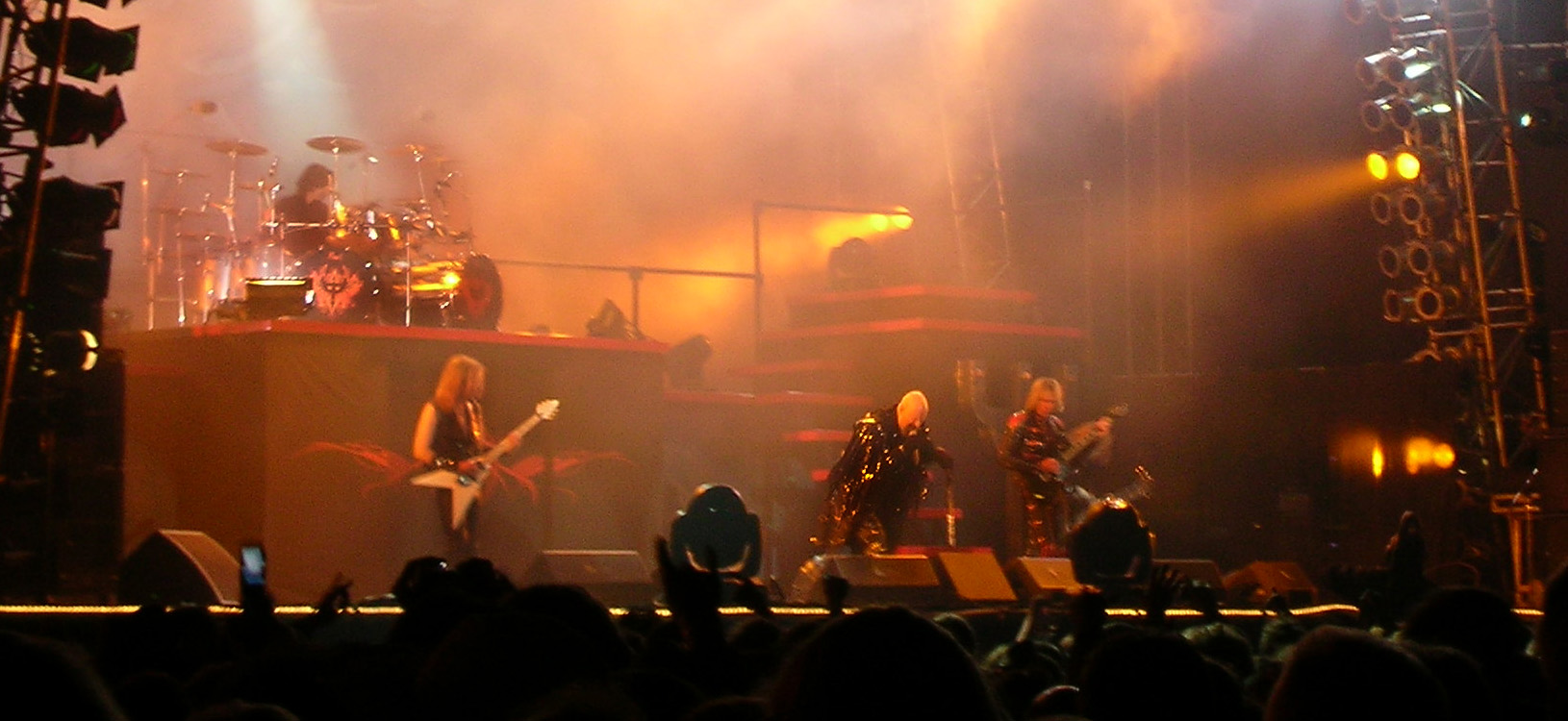
- Judas Priest performing at the Sweden Rock Festival in Sölvesborg
- Location: Asia; Europe; North America; Oceania; South America
- Associated album: Nostradamus
- Start date: 3 June 2008
- End date: 17 October 2009
- Legs: 9
- No. of shows: 144; 71 in North America; 50 in Europe; 10 in Asia; 8 in South America; 5 in Oceania; 4 cancellations

Judas Priest concert chronology
- Retribution Tour (2005); Nostradamus World Tour (2008–2009) Metal Masters Tour (2008); Epitaph World Tour (2011–2012)

The Nostradamus World Tour was a concert tour by English heavy metal band, Judas Priest, in support of the group's 16th studio album, Nostradamus, which was released in June 2008.

The tour began in June 2008 with a European leg starting in Helsinki, and wrapping up mid-July in Istanbul, Turkey. The jaunt included appearances at festivals such as Download, Graspop Metal Meeting, and Roskilde.

The group kicked off a North American leg in July beginning in Seattle. In early August, the band commenced the Metal Masters Tour portion of the itinerary in Camden, New Jersey, which featured fellow heavy metal stalwarts Heaven and Hell, Motörhead, and Testament.

In September, the act visited Australia, South Korea, and Japan. The following month, the band toured Mexico and South America through mid-November.

In February 2009, the act kicked off a second leg of European shows as part of a touring package dubbed the "Priest Feast", which also featured Megadeth and Testament. The tour started in Dublin and culminated in Amsterdam in late March.

In late June, the band commenced a jaunt of special shows in North America to commemorate the 30th anniversary of the group's renowned album, British Steel. The record was performed in its entirety for the first time, alongside a selection of "other Priest classics". The tour, which featured Whitesnake as the support act, began in Indianapolis and wrapped up late August in Gilford, New Hampshire.

In mid-October, the group returned to Japan to perform three dates. The jaunt included a headline slot at the Loud Park Festival in Chiba City, the final date of the entire tour.

A live album entitled, A Touch of Evil: Live, which features songs recorded on the band's 2008 dates, was released in July 2009. The group were subsequently awarded a 2010 Grammy Award for Best Metal Performance for their live rendition of "Dissident Aggressor", which originally appeared on Sin After Sin.

The group's performance at the Hard Rock Arena in Hollywood, Florida, U.S. was recorded and issued on DVD as part of the 30th anniversary reissue of British Steel, released in May 2010. A limited edition was also available which included a CD of the performance, as well as a DVD.

== Tour dates ==
Date	City	Country	Venue
Europe, Leg #1
3 June 2008	Helsinki	Finland	Helsinki Ice Hall
5 June 2008	Sölvesborg	Sweden	Sweden Rock Festival
7 June 2008	Trondheim	Norway	Trondheim Rock Festival
8 June 2008	Bergen	Norway	Bergenshallen
11 June 2008	Esch-sur-Alzette	Luxembourg	Rockhal
13 June 2008	Donington Park	England	Download Festival
15 June 2008	Nickelsdorf	Austria	Nova Rock Festival
16 June 2008	Bratislava	Slovakia	Incheba Hall
17 June 2008	Ostrava	Czech Republic	ČEZ Aréna
18 June 2008	Chorzów	Poland	Silesian Stadium
20 June 2008	Bilbao	Spain	Kobetasonik Festival
22 June 2008	Zwolle	Netherlands	Ijsselhal
23 June 2008	Düsseldorf	Germany	Philipshalle
24 June 2008	Munich	Germany	Zenith
25 June 2008	Huttwil	Switzerland	National Sportcentrum
27 June 2008	Dessel	Belgium	Graspop Metal Meeting Festival
28 June 2008	Stuttgart	Germany	Bang Your Head Festival
29 June 2008	Bologna	Italy	Gods of Metal Festival
3 July 2008	Liberec	Czech Republic	Tipsport Arena
5 July 2008	Roskilde	Denmark	Roskilde Festival
9 July 2008	Athens	Greece	Rockwave Festival
11 July 2008	Bucharest	Romania	BestFest
13 July 2008	Istanbul	Turkey	Turkcell Kuruçeşme Arena
North America, leg #1
22 July 2008	Seattle	United States	WaMu Theater
23 July 2008	Victoria	Canada	Save-On-Foods Memorial Centre
24 July 2008	Vancouver	Canada	General Motors Place
26 July 2008	Calgary	Canada	Monsters of Rock Festival
27 July 2008	Edmonton	Canada	Shaw Conference Centre
29 July 2008	Saskatoon	Canada	Credit Union Centre
30 July 2008	Winnipeg	Canada	MTS Centre
1 August 2008	Kansas City	United States	City Market
2 August 2008	Saint Paul	United States	Myth
6 August 2008 ^{[1]}	Camden	United States	Susquehanna Bank Center
7 August 2008 ^{[1]}	Bristow	United States	Nissan Pavilion
9 August 2008 ^{[1]}	Holmdel	United States	PNC Bank Arts Center
10 August 2008 ^{[1]}	Wantagh	United States	Nikon at Jones Beach Theater
12 August 2008	Montreal	Canada	Bell Centre
13 August 2008 ^{[1]}	Toronto	Canada	Molson Amphitheatre
15 August 2008 ^{[1]}	Uncasville	United States	Mohegan Sun Arena
16 August 2008 ^{[1]}	Burgettstown	United States	Post-Gazette Pavilion
18 August 2008 ^{[1]}	Clarkston	United States	DTE Energy Music Theater
19 August 2008 ^{[1]}	Tinley Park	United States	First Midwest Bank Amphitheatre
21 August 2008 ^{[1]}	Oklahoma City	United States	Zoo Amphitheater
22 August 2008 ^{[1]}	Dallas	United States	SuperPages.com Center
23 August 2008 ^{[1]}	The Woodlands	United States	Cynthia Woods Mitchell Pavilion
24 August 2008 ^{[1]}	Selma	United States	Verizon Wireless Amphitheater
26 August 2008	El Paso	United States	El Paso County Coliseum
27 August 2008 ^{[1]}	Albuquerque	United States	Journal Pavilion
28 August 2008 ^{[1]}	Phoenix	United States	Cricket Wireless Pavilion
30 August 2008 ^{[1]}	San Bernardino	United States	Glen Helen Pavilion
31 August 2008 ^{[1]}	Mountain View	United States	Shoreline Amphitheatre
1 September 2008	Las Vegas	United States	Pearl Concert Theater
Australia
10 September 2008	Brisbane	Australia	Brisbane Entertainment Centre
12 September 2008	Sydney	Australia	Acer Arena
13 September 2008	Melbourne	Australia	Vodafone Arena
14 September 2008	Adelaide	Australia	Adelaide Entertainment Centre
16 September 2008	Perth	Australia	Challenge Stadium
Asia, leg #1
21 September 2008	Seoul	South Korea	Olympic Gymnastics Arena
24 September 2008	Nagoya	Japan	Shi Kokaido Hall
25 September 2008	Osaka	Japan	Festival Hall
26 September 2008	Osaka	Japan	Festival Hall
28 September 2008	Yokohama	Japan	Pacifico Yokohama
29 September 2008	Tokyo	Japan	Nippon Budokan
1 October 2008	Tokyo	Japan	Tokyo Kokusai Forum
Latin America
27 October 2008	Monterrey	Mexico	Monterrey Arena
29 October 2008	Guadalajara	Mexico	Arena VFG
30 October 2008	Puebla	Mexico	Auditorio Siglo XXI
31 October 2008	Mexico City	Mexico	Palacio de los Deportes
3 November 2008	Bogotá	Colombia	Centro de Eventos Bima
6 November 2008	Santiago	Chile	Movistar Arena
8 November 2008	Buenos Aires	Argentina	Luna Park
9 November 2008	Buenos Aires	Argentina	Luna Park
12 November 2008	Porto Alegre	Brazil	Teatro do Bourbon Country
14 November 2008	Rio de Janeiro	Brazil	Citibank Hall
15 November 2008	São Paulo	Brazil	Credicard Hall
16 November 2008	São Paulo	Brazil	Credicard Hall
Europe, leg #2 ("Priest Feast" Tour)
10 February 2009	Dublin	Ireland	The O_{2}
11 February 2009	Belfast	Northern Ireland	Odyssey Arena
13 February 2009	Sheffield	England	Sheffield Arena
14 February 2009	Birmingham	England	LG Arena
16 February 2009	Glasgow	Scotland	SECC
17 February 2009	Manchester	England	Manchester Apollo
20 February 2009	Cardiff	Wales	Cardiff International Arena
21 February 2009	London	England	Wembley Arena
24 February 2009	Dortmund	Germany	Westfalenhalle
25 February 2009	Bamberg	Germany	Jako Arena
26 February 2009	Berlin	Germany	Max-Schmeling-Halle
28 February 2009	Stockholm	Sweden	Ericsson Globe
1 March 2009	Gothenburg	Sweden	Scandinavium
3 March 2009	Horsens	Denmark	Forum
4 March 2009	Malmö	Sweden	Malmö Arena
6 March 2009	Hamburg	Germany	Alsterdorfer Sporthalle
7 March 2009	Offenbach	Germany	Stadthalle
8 March 2009	Stuttgart	Germany	Porsche Arena
10 March 2009	Milan	Italy	PalaSharp
11 March 2009	Fribourg	Switzerland	Forum
13 March 2009	San Sebastián	Spain	Velodrome Anoeta
14 March 2009	Zaragoza	Spain	Arena
15 March 2009	Madrid	Spain	La Cubierta
17 March 2009	Lisbon	Portugal	Pavilhão Atlântico
19 March 2009	Barcelona	Spain	Palau Municipal d'Esports de Badalona
21 March 2009	Paris	France	Le Zénith
22 March 2009	Brussels	Belgium	Forest National
23 March 2009	Amsterdam	Netherlands	Heineken Music Hall
North America, leg #2 ("British Steel" 30th Anniversary Tour)
29 June 2009	Indianapolis	United States	Murat Center
1 July 2009	Saint Charles	United States	Family Arena
2 July 2009	Milwaukee	United States	Summerfest
3 July 2009	Saint Paul	United States	Taste of Minnesota Festival
5 July 2009	Wallingford	United States	Chevrolet Theatre
7 July 2009	Mansfield	United States	Comcast Center
8 July 2009	Canandaigua	United States	CMAC
9 July 2009	Toronto	Canada	Molson Amphitheatre
11 July 2009	Holmdel	United States	PNC Bank Arts Center
12 July 2009	Wantagh	United States	Nikon at Jones Beach Theater
14 July 2009	Cleveland	United States	Time Warner Cable Amphitheater
15 July 2009	Clarkston	United States	DTE Energy Music Theater
17 July 2009	Walker	United States	Moondance Jam Festival
18 July 2009	Cadott	United States	Rock Fest
19 July 2009	Chicago	United States	Charter One Pavilion
21 July 2009	Cincinnati	United States	PNC Pavilion
22 July 2009	Nashville	United States	Nashville Municipal Auditorium
24 July 2009	Houston	United States	Verizon Wireless Theater
25 July 2009	San Antonio	United States	AT&T Center
26 July 2009	Corpus Christi	United States	Concrete Street Pavilion
29 July 2009	Paso Robles	United States	California Mid-State Fair
31 July 2009	Concord	United States	Sleep Train Pavilion
1 August 2009	Wheatland	United States	Sleep Train Amphitheatre
2 August 2009	Universal City	United States	Gibson Amphitheatre
4 August 2009	San Diego	United States	SDSU Open Air Theater
5 August 2009	Costa Mesa	United States	Pacific Amphitheatre
7 August 2009	Phoenix	United States	Dodge Theater
8 August 2009	Paradise	United States	Thomas & Mack Center
10 August 2009	Albuquerque	United States	Sandia Casino
11 August 2009	Morrison	United States	Red Rocks Amphitheatre
13 August 2009	Grand Prairie	United States	Nokia Theatre at Grand Prairie
15 August 2009	St. Augustine	United States	St. Augustine Amphitheatre
16 August 2009	Tampa	United States	St. Pete Times Forum
17 August 2009	Hollywood	United States	Hard Rock Arena
19 August 2009	Estero	United States	Germain Arena
20 August 2009	Alpharetta	United States	Verizon Wireless Amphitheatre
22 August 2009	Columbia	United States	Merriweather Post Pavilion
23 August 2009	Gilford	United States	Meadowbrook U.S. Cellular Pavilion
Asia, leg #2
14 October 2009	Kobe	Japan	Kokusai Kaikan
15 October 2009	Nagoya	Japan	Aichi Geijyutsu Gekijyo
17 October 2009	Chiba City	Japan	Loud Park Festival

- 1 Date part of the "Metal Masters Tour" featuring acts Heaven and Hell, Motörhead and Testament.

Cancelled dates

1 July 2008	Belgrade, Serbia	Stadion Tašmajdan	Performance cancelled due to illness.
2 July 2008	Zagreb, Croatia	Dom Sportova	Concert cancelled due to illness.
9 September 2008	Auckland, New Zealand	Vector Arena	Date cancelled due to "logistical and freight issues".
18 February 2009	Nottingham, England	Trent FM Arena	Date cancelled due to "unforeseen circumstances".

== Support acts ==
- Airbourne (Zwolle and Huttwil)
- Black Steel (Perth)
- Cavalera Conspiracy (Zwolle, Zagreb and Liberec)
- Electric Mary (10–14 September 2008)
- Heaven and Hell (6–10, 13–19, 22–24 and 27–31 August 2008)
- Iced Earth (Zwolle, Düsseldorf, Munich and Huttwil)
- Kiuas (Helsinki)
- Kix (Columbia)
- Megadeth (11 February – 23 March 2009)
- Metal Church (Saint Paul)
- Mortal Sin (Sydney)
- Motörhead (6–10, 13, 16–24 and 27–31 August 2008)
- Pop Evil (5–12, 15, 19–22, 25, 26 and 31 July; 8, 11–16, 20–23 August 2009)
- Testament (22–30 July 2008; 6–10 and 13–31 August 2008; 27–31 October 2008; 11 February – 23 March 2009)
- Voivod (Montreal)
- Whitesnake (1–17, 19, 21 and 31 July; 8 and 11 August 2009)
