= United (Judas Priest song) =

Single by Judas Priest

from the album British Steel
- B-side: "Grinder"
- Released: 15 August 1980
- Recorded: January–February 1980; Startling Studios; Ascot, Berkshire
- Genre: Hard rock; heavy metal
- Length: 3:34
- Label: CBS
- Songwriter(s): Rob Halford; K. K. Downing; Glenn Tipton
- Producer(s): Tom Allom

Judas Priest singles chronology
"Breaking the Law" (1980)	"United" (1980)	"Don't Go" (1981)

"United" is the fifth track and last single to be released from the album British Steel by heavy metal group Judas Priest. The song was written very much in the same vein as "Take On the World" from their 1978 album Killing Machine (Hell Bent for Leather in the U.S.) and meant to be a crowd shout-along. It is the fifth track and final song on the first side on the LP version.

The single, with "Grinder" on the B-side, peaked at number 26 on the UK Singles Chart and spent a total of eight weeks on the chart. The "crowd" noise on the live version was enhanced by dub overlay using family members and friends.

== Personnel ==
- Rob Halford – vocals
- K. K. Downing – guitars
- Glenn Tipton – guitars
- Ian Hill – bass guitar
- Dave Holland – drums

== Charts ==
Chart (1980)	Peak position
Ireland (IRMA)	27
UK Singles (OCC)	26
