= Neil Daniels =

British writer

Neil Daniels is a freelance British writer specialising in rock and heavy metal. Educated at Middlesex University, where he obtained a BA Honours degree in Film Studies, he has written books on Iron Maiden, Judas Priest, Robert Plant, Bon Jovi, Linkin Park and ZZ Top.

== Career ==
Daniels co-authored Dawn of the Metal Gods: My Life in Judas Priest & Heavy Metal with original Judas Priest singer and co-founder Al Atkins. It was published in 2009 by the revered Berlin-based publishing company Iron Pages, and features many rare and previously unseen photographs of the band from the early years (1969–1973) as well as items of memorabilia.

In August 2009 he published his first print on demand book, All Pens Blazing: A Heavy Metal Writer's Handbook. With a foreword by the Canadian metal historian Martin Popoff, the book contained 65 exclusive interviews with famed rock and metal writers. It won critical acclaim in the rock and metal press, and a second volume named All Pens Blazing: A Rock & Heavy Metal Writer's Handbook Volume II was planned for mid 2010, along with Rock 'N' Roll Mercenaries: Interviews With Rock Stars Volume I, which collected 40 interviews. In late 2009 Daniels was employed by Colin Larkin to work on the poll website Btoe.

Daniels has conducted interviews with such people as Joe Ambrose, Jeff Apter, Gavin Baddeley, Chris Charlesworth, Ian Christe, Jerry Hopkins, Joel McIver, Colin Larkin, Matthias Mader, Ben Myers, Kim Newman, Dave Thompson, Everett True, Chris Welch and Rich Wilson. Daniels regularly writes for Fireworks, Powerplay and Get Ready To Rock.com, and occasionally contributes to Record Collector. He has also written for The Guardian, Big Cheese, Rock Sound, MediaMagazine, Drowned in Sound and musicOMH. His interests include classic rock, heavy metal, cult films and novels and American comics.

== Published works ==
- The Story of Judas Priest: Defenders of the Faith (Omnibus Press, 2007)
- Robert Plant: Led Zeppelin, Jimmy Page & The Solo Years (IMP, 2008)
- Dawn of the Metal Gods: My Life in Judas Priest & Heavy Metal (IP, 2009)
- Bon Jovi Encyclopaedia (Chrome Dreams, 2009)
- All Pens Blazing: A Heavy Metal Writer's Handbook (Authorsonline, 2009)
- Linkin Park – An Operator's Manual (Chrome Dreams, 2009)
- Don't Stop Believin' – The Untold Story Of Journey (Omnibus Press, 2011)
- Never hold an underdog down – You Me at Six (independent music press 2012)
- Iron Maiden: The Ultimate Illustrated History (Voyageur Press, 2012)
- Beer Drinkers & Hell Raisers : A ZZ Top Guide (Sound Check, 2014)
