= A Touch of Evil: Live =

Live album by Judas Priest
- Released: 13 July 2009
- Recorded: 2005 and 2008
- Genre: Heavy metal
- Label: Sony, Epic
- Producer: Judas Priest, Tom Allom

Judas Priest chronology
| Nostradamus (2008) | A Touch of Evil: Live (2009) | Redeemer of Souls (2014) |

Professional ratings
Review scores
| Source | Rating |
|---|---|
| AllMusic | 4/5 stars |
| PopMatters | 8/10 |
| Ultimate Guitar | 9/10 |

A Touch of Evil: Live is the fifth live album by English heavy metal band Judas Priest. It was released in the UK on 13 July 2009 and in the US on 14 July via Sony and Epic.

== Background ==
A Touch of Evil: Live is the first Judas Priest live album with original vocalist Rob Halford since he rejoined the band in 2003, and the final Judas Priest album to feature guitarist K. K. Downing before his retirement from the band in 2011. It was recorded during the band's 2005, 2008 and 2009 world tours (the songs recorded in 2005 originally appeared on the DVD Rising in the East), and released on 14 July 2009.

Recorded by Martin Walker and Brian Thorene, A Touch of Evil: Live also marks the first Priest album that long-time producer Tom Allom has worked on since 1988's Ram It Down. Allom is credited co-producing the album with the band.

According to Billboard, the album sold around 5,300 copies in the United States in its first week of release, debuting at #87 on the Billboard 200 albums chart.

The track "Dissident Aggressor", originally recorded for Judas Priest's 1977 album Sin After Sin, won the Grammy award for Best Metal Performance in 2010.

== Track listing ==
| No. | Title | Writer(s) | Year | Length |
|---|---|---|---|---|
| 1. | "Judas Rising" | Rob Halford, K. K. Downing, Glenn Tipton | 2005 | 4:23 |
| 2. | "Hellrider" | Halford, Downing, Tipton | 2005 | 5:38 |
| 3. | "Between the Hammer and the Anvil" | Halford, Downing, Tipton | 2008 | 4:35 |
| 4. | "Riding on the Wind" | Halford, Downing, Tipton | 2005 | 3:29 |
| 5. | "Death" | Halford, Downing, Tipton | 2008 | 7:52 |
| 6. | "Beyond the Realms of Death" | Halford, Les Binks | 2005 | 6:52 |
| 7. | "Dissident Aggressor" | Halford, Downing, Tipton | 2008 | 3:04 |
| 8. | "A Touch of Evil" | Halford, Downing, Tipton, Chris Tsangarides | 2005 | 6:11 |
| 9. | "Eat Me Alive" | Halford, Downing, Tipton | 2008 | 4:36 |
| 10. | "Prophecy" | Halford, Downing, Tipton | 2008 | 6:07 |
| 11. | "Painkiller" | Halford, Downing, Tipton | 2005 | 7:12 |

Russian/CIS bonus tracks
| No. | Title | Writer(s) | Year | Length |
|---|---|---|---|---|
| 12. | "Worth Fighting For" | Halford, Downing, Tipton | 2005 | 4:26 |
| 13. | "Angel" | Halford, Downing, Tipton | 2008 | 4:10 |

Japanese bonus tracks
| No. | Title | Writer(s) | Year | Length |
|---|---|---|---|---|
| 12. | "Worth Fighting For" | Halford, Downing, Tipton | 2005 | 4:31 |
| 13. | "Deal with the Devil" | Halford, Downing, Tipton, Roy Z | 2005 | 4:26 |

iTunes bonus track
| No. | Title | Writer(s) | Year | Length |
|---|---|---|---|---|
| 12. | "Breaking the Law" | Halford, Downing, Tipton | 2008 | 2:40 |

== Personnel ==
Judas Priest

- Rob Halford – vocals
- Glenn Tipton – guitars
- K. K. Downing – guitars
- Ian Hill – bass
- Scott Travis – drums

Production

- Produced by Tom Allom & Judas Priest
- Recorded by Martin Walker & Brian Thorene
- Mixed by Richie Kayvan & Tom Allom
- Mastered by Kevin Metcalfe
- Artwork by Mark Wilkinson
- Photography by Ross Halfin & Omar Franchi

== Charts ==
| Chart (2009) | Peak position |
|---|---|
| Japanese Albums (Oricon) | 110 |
| UK Rock & Metal Albums (OCC) | 17 |
| US Billboard 200 | 87 |
| US Top Hard Rock Albums (Billboard) | 13 |
| US Top Rock Albums (Billboard) | 35 |
