= British Steel (album) =

1980 studio album by Judas Priest

Studio album by Judas Priest
- Released: 11 April 1980
- Recorded: December 1979–February 1980
- Studios: Tittenhurst Park, Ascot
- Genre: Heavy metal
- Length: 36:10
- Label: Columbia
- Producer: Tom Allom

Judas Priest chronology
Unleashed in the East (1979)	British Steel (1980)	Point of Entry (1981)

Alternative cover
- 30th anniversary cover

Singles from British Steel
- 1. "Living After Midnight" Released: 21 March 1980; 2. "Breaking the Law" Released: 30 May 1980; 3. "United" Released: 15 August 1980

British Steel is the sixth studio album by English heavy metal band Judas Priest, released on 11 April 1980 by CBS Records and in May 1980 in the US by Columbia Records. It was the band's first album to feature Dave Holland on drums.

The album is a continuation of the more streamlined, commercial sound of their previous album, Killing Machine, with shorter, less complex songs and lyrical themes that were less dark than their previous albums from the 1970s.

The album yielded three singles, "Living After Midnight", "Breaking the Law", and "United", all of which reached the top 40 of the UK Singles Charts, and the first two went on to become among Priest's most enduring airplay staples. Today, the album is regarded as an influential breakthrough for the band, and one of the earliest landmarks in the New Wave of British Heavy Metal movement.

== Musical style ==
British Steel saw the band reprise the commercial sound they had established on Killing Machine. This time, they abandoned some of the dark lyrical themes which had been prominent on their previous releases, but some of it still remains. In a June 2017 appearance on Sirius radio podcast "Rolling Stone Music Now," Rob Halford said the band may have been inspired by AC/DC on some tracks after supporting them on a European tour in 1979. British Steel was recorded at Tittenhurst Park, home of former Beatle Ringo Starr, after a false start at Startling Studios, also located on the grounds of Tittenhurst Park, due to the band preferring Starr's house to the recording studio itself. Digital sampling was not yet widely available at the time of recording, so the band used analog recording of smashing milk bottles to be included in "Breaking the Law", as well as various sounds in "Metal Gods" produced by billiard cues and trays of cutlery.

Halford said about "Metal Gods" in a Billboard article: "I'm a bit of a science-fiction fan, and I think I got the lyrics from that world-robots and sci-fi and metal gods, just by word association. It's a statement against Big Brother or something, about these metal gods that were taking over". Guitarist K. K. Downing said: "When we were recording that track we had loads and loads of fun trying to make it sound as metal as we can. We were shaking cutlery trays in front of the microphones to create the sound of metal marching feet". Halford added: "In those days there wasn't an Internet, so you couldn't go online and download samples. So we would whip a piece of guitar chord on a flight case or swish a pool cue in front of a microphone for the audio effects. I lifted and dropped that cutlery tray 100 times, I think". Downing also added: "Ringo Starr actually owned the house when we were there, so we would go around to see what Ringo had that we could put on our record. So I guess it's Ringo's knives and forks that created the true 'Metal Gods' sound, which is pretty funny to realise".

== Release ==
The album was released on April 11, 1980, within days of other early albums of the New Wave of British Heavy Metal movement such as Wheels of Steel and Iron Maiden. It was released in the UK at a discount price of £3.99, with the advertisements in the music press bearing the legend "British Steal". The songs "Breaking the Law", "United", and "Living After Midnight" were released as singles.

The album was remastered in 2001 with two bonus tracks added. Bonus studio track "Red, White, and Blue" was written in the sessions for the Twin Turbos album (which would become 1986's Turbo) and recorded at Compass Point Studios in Nassau in July 1985. The second bonus track, a live performance of "Grinder", was recorded on 5 May 1984, in Los Angeles during the Defenders of the Faith tour.

In 2009, Judas Priest kicked off their 30th anniversary leg of their Nostradamus World Tour in the US by playing British Steel live in its entirety for the first time. The only other Judas Priest albums of which all the songs have been performed live are Defenders of the Faith (1984) and Rocka Rolla (1974), but neither of them were played in the original LP running order or during the same tour (though the original US debut LP had a different running order than the UK version).

The 30th anniversary release of the album came with a DVD and CD of a live show recorded on 17 August 2009 at the Seminole Hard Rock Arena in Hollywood, Florida as part of the British Steel 30th Anniversary tour. The live versions of all the British Steel tracks from this release were also made available as downloadable content for the Rock Band video game series beginning 11 May 2010.

== Critical reception ==
Professional ratings
Review scores
Source	Rating
About.com	(30th anniv. edition)
AllMusic	5/5 stars
BBC Music	(favourable) (30th anniv. edition)
The Encyclopedia of Popular Music	4/5 stars
PopMatters	8/10 (30th anniv. edition)
Record Collector	(30th anniv. edition)
Rolling Stone	(favourable)
Sputnikmusic	2.0/5

The album received positive reviews. AllMusic gave the album five stars out of five, explaining that the album "kick-started heavy metal's glory days of the 1980s", and saying that "There are still uptempo slices of metallic mayhem bookending the album in 'Rapid Fire' and 'Steeler', plus effective moodier pieces in 'Metal Gods'".

Rolling Stone and BBC Music rated the album favourably, and PopMatters gave the album an 8 out of 10 rating. In 2017, it was ranked third on Rolling Stone's list of "100 Greatest Metal Albums of All Time". The album was also included in the book 1001 Albums You Must Hear Before You Die.

During an interview with Wall of Sound's Educate Ebony podcast, Max Cavalera stated British Steel is the "essential thrash metal" album everyone needs to hear and says "I'm sure you can ask Metallica, if it wasn't for British Steel they wouldn't be here."

== Track listing ==
=== Original release ===
All tracks are written by Glenn Tipton, Rob Halford and K. K. Downing.

Side one
No.	Title	Length
1.	"Rapid Fire"	4:08
2.	"Metal Gods"	4:00
3.	"Breaking the Law"	2:35
4.	"Grinder"	3:58
5.	"United"	3:35

Side two
No.	Title	Length
1.	"You Don't Have to Be Old to Be Wise"	5:04
2.	"Living After Midnight"	3:31
3.	"The Rage"	4:44
4.	"Steeler"	4:30

2001 bonus tracks
No.	Title	Length
10.	"Red, White & Blue" (Recorded during the 1985 Turbo sessions)	3:49
11.	"Grinder" (Live at Long Beach Arena, Long Beach, California; 5 May 1984)	4:49

=== US release ===
All tracks are written by Glenn Tipton, Rob Halford and K. K. Downing.

Side one
No.	Title	Length
1.	"Breaking the Law"	2:33
2.	"Rapid Fire"	4:00
3.	"Metal Gods"	4:04
4.	"Grinder"	3:57
5.	"United"	3:31

Side two
No.	Title	Length
6.	"Living After Midnight"	3:30
7.	"You Don't Have to Be Old to Be Wise"	5:03
8.	"The Rage"	4:44
9.	"Steeler"	4:30

=== 30th Anniversary Edition – bonus live CD/DVD ===
All tracks are written by Glenn Tipton, Rob Halford and K. K. Downing except where noted.

No.	Title	Length
1.	"Rapid Fire"	4:18
2.	"Metal Gods"	4:34
3.	"Breaking the Law"	2:43
4.	"Grinder"	4:06
5.	"United"	3:45
6.	"You Don't Have to Be Old to Be Wise"	5:24
7.	"Living After Midnight"	4:53
8.	"The Rage"	5:04
9.	"Steeler"	5:23
10.	"The Ripper" (Tipton)	3:09
11.	"Prophecy" (Omitted on CD. Some streaming services place this track at the end.)	6:12
12.	"Hell Patrol"	3:57
13.	"Victim of Changes" (Al Atkins, Downing, Halford, Tipton)	9:29
14.	"Freewheel Burning"	5:49
15.	"Diamonds & Rust" (Joan Baez)	4:07
16.	"You've Got Another Thing Comin'"	8:58

== Personnel ==
Judas Priest

- Rob Halford – vocals
- K. K. Downing – guitars
- Glenn Tipton – guitars
- Ian Hill – bass
- Dave Holland – drums

Production

- Produced by Tom Allom
- Engineered by Lou Austin
- Cut by Ray Staff
- Cover design by Rosław Szaybo
- Photography by Robert Elsdale and Robert Ellis

== Charts ==
Chart (1980)	Peak position
Canada Top Albums/CDs (RPM)	45
Japanese Albums (Oricon)	69
Swedish Albums (Sverigetopplistan)	20
UK Albums (Official Charts)	4
US Billboard 200	34

Chart (2010)	Peak position
Finnish Albums (Suomen virallinen lista)	46
German Albums (Offizielle Top 100)	59
Greek Albums (IFPI)	4
Scottish Albums (Official Charts)	74
Spanish Albums (Promusicae)	55
Swiss Albums (Schweizer Hitparade)	92
UK Albums (Official Charts)	78
UK Rock & Metal Albums (Official Charts)	5

== Certifications ==
Region	Certification	Certified units/sales
Canada (Music Canada)	Platinum	100,000^{^}
Sweden (GLF)	Gold	50,000^{^}
United Kingdom (BPI)	Silver	60,000^{^}
United States (RIAA)	Platinum	1,000,000^{^}
^{^} Shipments figures based on certification alone.
