= Dissident Aggressor =

Song by Judas Priest

from the album Sin After Sin, A Touch of Evil: Live
- Released: 1977
- Genre: Heavy metal, proto-thrash
- Length: 3:07
- Label: CBS, Inc. (UK); Columbia (US)
- Songwriters: Halford, Downing, Tipton

"Dissident Aggressor" is a song by the English heavy metal band Judas Priest that was first released on Sin After Sin in 1977. In 2010, thirty-three years after its release, the song won the 2010 Grammy Award for Best Metal Performance after being rereleased as a live track on A Touch of Evil: Live.

== Description and analysis ==
"Dissident Aggressor" closes the album Sin After Sin, and is seguéd into from the slow ballad "Here Come the Tears". The song is in the key of A minor and is played around 103bpm. Over two riffing guitars, vocalist Rob Halford screams in falsetto, alongside a simple bassline that mainly holds down the root notes and somewhat flashy drumming that often revolves around a steady 16th note double-kick pattern as the backbone of the whole rhythm section, as well as featuring abundant use of various cymbals.

The lyrics of the song discuss the Berlin Wall. Says Halford of the song's subject matter and its inspiration:

"It's about the Berlin Wall in 1970 something or other [...] I couldn't sleep, so I went out for a walk. I went to the Berlin Wall and I walked up on top of a boxy-looking post thing. A watchtower thing. It was in November, it was freezing cold, and I was looking over from West Berlin, which is all brightly lit up - pubs were up and everything. And the East side was just dead. It was pitch black, no lights were on, and there were these Russian guys looking back at me in binoculars. That was the seed for what that song talks about, about 'I know what I am, I'm Berlin.'"

"Dissident Aggressor" features what Rolling Stone describes as "driving guitar riffs", and guitarists K. K. Downing and Glenn Tipton trade solos in the song. Rolling Stone further describes the song as an "apocalyptic epic".

== Personnel ==
Judas Priest

- Rob Halford – vocals
- K. K. Downing – lead guitar
- Glenn Tipton – rhythm guitar
- Ian Hill – bass

Additional musicians

- Simon Phillips – drums

== Influence ==
Judas Priest's 1977 album Sin After Sin introduced the combination of double bass drumming, rapid 16th note bass rhythms, and rapid guitar rhythms that came to define the heavy metal genre. While the double-bass rhythms from Judas Priest are generally measured and technical, "Dissident Aggressor" pushed this to be an example of the style with an increase in "tempo and aggression" which was later adopted by other bands with a much harder-edged approach.

The song features "groundbreaking vocal styles" by vocalist Rob Halford, which have since come to be regarded as influential.

American thrash metal band Slayer covered the song on their 1988 album South of Heaven. Coincidentally, Slayer's song "Hate Worldwide" was a nominee for the Grammy Award for Best Metal Performance in 2010, but lost to the live version of "Dissident Aggressor". The song was also covered by US rock band Halestorm on their 2013 covers EP Reanimate 2.0: The Covers.
