= Diamonds & Rust (song) =

1975 song by Joan Baez

Song by Joan Baez

from the album Diamonds & Rust
- Written: November 1974
- Released: April 1975
- Recorded: January 1975
- Genre: Folk rock
- Length: 4:39
- Label: A&M
- Songwriter: Joan Baez
- Producers: David Kershenbaum; Joan Baez

"Diamonds & Rust" is a song written, composed, and performed by Joan Baez. It was written in November 1974 and released in 1975.

In the song, Baez recounts an out-of-the-blue phone call from an old lover, which sends her a decade back in time, to a "crummy" hotel in Greenwich Village in about 1964 or 1965. She recalls giving him a pair of cufflinks, and surmises that memories bring "diamonds and rust". Baez has said the lyrics refer to her relationship with Bob Dylan.

The song was a top 40 hit on the U.S. pop singles chart for Baez, and is regarded by a number of critics and fans as one of her best compositions. It served as the title song on her gold-selling album Diamonds & Rust, which was released in 1975.

== Bob Dylan ==
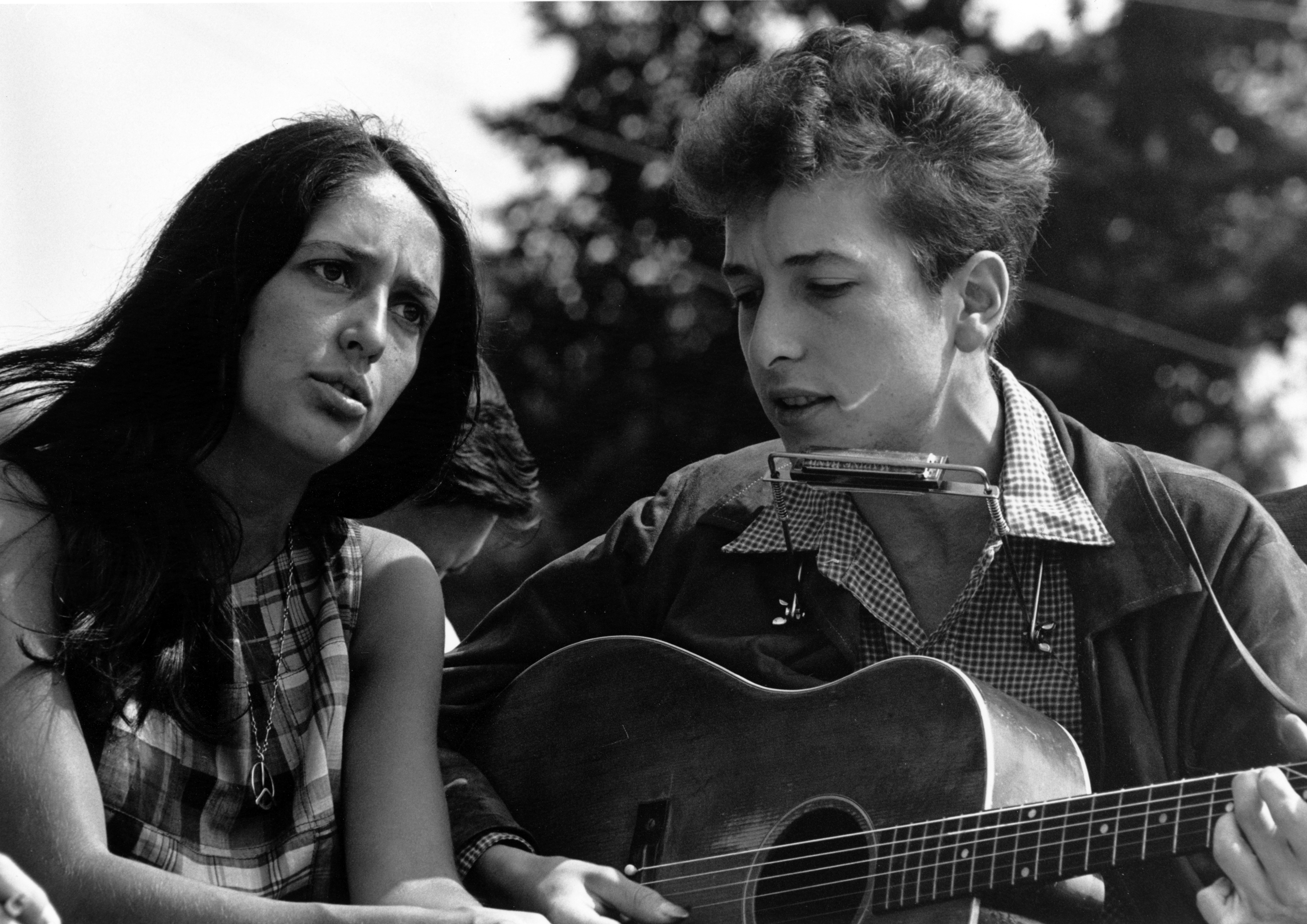
Joan Baez and Bob Dylan, August 28, 1963

The song alludes to Baez's relationship with Bob Dylan ten years previously. Although Dylan is not specifically named in the song, in the third chapter of her memoir, And a Voice to Sing With (1987), Baez uses phrases from the song in describing her relationship with Dylan, and has been explicit that he was the inspiration for the song. She recounts how she originally told Dylan that the song was about her ex-husband David Harris, which was obviously not true.

In her memoir, And a Voice to Sing With, Baez recounts a 1975 conversation between herself and Dylan, discussing songs to include in the then-upcoming Rolling Thunder Revue concerts:

"You gonna sing that song about robin's eggs and diamonds?" Bob had asked me on the first day of rehearsals.
"Which one?"
"You know, that one about blue eyes and diamonds..."
"Oh", I said, "you must mean 'Diamonds and Rust,' the song I wrote for my husband, David. I wrote it while he was in prison."
"For your husband?" Bob said.
"Yeah. Who did you think it was about?" I stonewalled.
"Oh, hey, what the fuck do I know?"
"Never mind. Yeah, I'll sing it, if you like."

But Baez's marriage to Harris had, in fact, already ended by the time the song was written and composed. In an interview with music writer Mike Ragogna, Baez later explained how Dylan's phone call had changed the development of the song:

MR: "Diamonds and Rust" was another magic moment. You've said when you began writing the song, it started as something else until Dylan phoned you. Then it became about him. That must have been one helluva call.
JB: He read me the entire lyrics to "Lily, Rosemary and the Jack of Hearts" that he'd just finished from a phone booth in the Midwest.
MR: What was the song about originally?
JB: I don't remember what I'd been writing about, but it had nothing to do with what it ended up as.

=== Dylan's reaction ===
Dylan included a scene of Baez performing the song live on the Rolling Thunder Revue in his 1978 film Renaldo and Clara. In the 2009 American Masters documentary Joan Baez: How Sweet the Sound, Dylan praised the song in an on-camera interview: "I love that song 'Diamonds & Rust'. I mean, to be included in something that Joan had written, whew, I mean, to this day it still impresses me".

== Variations ==
For her 1995 live recording Ring Them Bells, Baez performed the song as a duet with Mary Chapin Carpenter. In that performance, she changed the end lines: "And if you're / offering me diamonds and rust / I've already paid" to: "And if you ... well I'll take the diamonds." The line "I bought you some cufflinks, you brought me something" was changed to "I bought you some cufflinks, you brought troubles." And on February 25, 2009, in Austin, she sang it, "And if you ... well I'll take the Grammy." In 2010, she recorded it as a duet with Judy Collins on Collins's album Paradise. In 2018, during her Fare Thee Well Tour, she changed the line "Ten years ago / I bought you some cufflinks" to "Fifty years ago / I bought you some cufflinks".

== Charts ==
Chart (1972–2016)	Peak position
Canada Adult Contemporary (RPM)	14
Canada Top Singles (RPM)	61
US Adult Contemporary (Billboard)	5
US Billboard Hot 100	35

== Popular covers ==
"Diamonds and Rust"

Single by Judas Priest

from the album Sin After Sin
- B-side: "Dissident Agressor"
- Released: April 29, 1977
- Recorded: January – February 1977, Ramport Studios, Battersea
- Genre: Heavy metal; hard rock
- Length: 3:28
- Label: Columbia
- Songwriter: Joan Baez
- Producers: Roger Glover, Judas Priest

Judas Priest singles chronology
"The Ripper" (1976)	"Diamonds and Rust" (1977)	"Better by You, Better Than Me" (1978)

Judas Priest recorded a cover of "Diamonds & Rust", with some of the verses omitted, on their album Sin After Sin. It was originally recorded a year earlier for Sad Wings of Destiny, but it was eventually not included on that album. This early recording appears on the compilations The Best of Judas Priest and Hero, Hero, and some remasters of their first album Rocka Rolla. A live version of the song appears on the album Unleashed in the East. The concert DVD Rising in the East includes an acoustic performance that is closer to Baez's original version. The song remains a staple of Judas Priest live concert performances. Baez commented on the Judas Priest version:

I love that! I was so stunned when I first heard it. I thought it was wonderful. It's very rare for people to cover my songs. I think there are a couple of reasons. One is they're personal – they don't have a universal quality to them. And I think maybe it's because I've already sung them, and who wants to compete with that? But it's always flattering when somebody does.

Cover versions also have been recorded by Judy Collins, Justin Vivian Bond, Blackmore's Night, S.O.D., Great White, Taylor Mitchell, Sarah Chen, Thunderstone, and First Aid Kit.

The song has been sampled in two popular hip-hop songs, "Happiness" by Busdriver and "Upgrade Call" by Andre Nickatina. In both songs the original is pitch-warped to sound squeaky.

== In live performance ==
Baez has performed the song no fewer than 234 times in concert. After the conclusion of her "Farewell Tour", Baez performed the song as a duet with Lana Del Rey when she showed up as a surprise guest at a Del Rey concert in Berkeley, California on October 6, 2019, during her LA to the Moon Tour.
