= Tom Allom =

English record producer

Thomas James Allom is an English record producer and sound engineer. His best-known work was in the 1970s and 1980s, working with artists such as Judas Priest, Black Sabbath, Strawbs, Krokus, Loverboy, Def Leppard, Kix and Rough Cutt. Allom is a member of the Music Producers Guild.

== Discography ==
=== As sound engineer ===
Siren/Kevin Coyne

- 1969 – Siren featuring Kevin Coyne

Genesis

- 1969 – From Genesis to Revelation

Black Sabbath

- 1970 – Black Sabbath
- 1970 – Paranoid
- 1971 – Master of Reality

=== As producer ===
Strawbs

- 1973 – Bursting at the Seams
- 1974 – Ghosts
- 1974 – Hero and Heroine
- 1975 – Nomadness

Magna Carta

- 1974 – Martin's Cafe

Jack the Lad

- 1976 – Jackpot

George Hatcher Band

- 1976 – Dry Run
- 1977 – Talkin' Turkey
- 1977 – Have Band Will Travel EP

Pat Travers

- 1978 – Live! Go for What You Know

The Tourists

- 1979 – Reality Effect
- 1980 – Luminous Basement

Judas Priest

- 1979 – Unleashed in the East
- 1980 – British Steel
- 1981 – Point of Entry
- 1982 – Screaming for Vengeance
- 1984 – Defenders of the Faith
- 1986 – Turbo
- 1987 – Priest...Live!
- 1988 – Ram It Down
- 2009 – A Touch of Evil: Live
- 2016 – Battle Cry
- 2018 – Firepower
- 2024 – Rocka Rolla

Nantucket

- 1980 – Long Way to the Top

Def Leppard

- 1980 – On Through the Night

Doc Holliday

- 1980 – Doc Holliday
- 1981 – Doc Holliday Rides Again

Kix

- 1981 – Kix

Whitford/St. Holmes

- 1981 – Whitford/St. Holmes

Wolf

- 1982 – Head Contact (Rock 'n' Roll)

Cobra

- 1983 – First Strike

Krokus

- 1983 – Headhunter

Y & T

- 1984 – In Rock We Trust

Rough Cutt

- 1985 – Rough Cutt

Loverboy

- 1985 – Lovin' Every Minute of It

Urgent

- 1987 – Thinking Out Loud

Jetboy

- 1988 – Feel the Shake

The Works

- 1989 – From Out of Nowhere

Ashes & Diamonds

- 1993 – Heart of an Angel
