= Les Binks =

Northern Irish drummer (1951–2025)

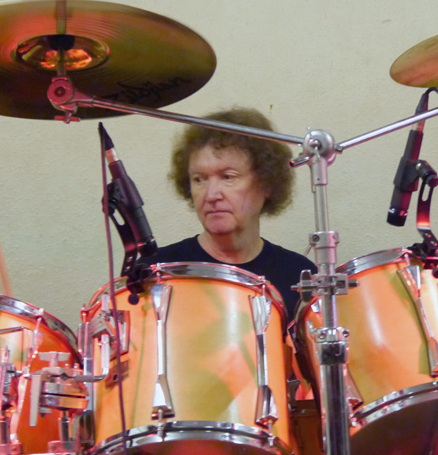
- Binks in 2016

Background information
- Born: James Leslie Binks; 6 July 1951; Portadown, Northern Ireland
- Died: 15 March 2025 (aged 73) London, England
- Genres: Heavy metal; hard rock
- Occupation: Drummer
- Years active: 1973–2025
- Formerly of: Judas Priest; Axis Point; Lionheart; Tytan; Fancy

James Leslie Binks (6 July 1951 – 15 March 2025) was a Northern Irish heavy metal drummer. He is best-known for being the drummer for Judas Priest, with whom he played from 1977 to 1979.

== Life and career ==
=== Early years ===
In an interview in 2017, Binks stated that amongst the main musical influences on his playing throughout his career were Mitch Mitchell, Jimi Hendrix, John Bonham, Ian Paice, Billy Cobham, Mahavishnu Orchestra, Lenny White, Chick Corea and Return to Forever, also mentioning his appreciation of early British rock and roll band, The Shadows.

Previously working for Eric Burdon of the Animals and the latin music-funk-R&B-soul-rock fusion band War, Binks was also a drummer on Deep Purple bassist Roger Glover's album The Butterfly Ball and the Grasshopper's Feast (1974). The album project began as a soundtrack for an animated film based on a well-known English children's book, but a promo for the film never gained any interest, so the project was scrapped. Glover went on to release the soundtrack as a "Roger Glover and Friends" title. One of the featured vocalists, Eddie Hardin previously of The Spencer Davis Group, later released his own albums, the first of which was Eddie Hardin's Wizard's Convention (1976), which again included Binks on drums.

Alongside session player Mo Foster and Ray Fenwick, later of Ian Gillan Band,Binks played for the pop band Fancy who had two U.S. hits in 1974 with a cover of Chip Taylor's "Wild Thing", and "Touch Me". Fancy's song "Feel Good" from the album Wild Thing has been sampled over one hundred times, most notably by Def Jam hip hop artists Beastie Boys on the song "3-Minute Rule" off their album Paul's Boutique (1989). Binks' drum break on "Feel Good" has also been sampled on "Walking in My Shoes" by Depeche Mode, and by Eric B. & Rakim on "Move the Crowd The Wild Bunch (sound system) Remix". The Wild Bunch, who sampled Les Binks' beats, were a collective composed of members of Massive Attack alongside vocalists such as Tricky (rapper).

=== Judas Priest ===
Through his connection to Roger Glover who had just wrapped up production of their album Sin After Sin, Binks joined the up-and-coming heavy metal act Judas Priest in March 1977 for their world tour – their first on American soil. Binks stepped into the role held briefly by noted session drummer Simon Phillips who had performed on Sin After Sin but did not wish to continue. Binks remained with Judas Priest for two and a half years, until July 1979, recording the studio albums Stained Class and Killing Machine (both 1978) and the live album Unleashed in the East (1979), all of which feature a faster thrash metal, speed metal double bass drumming approach, thus helping to develop and explore new terrain within heavy metal music, building on foundations already established by bands like Deep Purple on Fireball and Deep Purple in Rock.

"Exciter", The opening track on Stained Class featuring Bink's double bass drumming, is regarded as an important early influence on Thrash Metal, while the album as a whole is regarded as a significant influence on the New Wave of British Heavy Metal. Describing Binks' performance on the album, Loudwire magazine writes that "the breakneck-speed drumming by…Les Binks ( was ) carving metal's future…Binks, whose forceful work galvanizes this sound with a cavalcade of double kicks and manic fills, introduced himself and the album in the first five seconds of opening track, "Exciter." Regarded by many as the first speed metal song, "Exciter" sows the seeds of future thrash metal." Commenting on the production values on the album , Revolver magazine states that the sound engineer Dennis MacKay "not only wound up capturing the best Judas Priest drum sound to date on Stained Class, but he also helped the band achieve a tight sonic attack that was both impeccably clean and lethally powerful".

Whilst with Judas Priest, he received a writing credit for the song "Beyond the Realms of Death" from the album Stained Class. Binks made a home demo of the track with friend Steve Mann of the Michael Schenker Group helping on guitar, and at a band rehearsal he picked up a guitar to show them the song. The band loved the song and vocalist Rob Halford then crafted the song's lyrics and title.

Les Binks features prominently on Judas Priest's drum-dominated "Take On the World", released as a single in January 1979 and notable as the first Judas Priest single to chart in the UK top 40, reaching number 14. "Take on the World" was also later covered by new wave band The Human League on their 1980 tour. In 2021, the band Spoon released the single "Wild", which sampled Les Binks' drum patterns from "Take On the World." The record was also remixed by sound engineer dubplate producer, Dennis Bovell, featuring the same Les Binks' drum pattern.

Binks left the band just before the start of the North American leg of the "Killing Machine" (Hell Bent for Leather) tour. Binks said in 2017 that he left because he felt he was essentially hired as a "freelance session drummer" by the band and was never made an official member. He felt insulted when the band's then-manager Mike Dolan suggested that he "waive his fees" (i.e. not get paid for his performance) on the live album Unleashed in the East, a RIAA-certified platinum seller.

Speaking of the live album, Binks stated , "It's a classic heavy metal live album ... the songs on the Unleashed in the East period epitomizes ( sic) Priest at their best ... it has to be said Unleashed in the East is a great heavy metal album that personifies Judas Priest at their very best ... Contrary to what you may have read, we had no musical or personal differences at all. We shared the same musical direction and goals for the future of Judas Priest, and the reason I left was nothing to do with the band…This one is a touchy subject for me as the live in Tokyo album Unleashed in the East caused a rift between me and the band's manager and ultimately led to my decision to leave the band. I just didn't see the point in continuing to work with a band whose manager didn't want me to receive any payment for that live album."

=== Later career ===
Shortly after leaving Judas Priest , Binks was asked to record with Rory Gallagher, whom Binks had toured with when playing with the Joe O'Donnell (musician) Band. Binks says of that period that "(w)e rehearsed the material and then went into George Martin's Air London Studios in Oxford St…and recorded a few tracks ( but ) I don't know what happened to those recordings. I don't think they ever got released". Binks also toured with Hank Marvin of The Shadows.

In 1979, Binks joined Charlie Whitney and Axis Point and remained active in the British hard rock/heavy metal underground. In 1981, he was a member of Lionheart which featured Dennis Stratton (ex-Iron Maiden) on guitar and Jess Cox (ex-Tygers of Pan Tang) on vocals, though this was only a brief stint. Also in 1981, Binks played on the album Finardi by Italian rock singer Eugenio Finardi.

Binks toured with the bands Lionheart (1981) and Tytan (1982–1983) soon after their first single release.

After then, Binks appeared in a classic rock cover band around South London called The Shakers, with Dave Bunce, guitarist Pete Friesen (formerly with Jeff Beck and with Alice Cooper), and vocalist/guitarist Tom Lundy (of The Poor Mouth). Rounding out the band was bassist Phil Rynhart, co-founder member of The Poor Mouth. Binks and Pete Friesen have also done time in Metalworks, along with ex-Iron Maiden guitarist Tony Parsons, playing covers of Judas Priest, Iron Maiden, and other metal bands around London.

In 2013, he joined the band Raw Glory, which also featured singer Paul Manzi (of Arena).

In 2015, Binks played live around London in Broken Bones with ex-Bad II The Bone members Ed Hudson and Paul Smith, and in original prog-folk-rock band Kindred Spirit with whom he recorded the album Phoenix Rising.

From 2017, Binks performed classic Judas Priest songs live with a new band called Les Binks' Priesthood. He additionally intended to join the band KK's Priest after a one-time show in November 2019 playing Judas Priest songs at KK's Steelmill in Wolverhampton, along with other former Judas Priest members K. K. Downing (guitar) and Tim "Ripper" Owens (vocals). Other participants included David Ellefson (bass) of Megadeth and A.J. Mills (guitar) of the UK band Hostile. However, Binks reportedly suffered a fractured wrist prior to the recording of KK's Priest's first album in 2020, so he was replaced by Sean Elg (The Three Tremors).

=== Rock and Roll Hall of Fame ===
In 2022, Binks was inducted into the Rock and Roll Hall of Fame as a member of Judas Priest via the Award for Musical Excellence. On 14 October, K. K. Downing confirmed that he and Binks would be joining Judas Priest for a performance at the induction ceremony.

Binks played a three-song set with Judas Priest at their Rock and Roll Hall of Fame induction on 5 November 2022. This was one of Binks' last public performances before his death.

== Death ==
Binks died in London on 15 March 2025, at the age of 73. His death was confirmed on 14 April.

== Sources ==
- Daniels, Neil (2010). The Story of Judas Priest: Defenders of the Faith. New York City: Omnibus Press. ISBN 978-1-84772-707-7.
- Gillan, Ian; Cohen, David (1993). Child in Time : The Life Story of the Singer from Deep Purple. Smith Gryphon Limited. ISBN 1-85685-048-X.
- Robinson, Simon (1996). Fireball (25th anniversary reissue) (Media notes). EMI. 7243-8-53711-2-7.
- Weinstein, Deena (2000). Heavy Metal: The Music and Its Culture. Da Capo Press. ISBN 978-0-306-80970-5.
