= Alan Moore (drummer) =

English musician

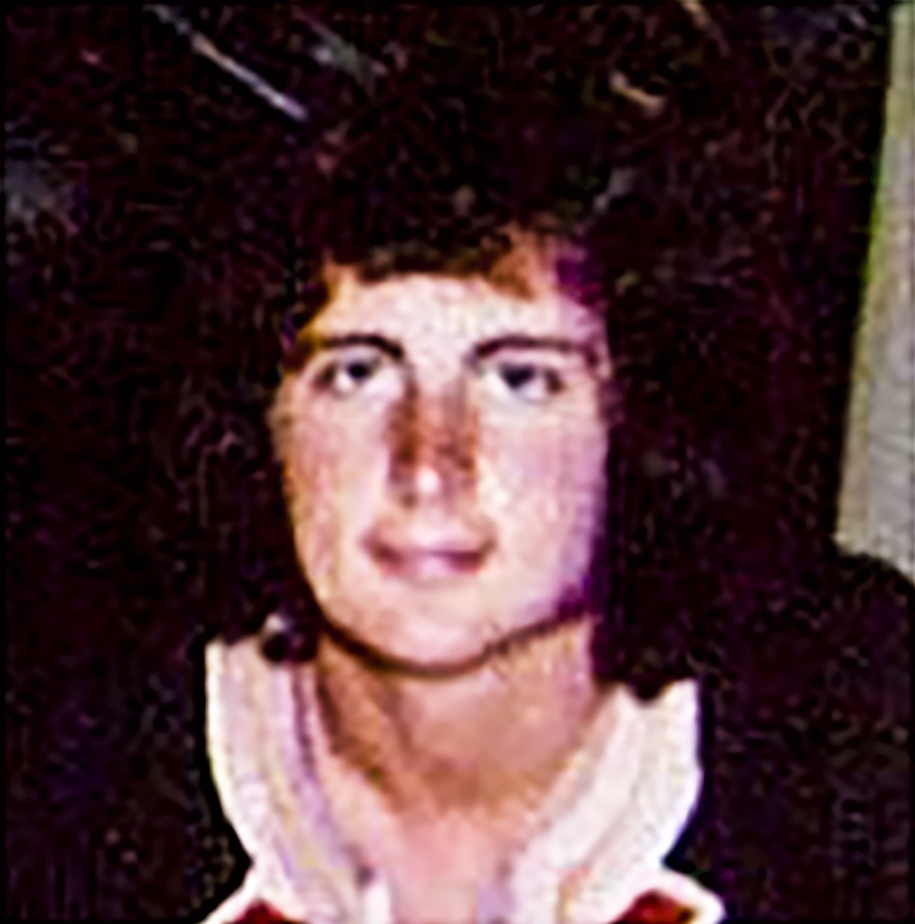

Background information
- Also known as: Skip
- Born: 1 January 1950 (age 76); Birmingham, Warwickshire, England
- Occupation: Musician
- Instrument: Drums
- Years active: 1971–1982?

Alan "Skip" Moore (born 1 January 1950) is an English musician who is best known for his time as drummer of the heavy metal band Judas Priest. He played on their second album, Sad Wings of Destiny (1976).

Moore was already active in the Birmingham rock, blues, folk and country scene, and played with numerous bands, including The Young Casuals, The Other Lot, The Outer Light, Gabriel Oak, Glad Stallion, Tendency Jones and Pendulum. He was first approached by the guitarist K. K. Downing and bass guitarist Ian Hill in 1971, and joined in the early and unofficial phase of the newborn Judas Priest for a period of about a year, while Al Atkins was still the vocalist. He left in 1972 to join the Birmingham country rock band Sundance, with whom he recorded the album Rain, Steam, Speed (1974), and the single "Coming Down".

Drummer John Hinch left Judas Priest in 1975, and Downing and Hill approached Moore again. For the second time, he joined the band, making him the only drummer in its history to have two separate stints. His first show after re-joining was in October 1975 at Slough College, London, during which guitarist Glenn Tipton introduced "our new drummer Skip" who "only had a few hours of rehearsal". In 1976, the band recorded the album Sad Wings of Destiny. Despite its success, Moore decided to leave again, permanently.

Moore continued to play with numerous other bands and recording sessions. In 1981, he signed to Ariola Records with the band R.P.M., releasing two singles, "Now That Summer's Here" and "Lost In Space". After moving out of London, he continued to play with various "scratch bands" and session musicians. He later left music altogether.

Over the years, several musical biographers, journalists, band members and fans had tried to trace him without success. In the official biography The Story of Judas Priest: Defenders of the Faith, the author Neil Daniels said that, at the time it was written, Moore was the only former member of the band whom he could not trace at all.

In 2016, Moore resurfaced as drummer in Isle of Wight's The Baggywrinkles Blues Band, with former Cozy Powell's Hammer member Frank Aiello.
