= Defenders of the Faith =

- Cover art by Doug Johnson

Studio album by Judas Priest
- Released: 13 January 1984
- Recorded: July–August 1983
- Studios: Ibiza Sound (Ibiza, Spain)
- Genre: Heavy metal
- Length: 38:46
- Label: Columbia
- Producer: Tom Allom

Judas Priest chronology
Screaming for Vengeance (1982)	Defenders of the Faith (1984)	Turbo (1986)

Singles from Defenders of the Faith
- 1. "Freewheel Burning" Released: 13 January 1984; 2. "Some Heads Are Gonna Roll" Released: 19 March 1984; 3. "Love Bites" Released: April 1984 (US)

Defenders of the Faith is the ninth studio album by English heavy metal band Judas Priest, released on 13 January 1984 in the US and on 20 January 1984 in the UK. The album was certified platinum by the RIAA, and spawned the singles "Freewheel Burning", "Some Heads Are Gonna Roll", and "Love Bites".

== Recording ==
Defenders of the Faith was recorded in July and August 1983 at Ibiza Sound Studios in Ibiza, Spain, and mixed from September through November 1983 at DB Recording Studios and Bayshore Recording Studios in Coconut Grove, Miami, Florida.

=== Packaging ===
The cover art by Doug Johnson (who also designed the Hellion in Screaming for Vengeance) depicts the Metallian, a horned, tiger-like land assault creature with Gatling guns and tank tracks conceptualized by the band. The back cover contains a message:

Rising from darkness where Hell hath no mercy and the screams for vengeance echo on forever. Only those who keep the faith shall escape the wrath of the Metallian ... Master of all metal.

== Musical style ==
Stylistically, Defenders of the Faith did not greatly depart from its predecessor and featured a similar formula of short, up-tempo metal anthems with stadium shout-along choruses, although progressive elements returned on some tracks such as "The Sentinel". The track "Rock Hard Ride Free" is actually a re-working of a track entitled "Fight for Your Life", recorded during the 1982 Screaming For Vengeance sessions but not included on that album.

== Release ==
The LP and cassette tape were released on 13 January 1984, and the album appeared on CD in July. A remastered CD was released in May 2001. Simultaneously with the album's release, the band kicked off their tour in Europe, with the bulk of concerts taking place in North America during the spring and summer.

The album was an immediate success, only going one spot below Screaming for Vengeance on the US Billboard 200 at No. 18, while also peaking at No. 19 in the UK. By the end of 1984, Defenders of the Faith sold more than 800,000 copies worldwide, and the album would go on to be certified platinum in the United States.

The 30th-anniversary release of the album (released in March 2015) came with a double CD of a live show recorded on 5 May 1984 at the Long Beach Arena in Long Beach, California on their Defenders of the Faith Tour and was originally recorded for a radio broadcast.

=== Promotion ===
In December 1983, the band did a short tour playing dates in the UK and Germany introducing new single "Freewheel Burning" in the set. In January 1984, the band embarked on the Metal Conqueror Tour across Europe, North America and Japan. On this tour, the band played every song from the album live, with the exception of "Eat Me Alive". During the band's 2008 tour in support of Nostradamus, they played many songs which had never been played live before, one of them being "Eat Me Alive". This made Defenders of the Faith the second Judas Priest album from which every song had been played live (the first being Rocka Rolla), followed by British Steel during the 2009, British Steel 30th anniversary tour.

== Reception ==
Professional ratings
Review scores
Source	Rating
AllMusic	4/5 stars
Blabbermouth.net	10/10 (30th Ann.)
Blogcritics	(favourable) (30th Ann.)
PopMatters	7/10(30th Ann.)
Martin Popoff	8/10
Record Collector	(30th Ann.)
Rolling Stone	3/5 stars
Sputnikmusic	4.0/5

The album was generally positively received by critics. However, some critics nonetheless objected to the lack of a standout single comparable to "Breaking the Law" or "You've Got Another Thing Comin'", and the album's general similarity to Screaming for Vengeance.

Writing for Allmusic, Steve Huey hailed the album as, "The last quality album from Judas Priest's commercial period," while still conceding, "Defenders of the Faith doesn't quite reach the heights of British Steel or Screaming for Vengeance, in part because it lacks a standout single on the level of those two records' best material. That said, even if there's a low percentage of signature songs here, there's a remarkably high percentage of hidden gems waiting to be unearthed, making Defenders possibly the most underrated record in Priest's catalog."

=== Controversy ===
"Eat Me Alive" was listed at number 3 on the Parents Music Resource Center's "Filthy Fifteen", a list of 15 songs the organization found most objectionable. PMRC co-founder Tipper Gore stated the song was about oral sex at gunpoint. In response to the allegations, Priest recorded the song "Parental Guidance" on the follow-up album Turbo.

In a uniquely British way, Rob's S&M lyrics were intended to be tongue in cheek—and certainly not "corrupting", as Tipper Gore and the Parents Music Resource Center (PMRC) took them to be. They certainly didn't warrant being included on the PMRC's "Filthy 15" list a few months after the album was released. For us, the song was a bit of fun—but I won’t deny that we included it with full knowledge that it would get media attention. Little did we know at that time that its inclusion on the "Filthy 15" would be the precursor to a far more disturbing predicament for us.

— K.K. Downing (guitarist)

== Track listing ==
All tracks are written by Glenn Tipton, Rob Halford and K. K. Downing, except "Some Heads Are Gonna Roll" by Bob Halligan Jr.

Side one
No.	Title	Length
1.	"Freewheel Burning"	4:22
2.	"Jawbreaker"	3:26
3.	"Rock Hard Ride Free"	5:34
4.	"The Sentinel"	5:04

Side two
No.	Title	Length
5.	"Love Bites"	4:47
6.	"Eat Me Alive"	3:34
7.	"Some Heads Are Gonna Roll"	4:05
8.	"Night Comes Down"	3:59
9.	"Heavy Duty"	2:25
10.	"Defenders of the Faith"	1:30
Total length:		38:46

2001 CD edition bonus tracks
No.	Title	Length
11.	"Turn On Your Light" (Recorded during the 1985 Turbo sessions)	5:23
12.	"Heavy Duty/Defenders of the Faith" (Live at Long Beach Arena, Long Beach, California; 5 May 1984)	5:26
Total length:		49:35

30th Anniversary Edition – Bonus Live CDs

All tracks are written by Glenn Tipton, Rob Halford and K. K. Downing, unless otherwise noted.

Disc one
No.	Title	Length
1.	"Love Bites"	5:16
2.	"Jawbreaker"	3:57
3.	"Grinder"	4:30
4.	"Metal Gods"	4:20
5.	"Breaking the Law"	2:57
6.	"Sinner"	8:11
7.	"Desert Plains"	5:04
8.	"Some Heads Are Gonna Roll" (Bob Halligan Jr.)	4:30
9.	"The Sentinel"	6:07
10.	"Rock Hard Ride Free"	6:04

Disc two
No.	Title	Length
1.	"Night Comes Down"	4:28
2.	"The Hellion"	0:39
3.	"Electric Eye"	3:33
4.	"Heavy Duty"	2:33
5.	"Defenders of the Faith"	2:37
6.	"Freewheel Burning"	4:39
7.	"Victim of Changes" (Al Atkins, Downing, Halford, Tipton)	9:43
8.	"The Green Manalishi (With the Two-Pronged Crown)" (Peter Green)	5:46
9.	"Living After Midnight"	4:50
10.	"Hell Bent For Leather" (Tipton)	5:55
11.	"You've Got Another Thing Comin'"	8:51

== Personnel ==
Judas Priest

- Rob Halford – vocals
- K. K. Downing – guitars
- Glenn Tipton – guitars
- Ian Hill – bass guitar
- Dave Holland – drums

Lead Guitar Credits

- Freewheel Burning – Tipton
- Jawbreaker – Downing
- Rock Hard Ride Free – Intro: Tipton, Harmony section: both, Lead break: Downing/Tipton, Harmony section at the end: both
- The Sentinel – Split into seven sections: Tipton/Downing/Tipton/Downing/Tipton/Downing/both
- Eat Me Alive – Split into four equal quarters: Downing/Tipton/Downing/Tipton
- Some Heads Are Gonna Roll – Split into two Tipton/Downing
- Night Comes Down – both

Production

- Produced by Tom Allom
- Engineered by Mark Dodson, assisted by Christian Eser, Bruce Hensal, David Roeder, Ben King, and Buddy Thornton
- Cover design by Doug Johnson, based on a concept by Judas Priest

== Charts ==
Chart (1984–85)	Peak position
Canada Top Albums/CDs (RPM)	17
Dutch Albums (Album Top 100)	27
Finnish Albums (The Official Finnish Charts)	10
German Albums (Offizielle Top 100)	21
Japanese Albums (Oricon)	18
Norwegian Albums (VG-lista)	17
Swedish Albums (Sverigetopplistan)	2
Swiss Albums (Schweizer Hitparade)	12
UK Albums (Official Charts)	19
US Billboard 200	18

Chart (2014–15)	Peak position
Austrian Albums (Ö3 Austria)	51
Belgian Albums (Ultratop Flanders)	138
Belgian Albums (Ultratop Wallonia)	85
Finnish Albums (Suomen virallinen lista)	46
Italian Albums (FIMI)	90
Spanish Albums (Promusicae)	66
UK Rock & Metal Albums (Official Charts)	13

== Certifications ==
Region	Certification	Certified units/sales
Canada (Music Canada)	2× Platinum	200,000^{^}
Japan (RIAJ)	Gold	100,000^{^}
United States (RIAA)	Platinum	1,000,000^{^}
^{^} Shipments figures based on certification alone.
