= Sin After Sin =

Studio album by Judas Priest
- Released: 8 April 1977
- Recorded: January 1977
- Studio: Ramport (London)
- Genre: Heavy metal
- Length: 40:36
- Label: Columbia
- Producers: Roger Glover; Judas Priest

Judas Priest chronology
Sad Wings of Destiny (1976)	Sin After Sin (1977)	Stained Class (1978)

Singles from Sin After Sin
- 1. "Diamonds & Rust" Released: 29 April 1977; 2. "Dissident Aggressor" Released: 1977 (Japan)

Sin After Sin is the third studio album by English heavy metal band Judas Priest, released on 8 April 1977 by Columbia Records, and on 22 April in the UK, by CBS Records. Produced by Deep Purple bassist Roger Glover, it was the band's major label debut, their first album for the label, and their only album to feature drummer Simon Phillips, a studio musician who replaced drummer Alan Moore for the recording sessions.

The album continues the revolutionary direction the band first took on Sad Wings of Destiny, this time incorporating elements that would later define thrash metal and speed metal, particularly on the songs "Let Us Prey/Call of the Priest" and "Dissident Aggressor". Despite this, and positive critical and commercial reception, the album has failed to achieve the acclaim Sad Wings of Destiny and their follow-up album, Stained Class have received.

== Background ==
After releasing their first two albums on the small Gull label, Judas Priest grew dissatisfied with what they saw as a lack of financial support from their record company. Their previous album, Sad Wings of Destiny, caught the attention of CBS Records, and with the help of new manager David Hemmings, the band signed with CBS and received a £60,000 budget for the follow-up album, which was to draw its title phrase "sin after sin" from the lyrics to the song "Genocide" from the Sad Wings album. The move to CBS required breaking their contract with Gull, and once the legal dust had settled the band had forfeited the rights to those first two albums and all related recordings to Gull.

== Production ==
Rehearsals for the Sin After Sin sessions took place at Pinewood Studios in London, with recording commencing in January 1977 at the Who's Ramport Studios in the Battersea district of London. Deep Purple bassist Roger Glover was hired to produce the album with Mark Dodson as engineer. The band's studio experiences while with Gull were less than satisfying, particularly during the mixing of Rocka Rolla, and they were initially quite keen to produce Sin After Sin themselves. CBS, however, insisted on an experienced producer. Roger Glover was suggested and the band agreed, but after one session the band fired Glover, informing him that they would continue on their own. After a few weeks of struggling with unsatisfactory recordings, the band recalled Glover and the sessions began anew, with only six allotted days remaining. It was also during this period that the band parted ways with drummer Alan Moore, feeling that his technique was too limited for their evolving sound. Session drummer Simon Phillips was brought in by Glover to finish the sessions.

== Content ==
The album includes a cover of the Joan Baez song "Diamonds & Rust", a decision which was encouraged by Glover in the interest of adding a track with commercial potential. Indeed, "Diamonds & Rust" was the first song by Judas Priest to receive radio play, and Baez herself reportedly enjoyed the cover. This was the band's second attempt to cover the track, and the earlier version from the Gull Records era was only released in 1978 on the compilation album The Best of Judas Priest and as a bonus track on the 1987 reissue of Rocka Rolla.

The "brazenly homoerotic" song "Raw Deal" has been described as vocalist Rob Halford's coming-out song, and a "heavy metal gay rights song". Halford came out as a gay man in 1998.

== Packaging and artwork ==
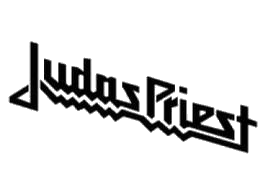
Sin After Sin would be the final Judas Priest album prior to the band adopting its new, now well known logo (pictured)

Sin After Sin was the final Judas Priest studio album to feature their original "gothic cursive font" logo, though it would be used on later Gull Records reissues of their pre–Sin After Sin material.

The mausoleum depicted on the Sin After Sin album cover is based on a photograph of the Egyptianate mausoleum built in 1910 for Colonel Alexander Gordon, located on the grounds of Putney Vale Cemetery in London. The artwork is by Rosław Szaybo.

This was the first (in order of release) of Judas Priest's main albums to be remastered in 2001, which included all of the albums between this and their 1990 Painkiller album. The remaster corrected an error in the track listing; "Call for the Priest", which forms one track with "Let Us Prey", had erroneously been listed as forming one track with "Raw Deal" until then.

== Release ==
The album was released on 8 April 1977. Sin After Sin was Judas Priest's most commercially successful release to date, reaching number 23 in the UK Albums Chart. That success was difficult to duplicate in the US where Sin After Sin failed to chart. At home, they also faced a somewhat hostile reception or were outright ignored by a music press which was at that time heavily focused on the new genre of punk rock which swept Britain in the late 1970s. By the end of 1977, Sin After Sin sold more than 47,000 units in the US, and by 1981 sales reached 152,000 copies Though it would take several years, Sin After Sin is the first of eleven consecutive Judas Priest albums to be certified gold or higher by the RIAA.

=== Touring ===
With major label support, Sin After Sin marked Judas Priest's first-ever opportunity to tour the United States, where they served as the opening act for REO Speedwagon and Foreigner.

As session drummer Simon Phillips had commitments to Jack Bruce, he declined to join Judas Priest as a permanent member. As a result, former Fancy drummer Les Binks was hired for the subsequent tour. An acquaintance of producer Glover, Binks was able to play double bass drums, and was one of the few drummers who could replicate Phillips' drum parts live.

A live tape from their headlining show in Croydon on 1 May 1977 shows that all the album's songs except one, "Last Rose of Summer", were played on the 1977 tour. "Raw Deal" and "Here Come the Tears" were only played at headlining shows and permanently retired after this tour, "Let Us Prey/Call for the Priest" was also played a few times in 1978, "Sinner" and "Diamonds and Rust" became regulars on future setlists while "Starbreaker" and "Dissident Aggressor" returned to the band's setlists after a lengthy absence, in 2011 and 2008 respectively.

== Reception ==
Professional ratings
Review scores
Source	Rating
AllMusic	4/5 stars
The Encyclopedia of Popular Music	3/5 stars
Record Collector	4/5 stars
The Rolling Stone Album Guide	2.5/5 stars

Sin After Sin has generally received positive reception since its release, though it is not as acclaimed as its predecessor, Sad Wings of Destiny, or its successor, Stained Class. Steve Huey of Allmusic would comment, "Despite the undeniably tremendous peaks here, the overall package doesn't cohere quite as well as on Sad Wings of Destiny, simply because the heavy moments are so recognizable as the metal we know today that the detours stick out as greater interruptions of the album's flow."

== Legacy ==
Sin After Sin introduced the combination of the double bass drumming and rapid sixteenth-note bass rhythms combined with rapid sixteenth-note guitar rhythms that would come to define heavy metal in later years, particularly the thrash metal sub-genre which emerged in the 1980s. The track "Dissident Aggressor" was an early example of the tempo and aggression which would soon become synonymous with the New Wave of British Heavy Metal. Author Andrew L. Cope has described Sin After Sin as a key album in the development of heavy metal technique, in particular for its use of double kick drumming.

Anthrax guitarist Scott Ian has been quoted as saying that Mark Dodson's engineering work on this album (and later on 1984's Defenders of the Faith) inspired the band to hire him to produce their 1988 album State of Euphoria.

The band Starbreaker, formed in 2005 and led by TNT vocalist Tony Harnell, whose singing style was heavily influenced by Rob Halford in his formative years, named themselves after the song "Starbreaker".

The German band Sinner took its name from the song "Sinner", and its vocalist/bassist Mat Sinner, born Matthias Lasch, derived his stage name from the same song. In 1997, Mat Sinner formed another band, Primal Fear, whose lead vocalist Ralf Scheepers was considered by Judas Priest as a replacement for Rob Halford during the period that Halford was not in the band.

The titles of the first two albums by K. K. Downing's band KK's Priest, Sermons of the Sinner and The Sinner Rides Again, were both inspired by the song "Sinner".

== Track listing ==
Side one
No.	Title	Writer(s)	Length
1.	"Sinner"	Rob Halford, Glenn Tipton	6:45
2.	"Diamonds and Rust"	Joan Baez	3:27
3.	"Starbreaker"	Halford, K. K. Downing, Tipton	4:49
4.	"Last Rose of Summer"	Halford, Tipton	5:37

Side two
No.	Title	Writer(s)	Length
5.	"Let Us Prey/Call for the Priest"	Halford, Downing, Tipton	6:12
6.	"Raw Deal"	Halford, Tipton	6:00
7.	"Here Come the Tears"	Halford, Tipton	4:36
8.	"Dissident Aggressor"	Halford, Downing, Tipton	3:07
Total length:			40:36

2001 bonus tracks
No.	Title	Writer(s)	Length
9.	"Race with the Devil" (The Gun cover, recorded during the Stained Class sessions)	Adrian Gurvitz	3:06
10.	"Jawbreaker" (Live at Long Beach Arena, Long Beach, California; 5 May 1984)	Halford, Downing, Tipton	4:02
Total length:			47:44

== Personnel ==
Judas Priest

- Rob Halford – vocals
- K. K. Downing – guitars
- Glenn Tipton – guitars, piano on "Here Come the Tears", arrangements on "Diamonds and Rust", organ on "Let Us Prey"
- Ian Hill – bass guitar

Additional musicians

- Simon Phillips – drums, percussion (credited as "special thanks to")
- Les Binks – drums (Track 9)
- Dave Holland – drums (Track 10)

Production

- Wessex Sound Studios – mixing location
- Produced by Roger Glover and Judas Priest
- Engineered by Mark Dodson
- Art direction by Rosław Szaybo
- Design and photography by Bob Carlos Clarke

== Charts ==
Chart (1977)	Peak position
Swedish Albums (Sverigetopplistan)	49
UK Albums (Official Charts)	23

== Certifications ==
Region	Certification	Certified units/sales
United States (RIAA)	Gold	500,000^{^}
^{^} Shipments figures based on certification alone.
