= Sad Wings of Destiny =

Studio album by Judas Priest
- Released: 26 March 1976
- Recorded: November–December 1975
- Studio: Rockfield (Rockfield, Wales)
- Genre: Heavy metal
- Length: 39:12
- Label: Gull
- Producers: Jeffery Calvert, Max West, Judas Priest

Judas Priest chronology
Rocka Rolla (1974)	Sad Wings of Destiny (1976)	Sin After Sin (1977)

Singles from Sad Wings of Destiny
- 1. "The Ripper" Released: 19 March 1976 (UK); 2. "Deceiver" Released: March 1977 (Japan)

Sad Wings of Destiny is the second studio album by English heavy metal band Judas Priest, released on 26 March 1976 by Gull Records. It is considered the album on which Judas Priest consolidated their sound and image, and songs from it such as "Victim of Changes" and "The Ripper" have since become live standards. It was the band's only album to feature drummer Alan Moore on every track.

Noted for its riff-driven sound and the wide range of Rob Halford's vocals, the album displays a wide variety of styles, moods and textures, inspired by an array of groups such as Queen, Led Zeppelin, Deep Purple and Black Sabbath. The centrepiece "Victim of Changes" is a nearly eight-minute track featuring heavy riffing trading off with high-pitched vocals, extended guitar leads, and a slow, moody breakdown toward the end. "Tyrant" and "The Ripper" are short, dense, high-powered rockers with many parts and changes. Riffs and solos dominate "Genocide", "Island of Domination", and "Deceiver", and the band finds more laid-back moments in the crooning piano-backed "Epitaph" and the moody "Dreamer Deceiver".

Sad Wings of Destiny had a positive reception but weak sales. The band recorded their first two albums with the independent Gull label under tight budgets; after living off a single meal per day while working side jobs to support themselves, the group grew frustrated with the financial situation and signed with CBS Records for their next album, Sin After Sin (1977). Breaking their contract resulted in the rights to Sad Wings of Destiny and its demo recordings falling into Gull's hands. In retrospect, the album has received acclaim as one of the most important albums in heavy metal history, with the album's image and style going on to influence many later metal bands, as well as later Judas Priest albums.

== Background ==
Judas Priest formed in September 1969 in industrial West Bromwich, Birmingham by lead vocalist/founding Al Atkins and bass guitarist/co-founding Brian "Bruno" Steppenhill, who chose the band's name, wanting one similar to Black Sabbath's. The bands were contemporaries and were both from Birmingham, though Judas Priest failed to find a significant audience until Black Sabbath began to leave the local spotlight following the international success of their first album. The band's guitarists Glenn Tipton and K. K. Downing have said the heavy riffing and complexity of the song arrangements were inspired by the factories of Birmingham.

By the time Judas Priest's first album, Rocka Rolla, was released in 1974, there had been so many lineup changes that K.K Downing and Ian Hill were the only remaining original members. The first album displayed a mix of styles from a wide variety of influences, but the band found the performance and production disappointing. The band gigged occasionally through 1975, at times sharing the stage with bands such as Pink Fairies and UFO. Drummer John Hinch left the band for reasons that are disputed and was replaced with Alan Moore in October 1975, who had drummed in an early incarnation of the band.

The band performed the "Dreamer Deceiver"–"Deceiver" pair on BBC Two's The Old Grey Whistle Test the year before the songs appeared on Sad Wings of Destiny. They were frustrated with the BBC's volume restrictions, as high volume is a key component in producing a heavy-metal sound. The band had yet to develop the studs-and-leather image that was to become their trademark; instead, they wore contemporary mid-1970s fashions, including high-heeled boots and frilled shirts, and a long-haired Halford donned a pink satin top which he later said he borrowed from his sister. By 1976, Halford joked that fans should burn their copies of Rocka Rolla.

Finances were tight: the record label Gull provided a recording budget of £2,000 for each of the band's first two albums. During the recording of Sad Wings of Destiny, band members restricted themselves to one meal a day, and several took on part-time work: Tipton as a gardener, Downing in a factory, and Hill driving a delivery van. The group went into the studio with the intention of making an album that mixed straight-ahead rock with a progressive edge.

== Production ==
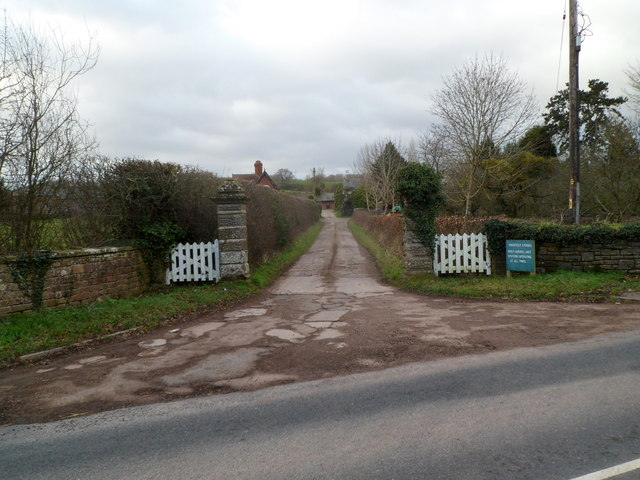
Recording took place at Rockfield Studios in Wales in November and December 1975.

Recording took place over two weeks in November and December 1975 at Rockfield Studios in Wales with producers Jeffrey Calvert and Gereint "Max West" Hughes, and Chris Tsangarides as co-engineer. Calvert and Hughes were the main members of the pop group Typically Tropical who topped the UK charts in 1975 with "Barbados", Gull's first hit. The band stayed sober during the recording sessions, which lasted from 3:00 pm until 3:00 am. Mixing took a week at Morgan Studios in London.

David Howells of Gull Records commissioned Patrick Woodroffe to provide the cover art, a piece called Fallen Angel depicting a struggling, grounded angel surrounded by flames and wearing a devil's three-pronged cross, which was the band's symbol. Halford posed Christ-like on the reverse, and Gothic fonts adorned the front and back.

== Songs ==
Victim of Changes

"Victim of Changes"
"Victim of Changes" became a Judas Priest standard.

The nearly eight-minute "Victim of Changes" displays a wide dynamic range in rhythm, texture, and mood, with heavy riffing, a melodic ballad section, and extended guitar leads. An almost classical-sounding twin-guitar introduction leads to the violent main riff. The lyrics tell of a woman whose hard-drinking results in losing her man to another woman. Inspired by Led Zeppelin's "Black Dog", the heavy riff alternates with a cappella passages, Halford breaking into screaming falsettos during the slow break and dramatic conclusion of the song.

The track began as two songs: "Whiskey Woman" and "Red Light Lady". "Whiskey Woman" was an early Priest song by Downing and Atkins that the band chose not to include on their first album, though it had long been a crowd-pleasing opener at live shows and features on early demo recordings. To this the band wove in the slow "Red Light Lady", a song Halford brought with him from his previous band, Hiroshima.

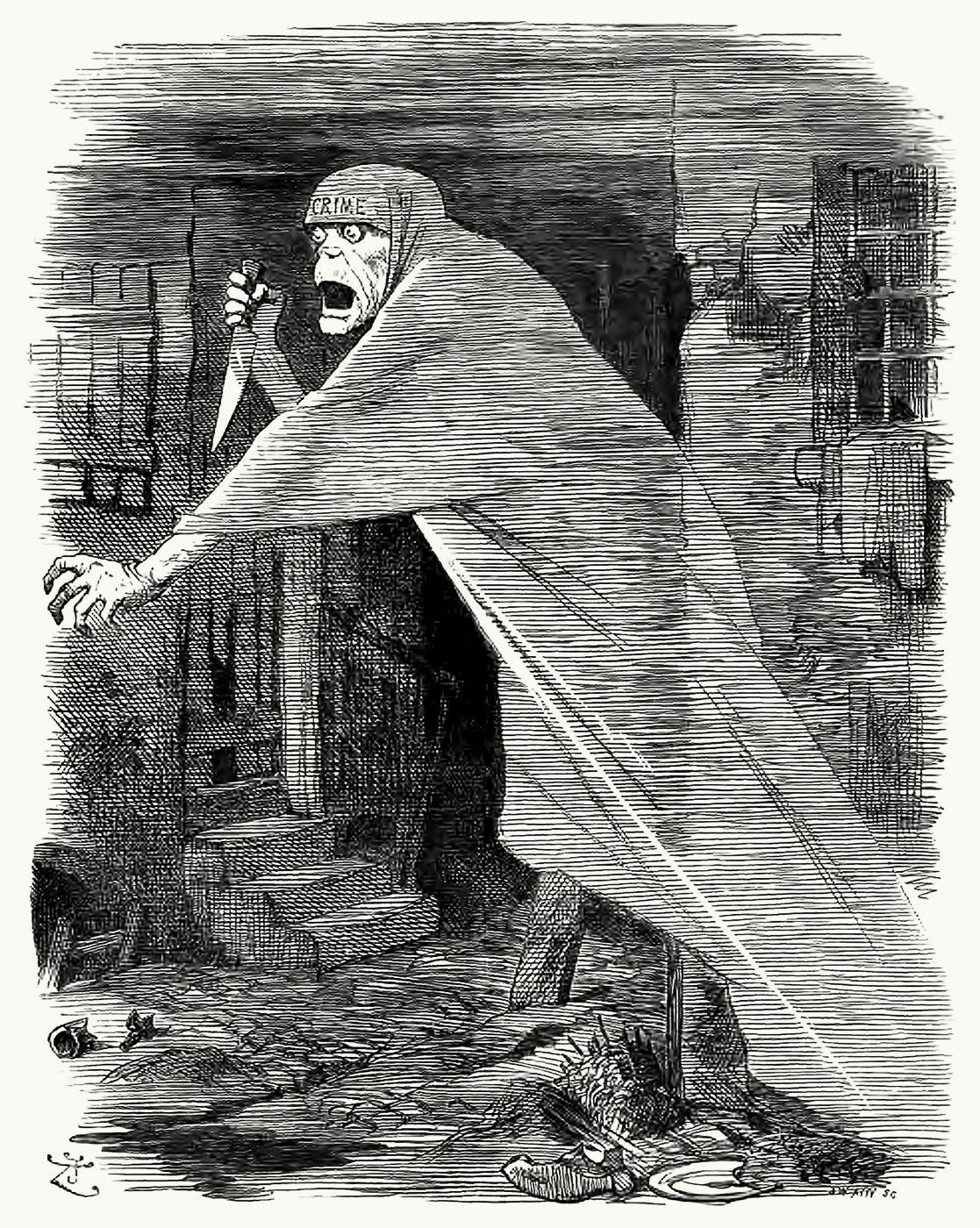
"The Ripper" is written from the point of view of the Victorian serial killer Jack the Ripper (depicted here in a contemporary drawing entitled "The Nemesis of Neglect" by John Tenniel from 1888).

The Ripper

A busy, chugging, riff-heavy rocker, "The Ripper" features arrangements inspired by Queen–particularly in the high-pitched layered opening vocals and classical-tinged twin guitars. The lyrics of the Tipton-penned track are from the point of view of Victorian serial killer Jack the Ripper.

Dreamer Deceiver

A slow ballad with crooning vocals and screaming lead soloing, the song serves as introduction to the heavy "Deceiver" which follows it. Atkins originally received partial credit for both tracks, but disclaimed involvement in them; later releases removed it.

Deceiver

A heavy song with a chugging riff presaging the technical style of speed metal, "Deceiver" features energetic soloing and a heavy, Black Sabbath-like break with soaring, high-pitched vocals, climaxing in a repetitive acoustic closing.

Prelude

"Prelude" is a short baroque instrumental, alternating between the tonic and dominant, and is arranged for piano, synthesizer, guitars, and tom-tom drums. Despite the title, "Prelude" is musically unrelated to the following track, "Tyrant".

Tyrant

A heavy track full of many parts and tempo changes, Halford has said "Tyrant" expresses his "aversion towards any form of control".

Genocide

A forward-looking, riff-heavy rocker, bearing the influence of heavy rockers such as the Deep Purple tracks "Woman from Tokyo" and "Burn". Halford expressed hope that the song's "strong and graphic" lyrics would "be provocative and somewhat controversial and to stimulate people". The phrase "sin after sin" from the lyrics to "Genocide" provided the title to the band's next album.

Epitaph

A quiet track with piano backing and Queen-like layered vocals, Halford said the lyrics to "Epitaph" express frustration at a lack of place for the young or old in modern cities.

Island of Domination

The side-closing "Island of Domination" is a heavy rocker with a complex riff in a style reminiscent of Black Sabbath. Downing described the lyrics as personal to Halford, joking of their having "probably a few innuendoes".

== Release ==
Sad Wings of Destiny was released 26 March 1976, and seven days earlier "The Ripper" appeared as a single backed with "Island of Domination".

The album was initially published and distributed by Janus Records in the United States.

The album had the A-side and B-side reversed, so that "Prelude" opens the second side and "Victim of Changes" the first, while the sleeve has "Prelude" opening the first side.

The album had little commercial success at first and had difficulty getting noticed due to critical competition from the rise of punk rock. The band supported the album with a headlining tour of the UK from 6 April to 20 June 1976. (Note: The band also headlined a single show in July 1976 at the Roundhouse.)

The album was awarded a gold record in 1989. Sad Wings of Destiny arrived at the same time as other influential metal albums from the late 70's – the same year saw the release of Rising from Ritchie Blackmore's Rainbow and Virgin Killer from Scorpions.

The band had grown dissatisfied with Gull; the tight finances led Moore to leave the band a second time—this time permanently.

The album caught the attention of CBS Records, and with the help of new manager David Hemmings, the band signed with CBS and received a £60000 budget for their next record, Sin After Sin (1977). Downing described how the disappointed feelings the group had over Gull's management influenced the dark themes that appeared on Sad Wings of Destiny.

The signing required breaking their contract with Gull, resulting in the rights to the first two albums and all related recordings—including demos—becoming property of Gull.

Gull periodically repackaged and re-released the material from these albums, such as on the 1981 double album Hero, Hero.

For the most part, the band was to abandon the progressive rock elements of their first two albums for a more straight-ahead heavy rock sound; the band revisited these progressive elements in 2008 on the album Nostradamus.

Sad Wings of Destiny was reissued as part of the band's limited edition 50 Heavy Metal Years of Music box-set, released in October 2021, through Sony Music Entertainment and Legacy Recordings, marking its release for the first time in the group's current label.

In mid-2026, it was announced that the album would receive a 50th-anniversary reissue through current guitarist Ritchie Faulkner's label, Exciter Records, on 2 October. The album would feature "Prelude" as its first track, rather than "Victim of Changes", and CD pressings would include the outtake version of "Diamonds and Rust" as a bonus track.

== Reception and legacy ==
Professional ratings
Review scores
Source	Rating
AllMusic	4/5 stars
Sputnikmusic	5/5 stars
The New Rolling Stone Album Guide	2/5 stars

Fans, critics, and the band have come to see Sad Wings of Destiny as the album on which Judas Priest consolidated their sound and image. In Rolling Stone Kris Nicholson gave the album a positive review, comparing it favourably to Deep Purple's Machine Head of 1972. Martin Popoff cites the album's "reinvention" of the heavy metal genre. The technical dexterity and operatic vocals pointed toward trends in heavy metal that new wave of British heavy metal bands such as Iron Maiden were to follow, and the album's dark themes reappeared in the 1980s American thrash metal, such as in the music of Slayer and Metallica. An early sign of the band's influence was that Van Halen included "Victim of Changes" in their sets before achieving fame. Dave Mustaine of Megadeth relates that his brother-in-law, a religious man, punched him in the face for listening to Sad Wings of Destiny; Mustaine called this a turning point, where he chose heavy metal as a career as "revenge". Mikael Åkerfeldt of Opeth named Sad Wings of Destiny his second favourite metal album. PopMatters described the album as "not-at-all shabby" and listed "Epitaph" as one of its "25 Best Progressive Rock Songs of All Time" in 2011. Halford has called the album his favourite of the band's.

"Victim of Changes", "The Ripper", "Tyrant", and "Genocide"—with an extended introduction—appear on the band's first live album, Unleashed in the East (1979). The first three of those songs have survived until 2019 in the band's setlists, with "Victim of Changes" being one of the band's most played songs ever, while "Genocide" got retired in the early 1980s until a revival in 2022. With "Dreamer Deceiver", "Deceiver" and "Island of Domination" present on 1975–76 set lists, 7 of the album's 9 songs have been performed in concert.

During the Sad Wings sessions, Howells encouraged the band to work on a heavy metal cover of "Diamonds & Rust" by folk singer Joan Baez, but it did not appear on the album. The band had a hit in the UK with a re-recording of the cover version the following year, after they had moved to CBS Records. Gull released the version from the Sad Wings sessions in 1978 on the compilation album The Best of Judas Priest.

Judas Priest's 1990 album Painkiller features a winged figure Halford has described as a futuristic version of the Fallen Angel from the Sad Wings of Destiny cover. The band's 2005 album Angel of Retribution—with Halford again in the band—revives the Fallen Angel again: the cover concept has the angel rise and seek retribution, and the song "Judas Rising" has him cast off his gloom and rise in optimism.

After Halford left the group in the 1990s, Tim Owens was hired to replace him after auditioning "Victim of Changes" and "The Ripper". Downing and Tipton thereafter nicknamed Owens "The Ripper". Judas Priest's original singer Al Atkins recorded a version of "Victim of Changes" for his album Victim of Changes of 1998. Judas Priest frequently performed the song "Mother Sun" during the Sad Wings era, but never recorded it. The ballad, with its Queen-like vocals, has survived only in bootleg recordings. In 2014 Swedish metal band Portrait released a cover version as a B-side on a 2014 CD single.

== Track listing ==
Side A
No.	Title	Writer(s)	Length
1.	"Victim of Changes"	Al Atkins, Glenn Tipton, Rob Halford, K. K. Downing	7:47
2.	"The Ripper"	Tipton	2:50
3.	"Dreamer Deceiver"	Halford, Downing, Tipton, Atkins	5:51
4.	"Deceiver"	Halford, Downing, Tipton	2:40

Side B
No.	Title	Writer(s)	Length
5.	"Prelude"	Tipton	2:02
6.	"Tyrant"	Halford, Tipton	4:28
7.	"Genocide"	Halford, Downing, Tipton	5:51
8.	"Epitaph"	Tipton	3:08
9.	"Island of Domination"	Halford, Downing, Tipton	4:32
Total length:			39:12

The Sad Wings of Destiny disc of the seventeen-disc Complete Albums Collection from 2012 puts the Side B tracks before those from "Side A", matching the track listing from the original album's back cover. "Prelude" did not appear on some pressings.

== Personnel ==
Personnel adapted from Sad Wings of Destiny liner notes

Judas Priest

- Rob Halford – vocals
- K. K. Downing – guitars
- Glenn Tipton – guitars, piano, organ, synthesiser on "Prelude"
- Ian Hill – bass guitar
- Alan Moore – drums

Production

- Produced by Jeffrey Calvert, Max West, and Judas Priest
- Engineered by Jeffrey Calvert, Max West, and Chris Tsangarides
- Cover concept by Neil French; painting by Patrick Woodroffe
- Art direction by John Pasche
- Band photographs by Lorentz Gullachsen and Alan Johnson

== Charts ==
Chart performance for Sad Wings of Destiny
Chart (2026)	Peak position
Scottish Albums (Official Charts)	50
UK Albums Sales (Official Charts)	83
UK Independent Albums (Official Charts)	34
UK Rock & Metal Albums (Official Charts)	11
