= Victim of Changes =

Song by Judas Priest

from the album Sad Wings of Destiny
- Released: 23 March 1976
- Recorded: November–December 1975
- Studio: Rockfield, Wales
- Genre: Heavy metal, progressive metal
- Length: 7:47
- Label: Gull
- Songwriter(s): Al Atkins; Rob Halford; K. K. Downing; Glenn Tipton
- Producer(s): Jeffery Calvert; Max West; Judas Priest

"Victim of Changes" is a song by English heavy metal band Judas Priest, featured on their 1976 studio album Sad Wings of Destiny. Adrien Begrand, writing for PopMatters, noted that the song changed the course of metal history. Vocalist Rob Halford's performance is considered one of his best while the guitar work is also highlighted. Bob Gendron praised the song's "landslide riffs" in the Chicago Tribune. The song is regarded as one of the band's classics, and Martin Popoff listed it at No. 17 in his "Top 500 Heavy Metal Songs of All Time".

The song is a combination of two songs by two Judas Priest singers: "Whiskey Woman", by Priest founder Al Atkins and guitarist K. K. Downing, and "Red Light Lady" by later singer Rob Halford. Live versions of the song appear on several of the band's live albums, such as Unleashed in the East (1979), '98 Live Meltdown (1998) and Live in London (2003).

== Background ==
Judas Priest formed in 1969 in Birmingham. Co-founder and lead-vocalist Al Atkins and contributed to much of the band's early material. One of these songs was "Whiskey Woman", co-written with guitarist K. K. Downing, which later became part of "Victim of Changes" along with "Red Light Lady" written by Atkins' replacement Rob Halford, which he brought from his previous band, Hiroshima. Judas Priest often opened with "Red Light Lady" after Halford joined. The band recorded demos of "Victim of Changes", as well as "The Ripper", "Genocide", and "Tyrant" while making their first album, Rocka Rolla (1974), but did not release these songs until their second album, Sad Wings of Destiny (1976).

== Reception and legacy ==
"Victim of Changes" became a frequently-performed favorite amongst Judas Priest fans. When Halford left the group in the 1990s, his replacement Tim "Ripper" Owens auditioned with "Victim of Changes" and "The Ripper". Other artists have recorded the song. Van Halen played the song in the group's early club days. Al Atkins, former singer for Judas Priest and co-writer of the song, recorded the song for his 1998 album of the same name.
