= Al Atkins =

- Born: 14 October 1947 (age 78); West Bromwich, West Midlands, England
- Genres: Heavy metal, blues rock, hard rock
- Occupation: Vocalist
- Years active: 1964–present
- Formerly of: Judas Priest

Alan John Atkins (born 14 October 1947) is an English heavy metal vocalist, best known for being the original lead vocalist and founder of Judas Priest.

== Biography ==
Atkins formed what would become Judas Priest in 1969. With a wife and young daughter to support, Atkins was forced to drop out of Judas Priest "to get a 9-to-5 job" in May 1973. Atkins' position as lead vocalist was succeeded by Rob Halford. With Atkins out of the group, no founding members of the band remained (original members Brian "Bruno" Stapenhill, and John Partridge had left the band in 1970, and John Perry committed suicide in 1969). Atkins received writing credits on the first two Judas Priest albums Rocka Rolla and Sad Wings of Destiny.

As of 2012, Atkins fronts the band Atkins/May Project, which also features guitarist Paul May. A press release dated 21 May 2011 stated that Atkins would be contributing session vocals for the heavy metal opera project, Lyraka. In 2013, Atkins recorded a solo album of his favorite songs written between his days in Judas Priest and his Holy Rage days.

== Discography ==
=== Judas Priest ===
- Rocka Rolla (1974) (credited for writing "Winter", "Never Satisfied", and "Caviar and Meths")
- Sad Wings of Destiny (1976) (credited for writing "Victim of Changes" and "Dreamer Deceiver")

=== Solo ===
- Judgement Day (1990)
- Dreams of Avalon (1991)
- Heavy Thoughts (1994) (released in 2003 with two bonus tracks)
- Victim of Changes (1998)
- Demon Deceiver (2007)
- Demon Deceiver... Plus (re-release with two bonus tracks, 2009)
- Reloaded (re-recorded "best of", featuring Ian Hill, Ralf Scheepers, Roy Z and more special guests, 2017)

=== Holy Rage ===
- Holy Rage (2010)

=== Atkins / May Project ===
- Serpents Kiss (2011)
- Valley of Shadows (2012)
- Empire of Destruction (2014)
- Anthology (compilation, 2015)
- The Final Cut (2020)

=== Albums (guest sessions) ===
Lyraka

- Lyraka Volume 2 (not yet released)
