= Run of the Mill (Judas Priest song) =

1974 song by Judas Priest

Song by Judas Priest

from the album Rocka Rolla
- Released: 6 September 1974
- Recorded: June – July 1974
- Studio: Island, Trident, Olympic; London
- Genre: Progressive rock; blues rock
- Length: 8:34
- Label: Gull
- Songwriters: Rob Halford; K. K. Downing; Glenn Tipton
- Producer: Rodger Bain

"Run of the Mill" is a song by English heavy metal band Judas Priest from their debut album Rocka Rolla. A ballad, it was written by guitarist K. K. Downing, soon after vocalist Rob Halford joined the band. Downing wrote it, in part, to display Halford's unique vocal range.

== Background ==
The track was first recorded as a demo circa 1973, along with another early Priest song, "Whiskey Woman". This track would later surface in altered form on Priest's second album as "Victim of Changes". Priest's manager at the time, Dave Corke, brought the demo to Gull Records, who would later sign Priest after their president, David Howells, attended a performance of the band, with Budgie at London's Marquee Club on 11 February 1974. The song was later recorded properly for their debut, Rocka Rolla, in the summer of 1974.

"Run of the Mill" was Priest's longest recorded track until "Cathedral Spires", a track from their 1997 album, Jugulator. It was also the longest track co-written by Rob Halford, Glenn Tipton, and K. K. Downing prior to "Lochness", a track from their 2005 album, Angel of Retribution.

== Composition and lyrics ==
"Run of the Mill" has been described as a progressive rock and blues rock ballad.

The song's lyrics are about a poor old man, whose "prospects" for a good life "vanished", now embattled and confused by today's society. Following the first two verses is a long guitar solo by Downing, with Glenn Tipton playing keyboards. At the end of the song, the music gets heavier as Halford shows off his vocal range by wailing the end lines.

== Reception ==
Although Priest has not performed the song since the mid-1970s, many fans and critics consider it to be one of the highlights of the album and a classic early Priest track.

== Personnel ==
- Rob Halford – vocals
- K. K. Downing – guitar
- Glenn Tipton – guitar, synthesiser
- Ian Hill – bass guitar
- John Hinch – drums
