= Seventh Wave (band) =

English psychedelic/progressive rock duo

Seventh Wave were an English psychedelic and progressive rock duo formed in the mid-1970s. The band was formed by Ken Elliott (keyboards, vocals) and Kieran O'Connor (percussion), both of whom had been members of earlier progressive rock groups Second Hand and Chillum.

Produced by future Motörhead producer Neil Richmond and signed to the UK based label Gull, and distributed by Motown in the US alongside other UK bands of the day such as If and Judas Priest, Seventh Wave released their first album, Things to Come, in 1974.

Joined by other musicians, including Pete Lemer, Hugh Banton (organist of Van der Graaf Generator), Steve Cook, Brian Gould, Tony Elliott, Pepi Lemer, and Rob Elliott, for their second album, Psi-Fi (1975), the band enjoyed a brief success but broke up after the US tour promoting the album. Kieran O'Connor continued to perform in blues-rock bands, but died in 1991. Ken Elliott went on to write the theme tunes to ITV's lunchtime news bulletin First Report and BBC2's Out of Court.

== Discography ==
Things to Come (Album)

- Released: May 1974
- Format: LP
- Label: Gull (UK), Janus (USA)
- Writer: Ken Elliott, Kieran O'Connor
- Tracks: Sky Scraper, Metropolis, Intercity Water Rat, Escalator, Old Dog Song, Smog, Fog and Sunset, Fail To See, Premonition, Festival, Eversolightly, Communication Skyways, Things to Come, 1999 1/2, Dance of The Eloi

Psi-Fi (Album)

- Released: 1975
- Format: LP
- Label: Gull (UK), Janus (USA)
- Writer: Ken Elliott, Kieran O'Connor
- Tracks: Return to Foreverland, Roads to Rome, Manifestations, Loved by You, Only the Beginning, Aether Anthem, Astral Animal, El Tooto, Camera Obscura, Star Palace of the Sombre Warrior
