= Rocka Rolla =

1974 studio album by Judas Priest

Studio album by Judas Priest
- Released: 6 September 1974
- Recorded: June–July 1974
- Studios: Island, Trident and Olympic, London
- Genres: Hard rock; blues rock
- Length: 38:49
- Label: Gull
- Producer: Rodger Bain

Judas Priest chronology
Rocka Rolla (1974)	Sad Wings of Destiny (1976)

Reissue cover

Singles from Rocka Rolla
- 1. "Rocka Rolla" Released: 23 August 1974

Rocka Rolla is the debut studio album by English heavy metal band Judas Priest, released on 6 September 1974 by Gull Records. It was produced by Rodger Bain, who had made a name for himself as the producer of Black Sabbath's first three albums and Budgie's first two albums. It is the only album to feature drummer John Hinch.

== Background and recording ==
According to the band, the entire album was played live in the studio. There were technical problems, resulting in poor sound quality and a hiss through the album. Guitarist Glenn Tipton had just joined when recording of Rocka Rolla began; his only songwriting contributions accepted by producer Rodger Bain were on the title track and "Run of the Mill". He did come up with the songs "Tyrant", "Epitaph", and "Ripper", but Bain considered them not commercial enough and rejected them. Bain also rejected the concert staple "Whiskey Woman" which later, with contributions from Tipton, morphed into "Victim of Changes". These songs were eventually all included on their next album, Sad Wings of Destiny. In addition, "Winter", "Deep Freeze", "Winter Retreat" and "Cheater" form a suite, but are listed as separate tracks and divided as such on some versions of the CD release.

Several of the songs on the album feature contributions from the band's previous frontman Al Atkins and had been regular parts of their live performances in Manchester, where the band had achieved a cult following during the previous few years. The track "Caviar and Meths" was originally a 14-minute effort penned by Atkins, Downing, and Hill but due to time constraints, only the intro was recorded for the album. A longer 7-minute version of the song appears on Atkins's 1998 album Victim of Changes. That album also contains covers of "Winter" and "Never Satisfied".

== Artistry ==
At this time, the band had not yet developed their signature look of leather and studs. They had appeared on British television show The Old Grey Whistle Test in 1975, performing "Rocka Rolla" and "Dreamer Deceiver", and their wardrobe was very "hippified" as journalist Malcolm Dome put it. This footage was included on the Electric Eye DVD.

In addition, the album is more hard rock and blues rock-oriented than their later releases, and also has some slight progressive rock influences. These continued to a lesser extent up until Stained Class, and would be abandoned in later releases. This makes the album's style virtually unrecognizable when compared with later Priest albums, although "Rocka Rolla" does feature dual guitars, and "Run of the Mill" is the first song that was explicitly designed for Halford's, rather than Atkins', vocal range.

== Release ==
The tour for Rocka Rolla was Judas Priest's first international tour with dates in Germany, Holland, Norway and Denmark including one show at Hotel Klubben in Tønsberg, one hour from Oslo, Norway which scored them a somewhat negative review in the local press. Drummer John Hinch was dismissed in 1975 before the next record was recorded. Tipton would later refer to him as being "musically inadequate" for the band's future plans.

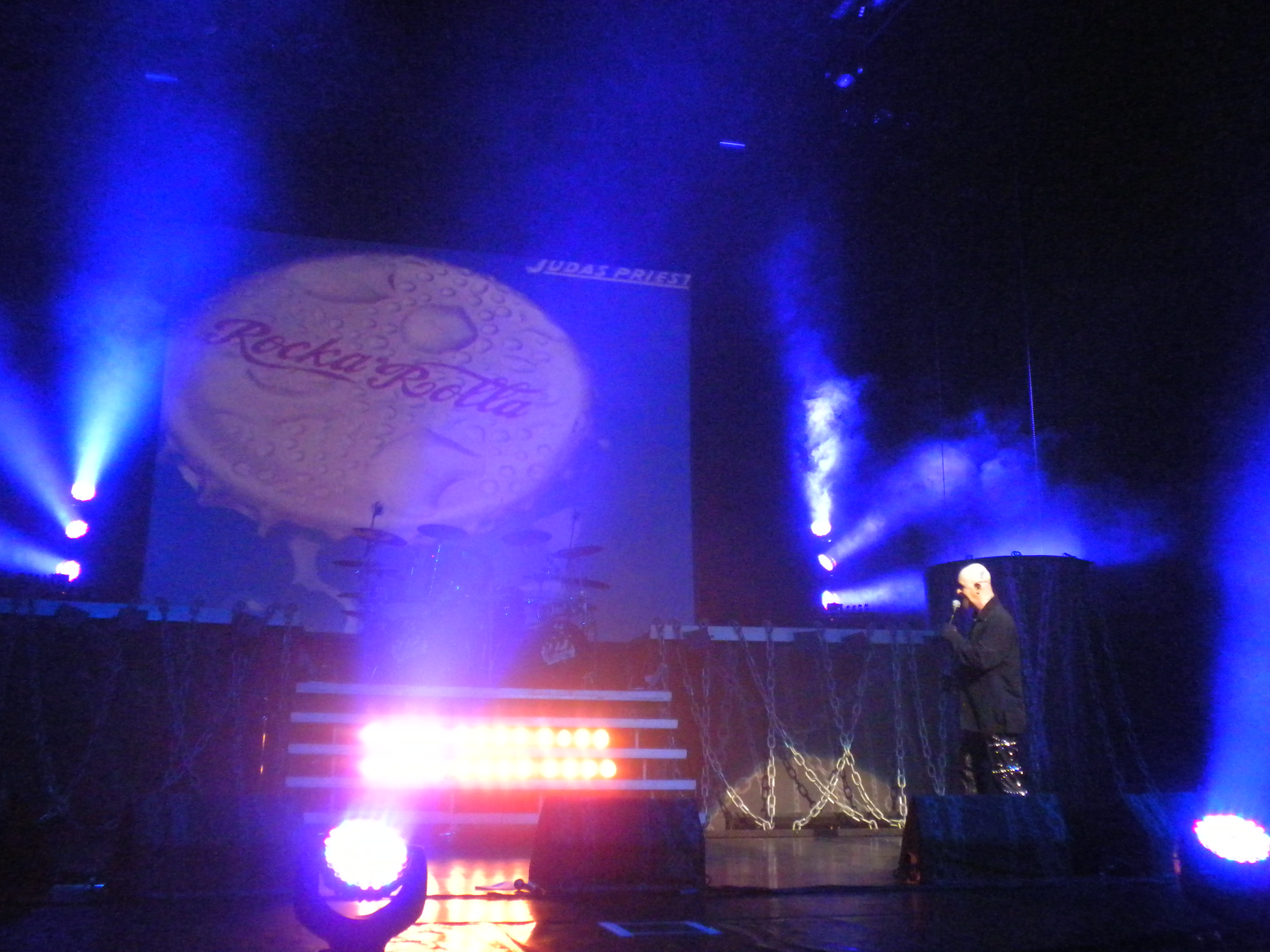
Rob Halford made a brief explanation before performing "Never Satisfied" during the Epitaph Tour, as there were "a few blank stares" from the audience while performing the song.

The album was reissued several times over the years, and in 1984 it was issued with a different sleeve design. The original "bottle cap" album cover art, featuring the title in Spencerian script, was initially intended by designer John Pasche for use with an unspecified Rolling Stones album. The band had filed a lawsuit with the Coca-Cola company. The re-issue cover art (by artist Melvyn Grant, and originally used as the cover for the novel The Steel Tsar) was also used for the US cover of Ballistix for the TurboGrafx-16 and Amiga.

Most of the songs from Rocka Rolla have not been performed by Judas Priest live since the mid-late 1970s, although Halford's solo band performed "Never Satisfied" during live shows in 2003, and the same song was part of the setlist of the Epitaph World Tour. "Rocka Rolla" was performed for the first time since 1976 at Bloodstock Open Air in 2021.

== Reception ==
Professional ratings
Review scores
Source	Rating
AllMusic	2.5/5 stars
Encyclopedia of Popular Music	2/5 stars

The album was released to very little reception selling "only a few thousand copies". Because it flopped, the band found themselves in dire financial straits. In particular, they talked of nights in which they were starving and didn't know when they were going to get their next meal. They tried to enter into an agreement with Gull Records to pay them £50 a week, but Gull, which was also suffering economic woes, refused. In a retrospective review, AllMusic gave Rocka Rolla a rating of 2.5 out of five stars, and said that while it was a "sketchy and underfocused debut", the album "definitely hints at Judas Priest's potential and originality".

== Track listing ==
Side one
No.	Title	Writer(s)	Length
1.	"One for the Road"	Rob Halford, K. K. Downing	4:34
2.	"Rocka Rolla"	Halford, Downing, Glenn Tipton	3:05
3.	"Winter"	Al Atkins, Downing, Ian Hill	3:02
4.	"Deep Freeze"	Downing	1:58
5.	"Winter Retreat"	Halford, Downing	1:30
6.	"Cheater"	Halford, Downing	2:59

Side two
No.	Title	Writer(s)	Length
7.	"Never Satisfied"	Atkins, Downing	4:50
8.	"Run of the Mill"	Halford, Downing, Tipton	8:34
9.	"Dying to Meet You"	Halford, Downing	6:23
10.	"Caviar and Meths" (Instrumental)	Atkins, Downing, Hill	2:02

1987 remaster bonus track
No.	Title	Writer(s)	Length
11.	"Diamonds and Rust" (Joan Baez cover, 1975 recording)	Joan Baez	3:12

=== Track notes ===
The very rare first printing of the UK LP has the words "Thanks for the words Al!" printed last in the credits in the blue circle on the back cover. This, presumably a reference to original singer Al Atkins, has been removed on other versions of the Gull vinyl.

On some versions of the CD release, "Rocka Rolla" is timed at 4:00 and "Winter" at 0:45, becoming a medley but remaining on separate tracks. Some releases, e.g. Hero, Hero also combine "Winter", "Deep Freeze" and "Winter Retreat" into one track. The iTunes version combines those three plus "Cheater" into one track.

The version of "Diamonds & Rust" that appears on the re-release is actually from the Sad Wings of Destiny sessions and not the version that appears on Sin After Sin.

Rocka Rolla features Judas Priest's longest track, "Run of the Mill" (8:34), prior to "Cathedral Spires" (9:17) from Jugulator in 1997. It is also the longest track co-written by Halford, Downing and Tipton prior to "Lochness" (13:28) from Angel of Retribution in 2005.

Rocka Rolla was covered by Swedish black metal band Vondur in the EP The Galactic Rock n' Roll Empire

== Personnel ==
Judas Priest

- Rob Halford – lead vocals, harmonica (credited as "Bob Halford" on some releases)
- Glenn Tipton – guitars, synthesisers, backing vocals
- K. K. Downing – guitars
- Ian Hill – bass guitar
- John Hinch – drums
- Alan Moore – drums (track 11 only)

Production

- Produced by Rodger Bain
- Engineered by Vic Smith
- Cover concept by John Pasche; photo by Bryce Atwell
- Band photographs by Alan Johnson

== Release ==
The album, along with Sad Wings of Destiny, owned by Gull at that time, was reissued as part of the band's limited edition 50 Heavy Metal Years of Music box-set, released on October 2021, through Sony Music Entertainment and Legacy Recordings.

In 2023, the band regained control of the recordings of Rocka Rolla and also their second album via the company Reach Music and are planning a 50th anniversary release of the album for 2024.

Hill confirmed in a 2024 interview with Detroit radio station WRIF that the album had been "re-engineered" by Priest collaborator Tom Allom in preparation for a release that was "a few weeks away."

The album, titled "Rocka Rolla - 50th Anniversary: Remixed And Remastered 1974 - 2024", was digitally re-released on 13 September 2024 and was expected to be physically reissued on 22 November 2024. This version also replaces the fadeouts from the original release with the natural endings of the tracks, but does not include the original four-minute version of "Rocka Rolla".
