= Run of the Mill =

Run of the Mill may refer to:

- "Run of the Mill" (George Harrison song), 1970 song by George Harrison
- "Run of the Mill" (Judas Priest song), 1974 song by Judas Priest

== See also ==
- Wikipedia:Run-of-the-mill
