= Chillum (disambiguation) =

Chillum may refer to:

- Chillum (pipe)
- Chillum, Maryland
- Chillum, an album by the band Second Hand
- West Hyattsville (WMATA station), originally planned to be named Chillum
