= Reality (Second Hand album) =

Studio album by Second Hand
- Released: 1968
- Recorded: Maximum Sound Studios, Advision Studios, 1967–1968
- Genre: Progressive rock, symphonic rock, psychedelic rock
- Length: 43:11
- Label: Polydor
- Producer: Vic Keary

Second Hand chronology
Reality (1968)	Death May Be Your Santa Claus (1971)

Reality is the debut studio album by British rock band Second Hand, released in 1968. The album is sometimes considered to be one of the first progressive rock recordings, and sometimes as a psychedelic rock/garage rock album which includes only occasional elements of progressive. Most of the album's material was written and recorded in early 1967.

== Background ==
Lyrics of several of the songs, such as ″Denis James The Clown″, ″Ode to D.J.″ and ″The Bath Song″ mention Denis James The Clown and his death. Ken Elliott stated, "I tied up the loose album concept in the persona of Denis James, and at the same time it amused me to think of a disc jockey playing a song about the romantic failure and suicide of someone whose initials were ′DJ′."

== Reception ==
Professional ratings
Review scores
Source	Rating
Allmusic	4/5 stars

In a retrospective review for Allmusic, Rolf Semprebon commented, "There are lots of long instrumental sections with guitar solos, which is fortunate because Ken Elliott's vocals are the weakest link, and a few of his song arrangements come off a little dated as well. Fortunately, those aspects are not enough to distract too much from this otherwise excellent record."

== Track listing ==
Side one

1. "A Fairy Tale" (Ken Elliott) - 3:18
2. "Rhubarb!" (Elliott, Bob Gibbons) - 3:42
3. "Denis James the Clown" (Arthur Kitchener) - 2:21
4. "Steam Tugs" (Elliott) - 3:16
5. "Good Old '59 (We Are Slowly Gettin' Older)" (Elliott) - 2:19
6. "The World Will End Yesterday" (Elliott, Gibbons) - 3:51

Side two

7. "Denis James the Clown (Ode to D.J.)" (Elliott, Kitchener) - 3:12
8. "Mainliner" (Elliott) - 7:13
9. "Reality" (Elliott, Gibbons) - 7:42
10. "The Bath Song" (Elliott) - 3:12

=== Bonus tracks on 2007 re-issue ===
11. "A Fairy Tale" (demo recording)
12. "Steam Tugs" (demo recording)
13. "James in the Basement" (with Denis Couldry) (Couldry)
14. "I Am Nearly There" (with Denis Couldry) (Couldry)

== Personnel ==
Second Hand

- Ken Elliott - organ, pianos, harpsichord, mellotron, lead vocals
- Bob Gibbons - guitars
- Kieran O'Connor - drums, percussion
- Arthur Kitchener - bass guitar (on tracks 2, 6, 8, 10)
- Nick South - bass guitar (on tracks 1, 3, 5, 6, 9)

Additional personnel

- Chris Williams - cello, flute, saxophone
- anonymous vocal group - backing vocals
- Vic Keary - producer, engineer (assisted by Mike Craig)
