= Judas Priest =

English heavy metal band

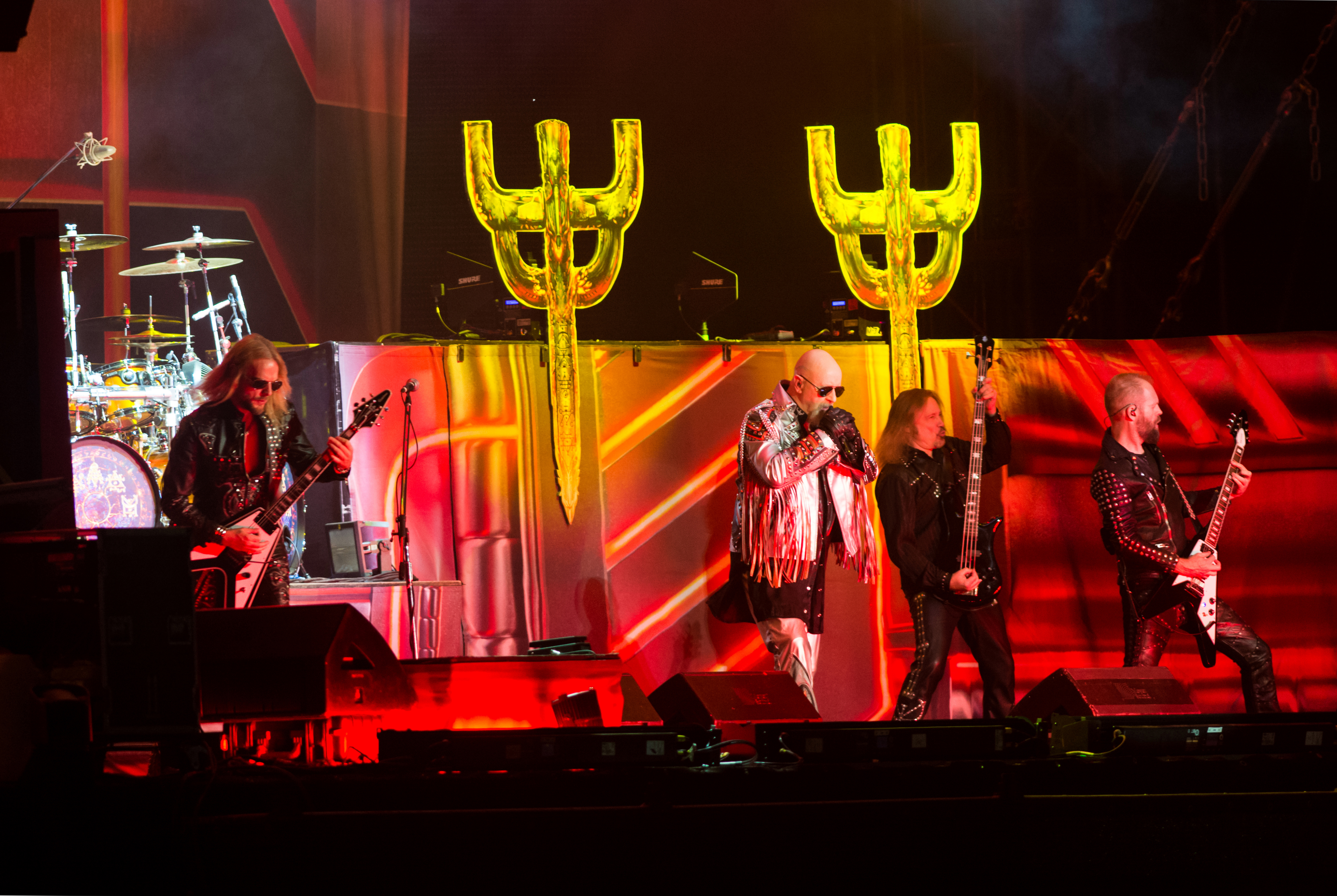
- Judas Priest at Wacken Open Air 2018

Background information
- Origin: Birmingham, England
- Genre: Heavy metal
- Works: Discography
- Years active: 1969–1970; 1970–1992; 1996–present
- Labels: Sony; Epic; Columbia/CBS; SPV; CMC; Atlantic; Gull
- Spinoffs: Fight; KK's Priest; Halford; 2wo
- Members: Rob Halford; Glenn Tipton; Scott Travis; Richie Faulkner; Dave Rimmer
- Past members: Full list
- Website: judaspriest.com
- Logo
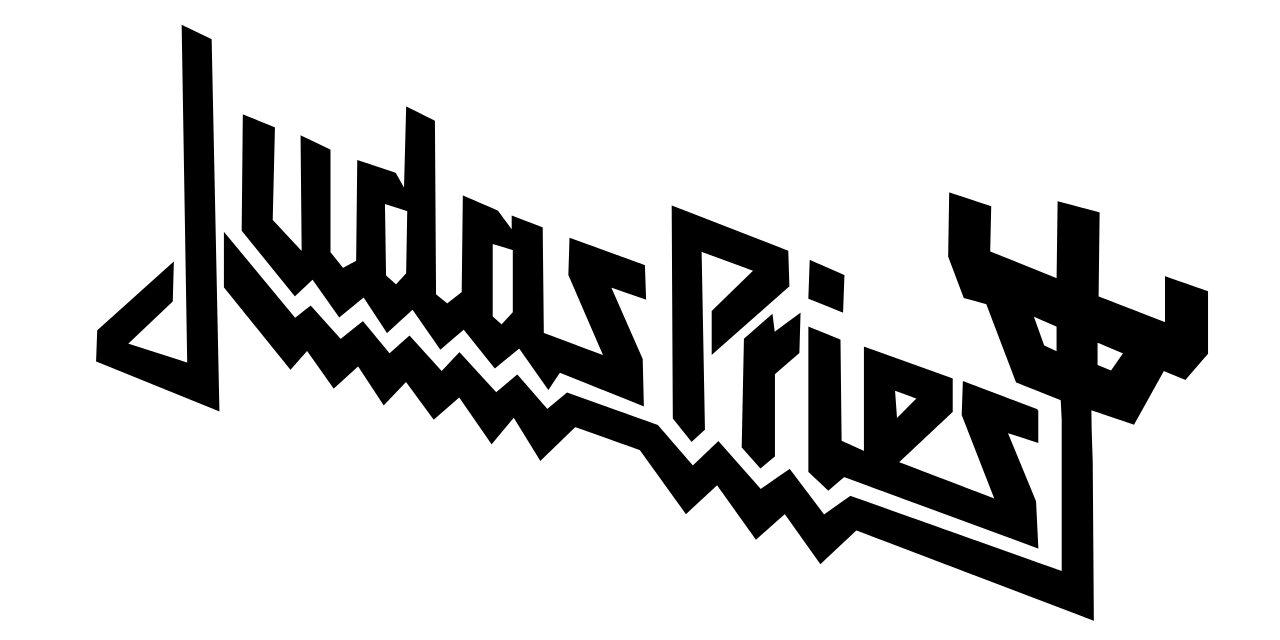

Judas Priest are an English heavy metal band formed in Birmingham in 1969. They have sold over 50 million albums and are frequently ranked as one of the greatest metal bands of all time. They have been referred to as one of the pioneers of the new wave of British heavy metal (NWOBHM) movement, and cited as a formative influence on metal subgenres, including speed metal, thrash metal, and power metal, as well as the hard rock and glam metal scenes of the 1980s. The band struggled without significant commercial success until 1980, when their sixth studio album British Steel brought mainstream attention.

The original line-up of Judas Priest included vocalist Al Atkins, bassist Bruno Stapenhill, drummer John Partridge and guitarist John Perry. The band cycled through numerous members over the next few years, including bassist Ian Hill and guitarist K. K. Downing who both joined in 1970. After Rob Halford replaced Atkins in 1973, Judas Priest were left with no original members, and Glenn Tipton joined as their second guitarist the following year. The core of Hill, Downing, Halford and Tipton saw a revolving cast of drummers (with only Les Binks playing on more than one album), before Dave Holland joined in 1979. Since Holland's departure in 1989, Scott Travis has been the band's drummer. Halford left in 1992, and after a four-year hiatus, Judas Priest regrouped in 1996 with Tim "Ripper" Owens (formerly of Winter's Bane) replacing him. After two albums with Owens, Halford returned to the band in 2003. Downing left Judas Priest in 2011 and was replaced by Richie Faulkner, while Hill retired in 2026 and was replaced by Uriah Heep bassist Dave Rimmer. The current line-up consists of Tipton, Travis, Halford, Faulkner and Rimmer; although Tipton remains as an official member of the band, he has limited his touring activities since 2018 due to Parkinson's disease, with Andy Sneap filling in for him.

The Guardian referred to British Steel as the record that defines heavy metal. Despite a decline in exposure during the mid-1990s, the band have seen a resurgence, including worldwide tours, being inaugural inductees into the VH1 Rock Honors in 2006, receiving a Grammy Award for Best Metal Performance in 2010, and having their songs featured in video games including Guitar Hero and the Rock Band series. In 2022, the band were inducted into the Rock and Roll Hall of Fame via the Award for Musical Excellence.

== History ==
=== Origins (1969–1974) ===
Judas Priest were formed in 1969 in Birmingham, England, by lead vocalist Al Atkins and bassist Brian "Bruno" Stapenhill, with John Perry on guitars and John "Fezza" Partridge on drums. Perry took his own life at age 18, and amongst the replacements the band auditioned was future Judas Priest guitarist Kenneth "K.K." Downing; at the time, they turned him down in favour of 17-year-old multi-instrumentalist Ernest Chataway, who had played with Birmingham band Black Sabbath when they were still called Earth. Stapenhill came up with the name Judas Priest from Bob Dylan's song "The Ballad of Frankie Lee and Judas Priest" on the album John Wesley Harding. Partridge was replaced in 1970 by drummer Fred Woolley, who later re-joined Chataway and Stapenhill in the band Bullion. No member of that early line-up lasted long enough to play on the band's recordings, though several songs co-written by Atkins appeared on their first two albums.

The band recorded a two-song demo "Good Time Woman" and "We'll Stay Together" and eventually gained a three-album recording contract with the label Immediate in late 1969 after a gig in Walsall, (Note: The gig was on 25 November 1969, and Led Zeppelin vocalist Robert Plant was in the audience.) but the label went out of business before an album could be recorded, and the band split in 1970. Late in the year, Atkins found a heavy rock band called Freight rehearsing without a singer, made up of K. K. Downing on guitars, his childhood friend Ian "Skull" Hill on bass, and drummer John Ellis. He joined them, and they took on Atkins' defunct band's name. Their first gig was on 6 March 1971. Ellis quit later that year and was replaced by Alan Moore. Early shows included Jimi Hendrix, Pink Floyd and Quatermass covers, and in 1972, the set list included the originals "Never Satisfied", "Winter", and the show-closer "Caviar and Meths". July 1971 also saw them making a 45 rpm demo of "Mind Conception" with "Holy is the Man" on the B-side for the Zella Records label.

Moore left and was replaced with Chris "Congo" Campbell, and the band joined the management agency of Black Sabbath guitarist Tony Iommi, Iommi Management Agency. (Note: The Iommi Management Agency changed its name to Tramp Entertainments in 1973.) Atkins continued to write material for the band—including "Whiskey Woman", which became the base for the Judas Priest staple "Victim of Changes"—but as finances were tight and he had a family to support, he played his last gigs with the band in December 1972 and left the band in May 1973. Campbell left soon afterwards, later to surface in the band Machine, and the band enlisted two members of the band Hiroshima: drummer John Hinch and vocalist Rob Halford, the brother of Hill's girlfriend. (Note: Hill and Sue Halford were married from 1976 to 1984 and have a son together.) Halford and Hinch played their first show with the band in May 1973 at the Townhouse in Wellington. The show was recorded, and part of it was released in 2019 on the compilation Downer-Rock Asylum on the Audio Archives label along with one live song from the Atkins era.

Judas Priest made their first tour of continental Europe in early 1974, and they returned to England that April to sign a recording deal with the label Gull. Gull suggested adding a fifth member to fill in the band's sound; they took on as a second lead guitarist Glenn Tipton, whose group the Flying Hat Band were also managed by Iommi's agency.

=== Rocka Rolla (1974–1975) ===
Judas Priest went into the studio in June–July 1974 with Black Sabbath producer Rodger Bain. The band released their debut single "Rocka Rolla" and followed it with the album of the same name in September. The album features a variety of styles—straight-up rock, heavy riffing, and progressive.

Technical problems during the recording contributed to the poor sound quality of the record. Producer Rodger Bain, whose resume included Black Sabbath's first three albums and Budgie's first album, dominated the production of the album and made decisions with which the band did not agree. Bain also chose to leave fan favourites from the band's live set, such as "Tyrant", "Genocide" and "The Ripper", from the album and he cut the song "Caviar and Meths" from a 10-minute song down to a 2-minute instrumental.

The tour for Rocka Rolla was the band's first international tour with dates in Germany, the Netherlands, Norway and Denmark including one show at Hotel Klubben in Tønsberg, one hour from Oslo, Norway, which scored them a somewhat negative review in the local press. The album flopped upon release, leaving Priest in dire financial straits. Priest attempted to secure a deal with Gull Records to get a monthly pay of £50, however, because Gull Records were struggling as well, they declined.

=== Sad Wings of Destiny (1975–1977) ===
Judas Priest performed "Rocka Rolla" on BBC Two's The Old Grey Whistle Test in 1975, as well as the "Dreamer Deceiver"–"Deceiver" pair the year before the songs appeared on Sad Wings of Destiny. Hinch left the band for reasons that are disputed and was replaced with Alan Moore, who returned to the band in October 1975. Finances were tight: band members restricted themselves to one meal a day—and several took on part-time work—while they recorded their follow-up album on a budget of £2,000. The group intended to make an album mixing straight-ahead rock with a progressive edge.

The band recorded Sad Wings of Destiny over two weeks in November and December 1975 at Rockfield Studios in Wales. The band stayed sober during the 12-hour recording sessions. The cover depicts a struggling, grounded angel surrounded by flames and wearing a devil's three-pronged cross, which became the band's symbol. The album was released in March 1976, with "The Ripper" as its lead single. The band supported the album with a headlining tour of the UK from April to June 1976. By this time Halford joked that fans should burn their copies of Rocka Rolla.

The album had little commercial success at first and had difficulty getting noticed due to critical competition from the rise of punk rock, though it had a positive review in Rolling Stone. Fans, critics, and the band have since come to see Sad Wings of Destiny as the album on which Judas Priest consolidated their sound and image. It features heavy riffing and complex song arrangements that Tipton and Downing have said were inspired by the factories of the Black Country. The album's centrepiece "Victim of Changes" evolved from a combination of Atkins' "Whiskey Woman" and Halford's "Red Light Woman", and went on to become a fan favourite.

The band grew dissatisfied with Gull; the tight finances led Moore to leave the band a second time—this time permanently. Sad Wings of Destiny caught the attention of CBS Records, and with the help of new manager David Hemmings, the band signed with CBS and received a £60,000 budget for their next album. The signing required breaking their contract with Gull, resulting in the rights to the first two albums and all related recordings—including demos—becoming property of Gull. Gull periodically repackaged and re-released the material from these albums.

=== Sin After Sin, Stained Class and Killing Machine (1977–1979) ===
Judas Priest recorded their major-label debut, Sin After Sin, in January 1977 at the Who's Ramport Studios, with Deep Purple bassist Roger Glover as producer. Moore left again during the album's sessions and was replaced by session drummer Simon Phillips. The album features significant developments in heavy metal technique, in particular its use of double-kick drumming on tracks such as "Dissident Aggressor", and includes a pop-metal cover of "Diamonds & Rust" by folk singer Joan Baez.

Sin After Sin appeared in April 1977. It was the first Priest record under a major label, CBS, and the first of eleven consecutive albums to be certified Gold or Platinum by the Recording Industry Association of America (RIAA). Phillips declined to become a permanent member of Judas Priest, so the band hired Les Binks on Glover's recommendation. Together, they recorded Stained Class, produced by Dennis MacKay, and Killing Machine (released in North America as Hell Bent for Leather), both released in 1978. Binks was credited with co-writing "Beyond the Realms of Death".

Binks also played on Unleashed in the East (1979), which was recorded live in Japan during the Killing Machine tour. Killing Machine was the first nod to a more commercial sound, with simpler songs that brought back some blues influences. At about the same time, the band members adopted their now-famous "leather-and-studs" image. "Killing Machine" features one cover version, the Fleetwood Mac song "The Green Manalishi", of which there has always been much debate concerning the conceptual meaning of the title, and the lyrical content. Peter Green, the composer, has said that the lyrics are about money, represented, or symbolised in the narrative by the devil. Green explained that he wrote the track after experiencing a drug-influenced dream in which he received a visitation from a green dog, which bayed at him from the afterlife. He understood that the dog represented money.

Describing the impact of the cover version of "The Green Manalishi", journalist Adrien Begrand states that the group had "succeeded in such a way that the Priest version is now far more famous than the original. They make it their own, accelerating the pace just enough to achieve a better balance of force and menace, and the groove created by drummer Les Binks cinches it. Priest's towering version is nevertheless an all-time heavy metal classic."

=== Mainstream success years (1979–1991) ===
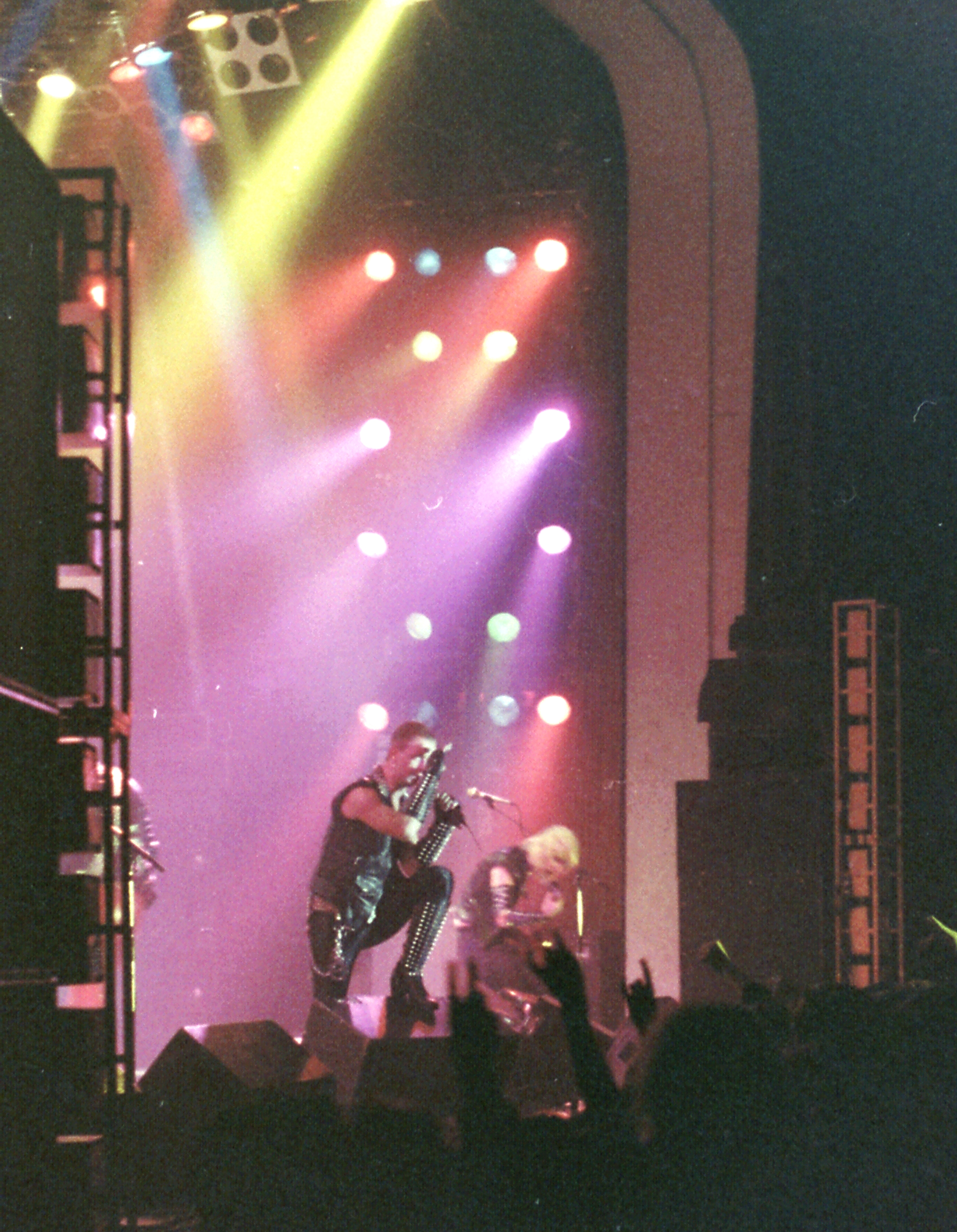
Judas Priest performing in 1981, during their World Wide Blitz Tour

From Killing Machine's supporting tour came the live album Unleashed in the East (1979). It was the first of many Judas Priest albums to go platinum. There was some criticism of the band's use of studio enhancements and overdubbing in what was marketed as a live album. By this point the playing style of the band had grown progressively heavier, with live versions of songs such as "Exciter", "Tyrant" and "Diamonds and Rust" sounding much heavier and faster than their studio counterparts.

Les Binks quit in late 1979, as he was unhappy with the band's manager Mike Dolan's decision not to pay him for his performance on the live album, so they replaced him with Dave Holland, formerly of the band Trapeze. With this line-up, Judas Priest recorded six studio and one live album, which garnered different degrees of critical and financial success.

In 1980, the band released British Steel. The songs were shorter and had more mainstream radio hooks, but retained the familiar heavy metal feel. Tracks such as "United", "Breaking the Law", and "Living After Midnight" were frequently played on the radio. The next release, 1981's Point of Entry, followed the same formula, and the tour in support of the album featured new songs such as "Solar Angels" and "Heading Out to the Highway".

In late 1981, the group wrote a number of songs at Ibiza Sound Studios in Ibiza, Spain, continuing their collaboration with producer Tom Allom. Initially, it was planned for a release in early 1982, but it was decided that they would resume recording after their 1981 World Wide Blitz Tour have been concluded. In January 1982, the group recorded their material, which it showcased their continuing success in straightforward heavy rock tunes. Their resulting record, Screaming for Vengeance, was released on 1 July 1982. Charting in nine countries, it peaked at number 11 in the UK and number 17 in the US. The latter contained their most popular track of their discography, "You've Got Another Thing Comin'", which ultimately gained heavy rotation across multiple radio stations in North America. The song charted at number 67 on the US Billboard Hot 100, the band's only song to chart towards crossover pop airplay and sales. It charted at number four on its Mainstream Rock chart position at that region. "(Take These) Chains" was also released as a single, but did not chart. Multiple tracks from Screaming for Vengeance also included "Electric Eye" and "Riding on the Wind", which received adequate airplay and has been proven to be popular in live performances. The album was certified gold by the Recording Industry Association of America (RIAA) within four months of release, then platinum in 1983, later double platinum by 2001. The group followed up that year with their World Vengeance Tour to support the album. On 29 May 1983, the band appeared as headliners on Heavy Metal Day of the US Festival in San Bernardino, California, sponsored by Steve Wozniak. The band was fourth in the line-up that also included Quiet Riot, Mötley Crüe, Ozzy Osbourne, Triumph, Scorpions, and Van Halen.

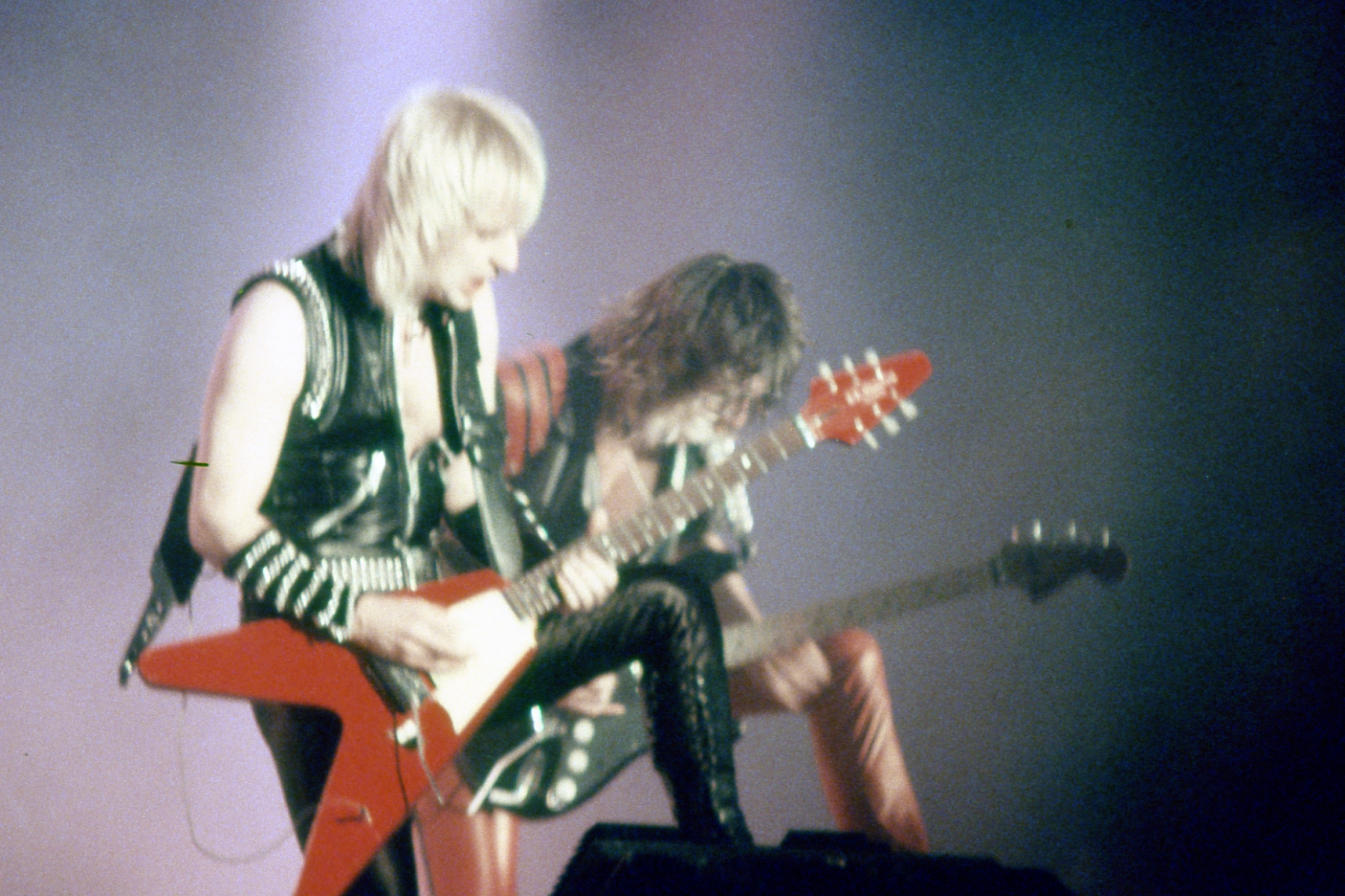
Downing and Tipton performing in San Sebastián, Spain, during their Metal Conqueror Tour of 1984

Priest continued their success through the mid-1980s. "Freewheel Burning", released in 1983, was a regular on rock radio. Its album Defenders of the Faith was released the following year. Some critics dubbed it "Screaming for Vengeance II", due to its musical similarity to the previous album.

On 13 July 1985, Judas Priest, along with Black Sabbath and other performers, played Live Aid at JFK Stadium in Philadelphia. Their setlist included "Living After Midnight", "The Green Manalishi (With the Two-Pronged Crown)" and "(You've Got) Another Thing Comin'".

Turbo was released in April 1986 and it is the last studio album to be certified Platinum by the RIAA. The band adopted a more colourful stage look and gave their music a more mainstream feel by adding guitar synthesisers. The band had a successful arena tour, with 100 concerts in North America, Europe and Japan in 1986. A live album recorded on the tour, titled Priest...Live!, was released the next year, offering live tracks from the era. The video documentary Heavy Metal Parking Lot was created by Jeff Krulik and John Heyn in 1986. It documents the heavy metal fans waiting on 31 May 1986 for Priest's concert (with special guests Dokken) at the Capital Center (later renamed US Airways Arena) in Landover, Maryland.

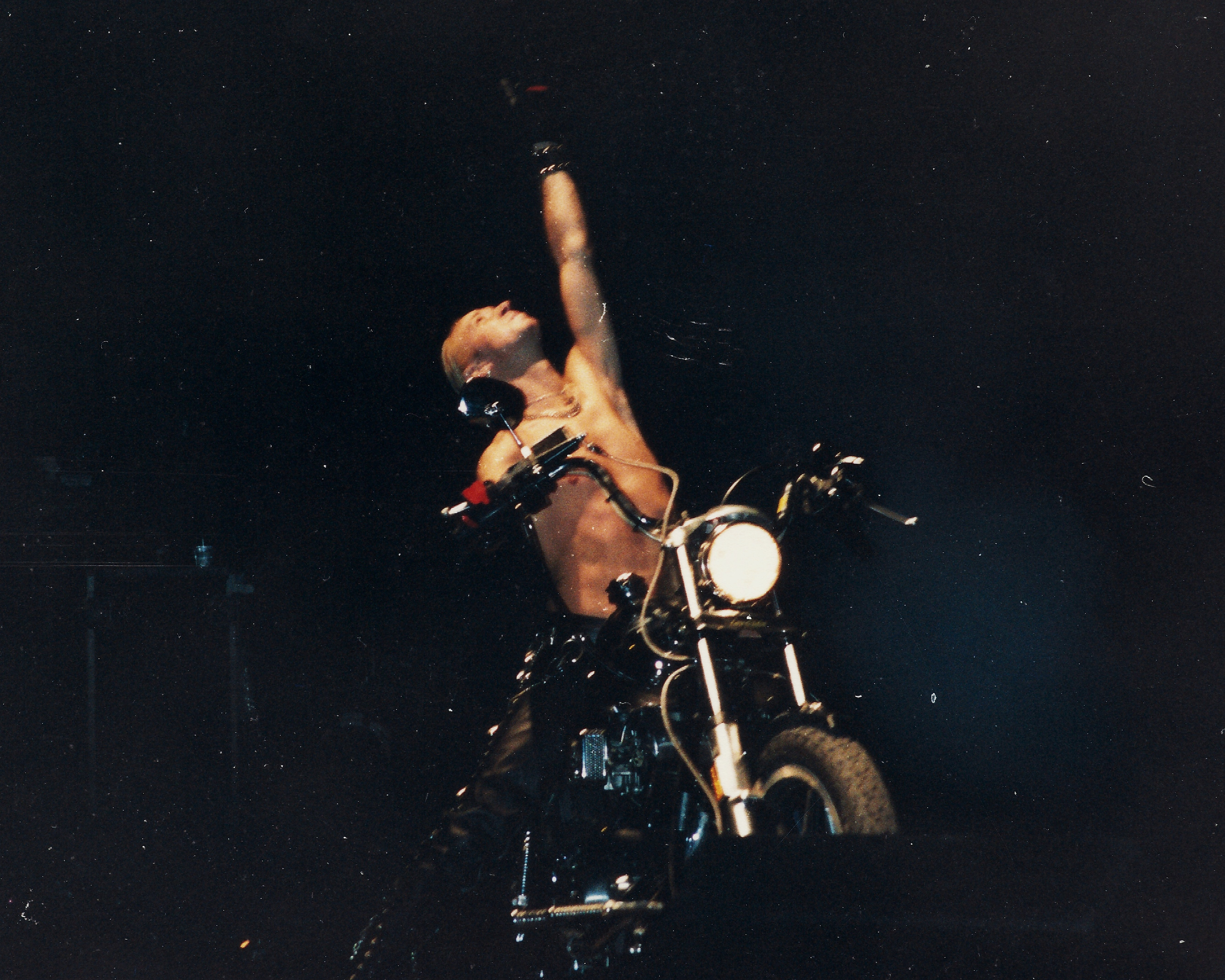
Rob Halford in 1988. One of Priest's trademark stage stunts was to have Halford ride a motorbike on stage.

In May 1988, Ram It Down was released, featuring several reworked songs left over from Turbo, in addition to new songs. The band recorded three tracks with pop producers Stock-Aitken-Waterman: two originals, "Runaround" and "I Will Return", and a cover of the Stylistics' hit "You Are Everything". Producer Matt Aitken said of the sessions, "I think it was ill-conceived, it was unlikely it was going to work. But we went into it with the spirit of optimism, and we did the best with them, within the parameters within which we would be prepared to work. We weren't going to use live drum kits and stuff, and that probably made it a no go from the start. I have no idea why we were working with Judas Priest really, but I think we made a good fist of a heavy metal song. I think it sounded alright." The tracks were ultimately not included on this album due to a management decision.

A reviewer has called Ram It Down a "stylistic evolution" that resulted from the band's "attempt to rid themselves of the tech synthesiser approach ... and return to the traditional metal of their fading glory days". The reviewer argued the album showed "how far behind they were lagging ... the thrashers they helped influence" in earlier years. In 1989, longtime drummer Dave Holland left the band due to personal problems.

In September 1990, the Painkiller album featured new drummer, Scott Travis (formerly from Racer X), who gave the band an edgier sound thanks to his heavy use of double bass. This comeback album also dropped the 1980s-style synthesisers for all songs except "A Touch of Evil". The tour used bands such as Annihilator, Megadeth, Pantera, Sepultura and Testament as opening bands, and culminated in the Rock in Rio performance in Brazil in front of 100,000+ fans.

Part of the Judas Priest stage show often featured Halford riding onstage on a Harley-Davidson motorbike, dressed in motorcycle leathers and sunglasses. During a Toronto show in August 1991, Halford was seriously injured as he rode on stage, when he collided with a drum riser hidden behind clouds of dry ice mist. Though the show was delayed, he performed the set before going to a hospital. Hill later noted "he must have been in agony". In a 2007 interview, Halford said the accident had nothing to do with his departure from the band.

==== Subliminal message trial ====
In 1990, Judas Priest was the subject of civil action in the United States which alleged that the band was responsible for an incident in Sparks, Nevada, in 1985 in which 20-year-old James Vance and 18-year-old Raymond Belknap shot themselves. On the evening of 23 December 1985, Vance and Belknap went to a church playground with a 12-gauge shotgun with the purpose of committing suicide. They had consumed alcohol and marijuana earlier that evening. The lawsuit alleged that the pair had been listening to Judas Priest's 1978 album Stained Class that night. Belknap was the first to place the shotgun under his chin, and died instantly after pulling the trigger. Some time later, Vance also shot himself, but succeeded only in disfiguring himself by blowing away the lower half of his face. Vance died three years later of a suspected drug overdose.

The Belknap and Vance families sued Judas Priest and its members, alleging that the band had embedded subliminal messages such as "try suicide", "do it" and "let's be dead" in the band's cover of the 1969 Spooky Tooth song "Better by You, Better than Me". Judas Priest had recorded the cover at the urging of their record company after the rest of Stained Class had been completed. The plaintiffs alleged that this subliminal command was the trigger which led directly to the pair deciding to shoot themselves. Vance's parents said that their son had been troubled for a long time prior to the suicide pact, but had recently "changed for the better" and had re-embraced his family's Christian faith before the "garbage music" of Judas Priest had again led him astray.

Local fans of heavy metal protested during the trial, calling for Judas Priest to be exonerated. The plaintiffs played the song at various speeds and backward, alleging the use of backmasking. The trial lasted from 16 July to 24 August 1990, when the judge dismissed the lawsuit on the basis that the so-called subliminal message "was a coincidental convergence of a guitar chord with an exhalation pattern". One of the defense witnesses, Dr. Timothy E. Moore, wrote an article for Skeptical Inquirer chronicling the trial. The trial was covered in a 1991 documentary film, Dream Deceivers: The Story Behind James Vance Vs. Judas Priest.

=== Halford's departure and Ripper years (1991–2003) ===
After the Painkiller tour ended in August 1991, there were indications of internal tensions within the band. Halford went on to form a street-style thrash metal group named Fight, with Scott Travis on drums for the recording sessions. He formed this band to explore new musical territory, but due to contractual obligations, he remained with Judas Priest until May 1992. In his 2020 memoir Confess, Halford blamed his departure on a "miscommunication", rather than an intentional desire to quit the band.

Halford collaborated with Judas Priest in the release of a compilation album entitled Metal Works '73–'93 to commemorate their 20th anniversary. He also appeared in a video by the same title, documenting their history, in which his departure from the band was officially announced later that year.

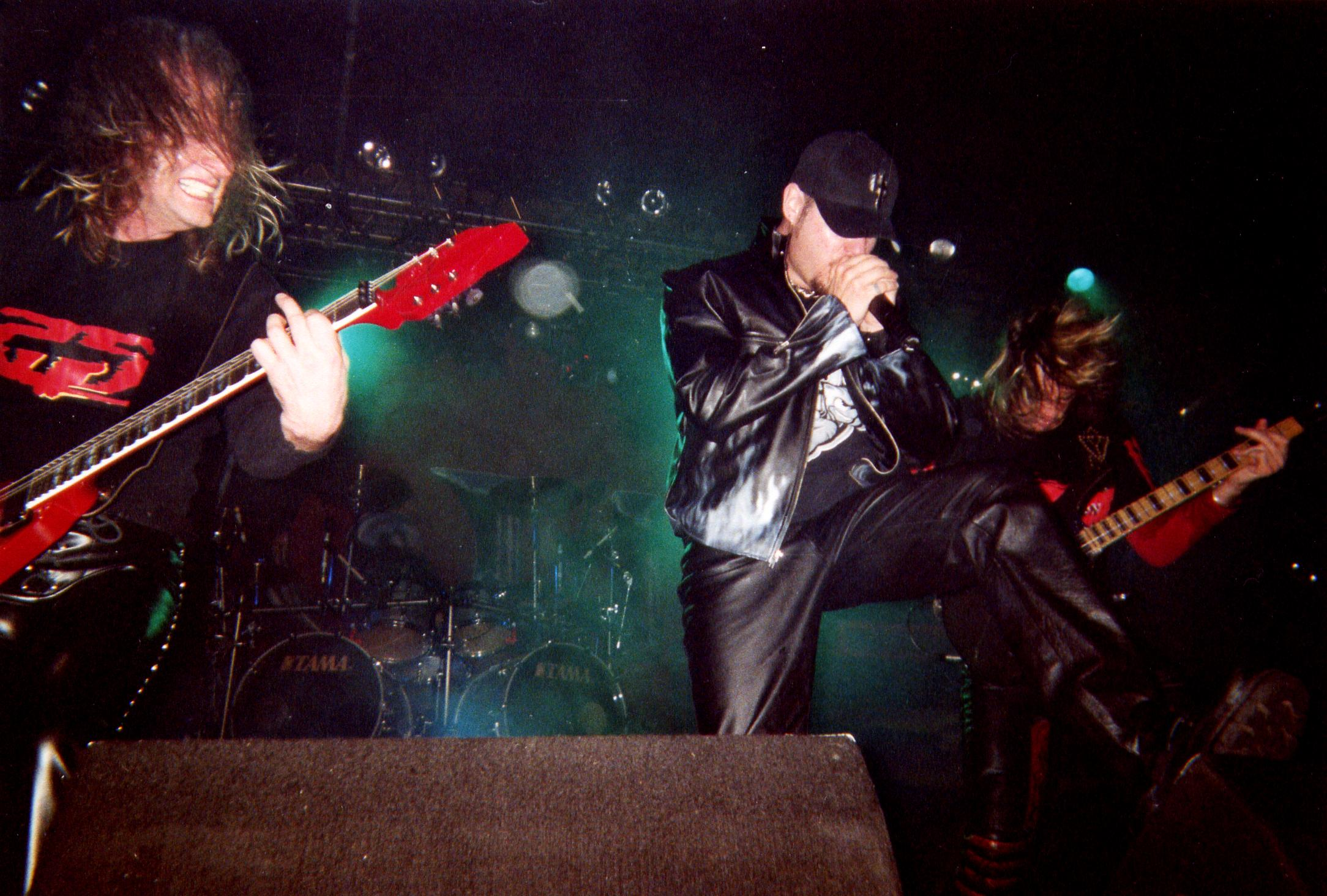
Judas Priest performing in 2002, with Tim Owens (center) fronting the band

Although Judas Priest went on hiatus following Halford's departure, the remaining members of the band spent the next four years searching for a replacement for him. Known singers who auditioned for, or were offered to join, the band during this period include Steve Grimmett (Grim Reaper, Lionsheart and ex-Onslaught), Ralf Scheepers (Primal Fear and ex-Gamma Ray), Whitfield Crane (Ugly Kid Joe), former Accept singer David Reece, and a then-unknown Devin Townsend. Tim "Ripper" Owens (who had previously sung in Winter's Bane and a Judas Priest tribute band called British Steel) was hired in 1996 as Judas Priest's new singer. This line-up released two studio albums, Jugulator in 1997 (in 1999, the song "Bullet Train" was nominated for a Grammy Award for Best Metal Performance) and Demolition in 2001. A considerable stylistic departure from prior releases, the former has been characterised as groove metal and the latter as nu metal, both receiving mixed reviews. The line-up also gave rise to two live double-albums – '98 Live Meltdown (1998) and Live in London (2003), the latter of which had a live DVD counterpart.

In a February 1998 interview on MTV, Halford came out as gay.

=== Reunion and Angel of Retribution (2003–2006) ===
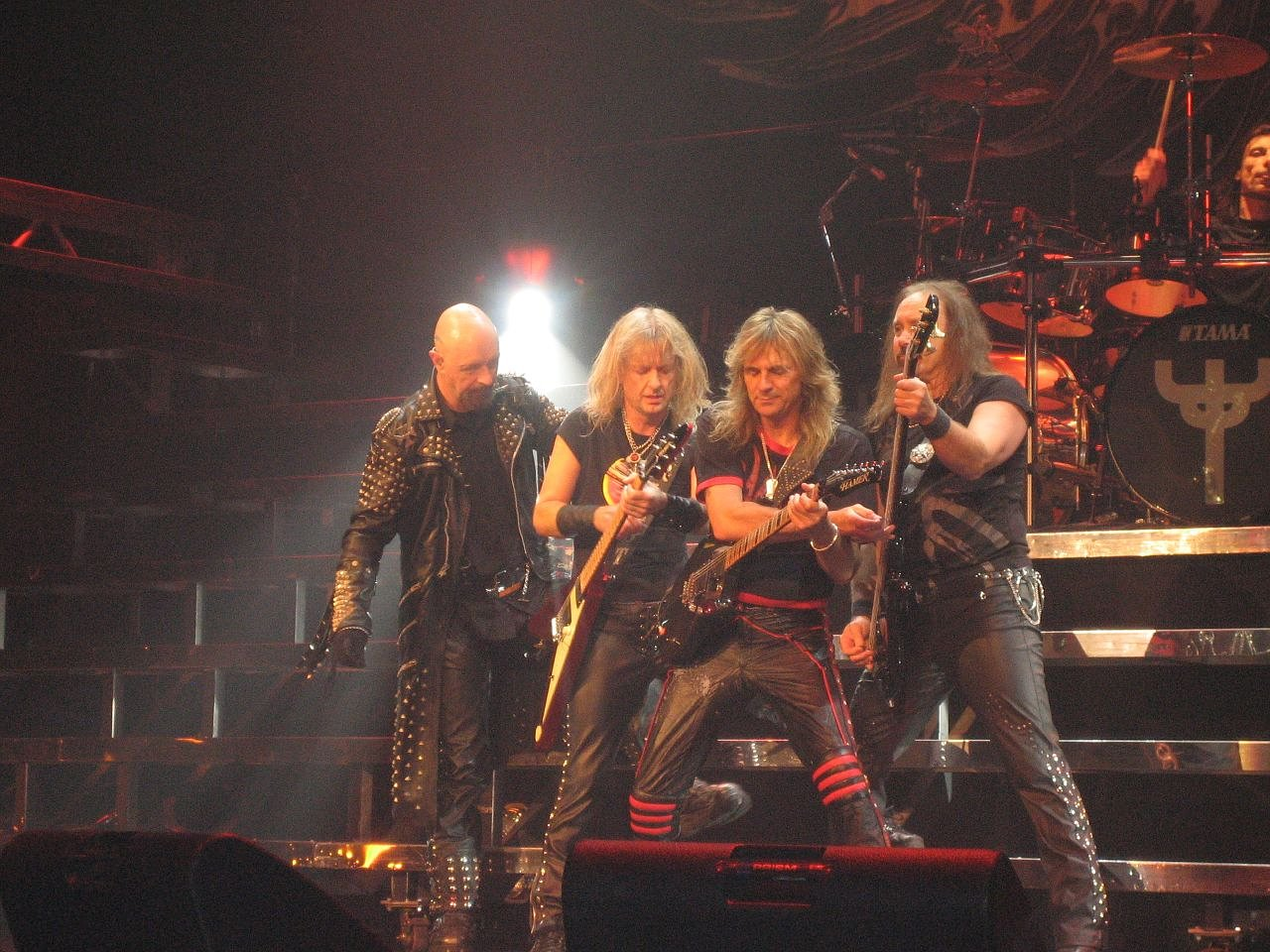
The reunited Judas Priest performing in 2005

After eleven years apart, faced with an ever-growing demand for a reunion, Judas Priest and Rob Halford announced they would reunite in July 2003, to coincide with the release of the Metalogy box set (despite Halford's earlier insistence that he "would never do it"). They did a concert tour in Europe in 2004, and co-headlined the 2004 Ozzfest, being named as the "premier act" by almost all US media coverage of the event. Judas Priest and "Ripper" Owens parted amicably, with Owens joining American heavy metal band Iced Earth.

A new studio album, Angel of Retribution, was released on 1 March 2005 (US) on Sony Music/Epic Records to critical and commercial success, earning the band a 2005 Metal Hammer Golden Gods Award for Best Album. A global tour in support of the album ensued. As for the band Halford, writing for the fourth release was cut off. After the Retribution tour in June 2006, however, Halford announced he would create his own record company, Metal God Entertainment, where he would release all his solo material under his own control. In November 2006 he remastered his back catalogue and released it exclusively through Apple's iTunes Store. Two new songs allegedly set for the fourth release, "Forgotten Generation" and "Drop Out", were released through iTunes as well.

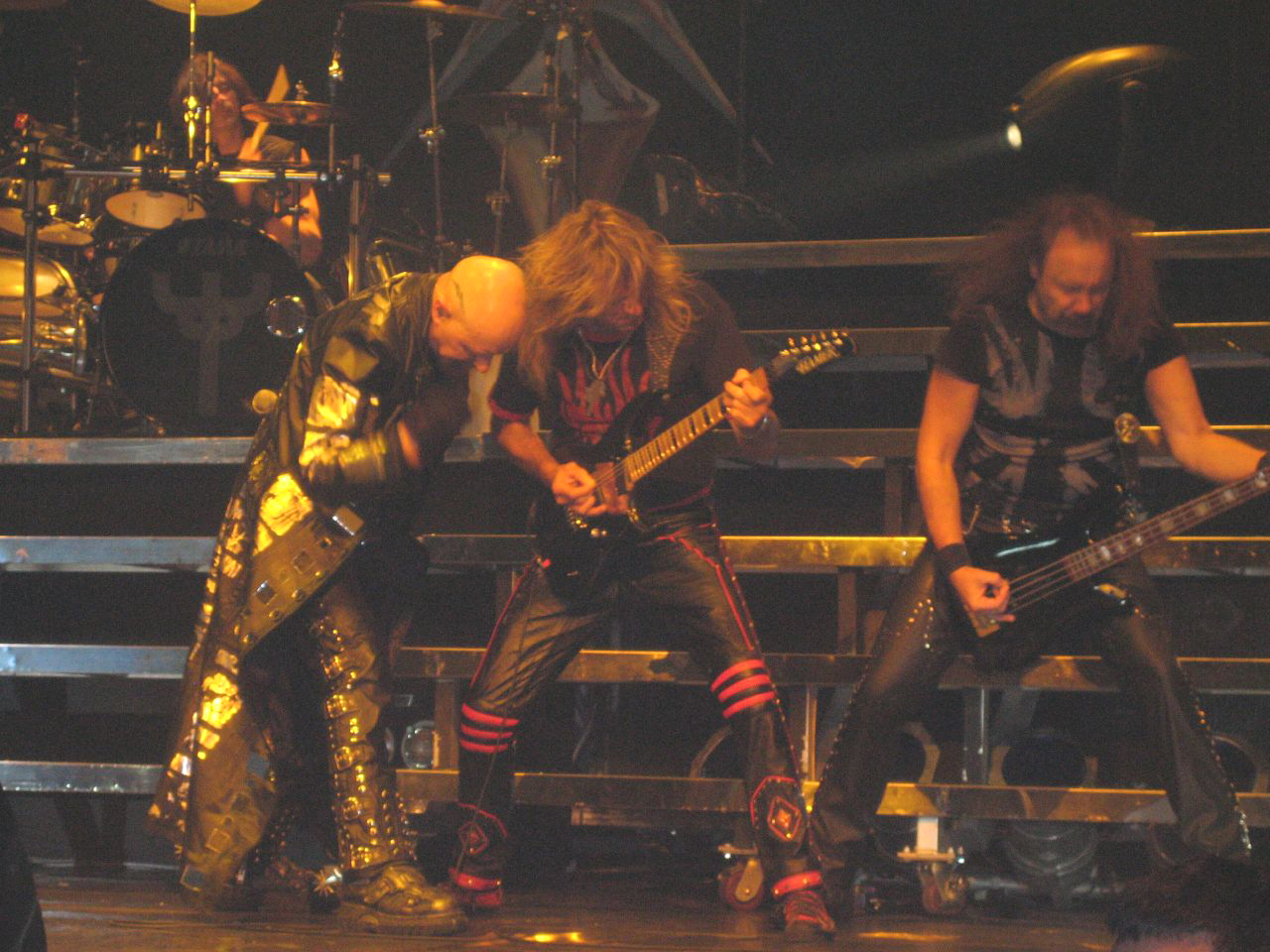
Judas Priest in typical heavy metal attire performing at the VH1 Rock Honors in Las Vegas on 25 May 2006.

Along with Queen, Kiss and Def Leppard, Judas Priest was an inaugural inductee into the "VH1 Rock Honors". The ceremony took place on 25 May 2006 in Las Vegas, Nevada, and first aired on 31 May. Their presentation was preceded by Godsmack performing a medley of "Electric Eye"/"Victim of Changes"/"Hell Bent for Leather." Judas Priest then played "Breaking the Law", "The Green Manalishi (With the Two Prong Crown)" and "You've Got Another Thing Comin'", before which Halford rode a Harley-Davidson motorcycle onstage.

=== Nostradamus (2006–2010) ===
In a June 2006 interview with MTV.com, Halford said of the group's concept album about the 16th-century French writer Nostradamus, "Nostradamus is all about metal, isn't he? He was an alchemist as well as a seer – a person of extraordinary talent. He had an amazing life that was full of trial and tribulation and joy and sorrow. He's a very human character and a world-famous individual. You can take his name and translate it into any language and everybody knows about him, and that's important because we're dealing with a worldwide audience." In addition to digging new lyrical ground for the band, the album would contain musical elements which might surprise fans. "It's going to have a lot of depth", Halford said. "There'll be a lot of symphonic elements. We might orchestrate it, without it being overblown. There may be a massive choir at parts and keyboards will be featured more prominently, whereas they've always been in the background before." Nostradamus was released on 16 June 2008 in the UK, where it peaked at number 30 in their native and number 11 in the US, where it has sold over 500,000 copies worldwide by the following year. The band also began the album's supporting tour the following month.

In early February 2009, the band joined the ranks of bands speaking out against ticket-touting ("scalping"), issuing a statement condemning the practice of selling tickets at well above face value, and urging fans to buy tickets only from official sources. In the same month, Judas Priest continued their tour, bringing their "Priest Feast" (with guests Megadeth and Testament) to multiple arenas in England, Wales, Scotland, and Ireland in February and March 2009. From there the tour progressed to multiple venues in Sweden. Later in March, Judas Priest performed in Portugal (at Lisbon on the Atlantic Pavilion), which they had not visited since 2005. The tour then continued to Milan, Italy, and then Paris, France; Halford had last performed with Judas Priest in Paris in 1991.

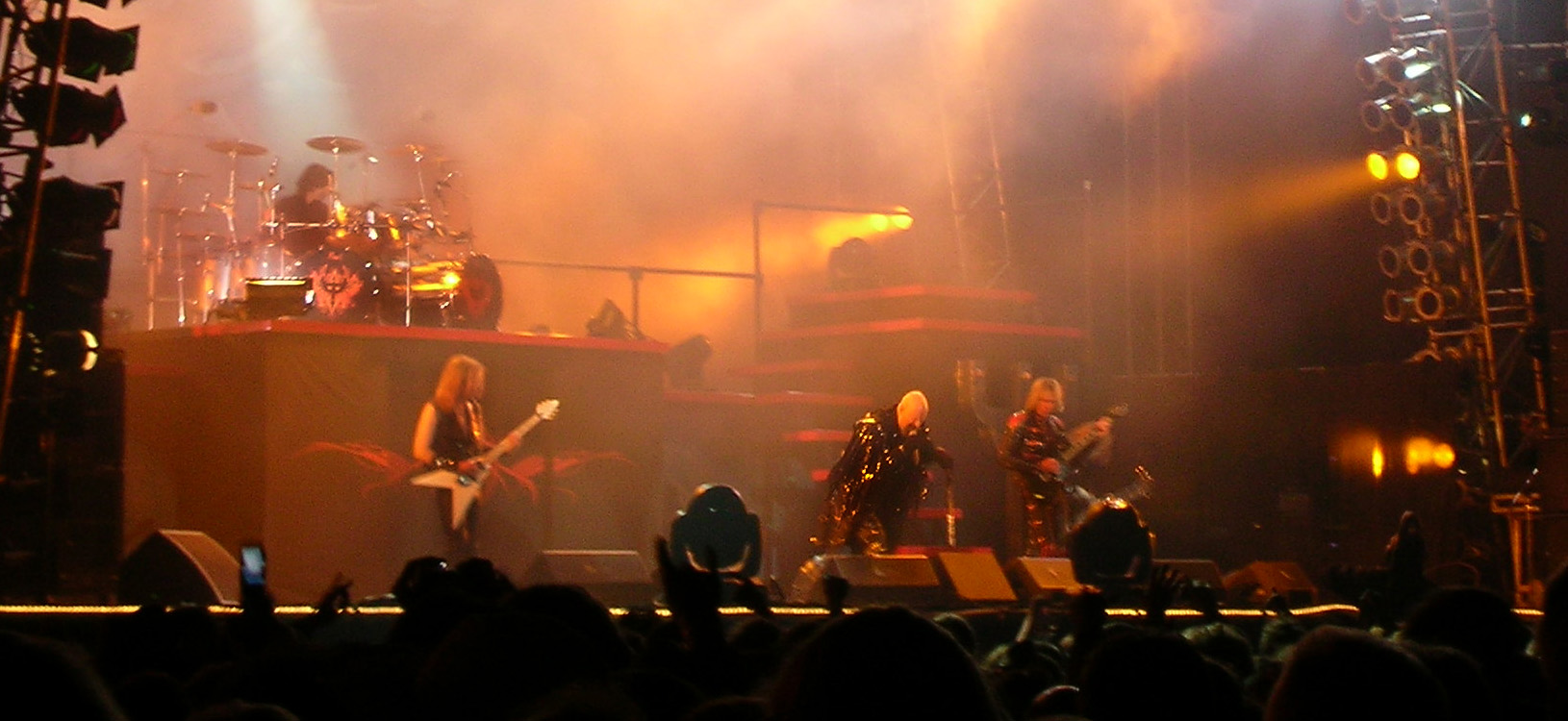
Judas Priest headlined the Sweden Rock Festival in June 2008.

From June through August 2009, Judas Priest completed a North American tour to commemorate the 30th anniversary of the release of British Steel (1980); the album was performed in its entirety on each tour date, with some other songs thrown in. This tour was to be a joint effort with fellow Englishman David Coverdale and Whitesnake. Unfortunately, Whitesnake would have to leave the tour after the show in Denver, Colorado on 11 August 2009 due to Coverdale falling ill with a serious throat infection; he was advised to stop singing immediately to avoid permanently damaging his vocal cords.

On 14 July 2009, Judas Priest released a new live album, featuring 11 previously unreleased live tracks from the 2005 and 2008 world tours, titled A Touch of Evil: Live. The performance of "Dissident Aggressor" won the 2010 Grammy Award for Best Metal Performance.

In May 2010, Halford said the band had been offered a star on the Hollywood Walk of Fame, but "we've just never been there when they wanted to do the ceremony." He also revealed that a Nostradamus tour was still being contemplated: "We were in Hollywood recently and met with some producers and agents, so there are a lot of things going on behind the scenes."

=== Downing's retirement and Epitaph World Tour (2010–2011) ===
Judas Priest announced on 7 December 2010, that their Epitaph World Tour would be the band's farewell tour and would run up until 2012. In a January 2011 interview, Halford said about the band's impending retirement: "I think it's time, you know. We're not the first band to say farewell, it's just the way everyone comes to at some point and we're gonna say a few more things early next year, so I think the main thing that we just want to ask everybody to consider is don't be sad about this, start celebrating and rejoicing over all the great things we've done in Judas Priest."

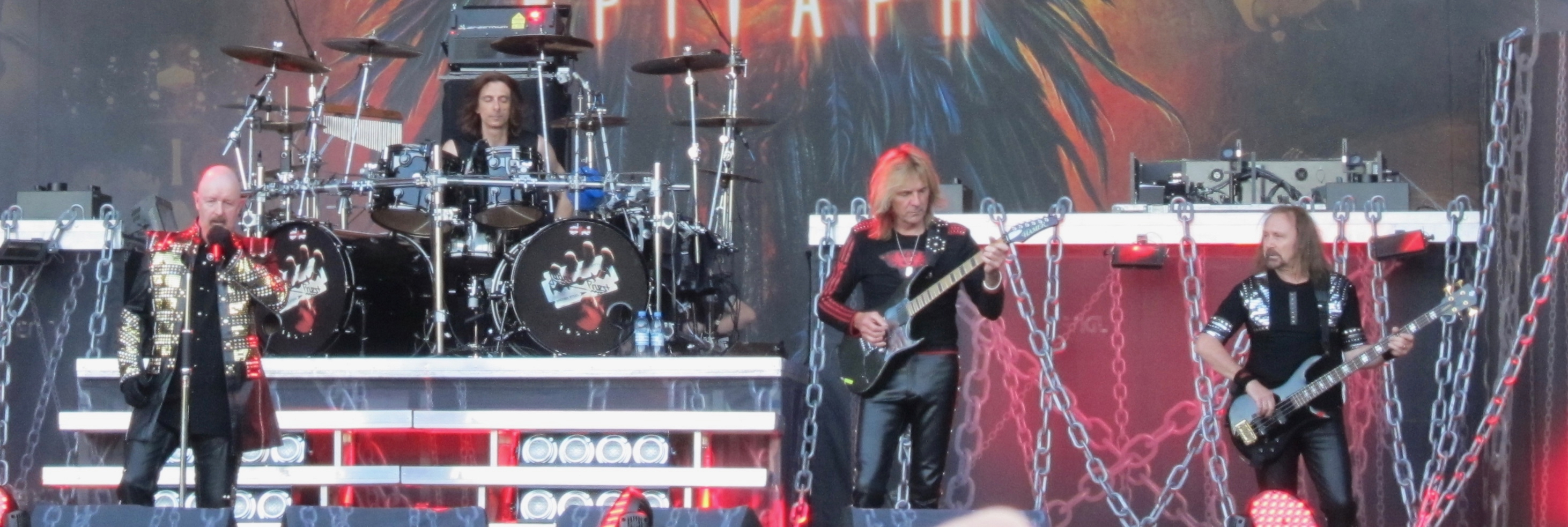
Judas Priest performing at the Sauna Open Air in 2011

On 27 January 2011, it was announced that Judas Priest were in the process of writing new material; the band also clarified their plans for the future, saying, "this is by no means the end of the band. In fact, we are presently writing new material, but we do intend this to be the last major world tour." Speaking at a press conference in Los Angeles on 26 May of the new material Glenn Tipton said: "It's quite a mixed bag. Really, there's more sentiment on this album. In a way, I suppose, it's also our farewell album, although it might not be our last one. There are some anthems on there, which pay tribute to our fans".

On 20 April 2011, it was announced that K. K. Downing had retired from the band and would not complete the Epitaph World Tour. Downing cited differences with the band and the management, and a breakdown in their relationship. Richie Faulkner, guitarist for Lauren Harris' band, was announced as his replacement for the Epitaph World Tour. Downing's retirement left bassist Ian Hill as the longest-serving member of the band.

On 25 May 2011, Judas Priest played during the finale of American Idol season 10 with James Durbin, making it their first live performance without K.K. Downing. The band played a mixture of two songs: "Living After Midnight" and "Breaking the Law".

On 7 June 2011, the band announced that it planned to release the box set Single Cuts, a collection of singles, the following August.

=== Redeemer of Souls (2011–2015) ===
In an August 2011 interview with Billboard, Halford explained that he and Tipton had "about 12 or 14 tracks completely mapped out" for a new studio album, with four of those tracks already recorded and mixed. The band made a point to take its time with the album, with Halford explaining "I'm of the attitude it'll be ready when it's ready ... I don't think we're going to slack off. We're determined to do a lot of work and be just as dedicated as we've always been and take a lot of care and attention with all the songs. We're not going to just bang this one out, so to speak."

On 13 September 2011, Priest announced its plans to release a new compilation album, The Chosen Few, a set of Priest songs chosen by other iconic heavy metal musicians.

On 5 June 2013, Halford confirmed that the Epitaph World Tour would not be the band's final tour. On 22 December, Judas Priest released a short Christmas message on their official website, which confirmed that they would be releasing their next album in 2014.

On 17 March 2014 at the Ronnie James Dio Awards in Los Angeles, Halford announced that the band's 17th studio album was finished. On 28 April, the band released the album's title track "Redeemer of Souls" for streaming on their official website. On 14 May 2014, the band's original guitarist Ernie Chataway died at the age of 62 from cancer, as reported by vocalist Al Atkins. Redeemer of Souls was released on 8 July 2014. It sold around 32,000 copies in the United States on its first week, peaking at number six on the US Billboard 200 chart, the band's highest charting position in the US at that time. This was also the band's first top-ten album on the Billboard 200. The band went on tour in support of the album which ran from 1 October 2014 until 17 December 2015. The Redeemer of Souls Tour led to the sixth live album Battle Cry, which was released on 25 March 2016 after being recorded at the Wacken Open Air festival in Germany on 1 August 2015.

=== Firepower and Tipton's retirement from touring (2015–2019) ===
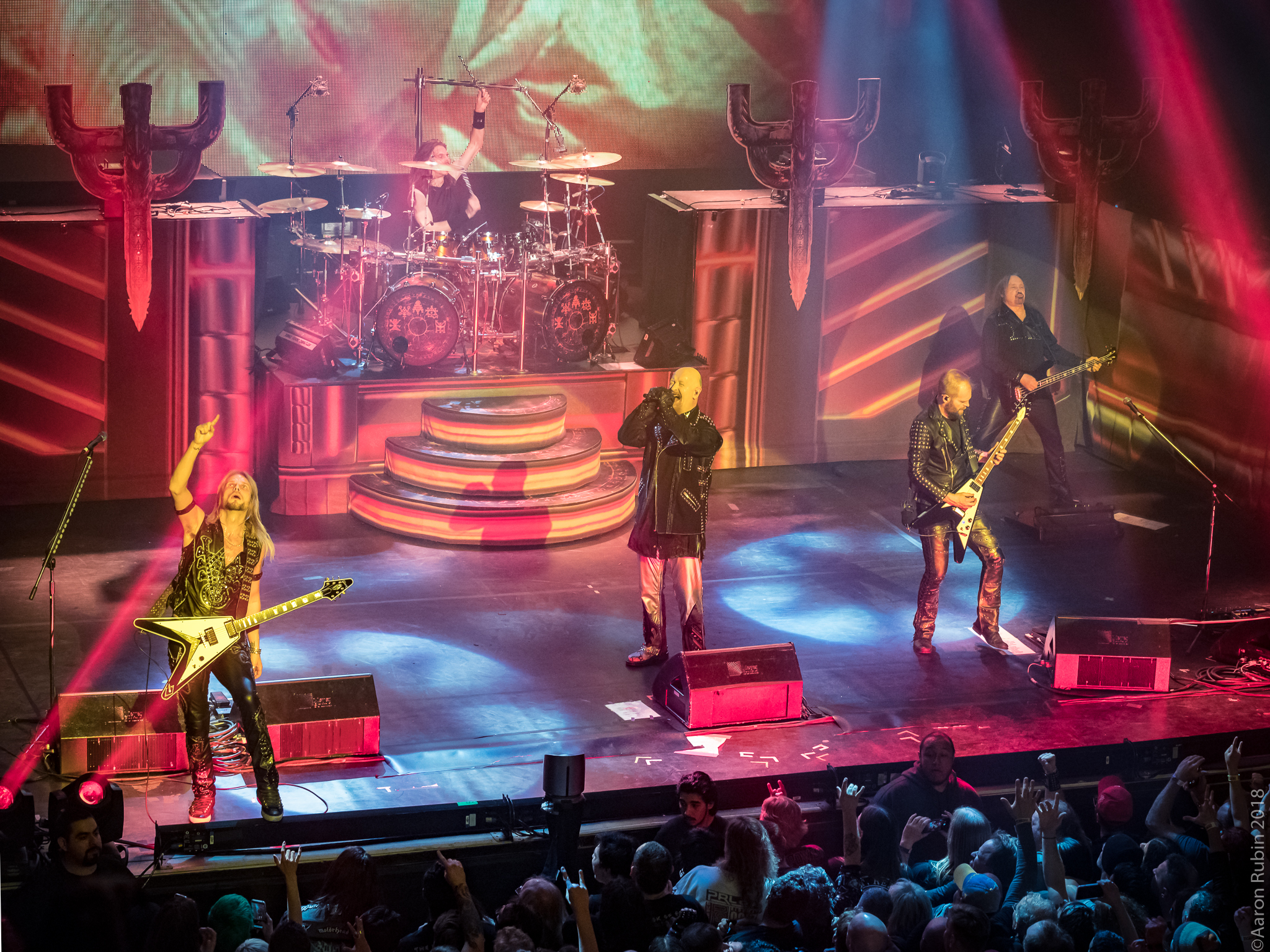
Judas Priest performing at the Warfield Theatre in San Francisco on 19 April 2018, as part of the Firepower World Tour, which featured Andy Sneap filling in for Glenn Tipton on guitar.

In a November 2015 interview with Reverb.com, Richie Faulkner said that the band would start work on their eighteenth studio album in 2016. In April 2016, Loudwire posted a photo showing Rob Halford, Glenn Tipton and Faulkner himself in the studio beginning the process of the album, with Halford confirming in a radio interview that it would be ready by early 2017. During an interview at the 2016 edition of the Rock 'n' Roll Fantasy Camp, Halford expressed dissatisfaction on making an album similar to Redeemer of Souls. Faulkner then stated that the band would begin recording in January 2017 and also said that they would not go on tour until 2018.

In March 2017, the band entered the studio to begin the recording process, with support from long time producer Tom Allom, along with former Sabbat guitarist and producer Andy Sneap and engineer Mike Exeter, who worked with the band on the previous album. This marked the first time since 1988's Ram It Down that they had worked with Allom. In an April 2017 interview with Planet Rock, Halford said that the band was "coming to some of the final moments" of completion of the new album. He also promised "a very exciting 2018 period" with a world tour taking place in 2018. In an Instagram post in June 2017, Sneap said that the band completed tracking.

The eighteenth album, Firepower, was released on 9 March 2018, with a world tour taking place thereafter, beginning in North America with Saxon and Black Star Riders as their support acts. Firepower achieved a new peak in the US, where it peaked at number five, where it sold over 49,000 copies in its first week of release. It also charted number 5 in the UK—the band's second top-ten album hit in their native since British Steel last charted at number 4 in 1980.

On 12 February 2018, Glenn Tipton revealed that he had Parkinson's disease and would step down from touring. According to the band, the disease's progression left him unable to play the more challenging material. Tipton stated that he was still a member of the band despite his diagnosis and did not rule out future on-stage appearances. Andy Sneap was then announced as his replacement for the tour. Richie Faulkner later assured fans that Tipton would perform with the band "at some point in the tour." At the 20 March 2018 show in Newark, New Jersey, Tipton joined the band on stage to perform "Metal Gods", "Breaking the Law" and "Living After Midnight", then "Victim of Changes" and "No Surrender" on later dates. He continued to appear for encores throughout the remainder of the Firepower World Tour.

On 29 January 2019, Judas Priest's European tour with Ozzy Osbourne was cancelled after Osbourne experienced a severe upper-respiratory infection. The band later confirmed that the tour was rescheduled to 2020.

=== 50th anniversary and Invincible Shield (2019–2024) ===
In a March 2019 interview with Australia's May the Rock Be with You, Rob Halford stated that there would be a new studio album in the foreseeable future, and that Tipton had already started composing riffs. Bassist Ian Hill said that the band had "some very strong ideas that were left out of Firepower which we never got around to completing. So it's very much on the cards. When that will happen, I don't know." Despite Tipton's condition, Faulkner said that he would "very much be involved in the creation of the next record." Halford said that the band began compiling ideas for the next album, but said that Firepower would be difficult to top.

The writing sessions began in February 2020, with Andy Sneap and Tom Allom returning to contribute to the album's production. Faulkner said that a month's worth of songs was written prior to the COVID-19 lockdowns, and that the band would eventually begin composing material. Halford said that Tipton contributed material during the writing process, describing the songs as "monsters. Even in a very, very rough, primitive stage, they're great — they're really, really good." He explained that the album would capture "the emotion of what we're going through together."

Judas Priest were originally scheduled to embark on the 50 Heavy Metal Years Tour in 2020 in Europe and North America, but was pushed back to 2021 due to the COVID-19 pandemic; however, due to its continued presence, the European leg was pushed back to 2022. They returned to the stage on 15 August 2021 as they headlined the Bloodstock Open Air festival, once again rejoined by Tipton for the encore songs. As the tour began on 8 September, the remainder of the US tour was postponed as Faulkner was hospitalized for major medical heart condition issues. It was rescheduled for the spring of 2022 with Queensrÿche as their support band, while the European leg with Ozzy Osbourne was rescheduled for 2023. However, Osbourne cancelled all shows for that year for health reasons.

On 29 April 2021, former drummer John Hinch died at the age of 73, as confirmed by Halford on Instagram. When speaking about the upcoming album, Halford said that the band had "a bunch of great new ideas for tracks, lots of really strong demos", describing it as being "a very potent record". Ian Hill said that there was enough material for at least an album or two, expressing doubt that it would be released before 2023 due to the band's tour schedule. Halford confirmed Tipton's appearance on the album.

In January 2022, Judas Priest announced the departure of Andy Sneap as he would shift his focus on his production work while the band continued as a quartet; however, the decision was retracted and he was reinstated. In regards to the album's musical direction, Faulkner and Halford said that it would take a more progressive approach than Firepower, but Faulkner elaborated on its meaning. Tipton assured that it would be "what every Priest fan will want", while explaining that the tracks may or may not fancy the fans' taste, but expressed satisfaction in its sound. Faulkner described it being different to Firepower. While the album was completely written, he said that "we need to record it properly and everything like that. So it's not really anywhere near done. But when it's done, it's done." Halford indicated that it would not be released until 2023 or 2024, but later confirmed its release for 2024.

The band performed at the Wacken Open Air festival in August of 2022. On 5 November 2022, Judas Priest were inducted into the Rock and Roll Hall of Fame by Alice Cooper as they received the Musical Excellence Award. The other inductees included were former members K.K. Downing, Les Binks, and Dave Holland. The band performed a three-song set with Downing and Binks on stage. This was one of Binks' final public appearances before he died in 2025.

Before the band's performance at the Power Trip festival on 7 October 2023, they revealed their next album Invincible Shield, following their lead single, "Panic Attack" being released the following month. These were also followed by "Trial By Fire", "Crown of Horns", and "The Serpent and the King". Invincible Shield was released on 8 March 2024 and achieved the highest position in the UK, where it debuted at number two, and charted at number 18 in the US. The group embarked on an album tour following its release.

=== The Ballad of Judas Priest, Ian Hill's retirement and upcoming twentieth studio album (2024–present) ===
In a February 2024 interview with Audio Ink Radio, guitarist Richie Faulkner was asked if Judas Priest had "many more albums left" in them. His reply was, "I know personally, whenever we kind of put the writing sessions to bed and we finish the writing and everything, I always feel spent. I'm out of ideas. I've got nothing left, I've given everything to it. Where the hell am I gonna get more ideas from if we choose to do another record? But somehow they always, over the next couple of years, you start banking new riffs and melodies and stuff, and somehow you get a new ones. So you never know what the future holds." When commenting on the possibility of a twentieth studio album, Halford said that "it's inevitable there will be something else."

In an October 2024 interview with KNAC.com, Faulkner was asked if Judas Priest were going to continue touring in 2025 or planning to hit the studio to write and record another album. His reply was, "I think a bit of both, really. These tours tend to grow and evolve over time — the more we do, we get more offers from different territories and stuff — so I'm sure there'll be more touring. And there's always ideas coming up, there's always creative juices flowing. So if we're able, we might be able to get in and put some ideas together and see where we are. Is there another record? I know we've got ideas coming up all the time — riffs and melodies and song ideas and stuff. We're creative people — as a group of creative people, that's gonna happen. So I think, hopefully if we get some time early next year, we'll be able to pool those ideas and see what we've got and then hopefully hit the road again somewhere else."

In a March 2025 interview with PowerOfMetal.cl, Faulkner said that the band began talks regarding the next album; both him and drummer Scott Travis hoping to begin work in 2026. On 15 March 2025, former drummer Les Binks died at the age of 73. In September Judas Priest released a cover of "War Pigs" featuring Ozzy Osbourne. The project originally started as a video tribute for Black Sabbath as Judas Priest would not be able perform at the Back to the Beginning farewell concert in July 2025, due to a prior commitment to the Scorpions' 60th anniversary show. However Judas Priest suggested upgrading the tribute into a full song, Osbourne quickly agreed. The vocals were tracked shortly before Osbourne's death making the song his first posthumous release.

In a March 2026 interview with The Metal Voice, Faulkner revealed that the band had entered the studio the month before to begin recording their new album. Bassist Ian Hill announced in May 2026 that the album is expected to be released in 2027: "It'll be out some time next year. It'll be out probably March, April, something like that, I should imagine. That's down to the record company."

An official documentary about the band, The Ballad of Judas Priest, was premiered at the 76th Berlin International Film Festival on 15 February 2026 and at the Hot Docs Canadian International Documentary Festival from 23 April to 3 May. To coincide with the documentary, Sony Music released a compilation album, titled The Best of Judas Priest, on 19 June 2026; it included tracks from the band's first twelve studio albums (with the exception of Sad Wings of Destiny and Ram It Down), in addition to "Lightning Strike" from Firepower and "Crown of Horns" from Invincible Shield.

On 9 October 2026, it was announced that Hill had retired from Judas Priest due to complications from arthritis. Uriah Heep bassist Dave Rimmer was announced as his replacement.

== Artistry ==
=== Musical style and influences ===
Judas Priest's style has always been rooted in heavy metal, and many of their albums reflect diverse aspects of the genre. Their debut album, Rocka Rolla (1974), is primarily rooted in heavy blues rock. According to Tim Hall of The Guardian, "The early Judas Priest albums contained an eclectic mix of styles. Out-and-out rockers sat alongside acoustic ballads, the odd quirky cover and ambitious multi-part epics that owed as much to Queen as to Black Sabbath."

From their second album, Sad Wings of Destiny (1976), through to their fourth, Stained Class (1978), the band's style was somewhat progressive, with complex guitar passages and poetic lyrics. Songs would often shift in dynamics and tempo, and the music was some of the heaviest of its day. Sin After Sin (1977) used a combination of double bass drum (or "double kick") and rapid 16th-note bass rhythms combined with rapid 16th-note guitar rhythms used by Black Sabbath, Venom, and Motörhead that came to define the genre. While the double-bass rhythms used by Judas Priest are generally measured and technical, the song "Dissident Aggressor" (from Sin After Sin) pushed an increase in "tempo and aggression", which was later adopted by other bands with a much harder-edged approach.

Starting with their fifth album, Killing Machine (1978), the band began to incorporate a more commercial, radio-friendly style to their music. British Steel (1980) has been referred to as the "record that, more than any other, codified what we mean by heavy metal". The lyrics and music were simplified, and this style prevailed up to their seventh album, Point of Entry (1981). With their eighth album, Screaming for Vengeance (1982), the band incorporated a balance of these two styles. This continued on Defenders of the Faith (1984). With the follow-up album, Turbo (1986), the band incorporated guitar synthesizers into its signature heavy metal sound. On Ram It Down (1988), the band retained some of the more commercial qualities of Turbo but also returned to some of the fast tempo heavy metal found on their earlier works. This fast-tempo style continued with Painkiller (1990). Jugulator (1997) tried to incorporate some of the 1990s contemporary groove metal styles. Demolition (2001) has a more traditional heavy metal sound with nu metal elements. Following the return of Halford for Angel of Retribution and Nostradamus, the band returned to the style of its early albums.

Halford listened to and was influenced by Little Richard, Elvis Presley, Janis Joplin, and Robert Plant as a vocalist. He learned to push to the limits of his vocal abilities by their vocal demonstrations on record. He developed a powerful, operatic vocal style with an impressive range from lower throaty growls to ear-piercing high screams with strong vibrato. He was also a fan of Freddie Mercury, referring to him as his ultimate hero.

=== Fashion ===
In addition to the sound, Judas Priest are also known for being revolutionary in heavy metal fashion. In the band's early years, they dressed in hippie-style 1970s outfits, but as the decade drew to a close, the rise of punk rock made this look outdated, so the band began wearing simplified wardrobes on their 1978 tour. For the 1979 tour, Halford adopted his now-trademark leather-and-studs look, inspired by punk fashion and leather culture. The rest of the band adopted a similar style which became prominent at the time of their 1978 release, Killing Machine. This style would go on to be adopted by many heavy metal bands in the early 1980s, especially those of the new wave of British heavy metal and early black metal movements. To this day, it is not uncommon to find metal artists and fans sporting such a look at concerts.

In a published quote on the back cover of K. K. Downing's autobiography Heavy Duty: Days and Nights in Judas Priest, Downing said that Judas Priest "had a bit of an identity crisis from the beginning. There was always a bit of a question mark about the band's look. To me, it never seemed to say anything—and in the earliest days of our career, I suppose I actually saw that as a good thing."

Downing said he was the one who came up with the band's black-leather look back when he first started in the music business: "I had this Heavy Metal attitude inside of me. I had it all of my life. When I got into Judas Priest I knew I had a band that had a great name. I knew we were a great band ... but something was not quite complete. The leather and studs image came along and it all started to complete itself. We had the album cover with the razor blade ... and Heavy Metal was born, mate. I was a youngster and it came to me. Around 1976 is when it happened. The band took to it and got on with it, really."

Although Halford adopted the gay leather fetish wear for the band's look, he stated that he "had no interest in S&M, domination or the whole queer subcult of leather and chains" because he is a vanilla gay man. He feels that fans of the era also did not suspect a homosexual or kink subtext in the leather-and-studs look. After Halford's coming out as gay, modern listeners often identify Judas Priest as having queer themes in their lyrics and fashion.

== Legacy and influence ==
Judas Priest have influenced a great deal of metal music since the late 1970s. The band's popularity and status as one of the exemplary and influential heavy metal bands has earned them the nickname "Metal Gods" from their song of the same name. AllMusic described them as one of the most influential heavy metal bands of all time, and the one that spearheaded the New Wave of British Heavy Metal. They were ranked by MTV as the second "Greatest Metal Band" of all time (after Black Sabbath), VH1 named them the 78th greatest artist of all time in 2010, and Loudwire ranked them the fourth best metal band in 2016.

Speaking to Rolling Stone about his favourite albums and his appreciation of heavy metal bands, Bill Ward of Black Sabbath said of Judas Priest, "they have their soul and they know who they are, and… they know what metal is. They understand the basic, primal scream of metal…They’re so exciting."

The band have sold over 50 million albums, including eleven top 30 albums in the United Kingdom. In the United States, the band had eleven consecutive albums to be certified gold, platinum or higher by the RIAA, starting with 1977's Sin After Sin.

Several metal bands have named themselves after classic era Judas Priest songs and albums, including Sinner, Exciter, Running Wild, Steeler and Tyrant.

Judas Priest's music has been cited as both influential and inspirational to many bands, including Accept, Annihilator, Anthrax, Cannibal Corpse, Dark Angel, Death, Death Angel, Def Leppard, Destruction, Dokken, Dream Theater, Exodus, Fates Warning, Flotsam and Jetsam, Heathen, Helloween, Iced Earth, Iron Maiden, Kreator, Megadeth, Mercyful Fate, Metal Church, Metallica, Mötley Crüe, Nuclear Assault, Obituary, Onslaught, Overkill, Pantera, Possessed, Queensrÿche, Sacrifice, Savatage, Saxon, Sepultura, Skid Row, Slayer, Sodom, Testament, Twisted Sister, Venom, Voivod, and W.A.S.P.

=== Awards, nominations, and critical reception ===
Despite their huge, loyal fanbase, Judas Priest have never been well-received by much of the music press, partially because their late 1970s rise coincided with the punk rock and new wave movements, which occupied much of the music press' attention at the time. The first edition of The Rolling Stone Album Guide gave their first three albums one star each and described the band as "for lovers of stolen Led Zeppelin riffs only". The second edition of the guide a few years later also panned their entire discography. Village Voice critic Robert Christgau was notably disdainful of the band, refusing to outright review any of their albums and relegating them to his "Meltdown" list (referring to artists he did not consider having any material worth listening to).

In 2018, Judas Priest were nominated for the Rock and Roll Hall of Fame, but not inducted. In the same year, they were inducted into the Hall of Heavy Metal History at the Wacken festival. Founder/CEO Pat Gesualdo thanked them "for the decades of hard work and dedication to heavy metal, an art form they helped establish." The band then stated that their induction "also sends a great message of inclusion for the metal community around the world, and keeps us defending the metal faith together." In 2022, the band was finally inducted into the Rock and Roll Hall of Fame as the recipients of the committee-selected "Award for Musical Excellence". Despite this, many outlets, including MetalSucks and Loudwire, were critical of the band being inducted via the "Award for Musical Excellence" rather than in the "Performer" category. Halford, after originally expressing excitement about the honour, shared this sentiment.

Classic Rock Roll of Honour Awards

Year	Nominee / work	Award	Result
2005	Judas Priest	The Metal Guru	Won

Decibel Hall of Fame

Year	Nominee / work	Award	Result
2018	Stained Class	Hall of Fame	Inducted
2021	Painkiller	Hall of Fame	Inducted

Grammy Awards

Year	Nominee / work	Award	Result
1991	Painkiller	Best Metal Performance	Nominated
1999	"Bullet Train"	Best Metal Performance	Nominated
2009	"Visions"	Best Hard Rock Performance	Nominated
2009	"Nostradamus"	Best Metal Performance	Nominated
2010	"Dissident Aggressor"	Best Metal Performance	Won
2025	"Crown of Horns"	Best Metal Performance	Nominated

Kerrang! Awards

Year	Nominee / work	Award	Result
2007	Judas Priest	Hall of Fame	Won
2015	Judas Priest	Inspiration	Won

Loudwire Music Awards

Year	Nominee / work	Award	Result
2015	Redeemer of Souls	Metal Album of the Year	Nominated
2015	Judas Priest	Metal Band of the Year	Nominated
2015	Judas Priest	Live Act of the Year	Nominated
2015	"Halls of Valhalla"	Metal Song of the Year	Nominated
2015	Rob Halford	Rock Titan of the Year	Nominated
2015	Rob Halford	Vocalist of the Year	Nominated
2015	Richie Faulkner	Guitarist of the Year	Nominated
2017	Rob Halford	Lemmy Lifetime Achievement Award	Won

Metal Hammer Golden Gods Awards (UK)

Year	Nominee / work	Award	Result
2005	Angel of Retribution	Best Album	Won
2011	Judas Presist	Icons	Won
2018	Judas Presist	Best British Band	Won

Metal Hammer Golden Gods Awards (Germany)

Year	Nominee / work	Award	Result
2018	"Firepower"	Metal Anthem	Nominated
2018	Judas Presist	Best International Band	Nominated
2018	Judas Presist	Maximum Metal Band	Won
2018	Glenn Tipton	Riff God	Nominated
2018	Glenn Tipton	Legend	Nominated
2024	Invincible Shield	Best Album	Won
2024	"Panic Attack"	Metal Anthem	Nominated

Metal Storm Awards

Year	Nominee / work	Award	Result
2005	Angel of Retribution	Best Heavy Metal Album	Won
2008	Nostradamus	Best Heavy Metal Album	Nominated
2014	Redeemer Of Souls	Best Heavy / Melodic Metal Album	Nominated
2018	Firepower	Best Heavy / Melodic Metal Album	Nominated
2018	Firepower	Biggest Surprise	Won
2024	Invincible Shield	Best Heavy / Traditional Metal Album	Won

Metal Hall of Fame

Year	Nominee / work	Award	Result
2019	Judas Priest	Hall of Fame	Inducted

Planet Rock Awards

Year	Nominee / work	Award	Result
2019	Firepower	Best British Album	Won

Polish Antyradio Awards

Year	Nominee / work	Award	Result
2018	"How To Tell You"	Best Rock Hit Abroad	Won

Revolver Golden Gods Awards

Year	Nominee / work	Award	Result
2010	Rob Halford	Golden God	Won
2012	Judas Priest	Best Live Band	Nominated

Rock and Roll Hall of Fame

Year	Nominee / work	Award	Result
2018	Judas Priest	Performers	Nominated
2020	Judas Priest	Performers	Nominated
2022	Judas Priest	Performers	Nominated
2022	Judas Priest	Award for Musical Excellence	Won

Sweden GAFFA Awards

Year	Nominee / work	Award	Result
2019	Judas Priest	Best Foreign Band	Nominated

== Band members ==
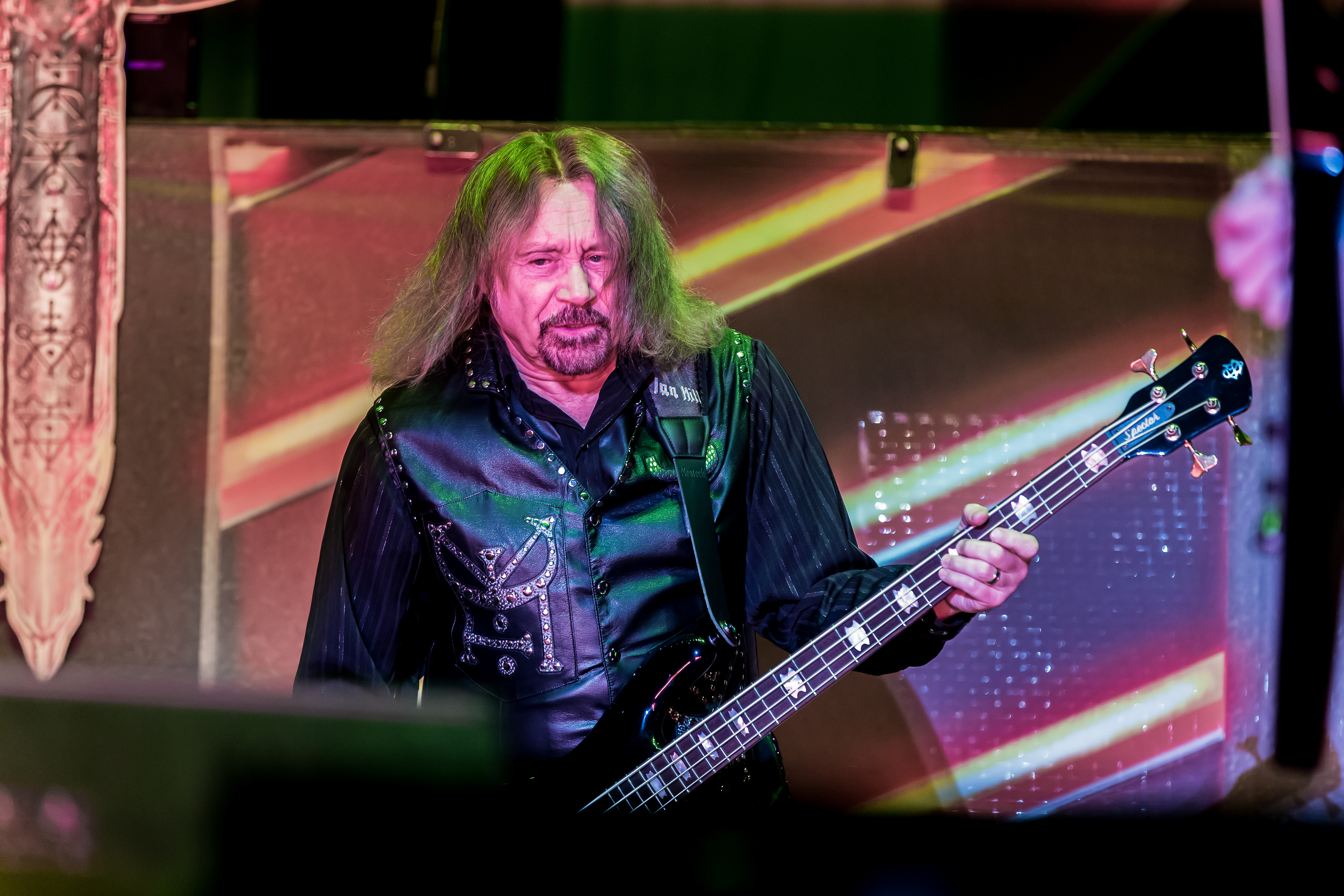
Hill

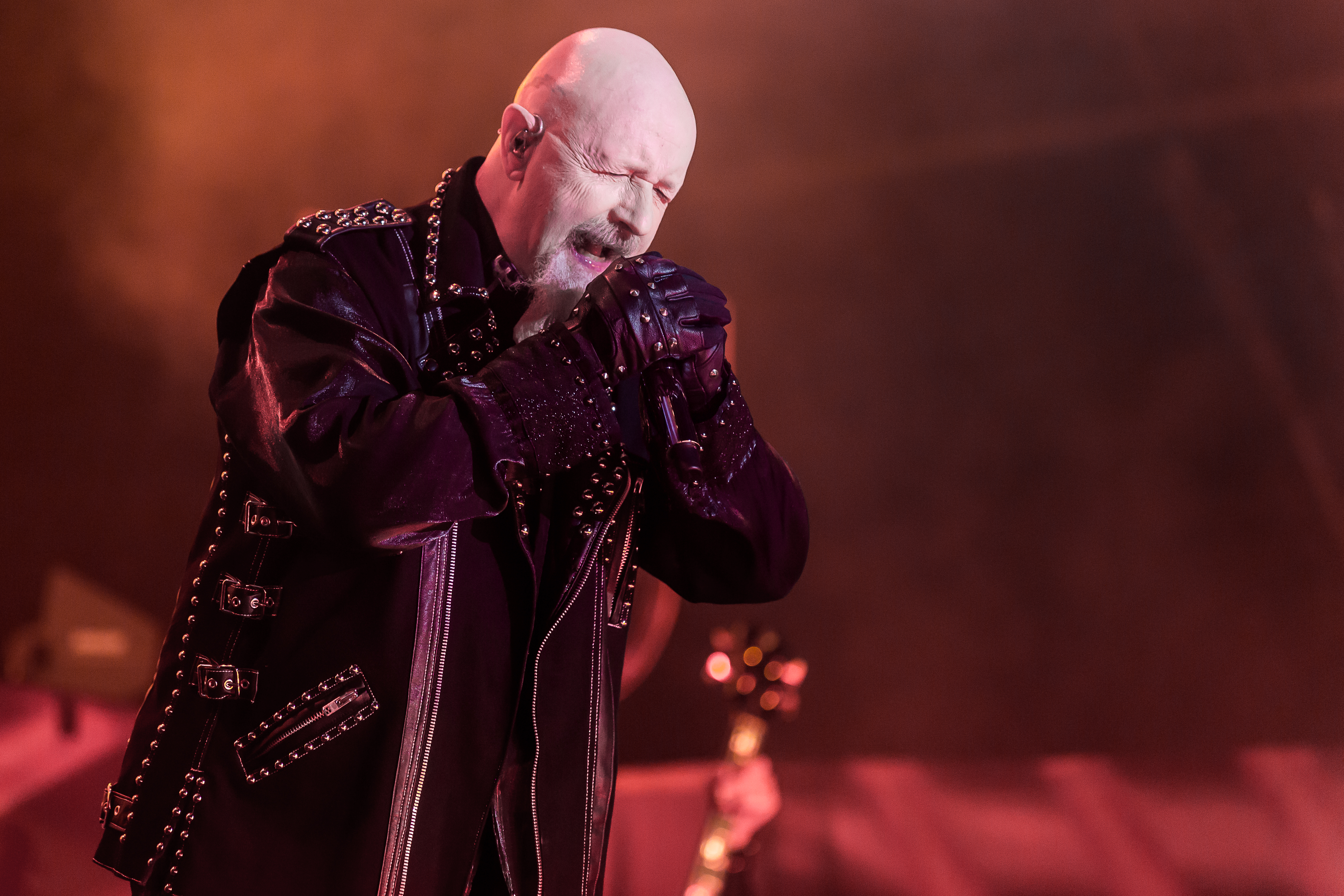
Halford

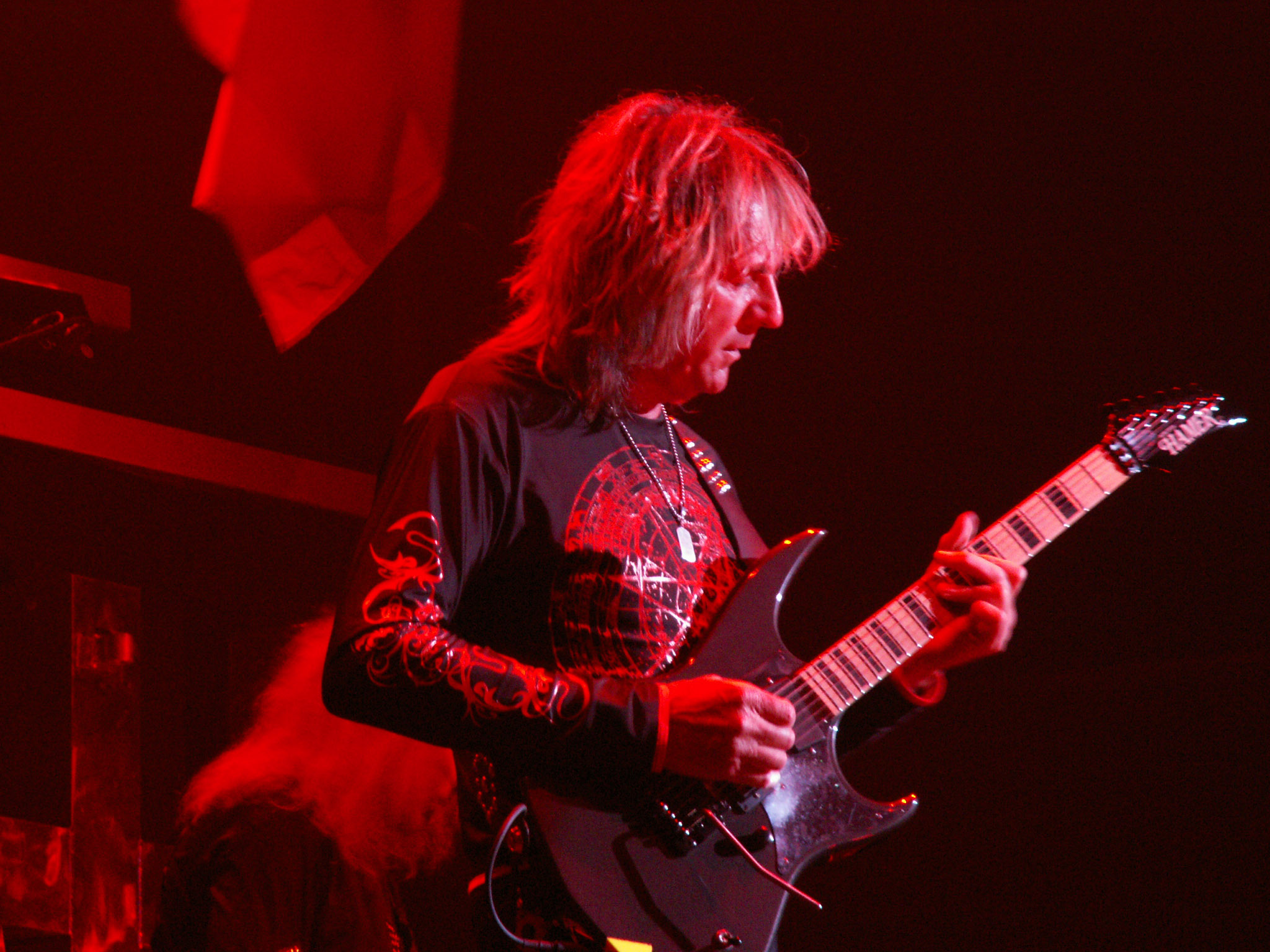
Tipton

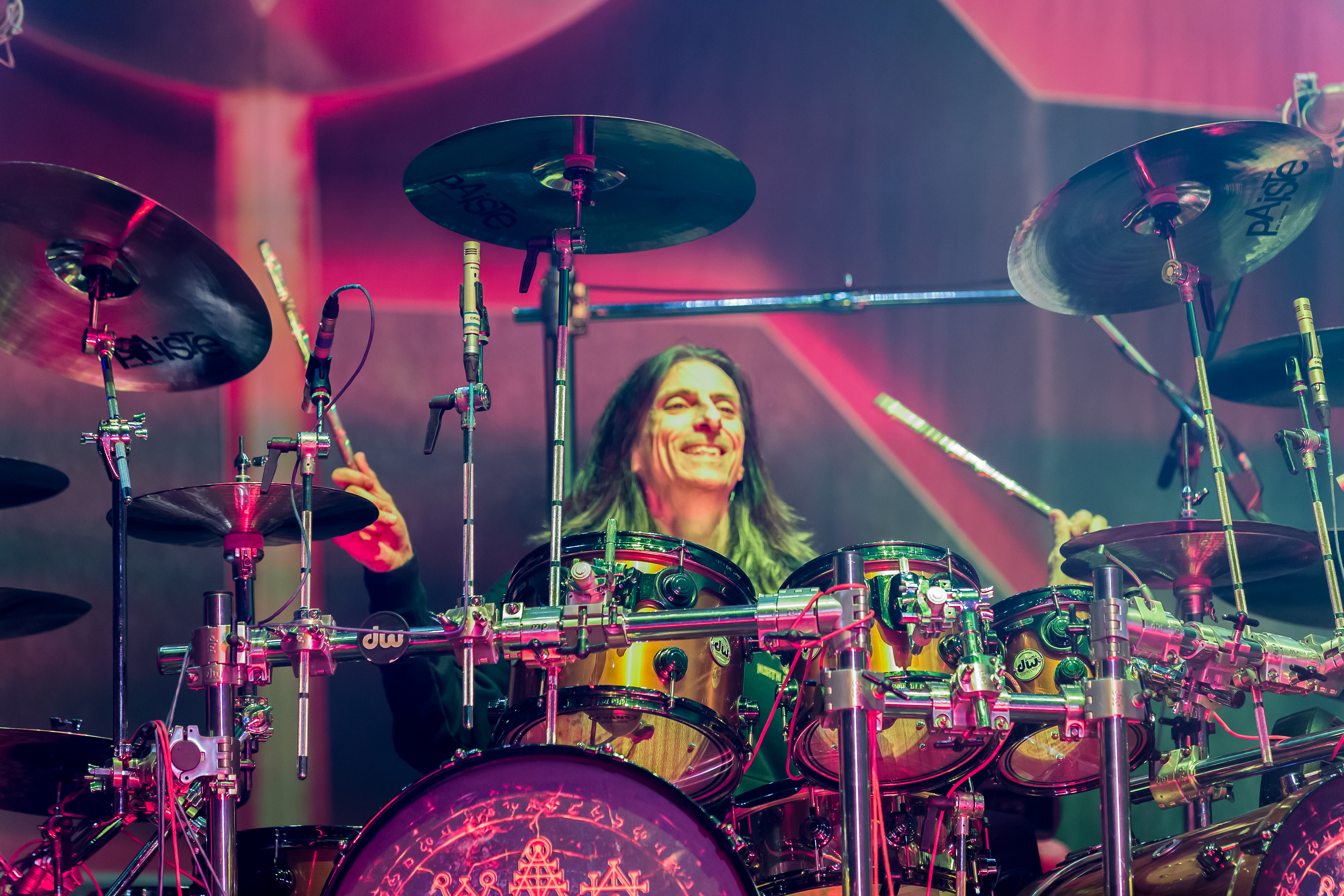
Travis

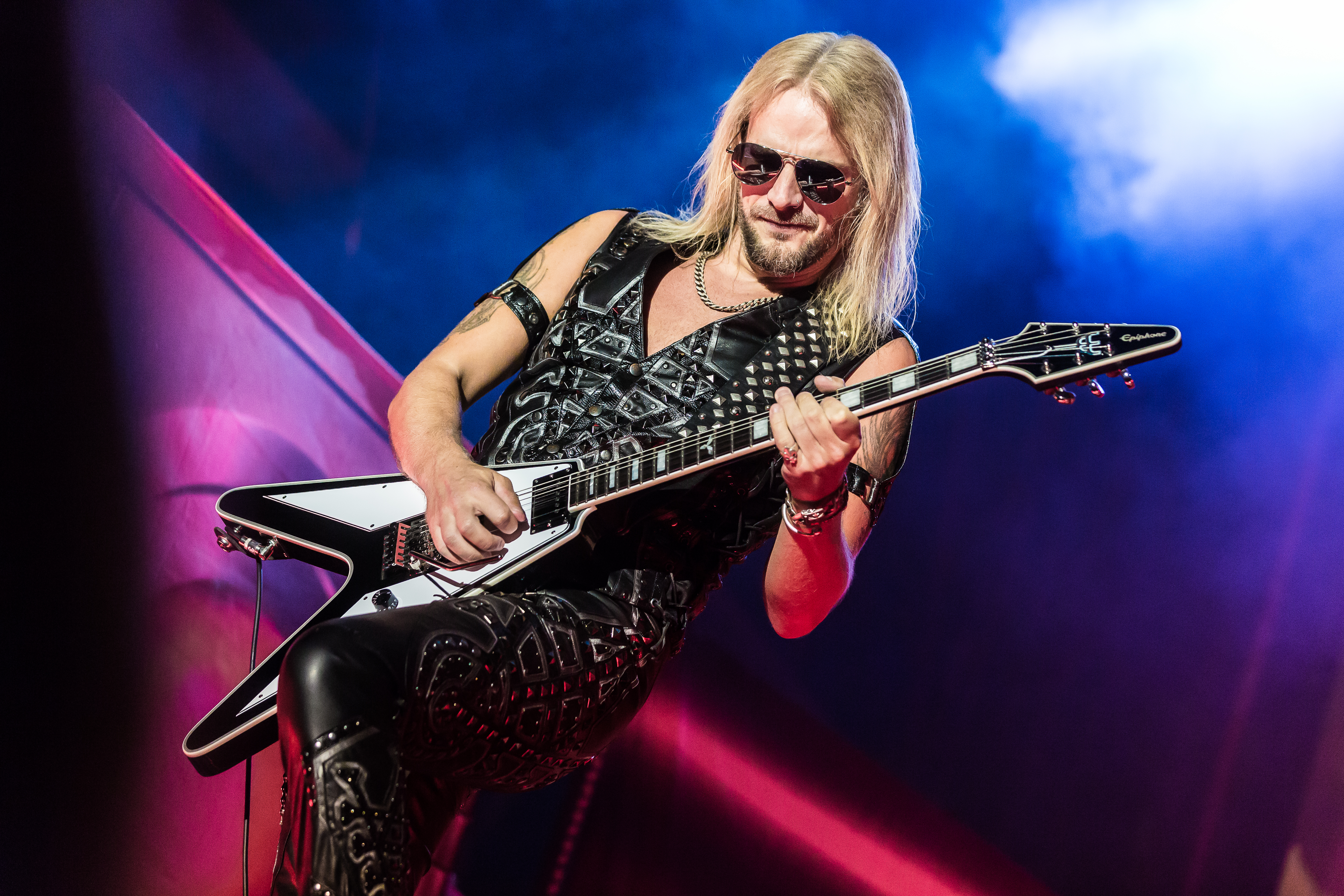
Faulkner

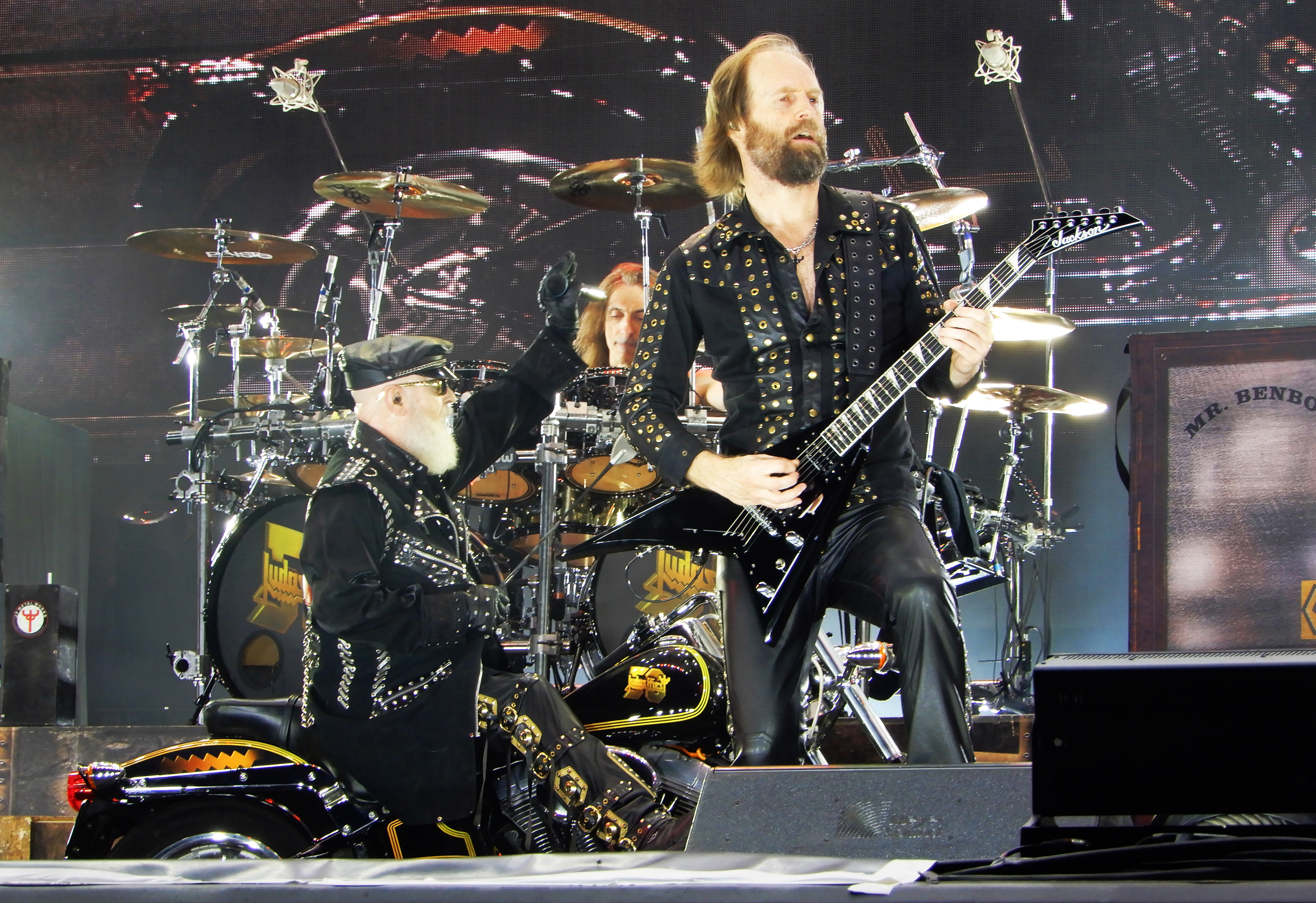
Sneap

Current

- Rob Halford – lead vocals (1973–1992, 2003–present)
- Glenn Tipton – guitars, backing vocals, keyboards (1974–1992, 1996–present)
- Scott Travis – drums, occasional backing vocals (1989–1992, 1996–present)
- Richie Faulkner – guitars, backing vocals (2011–present)
- Dave Rimmer – bass (2026–present)

Touring

- Andy Sneap – guitars, backing vocals (2018–2022, 2022–present) (Note: He briefly departed for 5 days in 2022.)

Timeline

== Discography ==
Studio albums

- Rocka Rolla (1974)
- Sad Wings of Destiny (1976)
- Sin After Sin (1977)
- Stained Class (1978)
- Killing Machine (also known as Hell Bent For Leather) (1978)
- British Steel (1980)
- Point of Entry (1981)
- Screaming for Vengeance (1982)
- Defenders of the Faith (1984)
- Turbo (1986)
- Ram It Down (1988)
- Painkiller (1990)
- Jugulator (1997)
- Demolition (2001)
- Angel of Retribution (2005)
- Nostradamus (2008)
- Redeemer of Souls (2014)
- Firepower (2018)
- Invincible Shield (2024)

== Concert tours ==
- Rocka Rolla Tour (1974–1975)
- Sad Wings of Destiny Tour (1976)
- Sin After Sin Tour (1977)
- Stained Class Tour (1978)
- Hell Bent for Leather Tour (1979)
- British Steel Tour (1980)
- World Wide Blitz Tour (1981)
- World Vengeance Tour (1982–1983)
- Metal Conqueror Tour (1984)
- Fuel for Life Tour (1986)
- Mercenaries of Metal Tour (1988)
- Painkiller Tour (1990–1991)
- Operation Rock & Roll (1991)
- Jugulator/'98 Live Meltdown Tour (1998)
- Demolition Tour (2001–2002)
- Reunited Tour (2004)
- Ozzfest (2004)
- Retribution Tour (2005)
- Metal Masters Tour (2008)
- Nostradamus World Tour (2008–2009)
- Epitaph/Farewell Tour (2011–2012)
- Redeemer of Souls Tour (2014–2015)
- Firepower World Tour (2018–2019)
- 50 Heavy Metal Years Tour (2021–2022)
- Invincible Shield Tour (2024–2025)
- Shield of Pain Tour (2025)
- Faithkeepers Tour (2026)

== In popular culture ==
The American director Rob Reiner went to see Judas Priest in concert as part of his preparation for making the film This Is Spinal Tap (1984), which spoofs British heavy metal bands.

The drama-comedy film Rock Star (2001), starring Mark Wahlberg, is loosely based on the story of how Tim "Ripper" Owens replaced Rob Halford as the vocalist in Judas Priest.

On 5 January 2014, the band appeared in the episode "Steal This Episode" of comedy cartoon show The Simpsons playing a parody of their song "Breaking the Law". Their music was referred to as "death metal", for which the producers subsequently apologised by having Bart Simpson write "Judas Priest is not 'Death Metal'" in the opening sequence chalkboard gag.

In 2025, a voice-over recording made by Toronto's WILDsound Film Festival contained a quietly read set of unknown song lyrics directly written for Rob Halford and Judas Priest titled "Dark Elder".
