= Tyrant (Japanese band) =

Japanese black metal band

- Origin: Japan
- Genres: Black metal Symphonic black metal
- Years active: 1994–present
- Label: Displeased Records
- Members: Keisuke "Z3" Kubo; Ayumi Kubo; Masato Date; Toshiya Nakamura; Yoshihiro Yamaji
- Past members: Iwata; Ryugo; Hidenori Tanaka; Masaya; Damien

Tyrant is a Japanese symphonic black metal band.

== History ==
=== 1994–1996 ===
Tyrant was found in December 1994 by Keisuke. They originally played a rawer, more straightforward style of black metal. Although Keisuke loved black metal, he believed that a lot of bands, such as Dark Funeral and Satyricon played it much better than them. Afterwards, he decided on being a symphonic black metal band. Things started to take shape after several lineup changes and the addition of Hidenori as the guitarist. Ayumi joined as the keyboards of the band and Masaya as the drums. Though Ayumi initially started on rhythm guitars, she soon found herself adding depth and a new dimension behind keyboards, where she had 10 years experience. They released their 2nd promo tape Under the Dark Mystic Sky in the autumn of 1995.

=== 1997–1998 ===
Tyrant had made their first album around this era. As a result, they got the deal with Pulverized Records in 1997. All in 1997, they absorbed themselves in a recording of their debut. They released their debut entitled Under the Dark Mystic Sky from the label in 1998, which was the same title as their 2nd promo tape. Soon after the successful release, drummer Masaya left the band.

=== 1999–2002 ===
In 1999, Tyrant did not go on any tours because they had to look for a new drummer. They were unable to find ones whose drumming fitted the band's style. The band wave repeated over the band. In past days before the release of their debut, Damien of Ritual Carnage played for Tyrant as the rhythm guitarist. By the link, he invited him playing for Ritual Carnage. They had to look not only for the drummer, but also a guitarist. That problem was over just before the recording of their 2nd release. The addition of Yoshihiro on guitars, Masato on bass guitars, and Toshiya joined the band as the drummer. In February 2000, they signed with Dutch label Displeased Records. By the new members, they entered the studio to record their 2nd album entitled Legend in 2001. It was released from Displeased Records in the spring of 2002.

=== 2003–2005 ===
Tyrant released Grimores in 2005

== Members ==
=== Current ===
- Masato Date - Bass (1999–present)
- Ayumi Kubo - Keyboards (1995–present), Guitar (1995)
- Keisuke Kubo - Vocals (1994–present)
- Toshiya Nakamura - Drums (2005–present)
- Yoshihiro Yamaji - Guitar (2000–present)

=== Past ===
- Iwata - Guitars (1994–1995)
- Ryugo - Keyboards (1994–1995)
- Hidenori Tanaka - Guitars (1995–2000)
- Masaya - Drums (1996–1998)
- Damien - Bass (1996–1997)

== Discography ==
=== Studio albums ===
- Under the Dark Mystic Sky (1997)
- Legend (2002)
- Grimoires (2005)
