= Second Hand (band) =

British progressive rock band

- Also known as: The Next Collection, The Moving Finger, Chillum
- Origin: London, England
- Genres: Progressive rock, symphonic rock, art rock
- Years active: 1965–1972
- Labels: Polydor, Mushroom
- Past members: Nick South; Arthur Kitchener; Kieran O'Connor; Bob Gibbons; Ken Elliott; Rob Elliott; George Hart; Tony McGill

Second Hand were a British progressive rock band, established by teenagers Ken Elliott, Kieran O'Connor and Bob Gibbons in 1965. They recorded three studio albums (the first was released in 1968) until their breakup in 1972.

== History ==
=== Formation and early years (1965–1968) ===
Ken Elliott was 15 in 1965, when his schoolmate Kieran O'Connor, a drummer, suggested that they set up a band. Ken quickly learned to play the harmonica and the piano. Kieran also asked his friends Bob Gibbons, who played the guitar, and Grant Ramsay (bass) to join the group. The band's name was The Next Collection. The group was based in Streatham, South London. Ramsay was replaced by Arthur Kitchener soon afterwards. With him on board, the band won the Streatham ice rink battle of the bands and were awarded the privilege to make a demo recording at Maximum Sound Studios. The Next Collection recorded two songs during this session, "A Fairy Tale" and "Steam Tugs". These demo recordings were later released as bonus tracks to the 2007 reissue of the album Reality. Vic Keary, the owner of the studio, liked the band and decided to become their producer.

=== Polydor years (1968–1969) ===
With Keary's support, the band signed to the Polydor label under the name The Moving Finger (a reference to one of the Omar Khayyám poems). The band started working on their first studio album, Reality, with Arthur Kitchener on bass, but he quit the band during the sessions, and bassist Nick South was found through an ad in Melody Maker. Half of the songs on the album were recorded with Kitchener on the bass, and the other half with South.

The album was to be released in September, but Polydor found out that a band called The Moving Finger had already released a single on Mercury Records, so the band had to change its name. They called themselves Second Hand, as all their instruments had been bought used. (Due to an error caught later in production, early copies of Reality are credited to The Moving Finger on the record label.) The album was released at the end of 1968 in a packaging concept designed to make it look like a second-hand record, and received positive response in the music press, which would continue to treat the band favorably throughout their career. However, Reality was a commercial failure because of complete lack of promotional support by Polydor. Polydor also did not release a supporting single. All this became a reason for the band to leave the label.

=== Line-up changes and new experimental label (1969–1971) ===
The band's morale was low, and they embarked on a tour of Europe in 1969, hoping that something would change. However, the lifestyle and management prompted Bob Gibbons to leave the band during the tour, and pursue his guitar playing in the direction of jazz.

After several tours throughout Europe, Second Hand gained some popularity, especially in France. The lineup changed again: George Hart replaced Nick South on the bass, and Ken's brother Rob was engaged as a freestanding vocalist. They went on to record their second album, Death May Be Your Santa Claus, at Chalk Farm Studio in 1970. Vic Keary, who became the band's close friend, formed his own label called Mushroom and invited Second Hand to release their album on it. The album was released in April 1971 with a supporting single called "Funeral", featuring "Hangin' On An Eyelid" (a track from the LP) as the B-side. The album uses a heavy symphonic rock style obviously influenced by Arthur Brown's vocal manner (Rob Elliott was a big fan of him). The album was recorded without a guitarist. Moogy Mead, a session guitarist, was only involved in one song.

=== Chillum project (1971) ===
The band retired from touring. A young guitarist, Tony McGill, was invited to record the third album, but Rob Elliott left the band shortly after that. His departure called the entire project into question, but Keary persuaded the band to record the album just as it was planned originally. An experimental jam album was recorded in one day and released in late 1971. The band members decided to make "Chillum" both the artist name and the album title. The album went unnoticed, and Ken Elliott decided to disband Second Hand in early 1972.

=== Aftermath ===
Ken Elliott and Kieran O'Connor went on to play with the group Seventh Wave and released several albums. O'Connor died of alcoholism in 1991. Bob Gibbons died in 1977 due to "hypostatic and suppurative broncho-pneumonia" following a misdosage of prescribed medication, recorded by the coroner as misadventure.

Paul Stump wrote in his History of Progressive Rock: "Of all failed early Progressives, the opinion among latterday cognoscenti seems to indicate that Second Hand received the most unjust treatment from the music industry."

== Discography ==
Studio albums

- Reality (1968)
- Death May Be Your Santa Claus (1971)
- Chillum (1971) (as Chillum)

Singles

- "Funeral" / "Hangin' on an Eyelid" (Mushroom, 1972)
