= John Hinch (musician) =

English drummer (1947–2021)

- Born: 19 June 1947; Lichfield, Staffordshire, England
- Died: 29 April 2021 (aged 73)
- Instrument: Drums

John Frederick Hinch (19 June 1947 – 29 April 2021) was an English drummer from Lichfield, Staffordshire. From 1973 to 1975, he was the drummer in an early line-up of heavy metal band Judas Priest. Hinch was a jazz-rock styled drummer with a very compact style.

== Biography ==
Hinch played in several Birmingham rock bands, including the Pinch, the Generation, and the Bakerloo Blues Line, later Bakerloo. With vocalist Rob Halford he played in the band Hiroshima from 1972 to 1973.

In May 1973 guitarist K.K. Downing and bassist Ian Hill, the founding members of Judas Priest, were looking for other musicians to complete the line-up for their band, after vocalist Alan Atkins and various temporary drummers had left to pursue other musical projects. They approached Halford and Hinch after they saw them playing live with Hiroshima. Glenn Tipton later joined as second guitarist, establishing the first official line-up of Judas Priest, and in 1974 they recorded their first album, Rocka Rolla. Hinch was also the driver and the road manager of the band.

Hinch's drumming managed tempo and style changes from swing to jazz and rock, using a single bass drum. Hinch always used traditional jazz-rock drum kits with a snare drum, single bass drum, single tom-tom, and single floor tom, in contrast to his numerous successors who used big kits and equipment.

Differences and conflicts, particularly with Glenn Tipton, made Hinch leave: his place was taken by Alan "Skip" Moore (who previously played with the band during their "on the road" days). Hinch decided to pursue a career in musical management, working with Jameson Raid, Uli Jon Roth, Fashion, Steel, The Bureau, and Zeno.

In recent years he was contacted by several musical biographers and interviewers and spoke about Judas Priest, particularly in a 1995 interview included in The Best of Judas Priest – The Insight Series. Hinch can be seen in the video of the songs "Rocka Rolla" and "Dreamer Deceiver" (both from The Old Grey Whistle Test) in the collection Metal Works 1973–1993. He was among the members of the band who separately collaborated with author Neil Daniels for the release of the biography Judas Priest Defenders of the Faith.

Hinch was married from July 1987 to April 2010 to Jane Dayus (host of Wedding SOS). They had a son, Fraser, who is a self made entrepreneur with his own wedding production company.

Hinch died on 29 April 2021, after falling ill in London. Tributes included that paid by Halford, who stated, "His style was strong, direct and unique. I'll be blasting Rocka Rolla today!" KK Downing also paid tribute, saying, "John was always so dependable and did everything to the best of his ability, including his drumming which looking back can only be described as faultless."
