= Gull (record label) =

British record label

- Parent company: Gull Entertainments Ltd.
- Founded: 1974
- Defunct: 1984
- Genre: Rock music
- Country of origin: United Kingdom

Gull was a British record label founded in 1974. Owned by Gull Entertainments Ltd., it was associated with Morgan Sound Studio and was distributed by both Pye Records and Decca Records. It was also distributed by Motown in the US.

Its recording artists included Judas Priest, Arthur Brown, Steve Ashley, IF, Isotope, Nick Simper's Fandango, and Seventh Wave.

The label was disestablished in 1984.

In December 2025, it was announced that the catalogue of Gull had been acquired by Cherry Red Records. The deal included both master and publishing rights to the label’s releases, which date primarily from the 1970s and include early recordings by Judas Priest and other British rock and pop artists.
