= Battle cry (disambiguation) =

A battle cry is a yell or chant taken up in battle.

Battle Cry may also refer to:

== Music ==
- Battle Cry (Judas Priest album), 2016
- Battle Cry (Judas Priest video)
- Battle Cry (Omen album), 1984
- Battlecry (Two Steps from Hell album), 2015
- Battle Cry: Worship from the Frontlines, 2005 album by Christian singer Michael Gungor
- "Battle Cry" (Angel Haze song), 2014
- "Battle Cry" (Havana Brown song), 2015
- "Battle Cry" (Imagine Dragons song), 2014
- "Battle Cry" (Shontelle song), 2009
- "Battle Cry", a song from the 2006 Army of the Pharaohs album The Torture Papers
- "Battle Cry", a song from the 2002 Crazy Town album Darkhorse
- "Battle Cry", a song from the 2014 Judas Priest album Redeemer of Souls
- "Battle Cry", a song from the 2019 Polo G album Die a Legend
- "Battlecry", opening theme song of the anime Samurai Champloo

== Games ==
- Battle Cry (Avalon Hill game), a board game based on the American Civil War
- Battle Cry (Milton Bradley game), a 1961 board game
- BattleCry (video game), a cancelled video game
- BattleCry Studios, a video game developer
- Battlecry, a 1991 video game by Home Data
- Robotech: Battlecry, a 2002 video game
- Battle Cry (play-by-mail game), a fantasy play-by-mail wargame published in the late 1980s

== Other uses ==
- Battle Cry (film), a 1955 film starring Van Heflin, based on the Leon Uris novel
- Battlecry (racehorse), 16th-place finisher in the 2009 Grand National
- Battle Cry (Uris novel), published in 1953
- Battle Cry, a novel by American writer John Barnes
- Battle Cry Campaign, an initiative of the parachurch organization Teen Mania Ministries, primarily ministering to US teenagers

== See also ==
- Warcry (disambiguation)
