= Panic attack (disambiguation) =

A panic attack is an episode of intense fear and discomfort.

Panic attack may refer to:

- "Panic Attack" (The Paddingtons song), a song from the Paddington's 2005 album First Comes First
- "Panic Attack", a song from Dream Theater's 2005 album Octavarium
- "Panic Attack", a song from Halsey's 2024 album The Great Impersonator
- "Panic Attack!", a song from The Fall of Troy's 2009 album In the Unlikely Event
- "Panic Attack" (Judas Priest song), a song from Judas Priest's 2023 album Invincible Shield
- Panic Attack (EP), by Grinspoon
- Panic Attack (robot) from TV series Robot Wars
- Ataque de pánico! (Spanish for Panic Attack!), a 2009 science fiction short film about a robot attack on Montevideo, Uruguay
- Panic Attack!, a short film by Eileen O'Meara
