= Unholy Savior =

- Cover art by Claudio Bergamin

Studio album by Battle Beast
- Released: 9 January 2015
- Recorded: JKB Studios, Helsinki, Finland
- Genre: Heavy metal, power metal
- Length: 44:17
- Label: Nuclear Blast
- Producer: Anton Kabanen, Janne Björkroth

Battle Beast chronology
Battle Beast (2013)	Unholy Savior (2015)	Bringer of Pain (2017)

Unholy Savior is the third full-length album by the Finnish heavy metal band Battle Beast, released in January 2015.

== Track listing ==
All tracks are written by Anton Kabanen.

No.	Title	Length
1.	"Lionheart"	4:53
2.	"Unholy Savior"	5:36
3.	"I Want the World... and Everything in It"	4:37
4.	"Madness"	4:01
5.	"Sea of Dreams"	5:01
6.	"Speed and Danger"	4:38
7.	"Touch in the Night"	4:27
8.	"The Black Swordsman"	1:15
9.	"Hero's Quest"	2:30
10.	"Far Far Away"	3:46
11.	"Angel Cry"	3:33
Total length:		44:17

Bonus tracks
No.	Title	Length
12.	"Push It to the Limit" (Paul Engemann cover (taken from 1983's Scarface movie); bonus track for Japanese and limited editions)	3:19
13.	"Wild Child" (W.A.S.P. cover; bonus track for Japanese edition only)	5:11
Total length:		52:47

== Personnel ==
=== Battle Beast ===
- Noora Louhimo – lead vocals
- Anton Kabanen – lead guitar, backing vocals
- Juuso Soinio – rhythm guitar
- Eero Sipilä – bass, backing vocals
- Pyry Vikki – drums
- Janne Björkroth – keyboards, backing vocals

=== Additional musicians ===
- J-P Björkroth – flute on "Sea of Dreams"

=== Production ===
- Anton Kabanen – production
- Janne Björkroth – orchestration, co-production
- Matias Kupiainen – mixing at 5by5 Studios
- Mika Jussila – mastering at Finnvox Studios
