= Invincible Shield =

2024 studio album by Judas Priest

- Cover art by Mark Wilkinson

Studio album by Judas Priest
- Released: 6 March 2024
- Recorded: 2022 – May 2023
- Studios: The Southern Oracle, Eagleville TN; The Falcons Nest, Nashville TN; Premier Studios, Phoenix AZ
- Genres: Heavy metal, speed metal
- Length: 52:36
- Labels: Columbia; Epic (US)
- Producer: Andy Sneap

Judas Priest chronology
Firepower (2018)	Invincible Shield (2024)

Singles from Invincible Shield
- 1. "Panic Attack" Released: 13 October 2023; 2. "Trial by Fire" Released: 17 November 2023; 3. "Crown of Horns" Released: 19 January 2024; 4. "The Serpent and the King" Released: 22 February 2024

Invincible Shield is the nineteenth studio album by English heavy metal band Judas Priest, released on 6 March 2024 by Sony in Japan, and globally two days later through Columbia and Epic Records. It was produced by the band's touring guitarist Andy Sneap, who also produced 2018's Firepower, while the album's last two tracks ("Sons of Thunder" and "Giants in the Sky") were co-produced by Tom Allom. It is Judas Priest's final album to feature longtime bassist Ian Hill, who retired in October 2026.

The album debuted at number two on the UK Albums Chart, the highest position in the band's discography to date. In the US, it debuted at number 18 on the Billboard 200 and topped the spot for the Billboard Top Hard Rock Albums chart, earning 25,000 album-equivalent units in its first week.

== Background and recording ==
In February 2020, the band officially began writing sessions for their 19th album, but as guitarist Richie Faulkner stated later, they "faced some challenges with schedules due to the pandemic" and had not been able to get together and work on new music: "We wanted to keep it the same dynamic as Firepower – as we all got together, played the songs in pre-production before recording them".

In September 2021, after the pandemic restrictions were lifted the band started their 50 Heavy Metal Years world tour. "So the next obstacle, if you wanna call it that, was the tour. We had to go out and tour and record bits and pieces in between the tour legs." Due to ongoing restrictions, the album was recorded in various places: Scott Travis and Richie Faulkner in Nashville, Tennessee (where they reside), Rob Halford in Phoenix, Arizona, and Ian Hill while on tour in various European cities.

In March 2022, Faulkner revealed that the drums for the new record had already been recorded and emphasized that the songs "are a bit more progressive in places" having a few twists and turns musically that Firepower does not have. To avoid misunderstandings Faulkner stated later that the album will not be a musical continuation of the experimental Nostradamus or progressive in a Rush-like interpretation, but "instead of verse, chorus, verse, chorus, solo, chorus, finish, sometimes it goes off and plays it a little... like the old '70s Judas Priest used to, like the 'Sinner' and stuff like that".

In May 2023, after Rob Halford laid down his parts in the studio in Phoenix, Arizona with producer and touring guitarist Andy Sneap, the band stated they had finished tracking and the album had moved on to the mixing and mastering stage. The songs "Sons of Thunder" and "Escape from Reality" were written by Glenn Tipton, and he performed guitar solos on both "Sons of Thunder" and "Vicious Circle." The bonus track "The Lodger" was written by Bob Halligan Jr., who has written other songs for the band, most notably "Some Heads Are Gonna Roll".

The album was announced on 7 October 2023 before the band's performance at the first Power Trip festival in Indio, California. The album trailer was then uploaded on the band's YouTube channel containing the intro of "Panic Attack".

The first single, "Panic Attack", was released on 13 October 2023, followed by "Trial by Fire" on 17 November, "Crown of Horns" on 19 January 2024 and "The Serpent and the King" on 22 February. The band embarked on a world tour one month after the album's release.

Invincible Shield debuted at number 18, on the Billboard 200, selling 25,000 copies in its first week in the US. It also debuted at number two on the UK albums chart and reached number one in six countries. Judas Priest embarked on a North American tour in the Spring of 2024, in support of the album.

== Reception ==
Professional ratings
Aggregate scores
Source	Rating
AnyDecentMusic?	7.4/10
Metacritic	80/100
Review scores
Source	Rating
AllMusic	4/5 stars
Classic Rock	4/5 stars
Kerrang!	4/5
Record Collector	4/5 stars
Metal Hammer	4.5/5 stars
Blabbermouth.net	9/10
Sputnikmusic	4.3/5.0
musicOMH	4/5 stars
The List	4/5 stars
laut.de	4/5 stars

Invincible Shield received generally favourable reviews from music critics. On Metacritic, which assigns a normalized rating out of 100 to reviews from mainstream critics, the album has an average score of 80, indicating “generally favorable reviews”. At AnyDecentMusic?, which collates critical reviews from more than 50 media sources, the album scored 7.4 out of 10.

Philip Wilding of Louder Sound described the album as “pristine and powerful”, while Sam Law of Kerrang! praised it with a 4 out of 5 stars rating, highlighting its powerful riffs and dynamic vocals. Blabbermouth.net’s Dom Lawson gave it a high score of 9/10, commending the band’s ability to stay relevant and deliver a fresh yet classic heavy metal sound. Sputnikmusic rated it 4.3/5.0, noting the album’s strong songwriting and production quality.

Rich Hobson of Louder Sound remarked that “Fifty years on from their tentative first steps, Priest have produced what may well be the most defiantly, unrelentingly triumphant record of their career”.

=== Year-end lists ===
Select year-end rankings for Invincible Shield
Publication/critic	Accolade	Rank	Ref.
Bravewords	Top 30 Albums of 2024	1	
Consequence	Top 30 Best Hard Rock / Metal Albums of 2024	2	
Decibel	Top 40 Albums of 2024	4	
Loudwire	The 11 Best Metal Albums of 2024	2	
Metal Hammer	Top 50 Albums of 2024	2	
Metal Storm	Top 20 Albums of 2024	3	
Rolling Stone	Top 20 Metal Albums of 2024	7	
Ultimate Guitar	Top 20 Albums of 2024	1	

== Awards ==
At the 2024 German Metal Hammer Awards ceremony that was held on August 31 of that year, Invincible Shield won the award for Best Album.

It also won the 2024 Metal Storm Award for Best Heavy/Traditional Metal Album and the 2024 Metal Pilgrim Best Metal Album award in both popular and expert votes.

"Crown of Horns" was also nominated for Best Metal Performance at the 67th Annual Grammy Awards.

== Track listing ==
All songs written by Glenn Tipton, Richie Faulkner and Rob Halford except "The Lodger" by Bob Halligan Jr.

Invincible Shield standard track listing
No.	Title	Length
1.	"Panic Attack"	5:25
2.	"The Serpent and the King"	4:19
3.	"Invincible Shield"	6:21
4.	"Devil in Disguise"	4:46
5.	"Gates of Hell"	4:38
6.	"Crown of Horns"	5:45
7.	"As God Is My Witness"	4:36
8.	"Trial by Fire"	4:21
9.	"Escape from Reality"	4:24
10.	"Sons of Thunder"	2:58
11.	"Giants in the Sky"	5:03
Total length:		52:36

Deluxe edition / 7" bonus tracks
No.	Title	Length
12.	"Fight of Your Life"	4:19
13.	"Vicious Circle"	3:01
14.	"The Lodger"	3:52
Total length:		63:48

The three bonus tracks on the deluxe edition were also released on a bonus 7" EP sold separately and included in promotional bundles.

== Personnel ==
Personnel taken from Invincible Shield liner notes.

Judas Priest

- Rob Halford – vocals
- Glenn Tipton – guitars
- Richie Faulkner – guitars
- Ian Hill – bass guitar
- Scott Travis – drums

Additional personnel

- Andy Sneap – production, engineering, mixing
- Tom Allom – co–production on "Sons of Thunder" and "Giants in the Sky"
- Mark Gittins – Atmos surround mixing
- Mark Wilkinson – cover art

== Charts ==
=== Weekly charts ===
Weekly chart performance for Invincible Shield
Chart (2024)	Peak position
Australian Albums (ARIA)	16
Austrian Albums (Ö3 Austria)	1
Belgian Albums (Ultratop Flanders)	3
Belgian Albums (Ultratop Wallonia)	5
Canadian Albums (Billboard)	16
Croatian International Albums (HDU)	1
Czech Albums (ČNS IFPI)	6
Danish Albums (Hitlisten)	15
Dutch Albums (Album Top 100)	5
Finnish Albums (Suomen virallinen lista)	1
French Albums (SNEP)	5
Greek Albums (IFPI)	2
German Albums (Offizielle Top 100)	1
Hungarian Albums (MAHASZ)	8
Irish Albums (Official Charts)	18
Italian Albums (FIMI)	8
Japanese Albums (Oricon)	7
Japanese Digital Albums (Oricon)	6
Japanese Hot Albums (Billboard Japan)	6
New Zealand Albums (RMNZ)	25
Norwegian Albums (VG-lista)	14
Polish Albums (ZPAV)	2
Portuguese Albums (AFP)	8
Scottish Albums (Official Charts)	1
Spanish Albums (Promusicae)	3
Swedish Albums (Sverigetopplistan)	1
Swiss Albums (Schweizer Hitparade)	1
UK Albums (Official Charts)	2
UK Rock & Metal Albums (Official Charts)	1
US Billboard 200	18
US Top Hard Rock Albums (Billboard)	1
US Top Rock Albums (Billboard)	4

=== Year-end charts ===
Year-end chart performance for Invincible Shield
Chart (2024)	Position
Austrian Albums (Ö3 Austria)	51
German Albums (Offizielle Top 100)	33
Swiss Albums (Schweizer Hitparade)	50

== Release history ==
Release formats for Invincible Shield
Region	Date	Label	Format	Catalogue
Japan	6 March 2024	SMEJ	LP; CD; cassette	SICP-31698
North America	8 March 2024	Epic	LP; CD; cassette	1 96588 51642 9
Various	8 March 2024	Columbia	LP; CD; cassette	1 96588 51642 9
