= Battle Beast (album) =

- Cover art by Claudio Bergamin

Studio album by Battle Beast
- Released: 17 May 2013
- Recorded: 2012, JKB Studios, Helsinki, Finland
- Genre: Heavy metal, power metal
- Length: 48:13 (without bonus track); 51:58 (with bonus track)
- Label: WEA Finland, Nuclear Blast
- Producer: Anton Kabanen, Janne Björkroth

Battle Beast chronology
| Steel (2011) | Battle Beast (2013) | Unholy Savior (2015) |

Battle Beast is the second full-length album by the Finnish heavy metal band Battle Beast, released in May 2013. It peaked at No. 5 on the Finnish Albums Chart.

== Track listing ==
All tracks are written by Anton Kabanen.

| No. | Title | Length |
|---|---|---|
| 1. | "Let It Roar" | 3:41 |
| 2. | "Out of Control" | 3:48 |
| 3. | "Out on the Streets" | 2:54 |
| 4. | "Neuromancer" | 4:00 |
| 5. | "Raven" | 2:57 |
| 6. | "Into the Heart of Danger" | 5:29 |
| 7. | "Machine Revolution" | 4:01 |
| 8. | "Golden Age" | 1:59 |
| 9. | "Kingdom" | 5:05 |
| 10. | "Over the Top" | 2:39 |
| 11. | "Fight, Kill, Die" | 2:43 |
| 12. | "Black Ninja" | 3:50 |
| 13. | "Rain Man" | 5:10 |
| Total length: | | 48:27 |

German edition bonus track
| No. | Title | Length |
|---|---|---|
| 14. | "Shutdown" | 3:42 |
| Total length: | | 51:59 |

== Literary references ==
As with Steel, several songs on Battle Beast reference the dark fantasy manga Berserk by Kentaro Miura: "Out of Control", "Golden Age", "Kingdom", and "Fight, Kill, Die". "Neuromancer", meanwhile, is about the William Gibson cyberpunk novel of same name.

== Personnel ==
=== Battle Beast ===
- Noora Louhimo – lead vocals
- Anton Kabanen – lead guitar, backing vocals (co-lead vocals on tracks 1, 5 and 13)
- Juuso Soinio – rhythm guitar
- Eero Sipilä – bass, backing vocals
- Janne Björkroth – keyboards, backing vocals
- Pyry Vikki – drums

=== Additional musicians ===
- Joonas Kaikko – percussion

=== Production ===
- Anton Kabanen – production, engineering, mixing
- Janne Björkroth – orchestration, co-production, engineering, mixing
- Lucas Lönnross – engineering
- Mika Jussila – mastering at Finnvox Studios
