= Epitaph (video) =

Video by Judas Priest
- Released: 28 May 2013
- Recorded: 26 May 2012
- Venue: Hammersmith Apollo (London, United Kingdom)
- Genre: Heavy metal
- Length: 2:19:37
- Label: Legacy

Judas Priest chronology
Live Vengeance '82 (2006)	Epitaph (2013)	Battle Cry (2016)

Professional ratings
Review scores
Source	Rating
Ultimate-Guitar	8.6/10 stars
Metalholic	9.4/10 stars
MetalTalk	5/5 stars

Epitaph is a live video released by Judas Priest on DVD and Blu-Ray on 28 May 2013. It was filmed at the Hammersmith Apollo on 26 May 2012, which was the last date of the Epitaph World Tour, where they performed songs from each Halford-era album from Rocka Rolla to Nostradamus. The show was first seen in cinemas in New York City on 14 May and in London on 15 May with special screenings around the world on 16 May. It then premiered on VH1 Classic in the United States on 25 May.

== Track listing ==
All lyrics are written by Rob Halford, Glenn Tipton and K.K. Downing except where noted.

No.	Title	Writer(s)	Original album	Length
1.	"Battle Hymn / Rapid Fire"		Painkiller & British Steel	5:25
2.	"Metal Gods"		British Steel	4:36
3.	"Heading Out to the Highway"		Point of Entry	4:53
4.	"Judas Rising"		Angel of Retribution	4:59
5.	"Starbreaker"		Sin After Sin	4:31
6.	"Victim of Changes"	Al Atkins, Halford, Tipton, Downing	Sad Wings of Destiny	11:28
7.	"Never Satisfied"	Atkins, Downing	Rocka Rolla	6:15
8.	"Diamonds & Rust" (Joan Baez cover)	Joan Baez	Sin After Sin	4:57
9.	"Dawn of Creation / Prophecy"		Nostradamus	6:14
10.	"Night Crawler"		Painkiller	6:37
11.	"Turbo Lover"		Turbo	7:00
12.	"Beyond the Realms of Death"	Halford, Les Binks	Stained Class	7:37
13.	"The Sentinel"		Defenders of the Faith	6:02
14.	"Blood Red Skies"		Ram It Down	8:43
15.	"The Green Manalishi (With the Two Prong Crown)" (Fleetwood Mac cover)	Peter Green	Hell Bent for Leather	4:38
16.	"Breaking the Law"		British Steel	2:36
17.	"Painkiller"		Painkiller	8:58
18.	"The Hellion / Electric Eye"		Screaming for Vengeance	5:22
19.	"Hell Bent for Leather"	Tipton	Hell Bent for Leather	9:15
20.	"You've Got Another Thing Comin'"		Screaming for Vengeance	12:54
21.	"Living After Midnight"		British Steel	6:37

== Reception ==
The DVD received critical acclaim. Ultimate Guitar gave a positive review saying, "It shows the entire band continuing to defy the laws of nature and rationality, as they dominate the stage with ever increasing power and passion that any fan will sit back in amazement at." Rustyn Rose of Metalholic said, "Epitaph is a must own DVD for any metal fan, and especially for the Judas Priest faithful." Johnny Churchill of Metaltalk.net talked about the cinema version, "Watching the DVD in a cinema is great fun and if you get the chance at home, then draw the curtains, crank up your TV to 11, sit back for two hours with a beer and just enjoy."

== Charts ==
Chart (2013)	Peak position
Dutch Albums (Album Top 100)	23
German Albums (Offizielle Top 100)	41
Hungarian Albums (MAHASZ)	20
Swiss Albums (Schweizer Hitparade)	23

== Personnel ==
- Rob Halford – Vocals
- Glenn Tipton – Guitar, Vocals
- Richie Faulkner – Guitar, Vocals
- Ian Hill – Bass
- Scott Travis – Drums

== Production ==
- Tom Allom - Producer, Mixing, Mastering
- Richard Kayvan - Producer, Mixing, Mastering
- Mark Wilkinson - Artwork
- Joe Lester - Photography
- Alex Walker - Producer, Directing, Editing
- Eric Lehner - Director of Photography
- Jayne Andrews - Executive Producer
