= Firepower (album) =

- Cover art by Claudio Bergamin

Studio album by Judas Priest
- Released: 9 March 2018
- Recorded: March–June 2017, Worcestershire, England
- Genres: Heavy metal, speed metal
- Length: 58:10
- Labels: Epic (US); Columbia (rest of world)
- Producers: Tom Allom and Andy Sneap

Judas Priest chronology
Redeemer of Souls (2014)	Firepower (2018)	Invincible Shield (2024)

Singles from Firepower
- 1. "Lightning Strike" Released: 5 January 2018; 2. "Firepower" Released: 14 February 2018; 3. "Never the Heroes" Released: 2 March 2018

Firepower is the eighteenth studio album by English heavy metal band Judas Priest. Released in 2018, it was the band's first studio album since 1988's Ram It Down to be produced by Tom Allom and the first one with Andy Sneap as co-producer. The album sold around 49,000 copies in the United States within its first week of release, debuting at No. 5 on the Billboard 200 chart, making it the band's highest-charting album in the US. The album also reached No. 5 in the UK, making it their first top-ten album in the UK since British Steel. Music videos were made for "Lightning Strike", "Spectre" and "No Surrender". A lyric video was made for "Never the Heroes". The record also produced three singles.

== Background ==
In an interview with Reverb.com in November 2015, Richie Faulkner said that Judas Priest would start work on a new album in 2016. In April 2016, Loudwire posted a photo showing Rob Halford, Glenn Tipton and Faulkner himself in the studio, with Halford stating in a radio interview that the album would arrive by early 2017. Halford expressed dissatisfaction on making an album similar to the previous album Redeemer of Souls. The band entered the studio in March 2017 to begin recording the album, recruiting Allom and Sneap to produce it, which concluded in June 2017.

== Band appraisal ==
Halford describes Firepower as "some of our best work — without a doubt", praising Faulkner for his contributions.

Drummer Scott Travis says that it was "a little bit of both" of a conscious effort to revisit some of the band's musical past organically and naturally, expressing uncertainty in terms of the writings of the guitar riffs. He cites the songs "Rising from Ruins", "Lone Wolf", "Evil Never Dies" and "Never the Heroes" as his favourites. Travis says that "Never the Heroes" is "a great, meaningful song in the sense just lyrically, even though I had nothing to do with the lyrics, but it's a great song [with] a great hook." The album has "a lot of ebbs and flows and, hopefully, it has some movement to it where the first song doesn't like the fifth song sounds like the eighth song. Hopefully there's some different sounds and just vibes that people are gonna get when they listen to it." The production is described as an improvement over Redeemer of Souls.

Both Faulkner and Travis agree that Firepower is a heavier album than Redeemer of Souls, with Faulkner saying that the title track "might be the fastest Priest song. Especially in terms of the drum approach. A friend of mine, he said it sounds like 'Painkiller', but faster. So I can't think of another song that's quicker than 'Painkiller'. So if you define heavy in terms of speed, it's a pretty heavy track, it's pretty full-on."

Halford describes the album's title as "the fire and the power of heavy metal music", mentioning the band's other titles such as Screaming for Vengeance, Defenders of the Faith, British Steel and Sad Wings of Destiny, "They all sound great, don't they? They got to have some strength and conviction in the statement that Firepower certainly does." He also expressed satisfaction on his overall vocal performance on the album, describing it being "something I can listen to now without self-criticism. It doesn't matter how many records you've made, there's always a new experience you can get with a new producer. We've always made that perfectly clear; we know the value of recording with an outside producer. On Firepower, I was encouraged, coached, and captured."

Halford said that the band's desire to create the sound of Firepower was to "re-invent some of the classic moments of Priest, which we could trace to the length and breadth of our roots if you think about it with albums like Sad Wings of Destiny, Screaming For Vengeance, Painkiller, British Steel, Sin After Sin, Killing Machine... it just goes on and on (laughs), but internally we knew what that meant so that was the focus". He describes the album being "an incredible moment, not just for Priest, but for heavy metal", and that its success "shows you don't have much control over the music." Halford thanked the production staff for their work and expressed his gratitude towards the fans for its achievement.

== Writing and recording ==
Faulkner described the songwriting process as "free and really relaxed", and that the writing and recording ideas from Redeemer of Souls remained the same, but was slightly different in terms of his guitar performance. He also says that it wasn't a conscious thing on his part to revisit the band's classic albums for inspiration. Faulkner explains that some of the melodies and the ideas for Firepower were already written a long time ago. He cites the songs "Rising From Ruins", "Evil Never Dies" and "Sea of Red" as his favourites. When Allom and Sneap were selected to produce the album, Faulkner explained that it was "one of those lightbulb-moments, because it was never been done before with Priest but it just worked out great. It could have gone horribly wrong with clashing egos and things like that, but it was a great marriage of a classic producer and a more modern producer. They were really instrumental in getting the sound and the energy right for Firepower and I think that they did a fantastic job."

The album would be released in the same year as the 100th anniversary of the end of World War 1, a fact commemorated in the song Sea of Red.

When recording the album, Faulkner used a white Gibson Les Paul that he had used on prior Judas Priest tours for distorted rhythm parts. He used a combination of amplifiers, including a Marshall JCM800 and EVH 5150. For clean passages, he used a Fender Telecaster through a Roland JC-120. Glenn Tipton recorded the album primarily his signature ESP Viper and his old custom Hamer models, as well as a variety of Stratocasters. For amplification, he primarily used an Engl Invader but also experimented with EVHs and Marshalls. He improvised his leads on the album while Faulkner both improvised and composed his leads.

Shortly after Tipton announced that he was diagnosed with Parkinson's disease on 12 February 2018, former guitarist K. K. Downing insinuated that Sneap's contributions on Firepower were more than being just a producer, given the idea that Sneap covered Tipton's guitar parts and not Tipton himself. Halford and Faulkner responded negatively. Downing later clarified that he only meant to say that Sneap not only produced, but likely "contributed song ideas, riffs and licks, lyric ideas etc."

Halford says that technology did not change the writing process. He also said that the band did not listen to their classic albums for inspiration during production, "but we certainly thought about what was at the core of all those records, at the metal heart of Priest. That's what gave us the direction for Firepower."

== Reception ==
Professional ratings
Aggregate scores
Source	Rating
AnyDecentMusic?	7.1/10
Metacritic	77/100
Review scores
Source	Rating
AllMusic	4/5 stars
Blabbermouth.net	9/10
Classic Rock	4/5 stars
Clash	8/10
Exclaim!	5/10
The Guardian	4/5 stars
Metal Hammer	9/10
Metal Storm	8.3/10
PopMatters	7/10
Record Collector	4/5 stars

Firepower received generally positive reviews from music critics. At Metacritic, which assigns a normalised rating out of 100 to reviews from mainstream critics, the album has an average score of 77 based on 11 reviews, indicating "generally favourable reviews". At AnyDecentMusic?, that collates critical reviews from more than 50 media sources, the album scored 7.1 points out of 10, based on 10 reviews. The album made several publications' lists of best albums and top metal albums of 2018.

William Nesbitt of PopMatters wrote, "Firepower welcomes fans of previous Priest records, but it also sounds modern. That's not surprising given that the band used two producers for the album... It's not the nuclear assault of Painkiller, a touchstone for many Priest fans, or the late-day resurrection of Redeemer of Souls, but Firepower proves Judas Priest still pack some heavy artillery and can still hit the target even if not every shot is a bullseye." Rich Davenport of Record Collector noted, "'Flamethrower' is a weaker moment, somewhat generic in parts, but the overall quality of writing and performance stays high, from Rob Halford's commanding range and presence to the agile Tipton/ Faulkner guitar team's riffing and lead work, the whole band sounding like they've still got something to prove." Josh Gray of Clash stated, "...as far as I can tell, Judas Priest just woke up one morning and suddenly remembered how to be the greatest heavy metal band on the planet again. Though it is far too early to start talking about this as one of their finest records, I have no doubt that Firepower could slip through a wormhole in time to stand in the mighty presence of British Steel and Screaming For Vengeance and feel no shame. Thom Jurek of AllMusic added "Closing in on their 50th anniversary, Judas Priest still possess the musical rigor, showmanship, and force that make other bands bow down. Firepower smokes." Michael Hann of The Guardian wrote "Firepower's success depends on the songwriting, though, and that's pretty strong... Of course, Firepower could never sound as revolutionary as Priest did when they were codifying metal 40 years ago, but it's often excellent."

In December 2017, Firepower was listed by Ultimate Guitar as one of the "Top 25 Most Anticipated Albums of 2018", alongside expected albums by bands like A Perfect Circle, Megadeth, Testament, Alice in Chains, Guns N' Roses, Muse and The Offspring.

=== Accolades ===
Year-end rankings for Firepower
Publication	Accolade	Rank
Decibel	Decibel's Top 40 Albums of 2018	5
Loudwire	The 30 Best Metal Albums of 2018	3
Revolver	30 Best Metal Albums of 2018	4
Rolling Stone	20 Best Metal Albums of 2018	3
WJCU	Top 25 Albums of 2018	1

Decade-end rankings for Firepower
Publication	Accolade	Rank
Consequence	Top 25 Metal Albums of the 2010s	14
Discogs	The 200 Best Albums of the 2010s	180
Louder Sound	The 50 Best Metal Albums of the 2010s	11
Louder Sound	The 50 Best Rock Albums of the 2010s	10
Loudwire	The 66 Best Metal Albums of the Decade	18
Metalsucks	The 25 Best Metal Albums of 2010 – 2019	13
Revolver	25 Best Albums of the 2010s	6

=== Awards ===
Awards for Firepower
Year	Ceremony	Category	Result	Ref.
2019	Metal Storm Awards	Biggest Surprise	Won	
2019	Planet Rock Awards	Best British Album	Won	

== Track listing ==
All tracks are written by Glenn Tipton, Rob Halford and Richie Faulkner.

Firepower track listing
No.	Title	Length
1.	"Firepower"	3:27
2.	"Lightning Strike"	3:29
3.	"Evil Never Dies"	4:23
4.	"Never the Heroes"	4:23
5.	"Necromancer"	3:33
6.	"Children of the Sun"	4:00
7.	"Guardians" (instrumental)	1:06
8.	"Rising from Ruins"	5:23
9.	"Flame Thrower"	4:34
10.	"Spectre"	4:24
11.	"Traitors Gate"	5:43
12.	"No Surrender"	2:54
13.	"Lone Wolf"	5:09
14.	"Sea of Red"	5:51
Total length:		58:10

The tour edition boxed set contains a 7" vinyl; it is limited only to Germany, Austria and Switzerland.

Side A
No.	Title	Length
1.	"Lightning Strike"	3:29

Side B
No.	Title	Length
2.	"Living After Midnight" (live; recorded on 1 August 2015 at Wacken Open Air)	5:45

== Personnel ==
Credits adapted from the liner notes of Firepower.

Judas Priest

- Rob Halford – vocals
- Glenn Tipton – guitars
- Richie Faulkner – guitars
- Ian Hill – bass guitar
- Scott Travis – drums

Artwork

- Claudio Bergamin – front cover art
- Mark Wilkinson – album design and additional illustrations

Production

- Tom Allom – production
- Andy Sneap – production, engineering, mixing, mastering at Backstage Recording Studios, Derbyshire, England
- Mike Exeter – engineering

== Charts ==
=== Weekly charts ===
Weekly chart performance for Firepower
Chart (2018)	Peak position
Australian Albums (ARIA)	12
Austrian Albums (Ö3 Austria)	2
Belgian Albums (Ultratop Flanders)	5
Belgian Albums (Ultratop Wallonia)	14
Canadian Albums (Billboard)	3
Croatian International Albums (HDU)	3
Czech Albums (ČNS IFPI)	1
Danish Albums (Hitlisten)	19
Dutch Albums (Album Top 100)	16
Finnish Albums (Suomen virallinen lista)	2
French Albums (SNEP)	30
German Albums (Offizielle Top 100)	2
Greek Albums (IFPI)	4
Hungarian Albums (MAHASZ)	2
Irish Albums (IRMA)	52
Italian Albums (FIMI)	20
Japan Hot Albums (Billboard Japan)	12
Japanese Albums (Oricon)	9
New Zealand Albums (RMNZ)	36
Norwegian Albums (VG-lista)	5
Polish Albums (ZPAV)	5
Portuguese Albums (AFP)	3
Scottish Albums (Official Charts)	4
Spanish Albums (Promusicae)	6
Swedish Albums (Sverigetopplistan)	1
Swiss Albums (Schweizer Hitparade)	3
UK Albums (Official Charts)	5
UK Rock & Metal Albums (Official Charts)	1
US Billboard 200	5
US Top Hard Rock Albums (Billboard)	1
US Top Rock Albums (Billboard)	2

=== Year-end charts ===
Year-end chart performance for Firepower
Chart (2018)	Position
Austrian Albums (Ö3 Austria)	61
Belgian Albums (Ultratop Flanders)	119
German Albums (Offizielle Top 100)	29
Swiss Albums (Schweizer Hitparade)	49
Spanish Albums (PROMUSICAE)	70
US Top Hard Rock Albums (Billboard)	33
US Top Rock Albums (Billboard)	77

== Certifications ==
Region	Certification	Certified units/sales
Germany (BVMI)	Gold	100,000^{‡}
Poland (ZPAV)	Gold	10,000^{‡}
^{‡} Sales+streaming figures based on certification alone.
