= Panic Attack (Judas Priest song) =

Single by Judas Priest

from the album Invincible Shield
- Released: October 13, 2023
- Recorded: 2022 – May 2023
- Genre: Heavy metal; power metal
- Length: 5:25
- Label: Columbia; Epic (US)
- Songwriters: Rob Halford; Richie Faulkner; Glenn Tipton
- Producer: Andy Sneap

Judas Priest singles chronology
"Never the Heroes" (2018)	"Panic Attack" (2023)	"Trial by Fire" (2023)

Music video
- "Panic Attack" on YouTube

"Panic Attack" is a song by the English heavy metal band Judas Priest from their 2024 album Invincible Shield. It was released as the album's lead single on October 13, 2023, and became its most popular song, having over 8 million Spotify listens and 2 million YouTube views.

== Overview ==
"Panic Attack" opens with a mix of guitars and synths, before transitioning into the main riff. The song's opening has been compared to the style of Judas Priest's 1986 album Turbo, while the rest of the song takes influence from their 1990 album Painkiller.

The song was seen as unusually dark for the band lyrically, with Halford noting it offers a dark view of the power of the internet. “When I say, 'The clamor and the clatter of incensed keys can bring a nation to its knees', we see that all the time,” he said. “The primaries are going on, and the internet is full of conspiracy theories, hate, bullying—all of that kind of stuff.”

== Reception ==
Forbes writer Quentin Singer praised the song, stating it "is as good as it gets" and that "it’s astounding just how good Priest sound on “Panic Attack.” Guitarist Richie Faulkner continues to prove himself a masterful metal guitar player and perfect fit for the band, while the chops and abilities of the band's original members sound like they haven't aged a day since 1990's".

Teeth of the Divine writer Frank Rini described the song as "pure heavy metal" and states that "Rob Halford, sounds possessed with his vocals and Scott Travis continues to make a believer out of us all as to why he is still one of the greatest metal drummers of all time. Ian Hill’s bass is audible and serviceable as well." Rini also mentions that "the speeding thrashing attack towards the end of the song with the chorus then back to the mid-paced and soloing is outstanding."

== Personnel ==
Judas Priest

- Rob Halford – vocals
- Glenn Tipton – guitars
- Richie Faulkner – guitars
- Ian Hill – bass guitar
- Scott Travis – drums

Additional personnel

- Andy Sneap – production, engineering, mixing
- Mark Gittins – Atmos surround mixing
