= No More Hollywood Endings =

Studio album by Battle Beast
- Released: 22 March 2019
- Studio: JKB Studios
- Genre: Heavy metal, power metal
- Length: 53:21
- Label: Nuclear Blast
- Producer: Janne Björkroth

Battle Beast chronology
Bringer of Pain (2017)	No More Hollywood Endings (2019)	Circus of Doom (2022)

Professional ratings
Review scores
Source	Rating
Blabbermouth	8/10
Metal Gods TV	9/10
Sonic Perspectives	8.1/10
Angry Metal Guy	2.5/5.0
Distorted Sound Magazine	8/10

No More Hollywood Endings is the fifth full-length album by the Finnish heavy metal band Battle Beast, released on 22 March 2019. To promote the album, they produced three music videos for the album; "Eden", "Endless Summer", and the title track "No More Hollywood Endings."

== Reception ==
Reception of the album has been generally positive with critics and mixed with fans. Steel Druhm of Angry Metal Guy stated that it's "roughly half an album of worthwhile cuts to poach, but compared to their last outing, the high points aren't as high, and the lows are deeper and more treacherous." Jonathan Smith from Sonic Perspectives was very positive in comparison, saying that the majority of the songs on the album prove to be "hits rather than misses". Though they did make mention of the fact that "the post-Kabanen incarnation of Battle Beast had been a shell of its former self, though it continued to be a fairly impressive shell relative to what often befell earlier bands when the power behind the voice vacated the premises." Elliot Leaver of Distorted Sound Magazine stated how "No More Hollywood Endings is a real statement of intent from the Finns. After losing their main creative drive, Anton Kabanen, any worries fans had of his departure causing irreparable damage have continued to prove unfounded."

Upon its release, the album went straight to no. 1 on the official Finnish list, and remained in the top 50 for a total of seven weeks.

== Track listing ==
No.	Title	Length
1.	"Unbroken"	4:08
2.	"No More Hollywood Endings"	3:54
3.	"Eden"	4:00
4.	"Unfairy Tales"	3:33
5.	"Endless Summer"	3:37
6.	"The Hero"	4:13
7.	"Piece of Me"	3:39
8.	"I Wish"	4:26
9.	"Raise Your Fists"	6:10
10.	"The Golden Horde"	3:58
11.	"World on Fire"	4:03
12.	"Bent and Broken"	3:50
13.	"My Last Dream"	3:50
Total length:		53:21

== Personnel ==
=== Battle Beast ===
- Noora Louhimo – lead vocals
- Joona Björkroth – lead guitar
- Juuso Soinio – rhythm guitar
- Eero Sipilä – bass, backing vocals
- Pyry Vikki – drums
- Janne Björkroth – keyboards

=== Additional musicians ===
- Mikaela Palmu – violin
- Marjukka Kettunen – violin
- Sari Deshayes – violin
- Anna Tanskanen – violin
- Petteri Poijärvi – viola
- Johan Carlsson – cello
- Juuso Björkroth – clarinet
- JP Björkroth – flute
