= Redeemer of Souls =

- Cover art by Mark Wilkinson

Studio album by Judas Priest
- Released: 8 July 2014
- Recorded: 2013–2014
- Genre: Heavy metal
- Length: 61:58
- Labels: Columbia; Epic (US)
- Producers: Mike Exeter and Glenn Tipton

Judas Priest chronology
Nostradamus (2008)	Redeemer of Souls (2014)	Firepower (2018)

Singles from Redeemer of Souls
- 1. "Redeemer of Souls" Released: 28 April 2014; 2. "March of the Damned" Released: 19 May 2014; 3. "Dragonaut" Released: 13 June 2014

Redeemer of Souls is the seventeenth studio album by English heavy metal band Judas Priest, which was released in the US on 8 July 2014, in Europe on 11 July, and in the UK on 14 July. It is their first album without founding guitarist K. K. Downing, who quit the band in 2011 and was replaced by new guitarist Richie Faulkner. It also marks the band's last album to be produced by Glenn Tipton. The album sold around 32,000 copies in the United States in its first week of release to peak at No. 6 on the Billboard 200 chart, marking the band's first top 10 album debut in the US. It has sold 110,000 copies in the US as of February 2016.

== Background ==
On 27 January 2011, Judas Priest announced that they were in the process of writing new material for what was thought to be the group's final album due to their previously announced farewell tour entitled the Epitaph World Tour, but the band clarified that the Epitaph tour was "by no means the end of the band." Speaking at a press conference in Los Angeles on 26 May, of the new material, Glenn Tipton said, "It's quite a mixed bag. Really, there's more sentiment on this album. In a way, I suppose, it's also our farewell album, although it might not be our last one. There are some anthems on there, which pay tribute to our fans."

In April 2011, founding member K. K. Downing announced his departure from the band, citing differences with the band and management and a breakdown in their relationship as the reason. Richie Faulkner, guitarist for Lauren Harris' band, was announced as his replacement.

In an August 2011 interview with Billboard, Halford said that he and Tipton had "about 12 or 14 tracks completely mapped out" for a new studio album. He then said that four tracks were already recorded and mixed and suggested a new album would be out the next year. The year ended, however, without seeing a release. In another interview with Billboard in August 2012, Halford said that the band was taking its time with the album and did not give a definite release date.

In December 2013, the band released a short Christmas message on their official website, which confirmed that they would be releasing the album sometime in 2014.

On 17 March 2014 at the Ronnie James Dio Awards in Los Angeles, California, Halford announced that the album had been finished. On 28 April, the band revealed the title for the album, as well as releasing the title track for streaming on their official website. The track listing was announced four days later. At the end of June, a 20-date US tour supporting the album was confirmed.

== Album information ==
Guitarist Glenn Tipton gave a statement saying that fans should not expect wild experimentation.

Tipton explains that the reason the extra five tracks were not included on the standard release was due to the consistency of the songs the band chose with their choice to "release an undisputable heavy metal album".

The five bonus tracks from the deluxe edition were released as a stand-alone limited-edition 10" vinyl LP, entitled 5 Souls, for Record Store Day 2014.

Four of the album's songs have been performed live: "Halls of Valhalla", "Dragonaut", "March of the Damned" and the title track, with "Halls of Valhalla" reappearing in the setlist for the 2019 tour.

== Interviews ==
Halford describes the album's sound as "hard. It's heavy. It's something we think our Priest fans will be thrilled with. We know we have a reputation to maintain, and we know we have to deliver something really strong and solid. The album is going to be full of all the great things you love about Judas Priest — I don't think I can say anything more than that without being hung, drawn and quartered."

Halford says that fans can expect "the side of Priest that we haven't heard for a few years and reemphasize and remake those big, heavy metal statements again."

When asked how it was collaborating on new music with Faulkner, Halford told Guitar World in a 2012 interview: "Really, really strong. Exciting. He's riffing and saying, 'Robby, I'm thinking of this and this and this.' It's really exciting to have that kind of energy, because you feed off of it. It'll be great after having this two-month break from not seeing each other to reconvene in the studio in England and just sit in a room and go, 'OK, what've you got?' I know Richie's got a lot to share with us. He went through the ritual on this tour, did great work on stage, the fans embraced him, so it's now time to see what we're capable of, the writing trio of Glenn and Richie and myself. We've already got a lot of stuff in the flash drives, stuff that basically Glenn and myself put together while K. K. was mulling over whether he was going to stay or go. So before we launched the tour with Richie, we had a lot of material, and the bulk of it is very, very strong."

Regarding whether technology changed the band's songwriting process at all, Halford said: "It's dangerous to walk around with a flash drive on a bunch of keys. [Laughs] To a great extent, it doesn't really change. The technology is amazing in terms of the advantages it brings to music now, some of it good, some of it very bad. It's all about discipline and self-belief, determination, wanting to do the best you can do and not accepting anything that's below par. We've always had that attitude in Priest. We've always felt really strongly about any track that goes out for our fans. We're still doing it like we always have: firing up the riffs and finding a vocal melody to go with it, me going into my wonderful world of the Roget's Thesaurus and trying to come up with a new lyric and a new idea. And that's what we've been doing for four decades."

== Critical reception ==
Professional ratings
Aggregate scores
Source	Rating
AnyDecentMusic?	6.7/10
Metacritic	74/100
Review scores
Source	Rating
About.com	4.5/5 stars
AllMusic	3.5/5 stars
Blabbermouth	8/10
Drowned in Sound	7/10
Loudwire	4/5 stars
Metal Hammer	8/10
PopMatters	9/10
Revolver	4/5 stars
Rolling Stone	3.5/5 stars
Sputnikmusic	3/5

Redeemer of Souls has been largely praised by critics and has been hailed as a return for the band, following the lackluster response to its previous album Nostradamus. At Metacritic, that assigns a normalized rating out of 100 to reviews from mainstream critics, the album received an average score of 74, based on 10 reviews, which indicates "generally favorable reviews". At AnyDecentMusic?, that collates critical reviews from more than 50 media sources, the album scored 6.7 points out of 10, based on nine reviews.

Chad Bowar, reviewing for About.com, commented that new guitarist Richie Faulkner seemed to "energize" the band – and that even in his 60s, Halford still displayed ample vocal ability on the record. Bowar praised several of the album's songs, including "Sword of Damocles" and "Battle Cry". Andy McDonald of Drowned in Sound commented "...Redeemer Of Souls ticks just about every box in terms of an enjoyable heavy metal record. For the most part, it's suitably overblown, cocksure and blunt, and still goes some way to capturing the genre's eternal, endearing refusal to grow up. For now, that's reason enough to celebrate their return."

Allmusic's James Christopher Monger noted that the album was the "antithesis" to 2008's Nostradamus. Monger defined "Dragonaut" and "Metalizer" as the album's high points and stated that Redeemer of Souls deserves to stand alongside albums like Sad Wings of Destiny and British Steel. Kory Grow of Rolling Stone added "Above all, Redeemer is proof that Priest can still call themselves metal's defenders of the faith."

Ray Van Horn, Jr. of Blabbermouth.net stated that Faulkner and Tipton sound "just fine together, trading off solos and keeping their riffs glued tight", while at the same time lamenting K. K. Downing's absence.

In addition to the album receiving a generally positive response from reviewers, Brave Words & Bloody Knuckles listed Redeemer of Souls at No. 3 on their 2014 BravePicks list.

== Track listing ==
All tracks are written by Glenn Tipton, Rob Halford and Richie Faulkner

No.	Title	Length
1.	"Dragonaut"	4:26
2.	"Redeemer of Souls"	3:58
3.	"Halls of Valhalla"	6:04
4.	"Sword of Damocles"	4:54
5.	"March of the Damned"	3:55
6.	"Down in Flames"	3:56
7.	"Hell & Back"	4:46
8.	"Cold Blooded"	5:25
9.	"Metalizer"	4:37
10.	"Crossfire"	3:51
11.	"Secrets of the Dead"	5:41
12.	"Battle Cry"	5:18
13.	"Beginning of the End"	5:07
Total length:		61:58

Deluxe edition bonus disc/ 5 Souls EP
No.	Title	Length
1.	"Snakebite"	3:14
2.	"Tears of Blood"	4:19
3.	"Creatures"	4:25
4.	"Bring It On"	3:18
5.	"Never Forget"	6:25
Total length:		83:39

== Personnel ==
Judas Priest

- Rob Halford – vocals
- Glenn Tipton – guitars
- Richie Faulkner – guitars
- Ian Hill – bass guitar
- Scott Travis – drums

Production

- Mike Exeter – production, mixing
- Glenn Tipton – production, mixing
- Dick Beetham – mastering
- Mark Wilkinson – artwork
- David Farmer – special effects (Thunder in Dragonaut)

== Charts ==
=== Weekly charts ===
Weekly chart performance for Redeemer of Souls
Chart (2014)	Peak position
Australian Albums (ARIA)	31
Austrian Albums (Ö3 Austria)	6
Belgian Albums (Ultratop Flanders)	25
Belgian Albums (Ultratop Wallonia)	30
Canadian Albums (Billboard)	5
Czech Albums (ČNS IFPI)	1
Danish Albums (Hitlisten)	9
Dutch Albums (Album Top 100)	26
Finnish Albums (Suomen virallinen lista)	1
French Albums (SNEP)	22
German Albums (Offizielle Top 100)	3
Hungarian Albums (MAHASZ)	13
Irish Albums (IRMA)	32
Italian Albums (FIMI)	29
Japanese Albums (Oricon)	15
New Zealand Albums (RMNZ)	31
Norwegian Albums (VG-lista)	3
Polish Albums (ZPAV)	8
Scottish Albums (Official Charts)	12
Spanish Albums (Promusicae)	9
Swedish Albums (Sverigetopplistan)	5
Swiss Albums (Schweizer Hitparade)	6
UK Albums (Official Charts)	12
UK Rock & Metal Albums (Official Charts)	1
US Billboard 200	6
US Top Hard Rock Albums (Billboard)	1
US Top Rock Albums (Billboard)	1

=== Year-end charts ===
Year-end chart performance for Redeemer of Souls
Chart (2014)	Position
US Billboard Hard Rock Albums	19
US Billboard Rock Albums	60
