= Steel (Battle Beast album) =

Studio album by Battle Beast
- Released: 1 April 2011 (Finland); 27 January 2012 (worldwide)
- Recorded: 2009–2010
- Studio: Sonic Pump Studios, Helsinki
- Genre: Heavy metal, power metal
- Length: 46:12
- Label: Hype Productions
- Producer: Nino Laurenne

Battle Beast chronology
Steel (2011)	Battle Beast (2013)

Steel is the debut full-length album by the Finnish heavy metal band Battle Beast. It was released on 27 January 2012 and reached No. 7 on the Finnish Album Chart. It is the only album by the band to feature Nitte Valo on lead vocals.

== Influences ==
Steel borrows concepts and names from the manga Berserk, for example the lyrics of "Band of the Hawk": 'We are a mercenary band, led by Griffith, the white hawk.' "Iron Hand" similarly refers to protagonist Guts's iron arm, referring to him as the 'Black Swordsman'.

== Track listing ==
All tracks are written by Anton Kabanen.

No.	Title	Length
1.	"Enter the Metal World"	4:38
2.	"Armageddon Clan"	5:08
3.	"The Band of the Hawk"	4:40
4.	"Justice and Metal"	2:38
5.	"Steel"	4:20
6.	"Die-Hard Warrior"	2:56
7.	"Cyberspace"	3:59
8.	"Show Me How to Die"	4:19
9.	"Savage and Saint"	5:40
10.	"Iron Hand"	4:04
11.	"Victory"	3:50
Total length:		46:12

Bonus track
No.	Title	Length
12.	"Stay Black"	4:02
Total length:		50:14

== Personnel ==
=== Battle Beast ===
- Nitte Valo – lead vocals
- Juuso Soinio – guitars
- Anton Kabanen – guitars, backing vocals
- Eero Sipilä – bass, narrator and backing vocals
- Pyry Vikki – drums
- Janne Björkroth – keyboards, orchestral arrangements, backing vocals

=== Additional musicians ===
- Netta Dahlberg – additional backing vocals on track 2 and 8
- Joona Björkroth – additional backing vocals on track 8
- Nino Laurenne – backing vocals

=== Production ===
- Nino Laurenne – producer, engineer, mixing
- Jussi Kraft – engineer, mixing
- Svante Forsbäck – mastering
