= Warcry =

Warcry, War cry, WarCry or War Cry may refer to:

- Battle cry, a yell or chant taken up in battle
- Warcry (activist), Priya Reddy, Indian-American environmentalist and anarchist
- WarCry (band), a Spanish power metal band
  - WarCry (album), 2002
- WarCry (game), a collectible card game
- War Cry (graphic novel), by Jim Butcher
- War Cry (novel), a 2017 novel by Wilbur Smith
- WarCry Network, a web portal centered on MMOGs
- The War Cry, the official newspaper of the Salvation Army
- "War Cry", a 2023 song by &Team

== See also ==
- Battle cry (disambiguation)
