= Bringer of Pain =

Studio album by Battle Beast
- Released: 17 February 2017
- Genre: Heavy metal, power metal
- Length: 39:26
- Label: Nuclear Blast
- Producer: Janne Björkroth

Battle Beast chronology
Unholy Savior (2015)	Bringer of Pain (2017)	No More Hollywood Endings (2019)

Bringer of Pain is the fourth full-length album by the Finnish heavy metal band Battle Beast, released on 17 February 2017. It is the first album without lead guitarist, backing vocalist, and lead songwriter Anton Kabanen, and the first one to be produced by the band's keyboard player Janne Björkroth.

Bringer of Pain was awarded platinum in the band's native Finland and won the 'metal album of the year' in the Finnish Grammy's (Emma-gaala).

== Track listing ==
No.	Title	Lyrics	Music	Length
1.	"Straight to the Heart"	Eero Sipilä, Juuso Soinio	Sipilä	3:31
2.	"Bringer of Pain"	Noora Louhimo, Joona Björkroth	Joona Björkroth, Louhimo	3:04
3.	"King for a Day"	Janne Björkroth, Elise Widemark	Janne Björkroth	4:35
4.	"Beyond the Burning Skies"	Joona Björkroth	Joona Björkroth, Janne Björkroth	4:39
5.	"Familiar Hell"	Janne Björkroth, Widemark	Janne Björkroth	4:06
6.	"Lost in Wars" (feat. Tomi Joutsen)	Janne Björkroth, Widemark	Janne Björkroth	4:34
7.	"Bastard Son of Odin"	Joona Björkroth, Sipilä	Joona Björkroth, Sipilä	3:36
8.	"We Will Fight"	Soinio, Sipilä, Louhimo	Soinio, Sipilä, Janne Björkroth	3:30
9.	"Dancing with the Beast"	Janne Björkroth, Widemark	Janne Björkroth	3:44
10.	"Far from Heaven"	Janne Björkroth, Widemark	Janne Björkroth	4:23
Total length:				39:26

Bonus tracks
No.	Title	Lyrics	Music	Length
11.	"God of War"	Sipilä	Janne Björkroth, Soinio, Joona Björkroth	3:56
12.	"The Eclipse"	Joona Björkroth	Joona Björkroth	4:30
13.	"Rock Trash"	Janne Björkroth, Widemark	Janne Björkroth	3:13
Total length:				51:06

== Personnel ==
=== Battle Beast ===
- Noora Louhimo – lead vocals
- Joona Björkroth – lead guitar
- Juuso Soinio – rhythm guitar
- Eero Sipilä – bass, backing vocals
- Pyry Vikki – drums
- Janne Björkroth – keyboards

=== Guest appearances ===
- Tomi Joutsen – vocals on "Lost in Wars"

== Charts ==
Chart (2017)	Peak position
Austrian Albums (Ö3 Austria)	36
Belgian Albums (Ultratop Flanders)	77
Belgian Albums (Ultratop Wallonia)	64
Finnish Albums (Suomen virallinen lista)	1
French Albums (SNEP)	182
German Albums (Offizielle Top 100)	14
Scottish Albums (OCC)	87
Swedish Albums (Sverigetopplistan)	50
Swiss Albums (Schweizer Hitparade)	16
