= Battle Cry (video) =

Video by Judas Priest
- Released: 25 March 2016 (DVD); 1 April 2016 (Blu-ray)
- Recorded: 1 August 2015
- Venue: Wacken Open Air (Wacken, Schleswig-Holstein, Germany)
- Genre: Heavy metal
- Length: 1:34
- Label: Epic
- Producer: Tom Allom & Jack Ruston

Judas Priest chronology
Epitaph (2013)	Battle Cry (2016)

Professional ratings
Review scores
Source	Rating
Blabbermouth.net	9/10
Bravewords.com	8/10 stars
PureGrainAudio	8/10 stars
MediaMikes	4/5 stars

Battle Cry is a live video released by Judas Priest on 25 March 2016 on DVD and on 1 April 2016 on Blu-ray. It was filmed at the Wacken Open Air festival on 1 August 2015 in front of a capacity of 85,000 people. A CD version was also released bundled with the DVD version as well. Both DVD and Blu-ray formats contain three bonus tracks recorded from their 10 December 2015 show at the Ergo Arena in Gdańsk, Poland.

== Reception ==
Chad Bowar of Loudwire stated "Priest have released a plethora of live albums over the years, and Battle Cry is a worthy addition to that canon. It effectively captures this era of the band, who have aged extremely gracefully and show no signs of slowing down any time soon."

== Track listing ==
All songs written by Rob Halford, Glenn Tipton and K.K. Downing, except where indicated.

No.	Title	Writer(s)	Length
1.	"Battle Cry" (Intro)		0:54
2.	"Dragonaut"	Halford, Tipton, Richie Faulkner	4:12
3.	"Metal Gods"		4:12
4.	"Devil's Child"		5:20
5.	"Victim of Changes"	Al Atkins, Halford, Tipton, Downing	9:02
6.	"Halls of Valhalla"	Halford, Tipton, Faulkner	6:01
7.	"Turbo Lover"		6:00
8.	"Redeemer of Souls"	Halford, Tipton, Faulkner	4:45
9.	"Beyond the Realms of Death"	Halford, Les Binks	8:01
10.	"Jawbreaker"		4:21
11.	"Breaking the Law"		3:03
12.	"Hell Bent for Leather"	Tipton	4:57
13.	"The Hellion" (Intro)		0:38
14.	"Electric Eye"		4:39
15.	"You've Got Another Thing Comin'"		13:27
16.	"Painkiller"		7:17
17.	"Living After Midnight"		5:45

Bonus Tracks
No.	Title	Length
18.	"Screaming for Vengeance" (Recorded on 10 December 2015 in Gdańsk, Poland)	5:02
19.	"The Rage" (Recorded on 10 December 2015 in Gdańsk, Poland)	4:46
20.	"Desert Plains" (Recorded on 10 December 2015 in Gdańsk, Poland)	4:26

== Charts ==
Chart	Peak position
Swedish Albums Chart	1
Finnish Albums Chart	1
Canadian Albums Chart	1
US Billboard Music DVD Chart	1
Australian Albums Chart	3
German Albums Chart	3
Dutch Albums Chart	3
French Albums Chart	3
Belgian Albums Chart	4
Spanish Albums Chart	5
Austrian Albums Chart	7

== Personnel ==
- Rob Halford – Vocals
- Glenn Tipton – Guitar, Vocals
- Richie Faulkner – Guitar, Vocals
- Ian Hill – Bass
- Scott Travis – Drums
