= Battle Cry (play-by-mail game) =

Play-by-mail fantasy wargame

- Publishers: Post Age Games
- Years active: ~1989 to unknown
- Genres: fantasy wargame
- Languages: English
- Players: 15
- Playing time: Fixed
- Materials required: Instructions, order sheets, turn results, paper, pencil
- Media type: Play-by-mail
- Synonyms: Battle Cry: Lord Series

Battle Cry is a closed-ended, hand moderated, play-by-mail (PBM) fantasy wargame. It was published by Post Age Games. Players vied for control of a fantasy kingdom with victory depending on controlling a sufficiently large area for two turns. The game received mixed reviews in various gaming magazines in the late 1980s and 1990s.

== History and development ==
Battle Cry was a fantasy wargame published by Post Age Games of San Antonio, Texas. The game was hand moderated. The hand-moderation provided flexibility similar to a role-playing game. Kris Bowling was the gamemaster.

== Gameplay ==
Gameplay occurred on a 15×15 map. Players vied for control of a fantasy kingdom. At the outset, players started with "a wizard, a warrior knight, a dominion lord, a castle, a castle garrison, and two armies". Winning required controlling a sufficiently large region for two turns. Players controlled three character types, the indispensable Lord, Warrior Knights, and Wizards.

== Reception ==
Stewart Wieck reviewed the game in a 1990 issue of White Wolf. He described it as "a straight-forward, no-frills fantasy wargame". Out of 5 points, he rated it 2 points for Materials and Moderation, 3 points for Strategy, 4 points for Diplomacy, and an overall score of 3 points. John Schlosser reviewed the game in the March–April 1989 issue of Paper Mayhem. He stated, "Personally, I found Battle Cry lacking in depth and a bit simplistic. I prefer games that give you more options and that involve more than simple conquest. However, I think it could prove very entertaining to someone who is looking for an inexpensive ($3/turn) uncomplicated game which isn't very time consuming. Overall an excellent game for a PBM novice." Bert Cushman reviewed the game in a 1989 issue of Flagship, stating that it was "a fairly generic hand-moderated game, with no special features that distinguish it from many other fantasy wargames." He added that it was "reasonably priced, and may appeal to role-players and fantasy wargamers who feel constrained by computer-moderated games".

== See also ==
- List of play-by-mail games

== Bibliography ==
- Wieck, Stewart (June–July 1990). "Play-By-Mail Game Reviews: Battle Cry: Lord Series". White Wolf. No. 21. pp. 20, 22.
- Schlosser, John (March–April 1989). "Battle Cry". Paper Mayhem. No. 35. p. 39.
- Cushman, Bert (1989). "Battle Cry: Flexibility and Limits". Flagship. No. 24. pp. 24–25.
