= Nostradamus (album) =

- Cover art by Mark Wilkinson

Studio album by Judas Priest
- Released: 16 June 2008
- Recorded: 2006–2007
- Studio: The Old Smithy Studio, Kempsey, Worcester, UK
- Genre: Heavy metal; symphonic metal
- Length: 102:48
- Label: Columbia; Epic (US)
- Producer: Glenn Tipton, K. K. Downing

Judas Priest chronology
Angel of Retribution (2005)	Nostradamus (2008)	Redeemer of Souls (2014)

Nostradamus is the sixteenth studio album by the English heavy metal band Judas Priest. It is the band's first studio double album and first concept album, telling the life story of Nostradamus.

Initially announced for release in late 2006, the album's launch was postponed to 2007 before it was ultimately released on 16 June 2008 on Epic Records. It is the final Judas Priest studio album to feature the Painkiller-era lineup with guitarist and founding-member K. K. Downing leaving the band in April 2011.

To promote the album, Judas Priest toured with Motörhead, Heaven & Hell, and Testament on the Metal Masters Tour in August 2008. This was followed by a world tour in 2008 and 2009 in support of the album.

Professional ratings
Aggregate scores
Source	Rating
Metacritic	59/100
Review scores
Source	Rating
AllMusic	2.5/5 stars
Blabbermouth	5/10
The Boston Phoenix	3.5/5 stars
IGN	6.9/10
Mojo	3/5 stars
PopMatters	5/10
Q	3/5 stars
Rock Hard	6/10
Record Collector	4/5 stars
Sputnikmusic	2/5

== Development ==
The concept for Nostradamus originated from manager Bill Curbishley, and was pitched to the band during their 2005 tour in Estonia. Guitarist K. K. Downing revealed in a February 2007 interview with Brave Words & Bloody Knuckles that 18 tracks had been recorded, with a total runtime exceeding 90 minutes, adding that there was little he would want to cut.

Musically, the album features symphonic orchestrations, incorporating keyboards and choirs, marking a significant departure from the band’s previous work.

In November 2007, the band began mixing the album.

== Release ==
In November 2007, singer Rob Halford stated that it was still undecided whether Nostradamus would be released as a double-disc set. By April 2008, it was confirmed that the album would be issued as a double CD and triple vinyl LP.

Nostradamus debuted at No. 11 on the Billboard 200 chart after selling 42,000 copies in the United States during its first week of release. This was the band's highest-ever chart position in the U.S. until it was surpassed by Redeemer of Souls in 2014, which peaked at No. 6. According to Billboard.com, the album was released in Europe on 16 June 2008 and in the United States on 17 June 2008.

Three configurations of the album were issued. The most common version is a standard jewel-cased double CD. Additionally, a "CD deluxe hardbound version" was released, featuring a 48-page booklet, while a "super deluxe version" included three vinyl records alongside the deluxe CD packaging and a poster.

The title track was released as a free download on Judas Priest's website through Epic Records on 12 April 2008. The second single, "Visions," was released on 4 May 2008.

The title track was nominated for Best Metal Performance at the 51st Grammy Awards, while "Visions" was nominated for Best Hard Rock Performance.

The band expressed interest in performing the album in its entirety as part of a theatrical production, but the idea was ultimately scrapped, possibly due to the album's mixed reception among fans. Only two tracks from the album, "Prophecy" and "Death," were performed during the subsequent tour. "Prophecy" was also played on the Epitaph World Tour of 2011–2012.

== Reception ==
Nostradamus received a mixed reaction from critics and fans. Mike Stagno of Sputnikmusic noted that with Nostradamus, Judas Priest "has cast away both speed metal and hard rock in favour of a more symphonic metal approach," emphasizing synthesizers more prominently than in their previous work. Stagno acknowledged that the use of synthesizers was different from Judas Priest's 1986 album Turbo, but also noted it was "painfully obvious" that the band was struggling to adapt to this unfamiliar style.

James Christopher Monger of AllMusic described the album as "epic metal", similar to Iron Maiden’s 1988 album Seventh Son of a Seventh Son. However, he criticized the album for including "nearly every Spinal Tap cliché", such as "melodramatic spoken interludes" and "dated keyboard strings". Monger suggested that these elements contributed to the sense that the band was padding the album to fill two discs, asserting it "should have been" condensed into a single album.

In January 2009, Billboard stated that Nostradamus had sold over 100,000 copies in the United States and 500,000 copies worldwide.

In his 2020 memoir, Confess, Rob Halford reflected on the album, expressing pride in its creation and confidence that its reputation will improve over time. He also expressed his wish for the album to be played live in its entirety, as had been previously considered.

== Story line ==
Nostradamus tells the story of the life and times of Nostradamus. The first disc explores his various prophecies about the future, some of which are supposedly of an apocalyptic nature.

== Track listing ==
All tracks are written by K. K. Downing, Glenn Tipton and Rob Halford.

Disc one
No.	Title	Length
1.	"Dawn of Creation"	2:32
2.	"Prophecy"	5:27
3.	"Awakening"	0:53
4.	"Revelations"	7:05
5.	"The Four Horsemen"	1:35
6.	"War"	5:05
7.	"Sands of Time"	2:37
8.	"Pestilence and Plague"	5:09
9.	"Death"	7:34
10.	"Peace"	2:22
11.	"Conquest"	4:42
12.	"Lost Love"	4:28
13.	"Persecution"	6:34
Total length:		56:03

Disc two
No.	Title	Length
1.	"Solitude"	1:23
2.	"Exiled"	6:33
3.	"Alone"	7:50
4.	"Shadows in the Flame"	1:10
5.	"Visions"	5:24
6.	"Hope"	2:10
7.	"New Beginnings"	4:57
8.	"Calm Before the Storm"	2:05
9.	"Nostradamus"	6:43
10.	"Future of Mankind"	8:30
Total length:		46:45

== Personnel ==
Credits adapted from liner notes:

Judas Priest

- Rob Halford – vocals
- Glenn Tipton – guitars, guitar synthesizer
- K. K. Downing – guitars, guitar synthesizer
- Ian Hill – bass guitar
- Scott Travis – drums

Additional musicians

- Don Airey – keyboards
- Pete Whitfield – strings

Production

- Produced by Glenn Tipton & K. K. Downing
- Engineered by Richard Wood
- Mixed by Attie Bauw with Glenn Tipton & K. K. Downing
- Mastered by Attie Bauw and Darius Van Helfteren
- Artwork by Mark Wilkinson

== Charts ==
Chart (2008)	Peak position
Australian Albums (ARIA)	17
Austrian Albums (Ö3 Austria)	13
Canadian Albums Chart	9
Belgian Albums (Ultratop Flanders)	79
Belgian Albums (Ultratop Wallonia)	50
Danish Albums (Hitlisten)	17
Dutch Albums (Album Top 100)	38
French Albums (SNEP)	38
Finnish Albums (Suomen virallinen lista)	3
German Albums (Offizielle Top 100)	5
Hungarian Albums (MAHASZ)	12
Italian Albums (FIMI)	26
Japanese Albums (Oricon)	17
New Zealand Albums (RMNZ)	31
Norwegian Albums (VG-lista)	12
Scottish Albums (Official Charts)	30
Spanish Albums (Promusicae)	26
Swedish Albums (Sverigetopplistan)	5
Swiss Albums (Schweizer Hitparade)	12
UK Albums (Official Charts)	30
UK Rock & Metal Albums (Official Charts)	1
US Billboard 200	11

== Certifications ==
Region	Certification	Certified units/sales
Russia (NFPF)	Gold	10,000^{*}
^{*} Sales figures based on certification alone.

== Release history ==
Country	Date
Germany	13 June 2008
Australia	14 June 2008
United Kingdom	16 June 2008
Canada	17 June 2008
United States	17 June 2008
Japan	25 June 2008
