= Painkiller (disambiguation) =

Painkiller or analgesic is a group of drugs.

Painkillers or pain killer may also refer to:

== Games ==
- Painkiller (video game), a 2004 first-person shooter for the PC and Xbox
  - Painkiller: Resurrection, an expansion pack for the 2004 game
  - Painkiller: Hell & Damnation, a remake of the 2004 game

== Music ==
=== Bands ===
- Painkiller (band), a band led by John Zorn and Bill Laswell

=== Albums ===
- Pain Killer (Energy Orchard album), 1995
- Pain Killer (Krokus album), 1978
- Pain Killer (Little Big Town album), 2014
- Pain Killer (Moumoon album), 2013
- Painkiller (Jim Bianco album), 2006
- Painkiller (Judas Priest album), 1990
- Painkiller, a 1992 album by Sue Ann Carwell
- Painkiller, a 2012 re-release edition of the EP Russian Roulette, or the song
- Painkillers (EP), a 1993 EP by Babes in Toyland

=== Songs ===
- "Pain Killer" (Iceage song), 2018
- "Painkillerr" a song by Polish band Mech
- "Pain Killer" (Little Big Town song), 2015
- "Pain Killer" (Turin Brakes song), 2003
- "Painkiller" (Freestylers song), 2006
- "Painkiller" (Jason Derulo song), 2015
- "Painkiller" (Judas Priest song), 1990
- "Painkiller" (Ruel song), 2019
- "Painkiller" (Three Days Grace song), 2014
- "Painkiller", a song by Blackbear from In Loving Memory
- "Painkiller", a song by Ted Nugent from Little Miss Dangerous
- "Painkiller", a song by Depeche Mode, the B-side of "Barrel of a Gun"
- "Painkiller", a song by Dreamers from This Album Does Not Exist
- "Painkiller", a song by Halestorm from Vicious
- "Painkiller", a song by Death from The Sound of Perseverance

== Television ==
- Painkiller (TV series), a 2023 American drama limited series
- "Painkiller" (Black Lightning episode)
- Painkiller (Arrowverse)

== Other uses ==
- Painkiller (cocktail), a rum cocktail
- Painkiller (comics), a DC Comics supervillain
- Painkiller (magazine), a Chinese heavy-metal music magazine
- The Painkiller (play), by Sean Foley, adapted from Francis Veber's Le Contract
- Painkiller, a 2011 short film starring Benedict Wong
- Painkillers (film), a 2018 film directed by Roxy Shih

== See also ==
- "Painkillr", song by Erika Jayne
