= Claudio Bergamin =

Italian artist

Claudio Bergamin is a Chilean/Italian fantasy artist. He creates album covers for rock bands and book covers for paranormal authors.

== Artwork ==
Bergamin's style is realistic fantasy illustration. He has created artwork for a wide number of rock and metal bands from Europe and America such as Paradox, Criminal, Chilean pop icons Lucybell, the "metal god" Rob Halford, the Dutch musician Arjen Lucassen, for whom he created all the artwork of Lost in the New Real. He then created two album covers for the finnish band Battle Beast. Over several years, he has created artwork for the classic Argentinean band Rata Blanca including the cover of the album Tormenta Eléctrica. In recent years, he has created art inspired by the world of the paranormal, working independently, as well as professionally on book covers for leading cryptozoology researchers such as Lyle Blackburn and Loren Coleman. Similarly, he has produced illustrations in close collaboration with public personalities of the paranormal, such as Travis Walton (Fire in the Sky) and Bob Gimlin (Patterson–Gimlin film). In 2017, AFM Records commissioned the album cover of Phoenix, the return of the Swedish band Nocturnal Rites. Also during 2017, the British heavy metal band Judas Priest entrusted him with the creation of the cover artwork of their 2018 album Firepower, released on March 9 of 2018.
