= Lauren Harris =

British singer

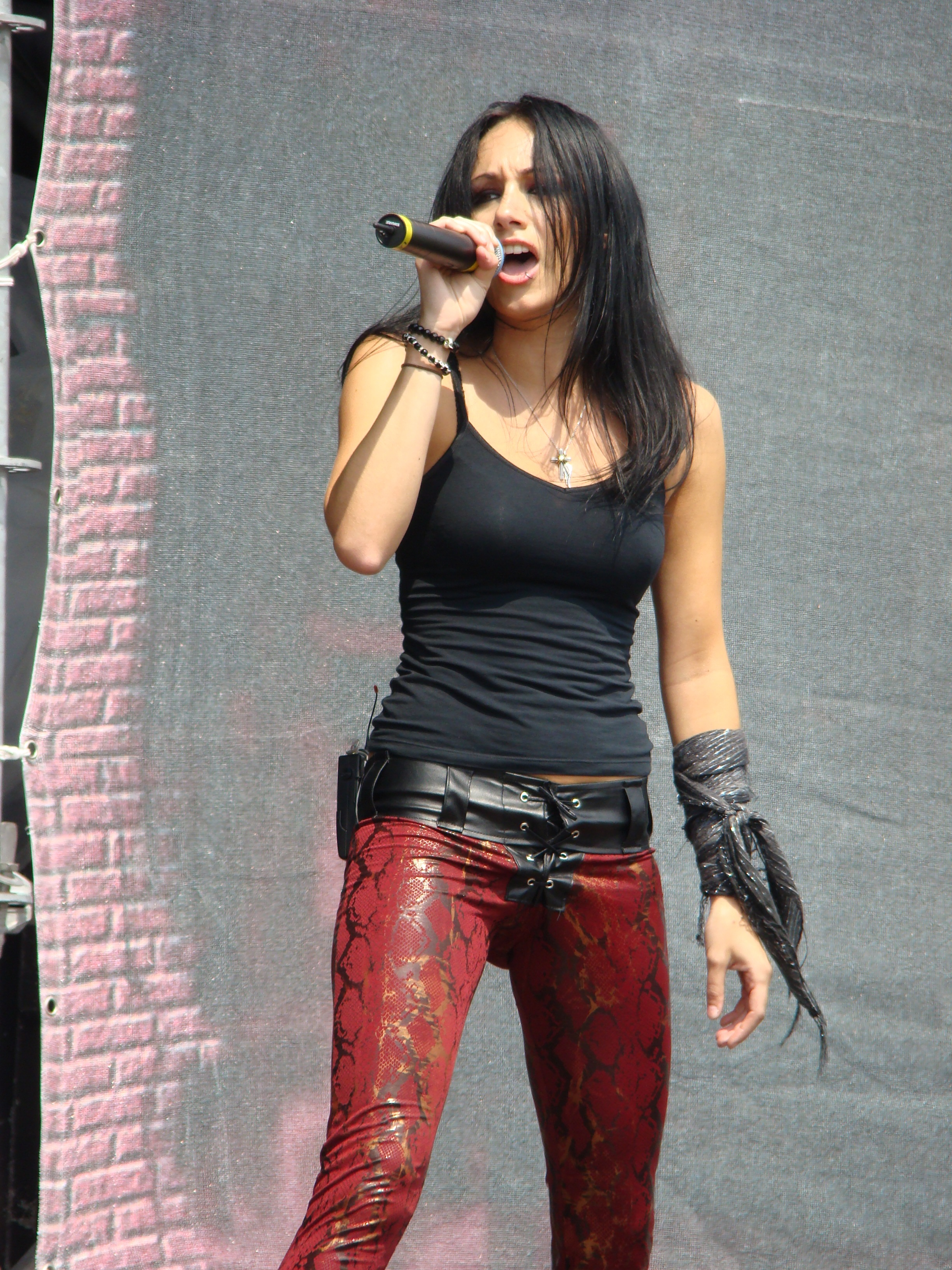
- Lauren Harris in 2009

Background information
- Born: Lauren Harris; 6 July 1984 (age 42); Essex, England
- Genres: Hard rock; heavy metal; pop rock
- Occupations: Musician; vocalist; actress
- Instrument: Vocals
- Years active: 2005–present
- Labels: Demolition DR2 Records; Transcend Music

Lauren Harris (born 6 July 1984) is a British rock singer and classically trained actress. She released one solo album, Calm Before the Storm, in 2008.

== Early life ==
She is the daughter of Steve Harris, the bassist of Iron Maiden, and Lorraine Harris. After completing her primary and secondary education at Saint Nicholas School, Old Harlow, Essex, Harris attended Leventhorpe School, Sawbridgeworth, Hertfordshire, where she obtained her A-Levels, including Theatre Studies. Harris is a graduate of the London Academy of Music and Dramatic Art and the Oxford School of Drama.

== Career ==
=== Music ===
Harris began her music career singing in pubs in 2005, and went on to record demo material for Russ Ballard. From 2005 to 2008, Harris worked with the songwriter and producer Tom McWilliams, who assisted with song arrangement and composition. McWilliams also toured with Harris, performing as the band's drummer.

Harris toured Europe, playing outdoor festivals such as the German Rock Am Ring, Rock Am Park and UK Download festivals.

Harris supported Iron Maiden on their A Matter of Life and Death world tour, playing at Dubai and the Brixton Academy, London, amongst other venues. In 2008 Harris released her debut album entitled Calm Before the Storm, mixed by Kevin Shirley. She continued to tour the UK and Europe in support of the release and joined Iron Maiden on the Somewhere Back In Time World tour.

In 2008 Harris named musical influences including Belinda Carlisle, Shakespears Sister, Alanis Morissette, Heart, Def Leppard and Foo Fighters. In addition to supporting Iron Maiden, she toured as a support act with bands such as Alice Cooper, Within Temptation, and Mötley Crüe.

From 2010, following lineup changes, the she and her band began touring under the new name "Six Hour Sundown". The band recorded new tracks at Compass Point Studios in the Bahamas but only Jekyll & Hyde saw commercial release, becoming available as a single for download in 2011. The band played numerous festivals before deciding to part ways in late 2012.

In 2013, Harris moved to Los Angeles to commence work on a new musical project, Kingdom of I, with songwriter and producer Dave Stewart and drummer Shauney Recke. The debut track Crying at the Disco was released as a free download on SoundCloud in late 2013.

A Spotify playlist posted to the official Kingdom of I Facebook, intended to give a flavour for the type of music to expect on the album, cited musical influences such as Flyleaf, Muse, Paramore, Stone Sour, Annie Lennox and Stevie Nicks.

=== Acting ===
While in Los Angeles to work on Kingdom of I, Harris undertook classes in acting at Howard Fine Studios. She continued her training by completing a semester in classical acting at the London Academy of Music and Dramatic Art in 2014. In September 2016, Harris graduated from a one-year postgraduate course in acting at the Oxford School of Drama.

Between 2013 and 2015, Harris completed work in principal photography for the feature film, Adrift In Soho, which was released in 2018.

In September 2013, Harris was named as one of Variety Magazine's "10 Brits To Watch".

Harris has appeared in numerous stage productions, including A Streetcar Named Desire at London's Pack and Carriage and Measure For Measure at Oxford's North Wall, which received favourable reviews. In November 2016, she appeared in the role of Beth Armstrong for the BBC Radio 4 play Michael and Boris: The Two Brexiteers.

Harris' musical experience has influenced her acting career, with her recording an original song for a commercial for the technology company Eizo, and her role as the Witch in a production of the musical Into The Woods at the Oxford School of Drama.

In November 2016, Harris appeared in the role of sound technician in the music video for Bring Me the Horizon’s single "Oh No". Harris’ other work includes Global commercial roles for the companies Eizo Global, Active Digital, and Coms Plc.

== Line-up ==
Solo
Lauren Harris – vocals (2005–2010)
Randy Gregg – bass guitar, backing vocals (2005–2010)
Richie Faulkner – guitars, backing vocals (2005–2010)
Tommy McWilliams – drums (2005–2008)
Olly Smith – drums (2008–2010)
Six Hour Sundown
Lauren Harris – vocals (2010–2012)
Olly Smith – drums (2010–2012)
Tommy Gentry – guitars (2010–2012)
James Bennet – guitars (2010–2012)
Mitch Witham – bass (2010–2012)
Kingdom of I
Lauren Harris – vocals (2013)
Shauney Recke – drums (2013)

== Discography ==
Lauren Harris Band
Calm Before the Storm (2008)
Your Turn (2009)
Six Hour Sundown
Jekyll and Hyde (2011)
Kingdom of I
Crying at the Disco (2013)

== Filmography ==
=== Film ===
| Year | Film | Role | Director | Company | Notes |
|---|---|---|---|---|---|
| 2009 | Iron Maiden: Flight 666 | Self | Sam Dunn, Scot McFadyen | Banger Films | Documentary |
| 2016 | Graft | Grace | Johnny Burke | Thunderbolt Productions | Short |
| 2016 | The Lonely Road | Maggie | Robert Dowling | Dowling Productions | Short |
| 2016 | Light | Lara | George Peck | The Oxford School of Drama | |
| 2016 | Longing | Varia | Jane Arnell | The Oxford School of Drama | |
| 2017 | Adrift In Soho | Myra | Pablo Behrens | Burning Films | |
| 2017 | Royal Recipes | Voiceover | Viggo Oprita | BBC Creative | TV promo |
| 2017 | The Interrogation | Agent Emily Clarke | Tung-Ying Hsieh | London Film School | Short |
| 2017 | Calling Home | Hotel Staff | Megan K. Fox | | Short |

=== Stage ===
| Year | Title | Character | Director | Company |
|---|---|---|---|---|
| 2014 | Women Beware Women | Bianca | Nick Hutchinson | LAMDA |
| 2014 | Twelfth Night | Feste/Fabian | Tina Marian | LAMDA |
| 2014 | The Winter's Tale | Hermione | Matthew Smith | LAMDA |
| 2016 | A Streetcar Named Desire | Blanche Dubois | Vince Ade | Fox and Chips |
| 2016 | Philistines | Elena | Steve Woodward | The Oxford School of Drama |
| 2016 | Into The Woods | Witch | Louisa Farrant | The Oxford School of Drama |
| 2016 | Time and the Conways | Joan | Steve Woodward | The Oxford School of Drama |
| 2016 | Closer | Alice | Kirsty McFarland | The Oxford School of Drama |
| 2016 | Measure For Measure | Mistress Overdone | Oscar Toeman | The Oxford School of Drama |
| 2016 | Flashes | Street Cleaner | Polina Kalinina | Soho Theatre |
| 2017 | Oxblood Red | Katie | Chris Terrell | Union Theatre |

=== Radio ===
| Year | Title | Character | Director | Company |
|---|---|---|---|---|
| 2016 | Michael and Boris: The Two Brexiteers | Beth Armstrong | Dirk Maggs | BBC Radio 4 |
| 2016 | For Services Rendered | Mrs Ardseley | Jane Morgan | The Oxford School of Drama |
| 2016 | Colder Than Here | Harriet | Jonathan Tafler | The Oxford School of Drama |

=== Music videos ===
| Year | Artist | Title | Role | Company | Director |
|---|---|---|---|---|---|
| 2016 | Bring Me the Horizon | Oh No | Music Engineer | Forever Pictures | Isaac Eastgate |
| 2012 | Six Hour Sundown | Shadow Of My Past | Self | Endless Media, We Are Sweet | |
| 2012 | Six Hour Sundown | Jekyll & Hyde | Self | Transcend Music | John McMurtrie |
| 2009 | Lauren Harris Band | Your Turn - Live In Dubai | Self | The Orchard, Lauren Harris Ltd. | |
| 2008 | Lauren Harris Band | Steal Your Fire | Self | Lauren Harris Ltd. | |
| 2006 | Lauren Harris Band | Your Turn | Self | Monstro Visionary Entertainment | |
| 2006 | Lauren Harris Band | Get Over It | Self | Ars Nova Revolution | Pablo Erminy |
