= Battle Beast (band) =

Finnish heavy metal band

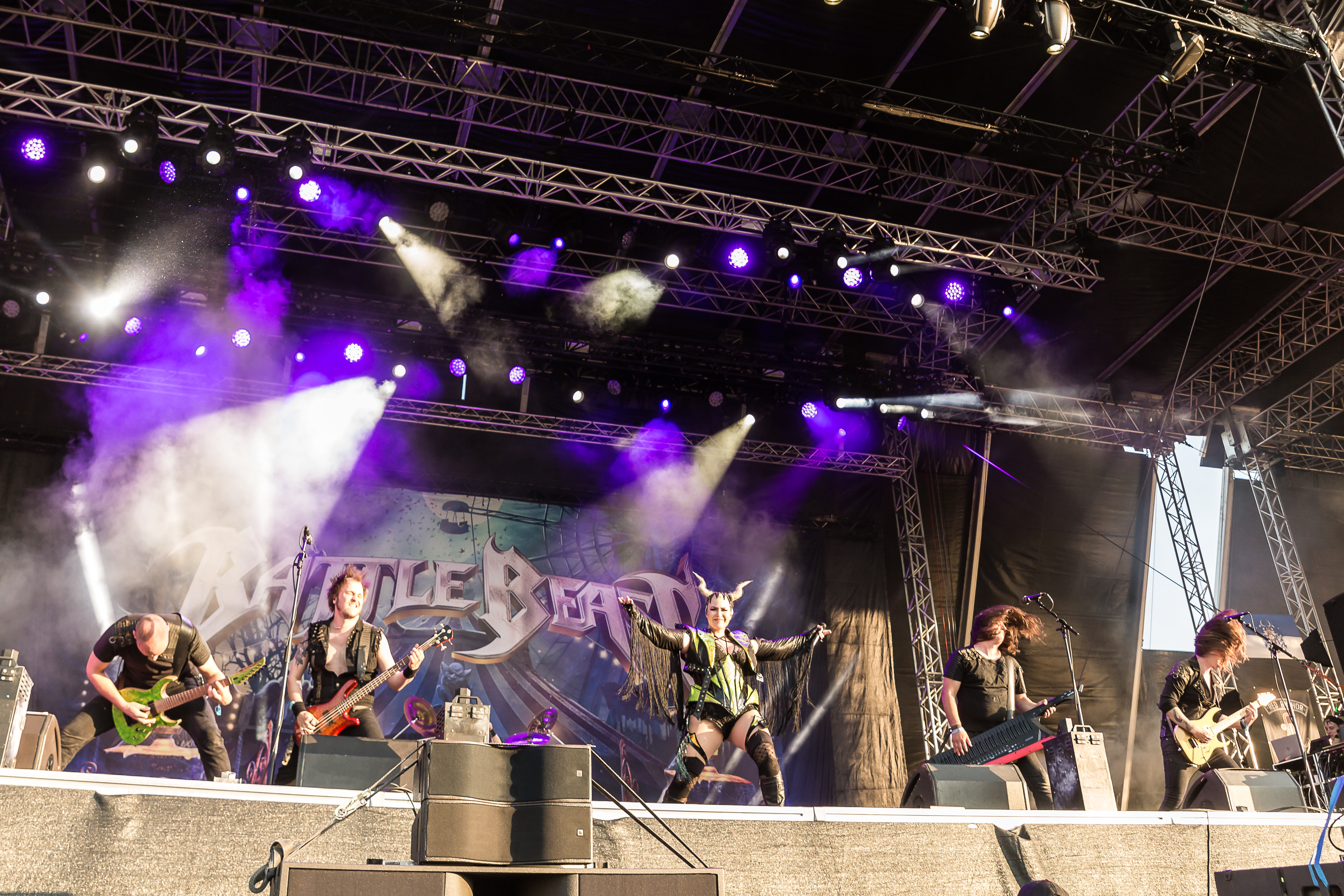
- Battle Beast at Rockharz Open Air 2023

Background information
- Origin: Helsinki, Finland
- Genres: Heavy metal; power metal
- Years active: 2008–present
- Labels: WEA, Nuclear Blast
- Spinoffs: Beast in Black
- Members: Juuso Soinio; Pyry Vikki; Eero Sipilä; Janne Björkroth; Joona Björkroth; Marina La Torraca
- Past members: Nitte Valo; Anton Kabanen; Noora Louhimo
- Website: battlebeast.fi

Battle Beast is a Finnish heavy metal band formed in Helsinki in 2008 by Anton Kabanen, Juuso Soinio and Pyry Vikki. The initial line-up consisted of guitarists Soinio and Kabanen, and drummer Vikki, who were high school friends. The rest of the early lineup, bassist Eero Sipilä and lead singer Nitte Valo, joined the band after auditions, while keyboardist Janne Björkroth joined through personal connections. As of 2025, the band has released seven studio albums.

== History ==
Before gaining a record contract, Battle Beast was best known for having won two major band competitions in 2010. They won the international Wacken Metal Battle 2010, with contributions from thousands of bands from all around the world, whose final stage was held at the famed German metal festival Wacken Open Air. Soon after, the band was announced the winner of Radio Rock Starba, a band competition held by the major Finnish radio station Radio Rock. With its victory in the Finnish competition, the band received intense media exposure, and before the end of 2010 they had signed a record deal with the Finnish label Hype Records.

Battle Beast's first album, Steel, was released in Finland in Spring 2011. With the support of the two singles, "Show Me How to Die" and "Enter the Metal World", and their heavy airplay on Radio Rock, the album peaked at No. 7 upon its release. Although released only in Finland, the album soon caught the attention of the international metal label Nuclear Blast, with whom the band signed a licensing deal in late 2011. A reissue of Steel, which included one bonus track, was released to the European market in January 2012. The band was voted third place on the Newcomer Of The Year 2011 list at the Finnish Metal Awards in February 2012. To support the European release of Steel, Battle Beast toured as opening act for their countrymen Nightwish in many European dates of the Imaginaerum World Tour. On the final show of the tour Nightwish paid their respects to the support band by performing a cover of "Show Me How to Die" as a part of their acoustic set.

In autumn of 2012, after touring Finnish rock festivals during the summer, Nitte Valo was announced to be leaving the band because of family issues. New singer candidates appeared both in Finland and abroad. Noora Louhimo from Tampere, Finland, was chosen as the new lead singer, with Kabanen having originally found her "by accident while browsing YouTube". With Louhimo in the band, Battle Beast started another European tour in November, this time supporting the Finnish power metal band Sonata Arctica.

After the tour, the band immediately went into studio to record their second album. The label Hype Productions had gone out of business and the band moved on to Warner Music Finland, with Nuclear Blast still handling international releases. The first single with Noora Louhimo on vocals, "Into the Heart of Danger" was released on 26 April 2013, followed by the album Battle Beast on 17 May 2013. Another single and a music video for the song "Black Ninja" was released to coincide with the release of the album. The album topped the sales of its predecessor easily, peaking at No. 5 and staying on the charts for 17 weeks. The album also charted on various European countries including Germany. The following autumn Battle Beast headed on another European tour, this time supporting the German bands Powerwolf and U.D.O.

In January 2015, Battle Beast released its third album, Unholy Savior, topping the Finnish album chart on its release week. Soon after a European tour supporting Sabaton, in February 2015 the band parted ways with Anton Kabanen with both parties citing musical disagreements and other unsolvable issues within the band. He was replaced by Ossi Maristo and keyboardist Janne Björkroth's brother and Brymir bandmate, Joona Björkroth, on a sessional basis. Joona Björkroth became a permanent member in 2016. Kabanen went on to form Beast in Black.

The first single with the renewed line-up "King For a Day" was released in January 2016, immediately picking up heavy airplay in Finland's Radio Rock, followed by another single "Familiar Hell" in early 2017. Battle Beast released their fourth album Bringer of Pain on 17 February 2017 again topping the charts in their homeland and eventually going platinum there. The album was also the band’s first to reach the top 20 in Germany, debuting at #14 on its release week.

Following the release of Bringer of Pain, Battle Beast went on a 5+ week European tour with support from Majesty and GYZE. The band toured for the first time in North America that spring, supporting Sabaton's "The Last Tour" with Leaves' Eyes.

On 22 March 2019, Battle Beast released their fifth studio album, No More Hollywood Endings. The album was awarded as Metal album of the year in Finnish Grammy’s (Emma-gaala) and has been awarded with a gold album in the bands native Finland.

On 4 October 2021, the band announced their sixth studio album, Circus of Doom. It was released on 21 January 2022, again topping the Finnish album chart and reaching top 10 in Germany. Following the album's release, the band toured North America as the headliner for the first time, with support from Blackbriar.

On 5 June 2025, the band announced their seventh studio album, Steelbound. It was released on 17 October 2025. The band’s European tour began on the same day as their album release at Inselpark Arena, their biggest German headline show to date. The tour included Dominum and Majestica as supporting acts. Shortly after the European tour, Louhimo departed from the band on 15 December 2025, to focus on her solo career. The next day, Marina La Torraca was announced as the new lead vocalist of Battle Beast.

== Band members ==
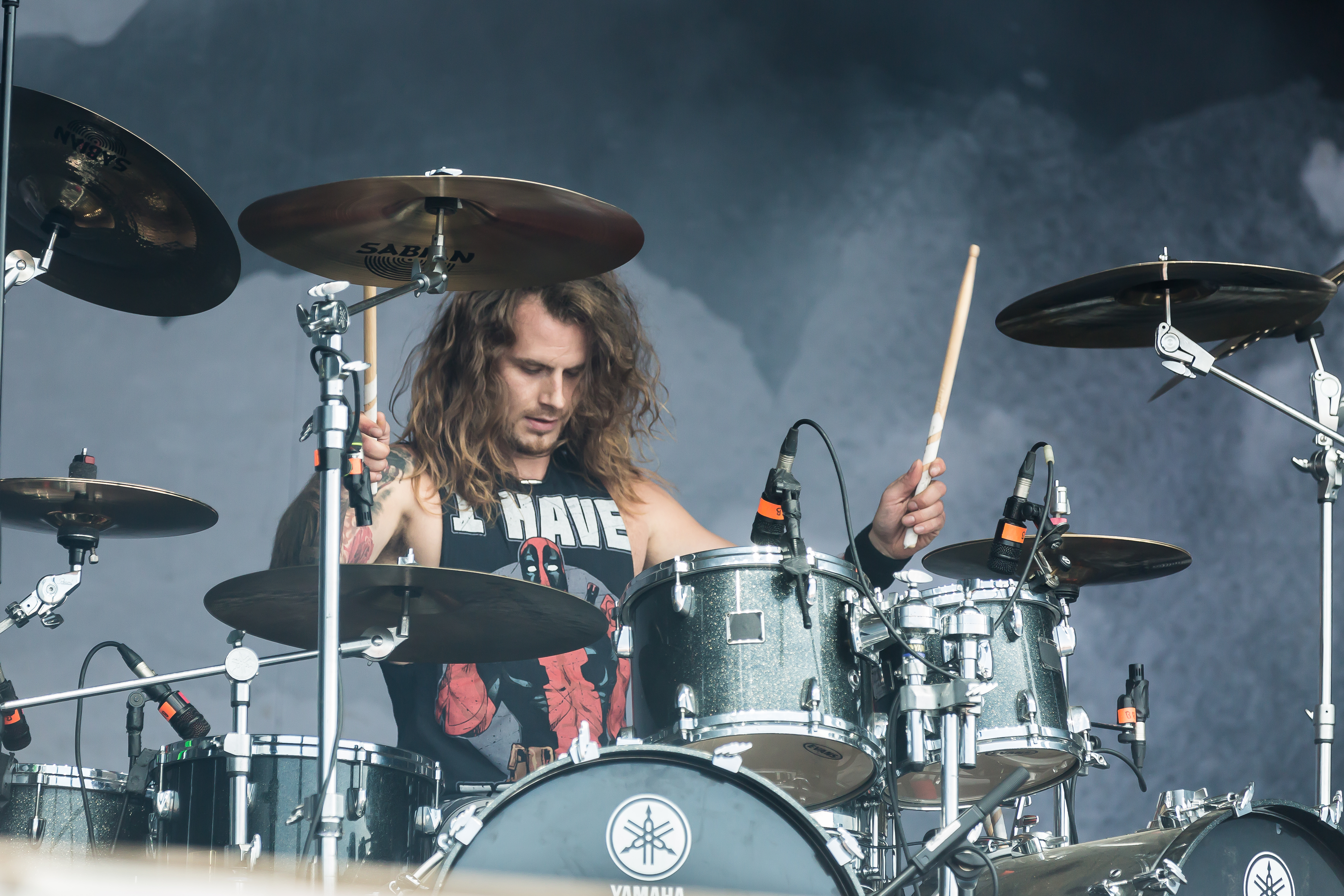
Pyry Vikki

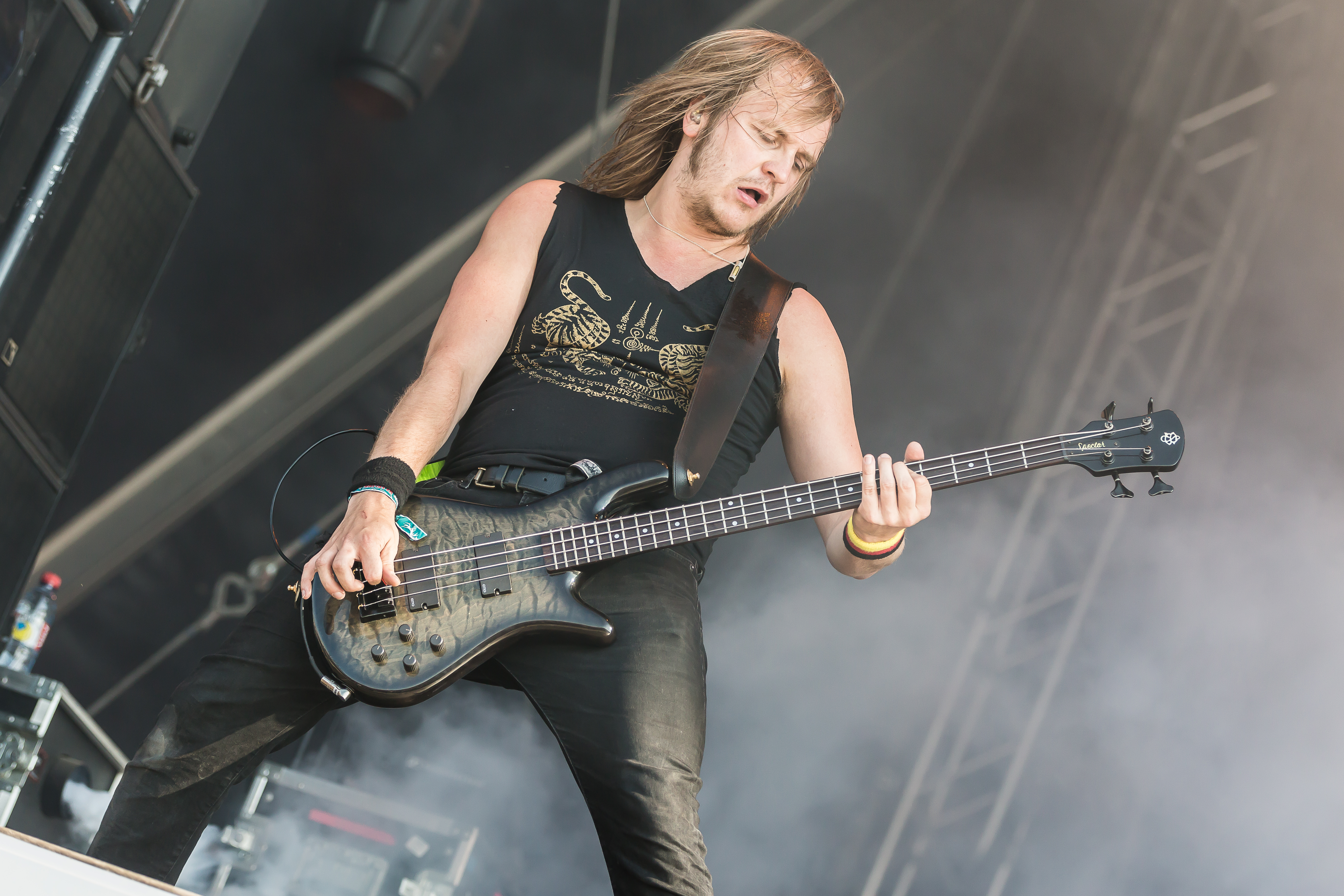
Eero Sipilä

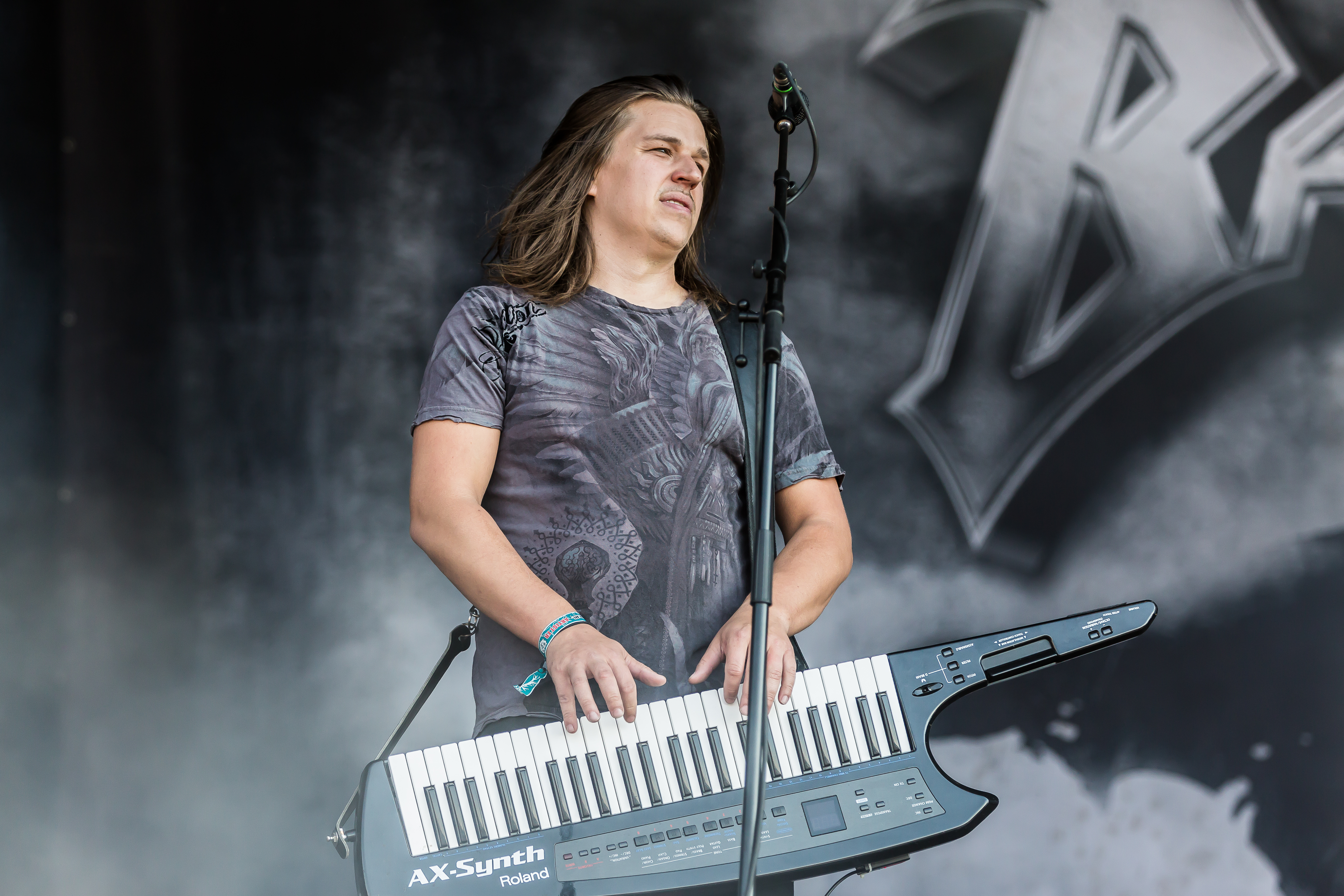
Janne Björkroth

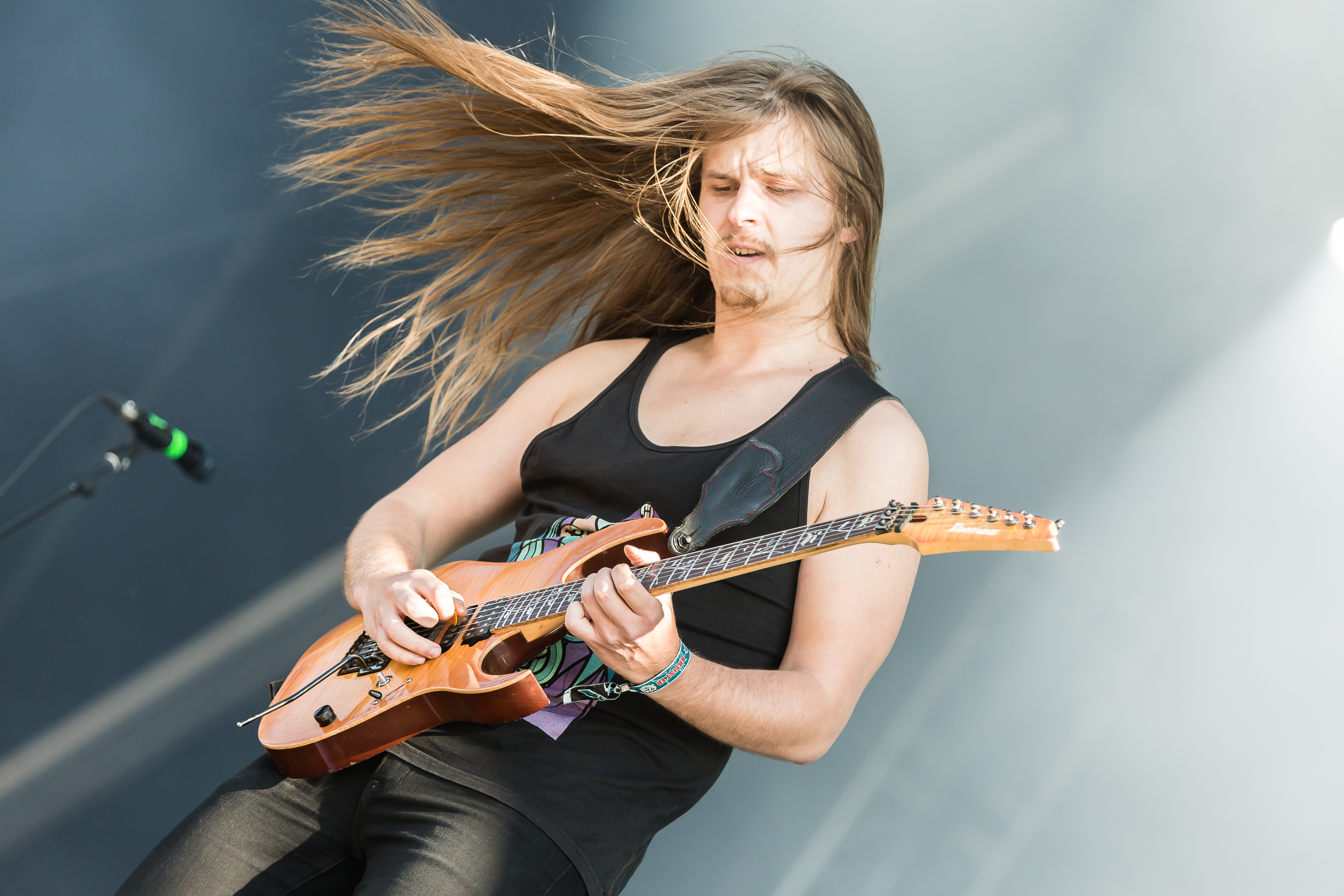
Joona Björkroth

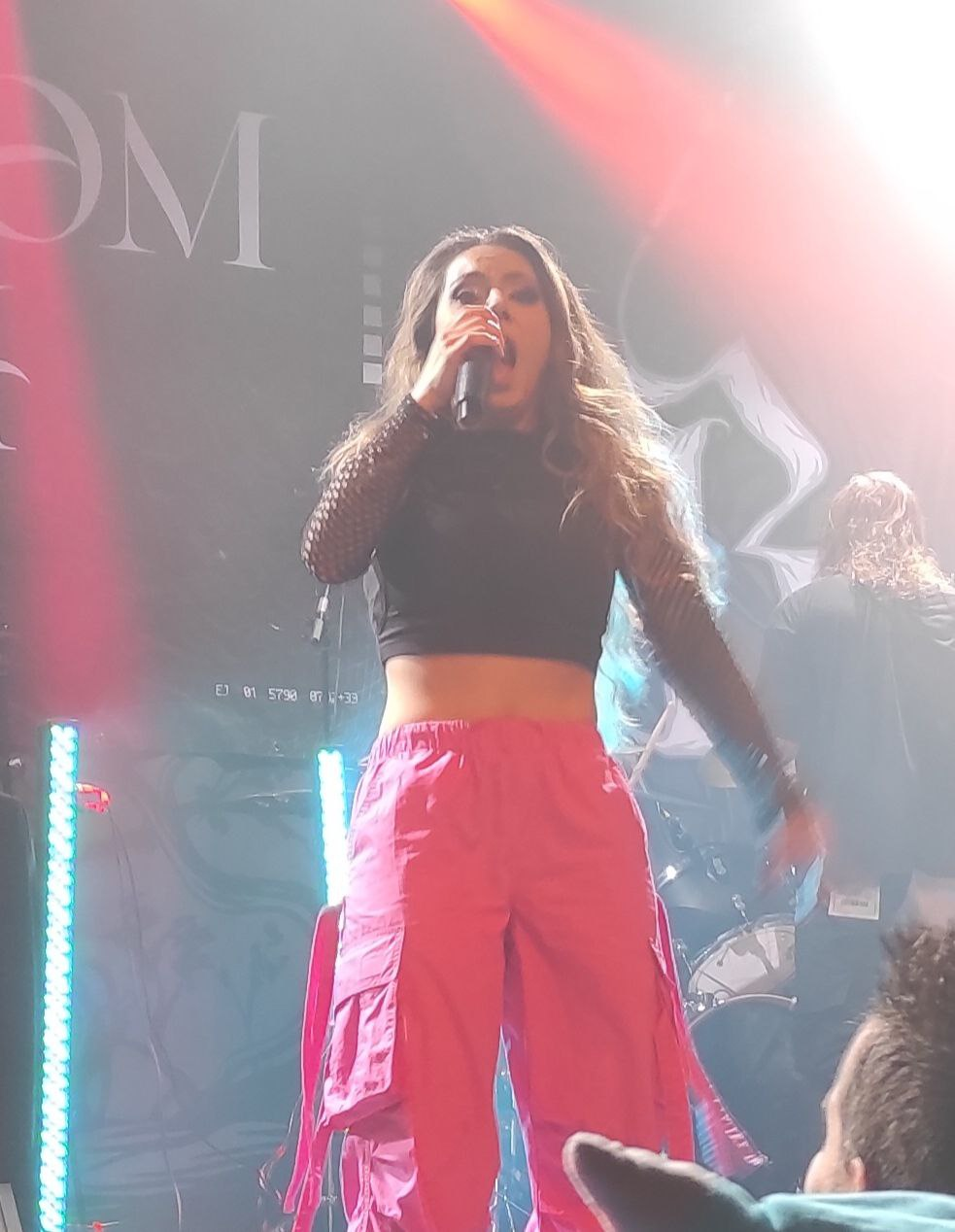
Marina La Torraca

=== Current ===
- Juuso Soinio – rhythm guitar (2008–present)
- Pyry Vikki – drums (2008–present)
- Eero Sipilä – bass, backing vocals (2008–present)
- Janne Björkroth – keytar, backing vocals (2008–present)
- Joona Björkroth – lead guitar, backing vocals (2015–present)
- Marina La Torraca – lead vocals (2025–present)

=== Former ===
- Nitte Valo – lead vocals (2008–2012)
- Anton Kabanen – lead guitar, backing vocals (2008–2015)
- Noora Louhimo – lead vocals (2012–2025)

=== Touring ===
- Ossi Maristo – lead guitar (2015)
- Atte Aho – lead guitar (2022, 2024)

== Discography ==
=== Albums ===
Year	Album	Peak positions					Certifications
Year	Album	FIN	BEL	GER	NOR Phys.	SWI	Certifications
2011	Steel	7	–	–	–	–	
2013	Battle Beast	5	111	82	–	77	
2015	Unholy Savior	1	–	39	–	71	
2017	Bringer of Pain	1	64	14	–	16	
2019	No More Hollywood Endings	1	190	11	–	12	
2022	Circus of Doom	1	–	9	–	5	
2025	Steelbound	2	–	18	8	12	

=== Singles ===
- "Show Me How to Die" (2011)
- "Enter the Metal World" (2011)
- "Into the Heart of Danger" (2013)
- "Black Ninja" (2013)
- "Touch in the Night" (2014)
- "Madness" (2014)
- "King for a Day" (2016)
- "Familiar Hell" (2017)
- "Bringer of Pain (2017)
- "No More Hollywood Endings" (2019)
- "Eden" (2019)
- "Endless Summer" (2019)
- "The Golden Horde" (2019)
- "Master of Illusion" (2021)
- "Eye of the Storm" (2021)
- "Where Angels Fear to Fly" (2022)
- "Wings of Light" (2022)
- "Last Goodbye" (2025)
- "Steelbound" (2025)
- "Here We Are" (2025)
- "Angel of Midnight" (2025)
