= Battle Cry (Judas Priest album) =

Live album by Judas Priest
- Released: 25 March 2016
- Recorded: 1 August 2015
- Venue: Wacken Open Air (Wacken, Germany)
- Genre: Heavy metal
- Length: 75:28
- Label: Epic
- Producer: Tom Allom & Jack Ruston

Judas Priest chronology
A Touch of Evil: Live (2009)	Battle Cry (2016)

Professional ratings
Review scores
Source	Rating
AllMusic	3/5 stars

Battle Cry is the sixth live album by English heavy metal band Judas Priest, released on 25 March 2016. It was recorded at the Wacken Open Air festival in Germany on 1 August 2015 during their Redeemer of Souls Tour. The album was released as both a standalone title and a bundled package containing the DVD version.

== Track listing ==
All lyrics are written by Rob Halford, Glenn Tipton and K.K. Downing except where noted.

No.	Title	Writer(s)	Length
1.	"Battle Cry" (Intro)		0:33
2.	"Dragonaut"	Halford, Tipton, Richie Faulkner	4:12
3.	"Metal Gods"		4:13
4.	"Devil's Child"		5:18
5.	"Victim of Changes"	Al Atkins, Halford, Tipton, Downing	8:58
6.	"Halls of Valhalla"	Halford, Tipton, Faulkner	6:07
7.	"Redeemer of Souls"	Halford, Tipton, Faulkner	4:10
8.	"Beyond the Realms of Death"	Halford, Les Binks	7:01
9.	"Jawbreaker"		4:05
10.	"Breaking the Law"		2:47
11.	"Hell Bent for Leather"	Tipton	4:26
12.	"The Hellion" (Intro)		0:36
13.	"Electric Eye"		4:36
14.	"You've Got Another Thing Comin'"		11:02
15.	"Painkiller"		7:25

=== Note ===
Two songs Judas Priest performed at the festival, "Turbo Lover" and "Living After Midnight", were omitted from the album. However, they do appear on the video release.

== Personnel ==
- Rob Halford – lead vocals
- Glenn Tipton – guitars, backing vocals
- Richie Faulkner – guitars, backing vocals
- Ian Hill – bass guitar
- Scott Travis – drums, backing vocals

== Charts ==
Chart (2016)	Peak position
Austrian Albums (Ö3 Austria)	57
Belgian Albums (Ultratop Flanders)	78
Belgian Albums (Ultratop Wallonia)	90
French Albums (SNEP)	180
German Albums (Offizielle Top 100)	29
Hungarian Albums (MAHASZ)	28
Japanese Albums (Oricon)	78
Norwegian Albums (VG-lista)	37
Scottish Albums (OCC)	63
Spanish Albums (PROMUSICAE)	60
Swiss Albums (Schweizer Hitparade)	34
UK Rock & Metal Albums (OCC)	5
US Billboard 200	90
US Top Hard Rock Albums (Billboard)	9
US Top Rock Albums (Billboard)	25
US Indie Store Album Sales (Billboard)	11
