= Richie Faulkner =

English guitarist (born 1980)

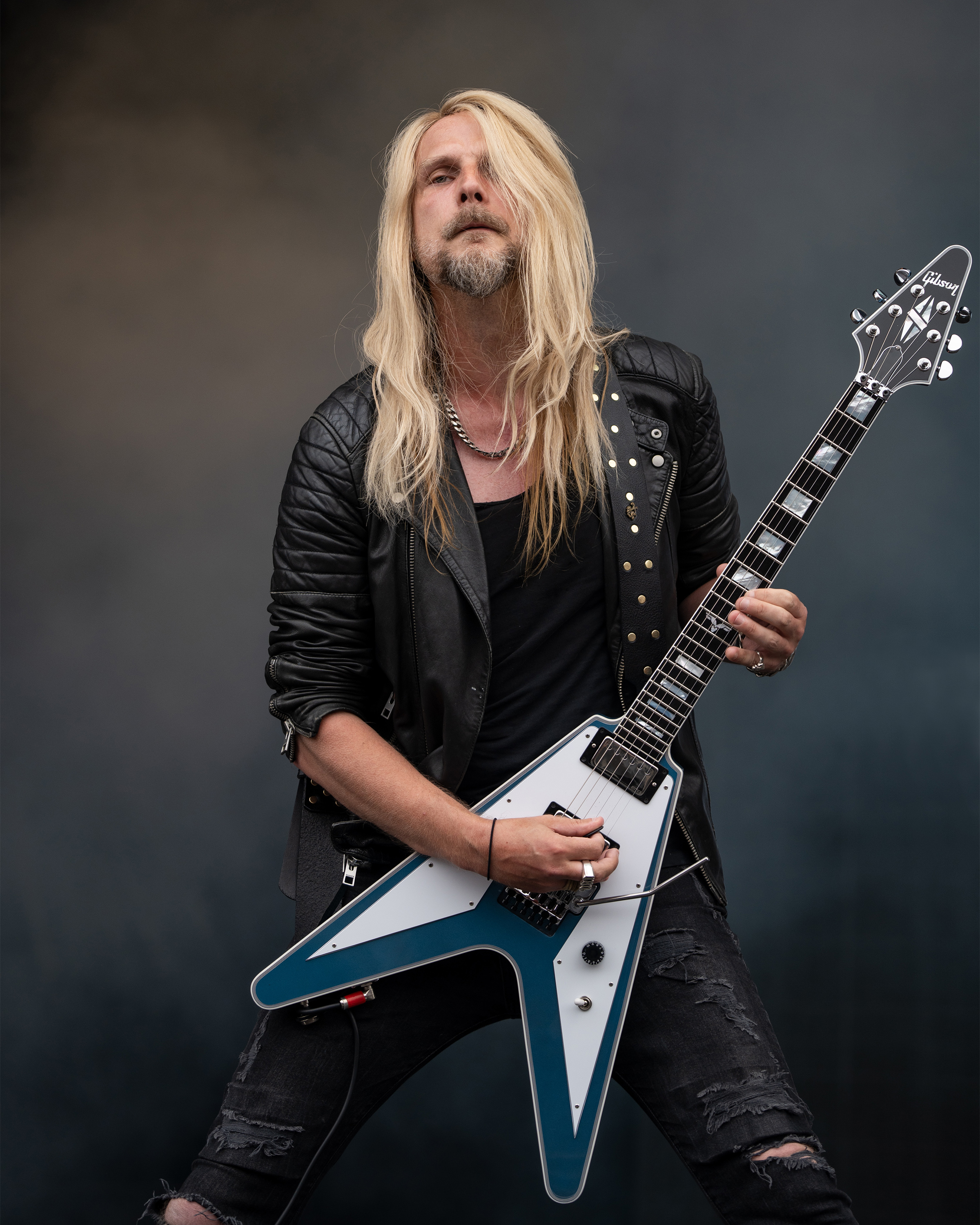
- Faulkner in 2023

Background information
- Born: Richard Ian Faulkner; 1 January 1980 (age 46); London, England
- Genres: Heavy metal; hard rock
- Occupation: Musician
- Instrument: Guitar
- Years active: 2001–present
- Member of: Judas Priest; Elegant Weapons
- Formerly of: Voodoo Six
- Website: richiefaulkner.com

Richard Ian Faulkner (born 1 January 1980) is an English guitarist best known as one of the lead guitarists for the heavy metal band Judas Priest since 2011, replacing K. K. Downing. He has also performed with Lauren Harris, Christopher Lee, Voodoo Six, Dirty Deeds, and Ace Mafia.

== Biography ==
=== Early life and career ===
Faulkner was born in London, and lived in Stockholm, Sweden, where he worked as a sausage seller between 1995 and 2000, and learned to speak Swedish while living in the country.

His inspiration to pick up a guitar was watching recordings of Jimi Hendrix's concerts at the Monterey Pop Festival in 1967 and at the Atlanta Pop Festival in 1970. Faulkner got his first guitar when he was around 7 or 8 years old. His father played guitar and was a fan of Hendrix and bands like Black Sabbath and Deep Purple, and used to show him a few chords. The first song he learned to play on guitar was The Troggs' 1966 single "Wild Thing". When Faulkner was about 13 years old, he connected with the owner of a local music shop who played in a cover band, covering material from Iron Maiden to Thin Lizzy to UFO. He asked Faulkner to play a couple of songs with him at some gigs, which was his introduction to the world of gigging.

In the early stages of his career, Faulkner played in bands such as Dirty Deeds, Voodoo Six (which he co-founded with bassist Tony Newton), Ace Mafia, Parramon, and Lauren Harris' band. His first signed band was Deeds, and their album, 2002's Blown, was produced by Iron Maiden bassist Steve Harris. With Faulkner on guitar, the Lauren Harris band was the opening act on Iron Maiden's Somewhere Back in Time World Tour in 2008. Steve Harris told Faulkner that if anything would have happened to any of his bandmates, he would have chosen Faulkner as a replacement.

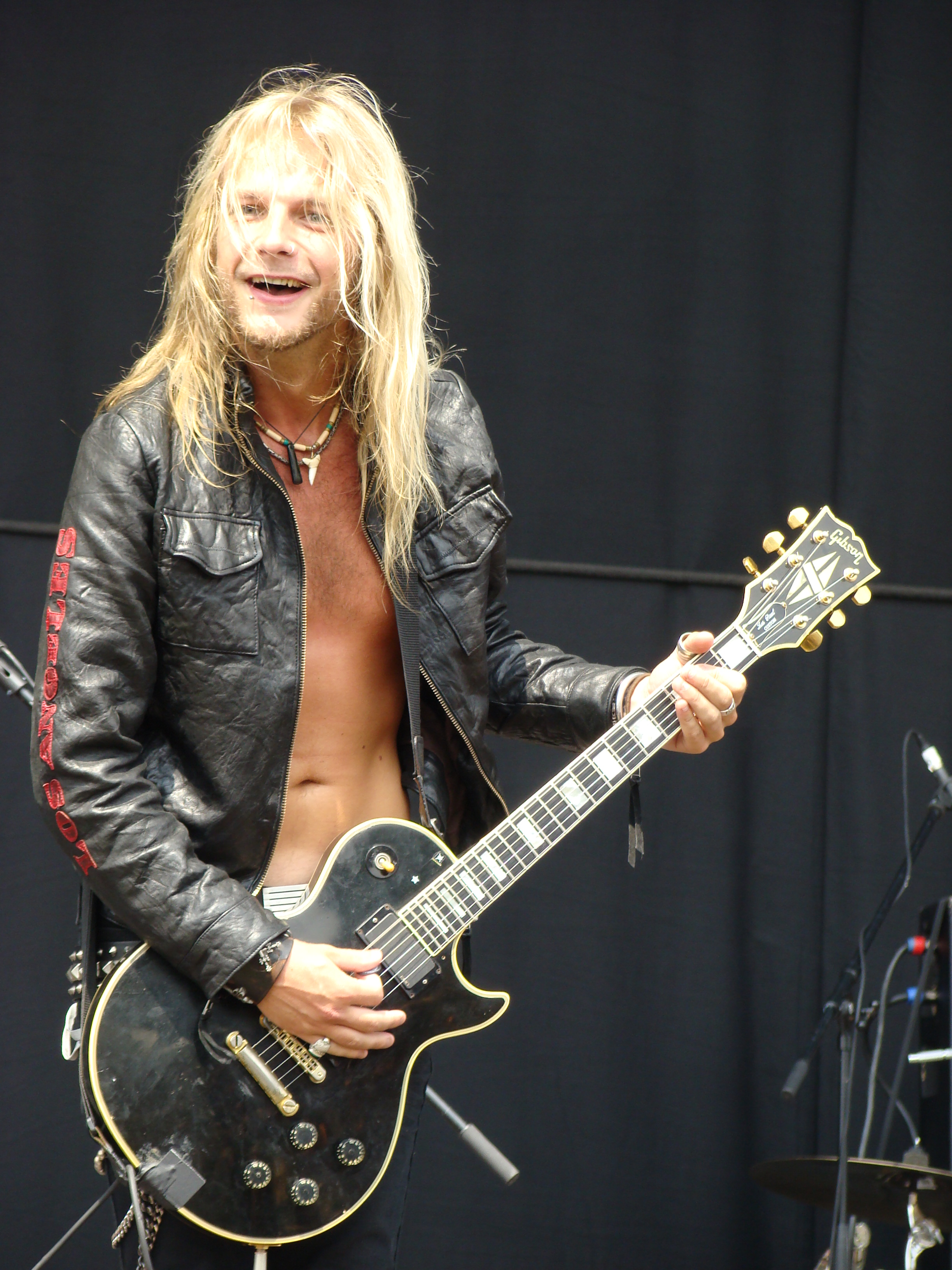
Faulkner performing in 2009

Faulkner has also arranged music for actor Christopher Lee's heavy metal album Charlemagne: The Omens of Death. Lee's team sent Faulkner some songs that were very orchestral and symphony-based and asked him to arrange them into metal songs. Both Lee and his team gave Faulkner a free creative rein for any ideas he felt the songs needed. The album was released on 27 May 2013, Lee's 91st birthday.

=== Judas Priest ===
On 20 April 2011, Faulkner was appointed as the successor of guitarist K. K. Downing in heavy metal band Judas Priest. A mutual friend, guitarist Pete Friesen, recommended him to the band. Friesen and Faulkner had played together in a cover band in London called Metalworks, which coincidentally is also the title of a Judas Priest compilation released in 1993. They called him on a wrong phone number, so they sent him two emails. Faulkner thought they were junk mail, so he deleted them. The band began to track him down and eventually got his real phone number. When Faulkner got a call from the band's management, he thought it was a joke. He went to Glenn Tipton's house the next day to meet him and Rob Halford was present as well. They had a discussion and Faulkner played a few pieces for them. They sent him a few tracks because they wanted to hear what he would play on those tracks on the solos, and they went from there. Faulkner returned about a week later and they offered him the gig. He kept it a secret for a month until the official announcement.

Faulkner's first performance with Judas Priest occurred on 25 May 2011 on the TV show American Idol, where the band performed "Living After Midnight" and "Breaking the Law" with James Durbin. Faulkner's first album with Judas Priest was Redeemer of Souls, released in 2014.

Vocalist Rob Halford and guitarist Glenn Tipton have credited Faulkner with saving Judas Priest. Halford said in a 2015 interview; "Let's face it, to some extent Richie saved Judas Priest, because if we hadn't have found him at the crucial time that we were looking for a guitar player, things could have turned out quite differently."

In 2015, Faulkner was awarded the Dimebag Darrell Shredder Award by the readers of British magazine Metal Hammer at their annual Metal Hammer Golden Gods Awards.

On 9 March 2018, Judas Priest released their second album with Faulkner, Firepower, which debuted and peaked at No. 5 on the Billboard 200 chart, becoming the band's highest charting album.

== Personal life ==
Faulkner is in a relationship with Mariah Lynch, the daughter of guitarist George Lynch. The couple's first child, a daughter, was born on 8 July 2020.

On 27 September 2021, Judas Priest had to postpone their "50 Heavy Metal Years Tour" in the United States due to Faulkner undergoing major emergency heart surgery. The band announced on social media that they will look to reschedule the tour following updates from Faulkner's doctors. In a statement shared on Judas Priest's official website on 5 October 2021, Faulkner explained that when the band was performing "Painkiller" at Louder Than Life in Kentucky on 26 September 2021, his aorta ruptured and started to spill blood into his chest cavity. Faulkner's doctor told him he had an aortic aneurysm and complete aortic dissection, which is often fatal. Faulkner was taken to a nearby hospital, The Rudd Heart & Lung Centre (which is only 4 miles away from the venue), and quickly went into what turned out to be a 10½ hour emergency open heart surgery where five parts of his heart were replaced with mechanical components. Faulkner said that this was totally unexpected for him since he had no history of a bad heart, no clogged arteries nor high cholesterol, and then urged the fans to get themselves checked.

== Influences ==
Faulkner has cited bands like Black Sabbath, Deep Purple, Thin Lizzy, Iron Maiden, Judas Priest, UFO, Rainbow, and Metallica as his early musical influences, as well as guitarists such as Jimi Hendrix, Brian May, David Gilmour, Eddie Van Halen, Dave Murray, Randy Rhoads, Zakk Wylde, Kirk Hammett, and Michael Schenker as major influences on his guitar playing.

== Equipment ==
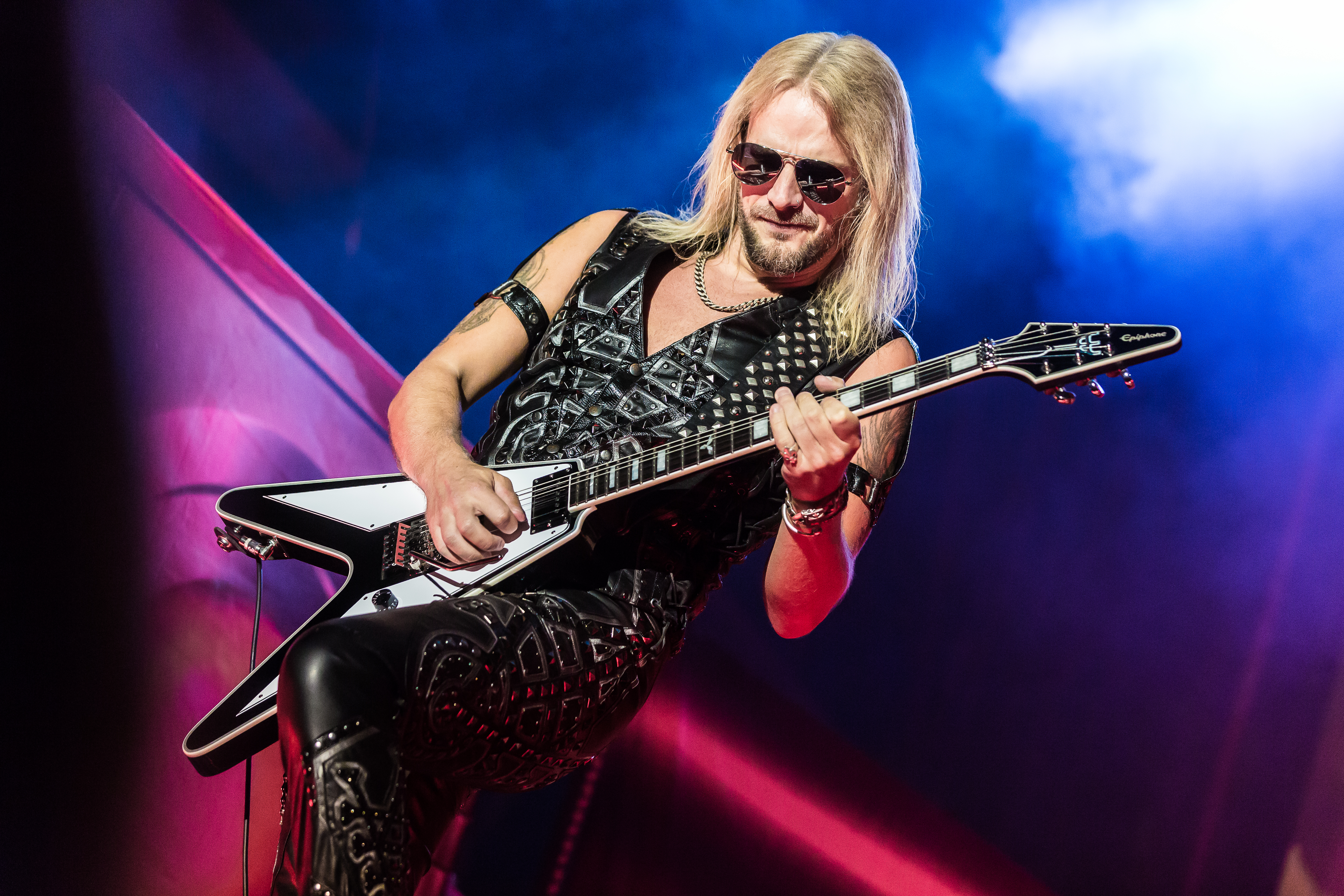
Faulkner playing his signature Epiphone Flying V guitar during a Judas Priest concert at With Full Force 2018 in Germany

Faulkner is known for his use of Gibson and Epiphone Flying V model guitars, equipped with his signature EMG 57/66 active pickups. His first Gibson was an Epiphone Flying V with locking trem. Faulkner has also used a Gibson Les Paul Custom with EMG 81/85 active pickups.

In March 2018, Epiphone released Faulkner's signature Flying V guitar.

Effects

- Voodoo Lab Ground Control Pro Programmable MIDI Foot Controller
- Dunlop JC95 Jerry Cantrell Signature Cry Baby Wah Pedal
- MXR M101 Phase 90 Phaser Pedal
- MXR M148 Micro Chorus Pedal
- Boss NS-2 Noise Suppressor Pedal
- Boss DD-7 Digital Delay Pedal
- MXR M169 Carbon Copy Analog Delay Pedal
- Boss TU-3 Chromatic Tuner Pedal with Bypass
- Electro-Harmonix Micro POG Polyphonic Octave Generator Pedal

Amplifiers

- Engl Powerball II
- ENGL cabs with Celestion Vintage 30 speakers

Strings and picks

- Ernie Ball Power Slinky strings (.011-.048)
- Dunlop strings (.011-.050)
- InTuneGP picks (2 mm)

== Discography ==
Year	Album details	Band / Artist	Notes
2002	Blown: Released: 4 September 2002; Label: EMI	Deeds	
2006	Feed My Soul: Released: 21 August 2006; Label: White Knuckle/Filthy Lucre Records	Voodoo Six	
2008	Calm Before the Storm: Released: 10 June 2008; Label: Demolition DR2 Records	Lauren Harris	
2009	Vicious Circle: Released: 9 December 2009; Independently released	Ace Mafia	EP
2013	Epitaph: Released: 28 May 2013; Label: Legacy	Judas Priest	DVD
2014	Redeemer of Souls: Released: 8 July 2014; Label: Epic / Columbia	Judas Priest	
2016	Battle Cry: Released: 25 March 2016; Label: Epic	Judas Priest	Live Album / DVD
2018	Firepower: Released: 9 March 2018; Label: Epic	Judas Priest	
2023	Horns for a Halo: Released: 26 May 2023; Label: Nuclear Blast	Elegant Weapons	
2024	Invincible Shield: Released: 6 March 2024; Label: Epic	Judas Priest	

Guest appearances

Year	Album details	Band / Artist	Notes
2010	Dead People: Released: 21 November 2010; Label: Rockline Records	Parramon	
2011	For All We Know: Released: 25 April 2011; Label: Self-released	For All We Know	Lead guitar on track 2; "Busy Being Somebody Else"
2013	Charlemagne: The Omens of Death: Released: 27 May 2013; Label: Charlemagne Productions Ltd.	Christopher Lee	Arranger 7 of 10 tracks
2013	Rise Again: Released: 14 October 2013; Label: Green China Records	Primitai	Guitar on track 2; "Scream When You See Us"
2014	Renegades: Released: 16 May 2014; Label:	Monument	Lead guitar on track 8; "Rock The Night"
2016	Electric Conjuring: Released: 1 June 2016; Label: Evil Steel Records	Iron Spell	Lead guitar on track 6; "Stormrider"
2018	Ace Mafia: Released: 15 September 2018	Ace Mafia	EP
2022	Exile: Released: 28 October 2022; Label: Weapons MFG	Demon Hunter	Lead guitar and solo on track 10; "Godless"

== Awards and nominations ==
Year	Award	Category	Result
2015	Metal Hammer Golden Gods Awards	Dimebag Darrell Shredder Award	Won
2015	Loudwire Music Awards	Guitarist of the Year	Nominated
