= Unforgiven (disambiguation) =

Unforgiven is a 1992 Western film directed by Clint Eastwood.

Unforgiven may also refer to:

== Film ==
- The Unforgiven (1960 film), a Western starring Burt Lancaster, Audrey Hepburn and Audie Murphy
- The Unforgiven (2005 film), a South Korean film
- Unforgiven (2013 film), a Japanese remake of the 1992 film starring Ken Watanabe
- Unforgiven (2018 film), a Russian film about Vitaly Kaloyev and the 2002 Überlingen mid-air collision.

== Music ==
- The Unforgiven (band), a country rock band that toured from 1985 to 1988

=== Albums ===
- Unforgiven (X-Raided album), 1999
- Unforgiven (Tim Hardin album), 1980
- Unforgiven (Cockney Rejects album), 2007
- Unforgiven (Le Sserafim album), 2023
- The Unforgiven (album), a 1999 album by Michael Schenker Group

=== Songs ===
- "The Unforgiven" (song), a 1991 song by Metallica
  - "The Unforgiven II", Metallica's sequel song to "The Unforgiven", 1998
  - "The Unforgiven III", Metallica's sequel song to "The Unforgiven" and "The Unforgiven II", 2008
- "Unforgiven" (D:Ream song), 1993
- "Unforgiven" (The Go-Go's song), 2001
- "Unforgiven" (Tracy Lawrence song), 2001
- "Unforgiven" (Sevendust song), 2018
- "Unforgiven" (Le Sserafim song), 2023
- "Unforgiven", a song by Creed from My Own Prison, 1997
- "Unforgiven," a song by Sweetbox from Jade, 2002
- "Unforgiven", a song by Fefe Dobson from Fefe Dobson, 2003
- "Unforgiven", a song by Beck from Morning Phase, 2014

== Other uses ==
- WWE Unforgiven, a former annual pay-per-view event held by WWE
- Unforgiven (TV series), a 2009 three part ITV drama starring Suranne Jones
- "Unforgiven" (Supernatural), an episode of the television series Supernatural
- "Unforgiven" (Once Upon a Time), an episode from the fourth season of the television series Once Upon a Time
- Yasuo, the Unforgiven, a character from the video game League of Legends

== See also ==
- The Unforgiving, a 2011 album by Within Temptation
