= Prime Minister Fukuda =

Prime Minister Fukuda (福田総理) may refer to one of the following Prime Ministers of Japan:

- Takeo Fukuda (1905–1995), Japanese politician
- Yasuo Fukuda (born 1936), Japanese politician

== See also ==
- Fukuda
- Takeo (disambiguation)
- Yasuo
