= Tony Newton (English musician) =

English bassist and producer

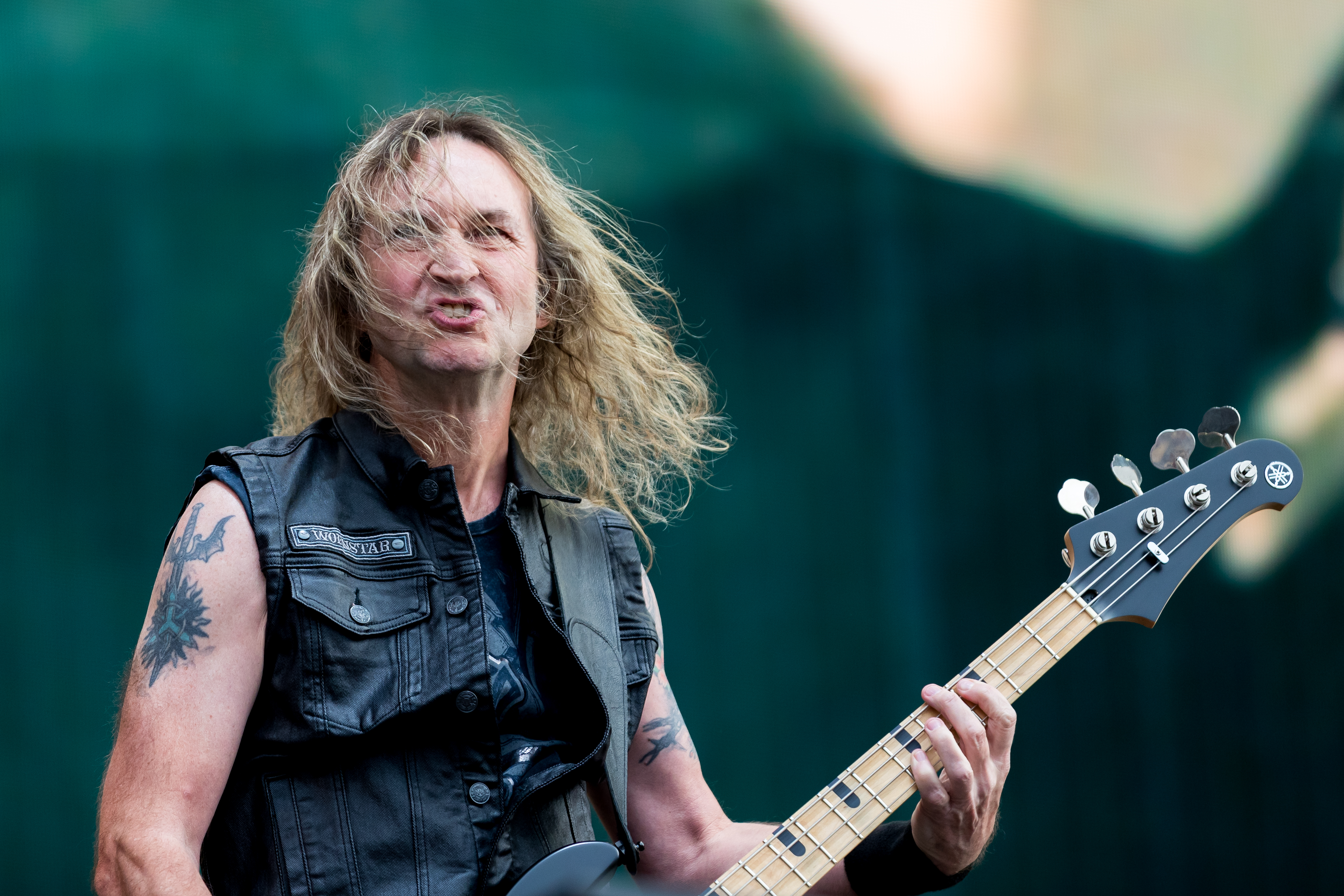
- Newton with KK's Priest in 2024

Background information
- Genres: Hard rock; heavy metal
- Occupations: Bassist; record producer
- Years active: 1990s–present
- Labels: Beast Records
- Member of: KK's Priest; Voodoo Six
- Formerly of: Dirty Deeds

Tony Newton (30 November) is an English bassist, recording engineer and record producer, most active in heavy metal and hard rock genres. He is the current bassist of KK's Priest and Voodoo Six. He has also produced and/or engineered releases from Iron Maiden and British Lion.

== Biography ==
In the 90s, Newton was bassist of a heavy metal band Dirty Deeds, with singer Pete Franklin, guitarist Barry Fitzgibbon and drummer Dave Cavill. Dirty Deeds supported UFO on their Walk On Water UK tour and Iron Maiden on their Virtual XI tour. The band were signed to Beast Records, by Iron Maiden bassist Steve Harris. They released two Real World (1999) and Danger of Infection (2002). Newton has continued his association with Harris and Iron Maiden, including engineering or producing many of their releases.

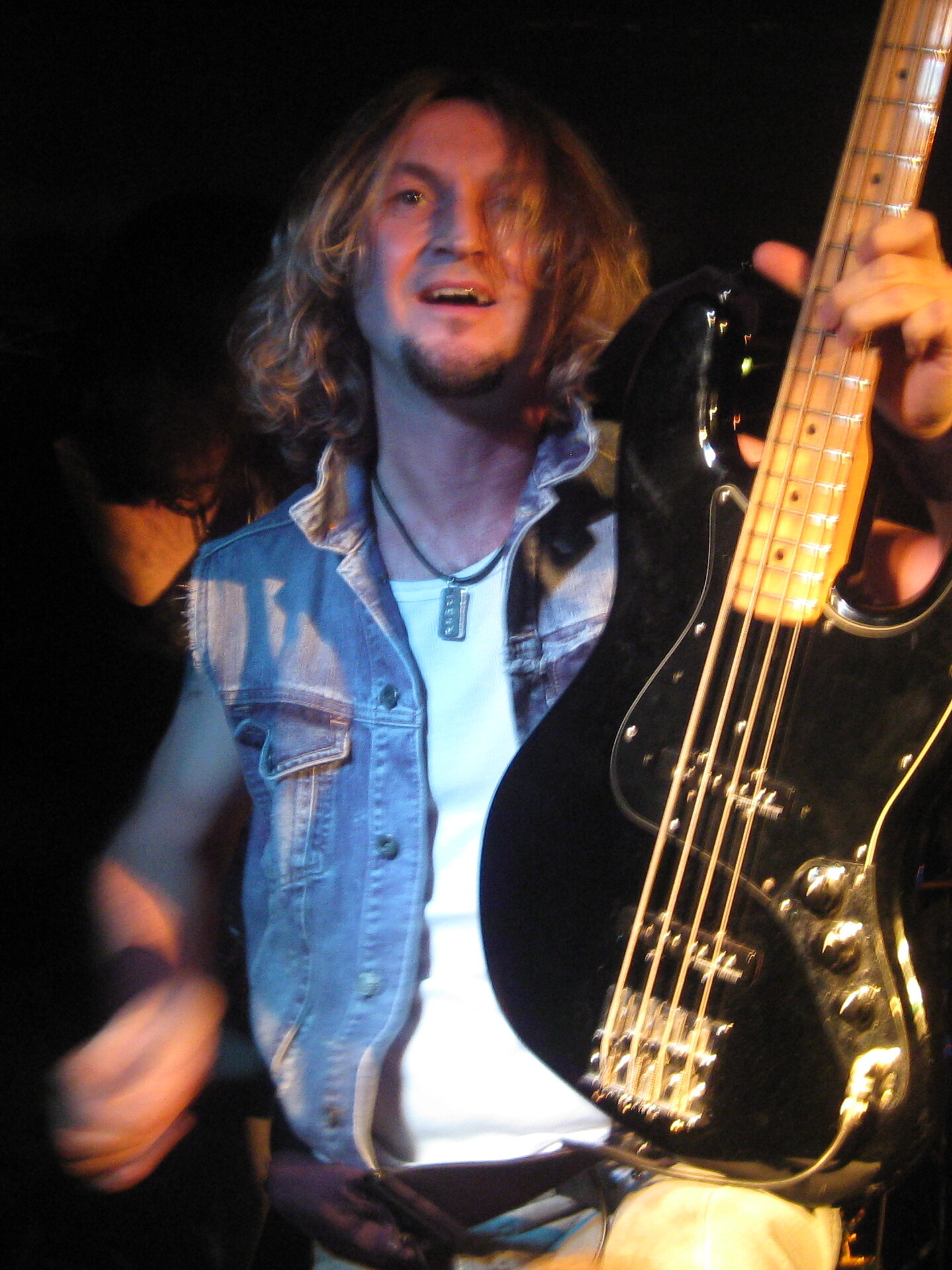
Newton with Voodoo Six in 2011

Newton, along with guitarist Richie Faulkner (who had been a member of Dirty Deeds), founded hard rock band Voodoo Six in 2003. The band's first line-up in 2005 also included drummer Dave "Grav" Cavill, vocalist Henry Rundell, and second guitarist Matt Pearce. The band released their debut album Feed My Soul in 2006, which was remixed and released as First Hit For Free in 2008. Faulkner departed Voodoo Six in 2011 to join Judas Priest. Voodoo Six have released a further four albums and two EPs and have done many tours, including supporting Iron Maiden.

In 2021 Newton became the bassist for KK's Priest, a band started by K. K. Downing, whom Faulkner had replaced in Judas Priest. Newton has played bass, mixed and engineered both of their albums to date, and toured with the band.

== Discography ==
=== Performance ===
==== With Dirty Deeds ====
- Real World (1999)
- Danger of Infection (2002)

=== Production ===
Year	Band	Title	Notes	Cite
2003	Iron Maiden	"Rainmaker"	Assistant producer on live tracks	
2010	Tank	War Machine	Drums recording	
2012	Iron Maiden	En Vivo!	Recording	
2012	Blaze Bayley	The King of Metal	Recording	
2012	Cockney Rejects	East End Babylon	Mixing and mastering	
2012	Thomas Zwijsen	Nylon Maiden	Bass recording	
2014	The Raven Age	The Raven Age	Engineering	
2014	StoneWire	When The Crow Flies	Mixing	
2016	Cockney Rejects	"It's Gonna Kick Off!"	Producer	
2017	Iron Maiden	The Book Of Souls: Live Chapter	Recording, production, engineering, mixing	
2018	Monument	Hellhound	Production mixing	
2018	Airrace	Untold Stories	Mixing	
2020	Iron Maiden	Nights of the Dead	Mixing, engineering, recording, production	
