= Sermons of the Sinner =

Studio album by KK's Priest
- Released: 1 October 2021
- Genre: Heavy metal
- Length: 50:30
- Label: EX1; Cleopatra
- Producer: K. K. Downing

KK's Priest chronology
Sermons of the Sinner (2021)	The Sinner Rides Again (2023)

Sermons of the Sinner is the debut album by English band KK's Priest, formed by former Judas Priest guitarist K. K. Downing and featuring that band's interim vocalist Tim "Ripper" Owens, released on 1 October 2021 through EX1 Records and Cleopatra Records.

== Critical reception ==
Professional ratings
Review scores
Source	Rating
Blabbermouth.net	7/10
Kerrang!	3/5
Louder	3.5/5 stars
Metal Injection	8/10

Chad Bowar of Metal Injection observed that "as you would expect", the album "is very similar to Judas Priest" with tracks that are "pretty focused". Bowar concluded that Downing has "delivered a debut album that celebrates metal's past while still looking to the future". Both Bowar and Steve Beebee of Kerrang! were critical of the length of "Metal Through and Through", with Beebee going on to say the album "feels less like an alternative and more like a supplement to Judas Priest, small variations on very similar themes. But does it rock? Holy hell, yes."

Dom Lawson of Louder described it as "a balls-out heavy metal record, not unlike the ones he used to make with that band he used to be in" and felt that "a slight air of petulance permeates this whole thing, as if the six-string legend is purposefully doing Priesty things in the Priestest way possible" by recruiting Tim "Ripper" Owens. Jay H. Gorania of Blabbermouth.net stated that while the spirit of Judas Priest "doesn't feel as though it has been rekindled as any kind of forced throw-back or cash-grab" as "the sounds are familiar, authentic and moving", "at its worst, though, KK's Priest has the feel of a Priest tribute act" but that "the obvious weak links are fortunately few and far between".

== Track listing ==
All tracks are written by K. K. Downing.

Sermons of the Sinner track listing
No.	Title	Length
1.	"Incarnation"	0:58
2.	"Hellfire Thunderbolt"	3:49
3.	"Sermons of the Sinner"	5:25
4.	"Sacerdote y Diablo"	5:35
5.	"Raise Your Fists"	4:10
6.	"Brothers of the Road"	3:22
7.	"Metal Through and Through"	8:13
8.	"Wild and Free"	4:15
9.	"Hail for the Priest"	5:44
10.	"Return of the Sentinel"	8:59
Total length:		50:30

== Personnel ==
KK's Priest

- Tim "Ripper" Owens – vocals
- K. K. Downing – guitars, production, mixing
- A.J. Mills – guitars
- Tony Newton – bass, mixing, engineering
- Sean Elg – drums

Additional personnel

- Anthony Wall – engineering
- Ade Emsley – mastering
- Andy Pilkington – artwork

== Charts ==
Chart performance for Sermons of the Sinner
Chart (2021)	Peak position
Austrian Albums (Ö3 Austria)	13
Belgian Albums (Ultratop Flanders)	118
Belgian Albums (Ultratop Wallonia)	128
Finnish Albums (Suomen virallinen lista)	11
German Albums (Offizielle Top 100)	18
Scottish Albums (OCC)	10
Spanish Albums (PROMUSICAE)	33
Swedish Albums (Sverigetopplistan)	41
Swiss Albums (Schweizer Hitparade)	12
UK Albums (OCC)	54
UK Independent Albums (OCC)	3
UK Rock & Metal Albums (OCC)	2
