= KK's Priest =

British heavy metal band

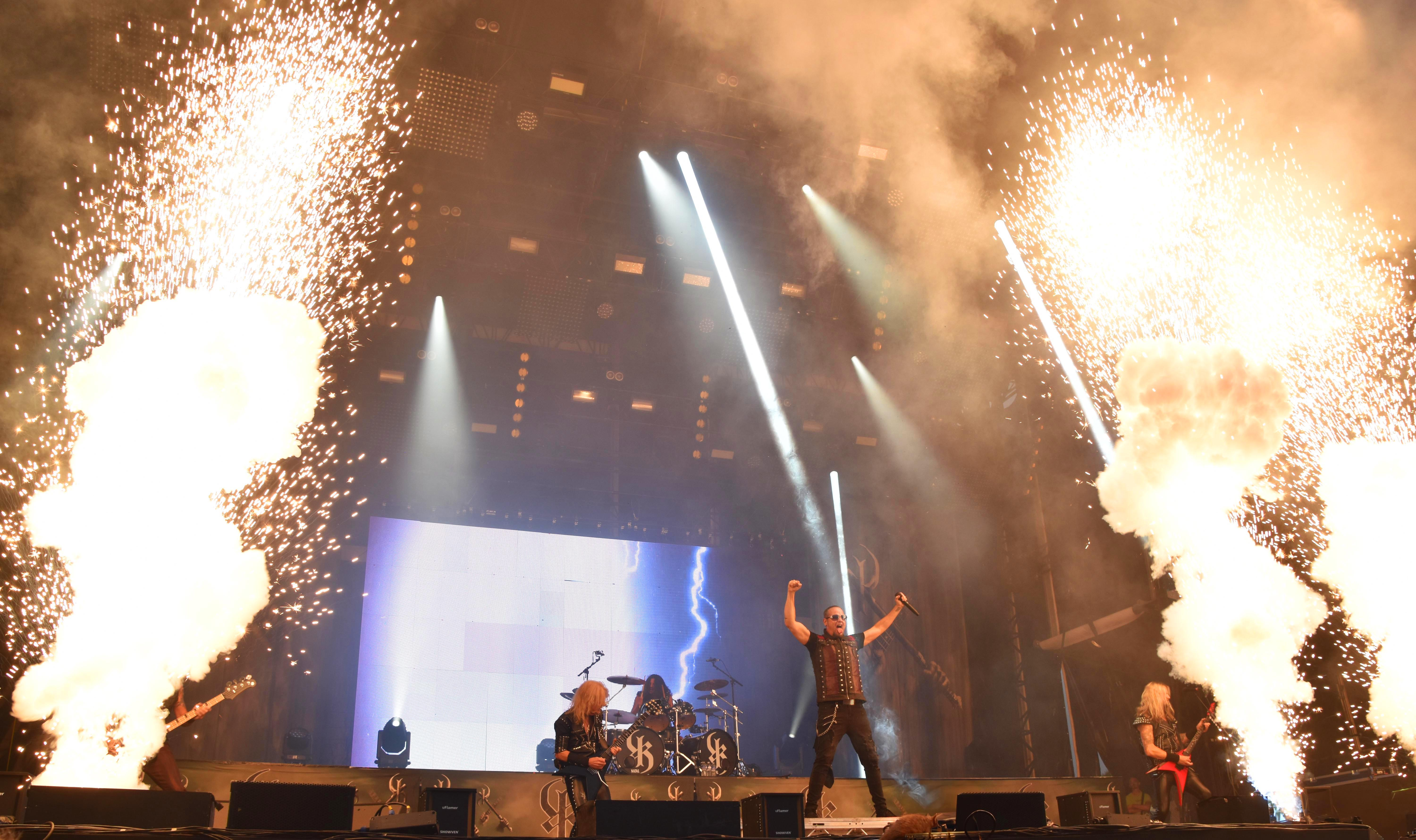
- KK's Priest in 2024

Background information
- Origin: Bridgnorth, Shropshire, England
- Genre: Heavy metal
- Years active: 2019–present
- Labels: Explorer1 Music Group; Cleopatra; Napalm
- Spinoff of: Judas Priest
- Members: K. K. Downing; Tim "Ripper" Owens; A.J. Mills; Sean Elg; Anthony Wall
- Past members: Les Binks; David Ellefson; Tony Newton
- Website: kkdowningofficial.com

KK's Priest are an English heavy metal band, formed by former Judas Priest guitarist, K. K. Downing in 2019.

== History ==
Downing left Judas Priest in 2011, citing "an on-going breakdown in working relationships between myself, elements of the band and management for some time." He did not perform live again until 2019, when he played at Bloodstock Open Air festival with former Manowar guitarist Ross the Boss. He also played a one off show in Wolverhampton on 3 November 2019, along with former Judas Priest members Tim "Ripper" Owens (vocals) and Les Binks (drums), then-current Megadeth bassist David Ellefson and Hostile guitarist A.J. Mills.

In January 2020, Downing signed with Explorer1 Music Group, which would pair him with veteran manager Andy Gould, and announced that he would work on brand-new music. The following month, it was announced that Downing had formed a new band, KK's Priest, with Mills, Owens and Binks and bassist Tony Newton.

The band's debut album Sermons of the Sinner was originally scheduled to be released on 20 August 2021, but was postponed until 1 October. A music video for the album's lead single, "Hellfire Thunderbolt", was released on 12 May 2021. However, Binks did not appear on the album as a result of a wrist injury and was replaced by Cage drummer Sean Elg. Later, Binks would occasionally perform live with KK's Priest.

When speaking to KNAC in June 2021 about Sermons of the Sinner, Downing said that he was already at work on material for the next album, which would be more of a collaboration effort than the first album. In 2023, KK's Priest released their second album The Sinner Rides Again.

== Band members ==
KK's Priest performing in Malta, 14 October 2023

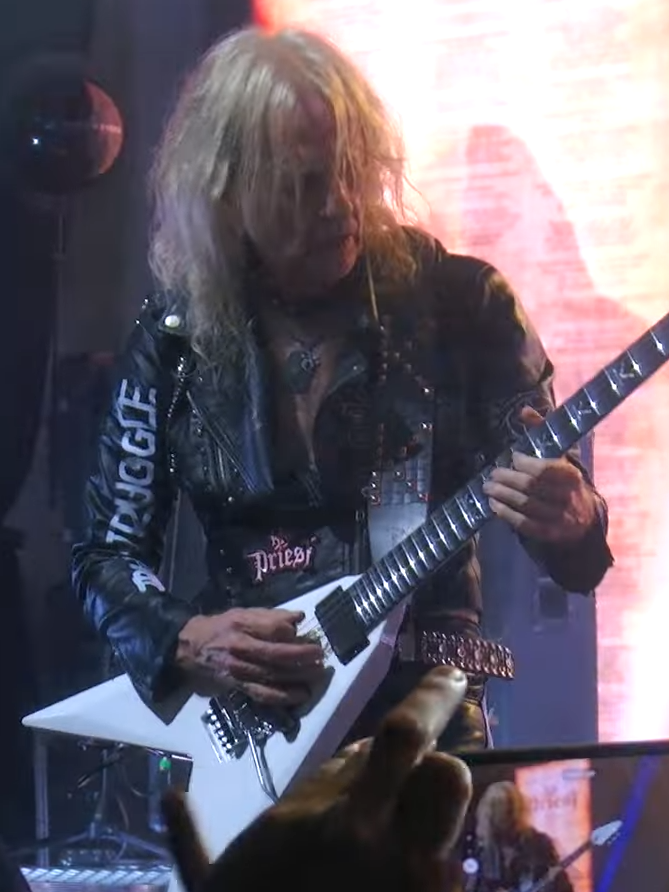
Downing

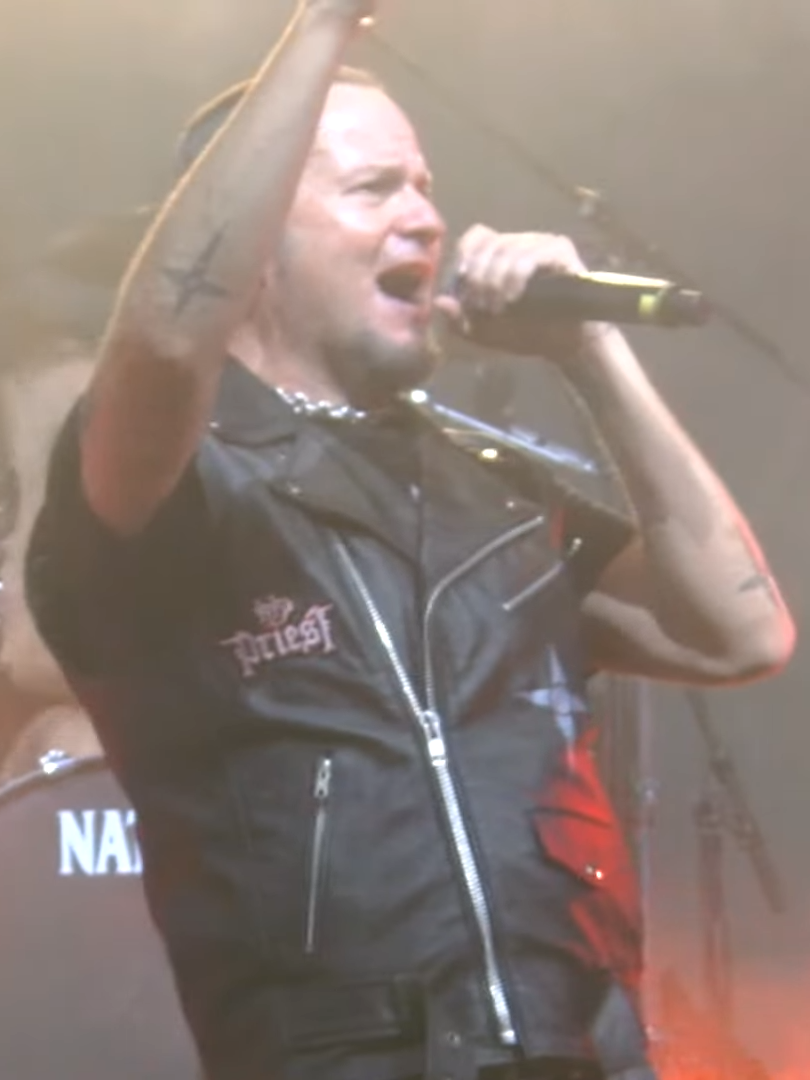
Owens

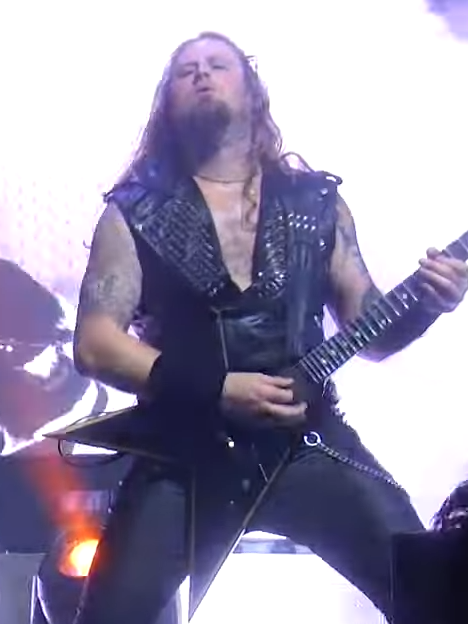
Mills

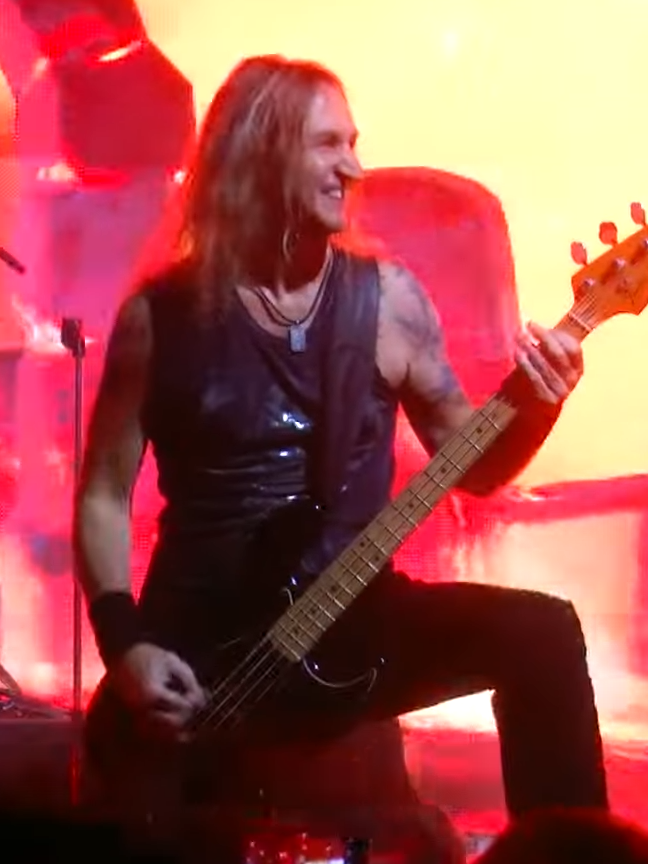
Newton

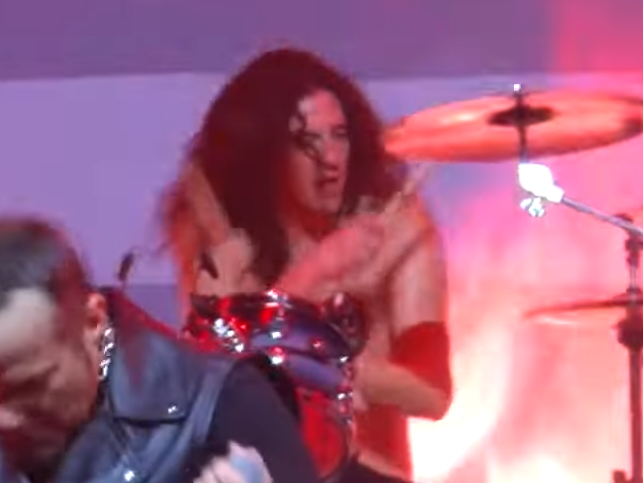
Elg

=== Current members ===
- K. K. Downing – guitars (2019–present)
- Tim "Ripper" Owens – lead vocals (2019–present)
- A.J. Mills – guitars, backing vocals (2019–present)
- Sean Elg – drums (2021–present)
- Anthony Wall — bass, backing vocals (2026–present)

=== Former members ===
- Les Binks – drums (2019–2021; died 2025)
- David Ellefson – bass, backing vocals (2019–2020)
- Tony Newton — bass, backing vocals (2020–2026)

== Discography ==
Studio albums

- Sermons of the Sinner (2021)
- The Sinner Rides Again (2023)

Singles

- "Hellfire Thunderbolt" (2021)
- "Sermons of the Sinner" (2021)
- "Brothers of the Road" (2021)
- "Raise Your Fists" (2021)
- “One More Shot at Glory” (2023)
- "Reap the Whirlwind" (2023)
- “Strike of the Viper” (2023)
