= The Sinner Rides Again =

Studio album by KK's Priest
- Released: 29 September 2023
- Genre: Heavy metal
- Length: 40:28
- Label: Napalm
- Producer: K. K. Downing

KK's Priest chronology
Sermons of the Sinner (2021)	The Sinner Rides Again (2023)

The Sinner Rides Again is the second studio album by English band KK's Priest, formed by former Judas Priest guitarist K. K. Downing. It was released on 29 September 2023 through Napalm Records. Four singles preceded the album, including the lead single "One More Shot at Glory".

== Critical reception ==
Professional ratings
Review scores
Source	Rating
Blabbermouth.net	8.5/10
Classic Rock	2/5 stars

Dom Lawson, reviewing the album for Blabbermouth.net, wrote that "it helps that like its predecessor, The Sinner Rides Again is an absolutely ripping metal record, with a huge, gleaming production job and performances that crackle with passion and intensity". Lawson singled out the vocal performance of Tim "Ripper" Owens as "his partnership with Downing takes him to new heights here".

Geoff Barton of Classic Rock called The Sinner Rides Again "all grinding desperation and lank-haired perspiration. There's no light and shade, only doom and demolition. If you're gonna get mauled by a lion, at least make it interesting." He went on to remark that the album is "so one-dimensional that one begins to question the very existence of the Spider-Verse".

The Metal Voice.com ranked The Sinner Rides Again best metal album of 2023

== Track listing ==
All tracks are written by K. K. Downing, except "Strike of the Viper" and "Wash Away Your Sins" composed by Downing and A.J. Mills.

The Sinner Rides Again track listing
No.	Title	Length
1.	"Sons of the Sentinel"	4:11
2.	"Strike of the Viper"	2:24
3.	"Reap the Whirlwind"	3:34
4.	"One More Shot at Glory"	4:27
5.	"Hymn 66"	4:35
6.	"The Sinner Rides Again"	4:40
7.	"Keeper of the Graves"	5:41
8.	"Pledge Your Souls"	4:28
9.	"Wash Away Your Sins"	6:28
Total length:		40:28

== Personnel ==
KK's Priest

- Tim "Ripper" Owens – vocals
- K. K. Downing – guitars, production, recording, engineering
- A.J. Mills – guitars
- Tony Newton – bass, recording, engineering
- Sean Elg – drums

Additional personnel

- Anthony Wall – recording, engineering
- Jacob Hansen – mastering
- John K. – orchestral & choral arrangements
- Mind Art Visual – photo
- Andy Pilkington – artwork

== Charts ==
Chart performance for The Sinner Rides Again
Chart (2023)	Peak position
Belgian Albums (Ultratop Flanders)	51
Belgian Albums (Ultratop Wallonia)	164
Finnish Albums (Suomen virallinen lista)	39
German Albums (Offizielle Top 100)	11
Japanese Albums (Oricon)	48
Japanese Hot Albums (Billboard Japan)	51
Polish Albums (ZPAV)	31
Scottish Albums (Official Charts)	21
UK Album Downloads (Official Charts)	26
UK Independent Albums (Official Charts)	12
UK Rock & Metal Albums (Official Charts)	5
