= Maiden England World Tour =

2012–2014 concert tour by Iron Maiden

- World tour by Iron Maiden
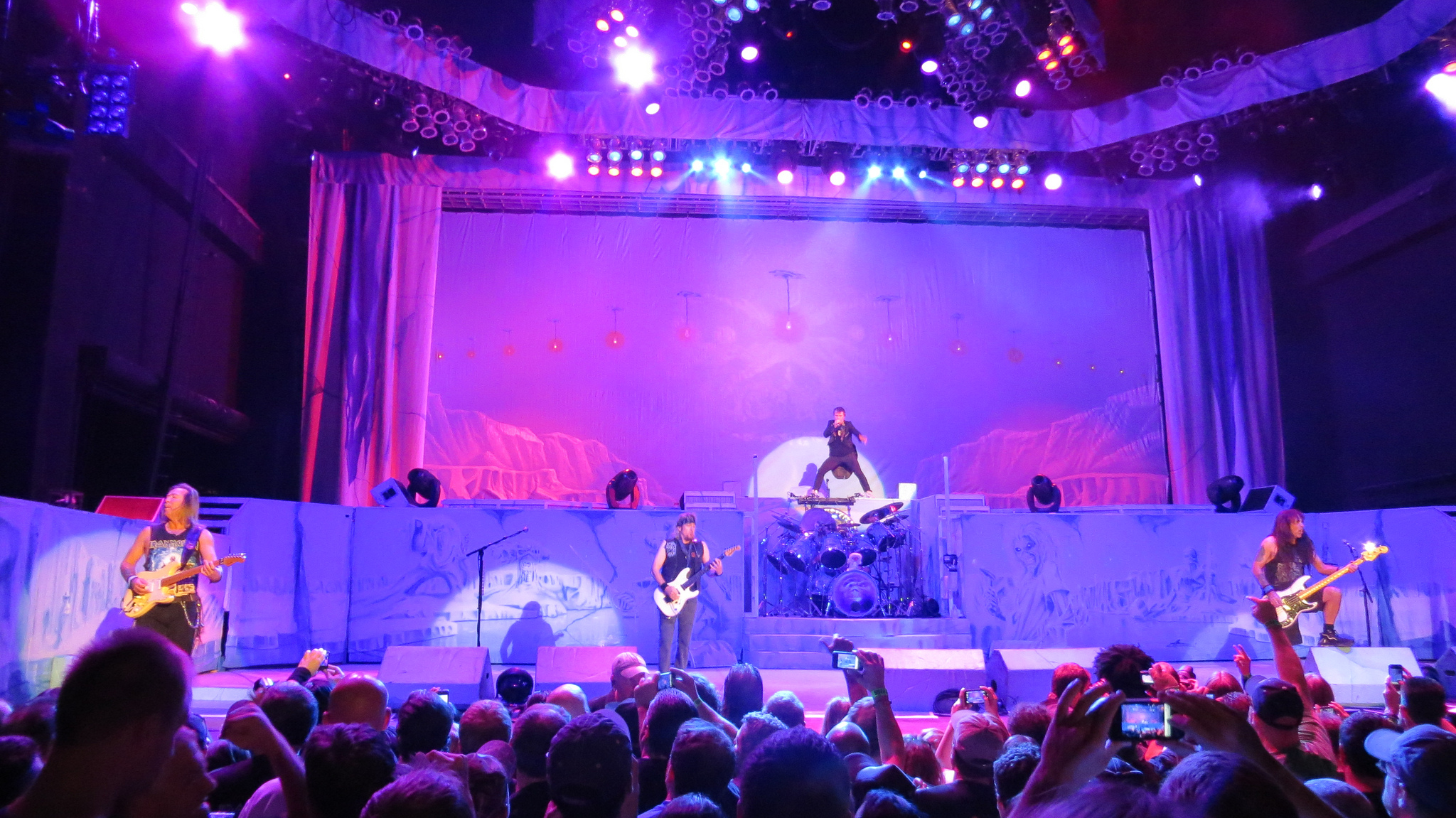
- Iron Maiden performing live in Greenwood Village, Colorado on 13 August 2012
- Location: Europe; North America; South America
- Associated album: Seventh Son of a Seventh Son
- Start date: 21 June 2012
- End date: 5 July 2014
- Legs: 5
- No. of shows: 100
- Box office: US$69,243,543 (from 58 shows)

Iron Maiden concert chronology
- The Final Frontier World Tour (2010–2011); Maiden England World Tour (2012–2014); The Book of Souls World Tour (2016–2017)

The Maiden England World Tour was a concert tour by the English heavy metal band Iron Maiden, which began on 21 June 2012 in Charlotte, North Carolina and ended on 5 July 2014 with a performance at the Sonisphere Festival at Knebworth, UK. The tour's setlist was largely based on the original 1989 concert video of the same name, shot during the Seventh Tour of a Seventh Tour in 1988, which was re-released in 2013. Because of this, the tour's setlist consisted almost entirely of the band's 1980s material, with a particular focus on their 1988 album, Seventh Son of a Seventh Son. The stage show was also based on the original tour and featured numerous pyrotechnic effects in addition to multiple appearances by the band's mascot, Eddie. Following 2005's Eddie Rips Up the World Tour and 2008–2009's Somewhere Back in Time World Tour, this was the group's third tour inspired by a particular period of their history.

The opening section of the world tour took place in North America from June to August 2012. With 34 dates in its opening leg, this was Iron Maiden's most extensive tour of North America in over 12 years and was subject to critical and commercial success. In 2013, the band continued the tour with worldwide dates, encompassing Europe and North and South America, before concluding in 2014 with a final European leg. Over three years, 100 shows were undertaken in 32 countries before an estimated audience of over 2,5 million people. Throughout the tour, consistent praise was received from music critics, with the band's performances and the stage show receiving particular acclaim. From the 58 performances tallied by Billboard magazine, the group grossed US$69,243,543 in box office revenue.

The tour featured a number of notable performances from the band, with the South American leg including their third show at the Rock in Rio festival in Brazil and their first concert in Paraguay. During their 2013 European leg, they became the first rock group to confirm an appearance at Stockholm's national stadium, Friends Arena, which sold out in record-setting time. In addition, Iron Maiden returned to Download Festival for their record-breaking fifth headline concert at Donington Park, 25 years after their first show at the venue during 1988's Seventh Tour of a Seventh Tour. To mark the occasion, the band's set began with a Spitfire flyover, an event which was mirrored at the tour's final concert at Knebworth, which was preceded by a First World War air display, organised and featuring vocalist Bruce Dickinson.

== Background ==
The tour was officially announced with a press release on 15 February 2012, which stated that the shows would be based around the 1989 video of the same name, which bassist Steve Harris later reported would be re-released in the first half of 2013. On 12 February 2013, the band announced that the original concert footage would be released on DVD, CD and LP under the title Maiden England '88 on 25 March. It was Iron Maiden's third concert tour to take a retrospective look at a particular period in the group's history, following 2005's Eddie Rips Up the World Tour and 2008–2009's Somewhere Back in Time World Tour, with Dickinson confirming that it would be the band's last to do so in December 2013.

In addition to the 29 dates included in the tour's first press release, the band went on to announce festival appearances at Milwaukee's Summerfest, Cadott's Rock Fest, and Ottawa Bluesfest, as well as a concert in Sacramento, California, and an extra night in Irvine, California. With 34 dates in its first leg, this was the band's most extensive North American tour in over a decade. In their list of the Top 200 North American Tours of 2012, Pollstar revealed that, from 30 shows, Iron Maiden sold 285,866 tickets and grossed US$16.1 million.

Following the 2012 tour of the United States and Canada, the tour continued with worldwide shows in 2013, as confirmed in the band's initial announcement. Speaking to Kerrang! in August 2012, Steve Harris confirmed that the band still intended to extend the tour into 2013, during which they will "be doing European festivals and all kinds of other stuff." On 20 September, the band disclosed that they would be performing at Download Festival on 15 June 2013, marking their record-breaking fifth headline appearance at Donington Park 25 years after their first concert at the venue which they headlined in 1988 where Monsters of Rock was originally held. To commemorate this, their show began with a flypast by a Spitfire TE311 from the Battle of Britain Memorial Flight aerial display group, which is based at RAF Coningsby.

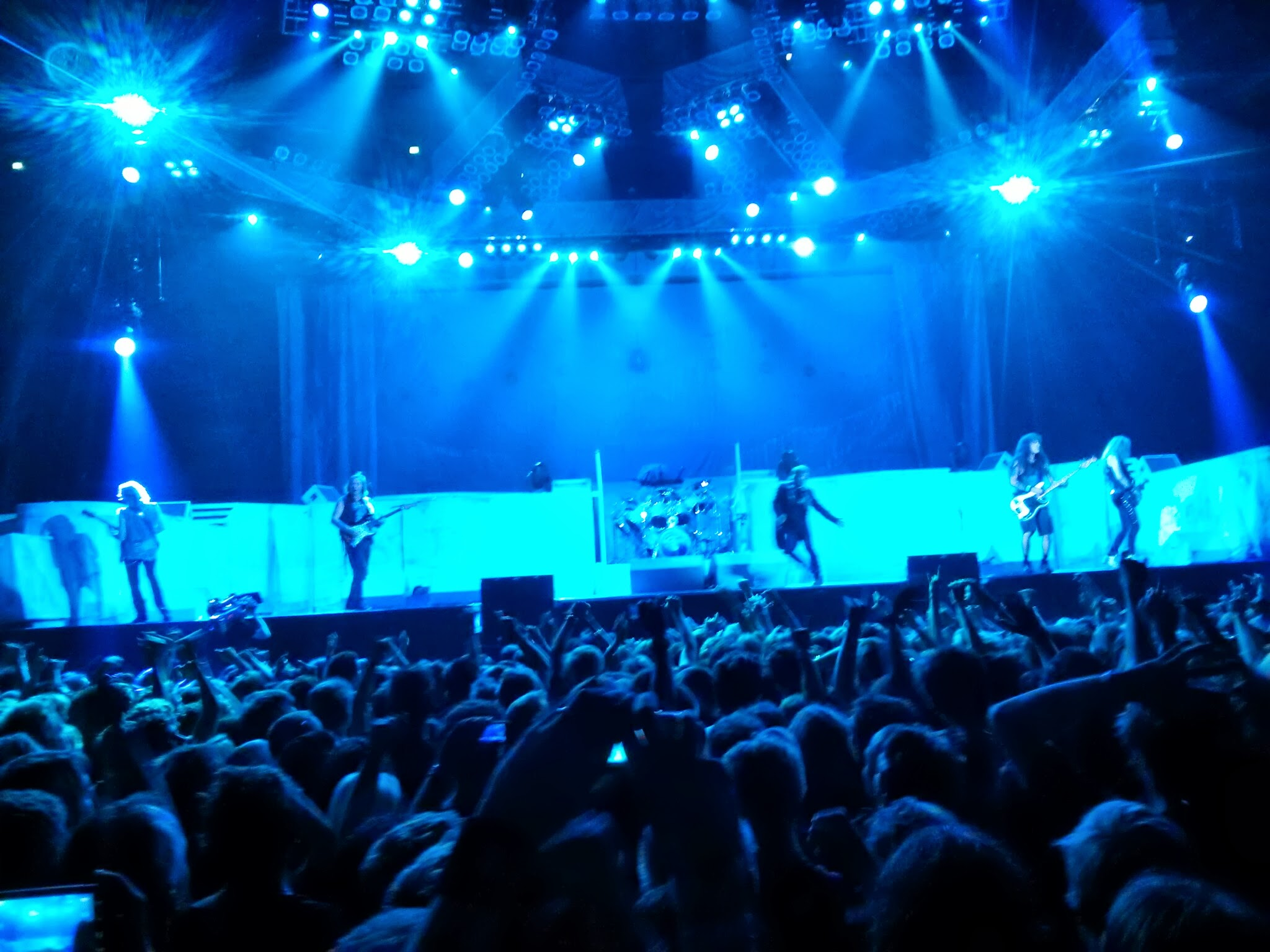
Iron Maiden performing at Friends Arena, Stockholm. 50,000 of the concert's tickets sold out in 49 minutes.

On 25 September, Iron Maiden became the first rock band to confirm a performance at Stockholm's national stadium, Friends Arena. The concert sold out in record-breaking time, with Wales Online reporting that 50,000 tickets were sold in 49 minutes. Following the performance in Stockholm, Aftonbladet reported that hundreds of fans were demanding their money back, citing poor sound quality during the concert. After a complaint was filed with the Swedish National Board for Consumer Complaints, Live Nation, the concert's promoter, conducted an investigation and decided not to offer a refund, arguing that "sound experience during a concert is [a] subjective judgement". A local sound engineer, Linnéa Carell, commented that Friends Arena is extremely unsuitable for concerts, as the stadium's design causes the sound to echo badly.

From October 2012 to March 2013, the band revealed dates in Paris, Germany, Malmö, Sweden, Amsterdam, Zurich, Poland, Russia, Lisbon, Helsinki, Prague, Zagreb, Bilbao, Bucharest, and Istanbul. During the group's appearance at Donington, Dickinson announced that the 2013 European leg would conclude with a concert in London, although an additional performance was confirmed after the initial show sold out in 12 minutes. As previously stated by Harris, the band also headlined several European festivals, with appearances made at Graspop Metal Meeting in Dessel, Belgium, Seerock festival in Graz, Austria, Topfest in Piešťany, Slovakia, and Sonisphere Festival shows in Amnéville, France, Milan, Madrid and Barcelona.

On 16 October 2012, Iron Maiden revealed that, following the 2013 European leg, they would take the Maiden England World Tour to South America with a performance at the Rock in Rio festival in Rio de Janeiro, Brazil. Further South American dates in Buenos Aires, Santiago, São Paulo, Curitiba and Asunción, which marked their debut appearance in Paraguay, were announced in April. The São Paulo show, originally slated to take place at the Jockey Club, had to be moved to Anhembi Arena due to sound restrictions at the original venue. In April, the band also announced that, prior to the South American leg, they would play seven US shows, which included headlining a special event at San Bernardino, entitled "The Battle of San Bernardino", which was immediately followed by a concert in Mexico City. Santiago, the final date of the 2013 tour, reportedly attracted 60,105 fans, which local newspaper La Tercera cited as "the largest audience by a British band ever [in Chile]". Overall, the group played 46 concerts in 2013 to an estimated attendance of 1.2 million. In their list of the Top 100 worldwide tours of 2013, Pollstar revealed that, from 34 of their shows that year, the band sold 705,250 tickets and grossed US$46.8 million.

On 2 December 2013, Iron Maiden announced that the tour would finish with a number of European shows in the summer of 2014, encompassing previously confirmed dates at the Rock am Ring and Rock im Park festivals in Germany, with the final concert taking place at Sonisphere Knebworth on 5 July. This was followed throughout December 2013 by the disclosure of a number of festival dates, including Hellfest in Clisson, France, Greenfield Festival in Interlaken, Switzerland, Nova Rock Festival in Nickelsdorf, Austria, FortaRock Festival in Nijmegen, Netherlands, Bråvalla Festival in Norrköping, Sweden, Copenhell in Copenhagen, Denmark, Rock in Idro in Bologna, Italy, and Main Square Festival in Arras, France. Throughout February and March 2014, the band announced arena shows in Sofia, Bulgaria, Budapest, Hungary, Brno, Czech Republic Esch-sur-Alzette, Luxembourg, Poznań, Poland, Belgrade, Serbia, Barcelona and Bilbao, Spain, and an appearance at the Bergen Calling festival in Norway. On 4 March, the group's Luxembourg concert was moved to Herchesfeld, the Rock-A-Field Festival Ground, in Roeser, after tickets at the initial venue sold out in less than two hours. On 29 May, it was announced that a portion of the revenue from the band's Belgrade concert would be donated to the relief effort following the 2014 Southeast Europe floods. Following the Spitfire flypast which preceded their performance at Download festival the previous year, Dickinson, piloting a Fokker Dr.I, joined the Great War Display Team in a "dogfight tribute" in honour of the First World War's 100th anniversary, which took place above the Sonisphere Knebworth site prior to Iron Maiden's appearance at the festival. Overall, the tour saw the band perform 100 shows in 32 countries, with a reported attendance of over 2 million people.

== Production ==
=== Song selection and rehearsal ===
In the original press release announcing the tour, Bruce Dickinson confirmed that the band intended to perform "about two thirds of the original track list of Maiden England" along with "other favourites". When asked why the band had chosen to focus on this specific period, guitarist Adrian Smith explained that they "thought it'd be fun to revisit that period in time... It's just great revisiting some of the songs we haven't played for a long while. It keeps us fresh", while Steve Harris stated that "We just felt like that's what we wanted to do. We do what we think is right and that's it. We'll never put a census out." Drummer Nicko McBrain explained that "After [2010's] The Final Frontier, we took a backseat to recording records and asked what can we do on tour. We put our heads together and thought of the [1988] Seventh Son [of a Seventh Son] album. It's a great album and a lot of kids into the band haven't seen some of these songs live. So it was decided that we revisit that." Although the setlist consisted entirely of songs released at least 20 years earlier, Smith affirms that "We've never been a nostalgia band. It's a way for the fans to hear the songs again. I don't see anything wrong with that."

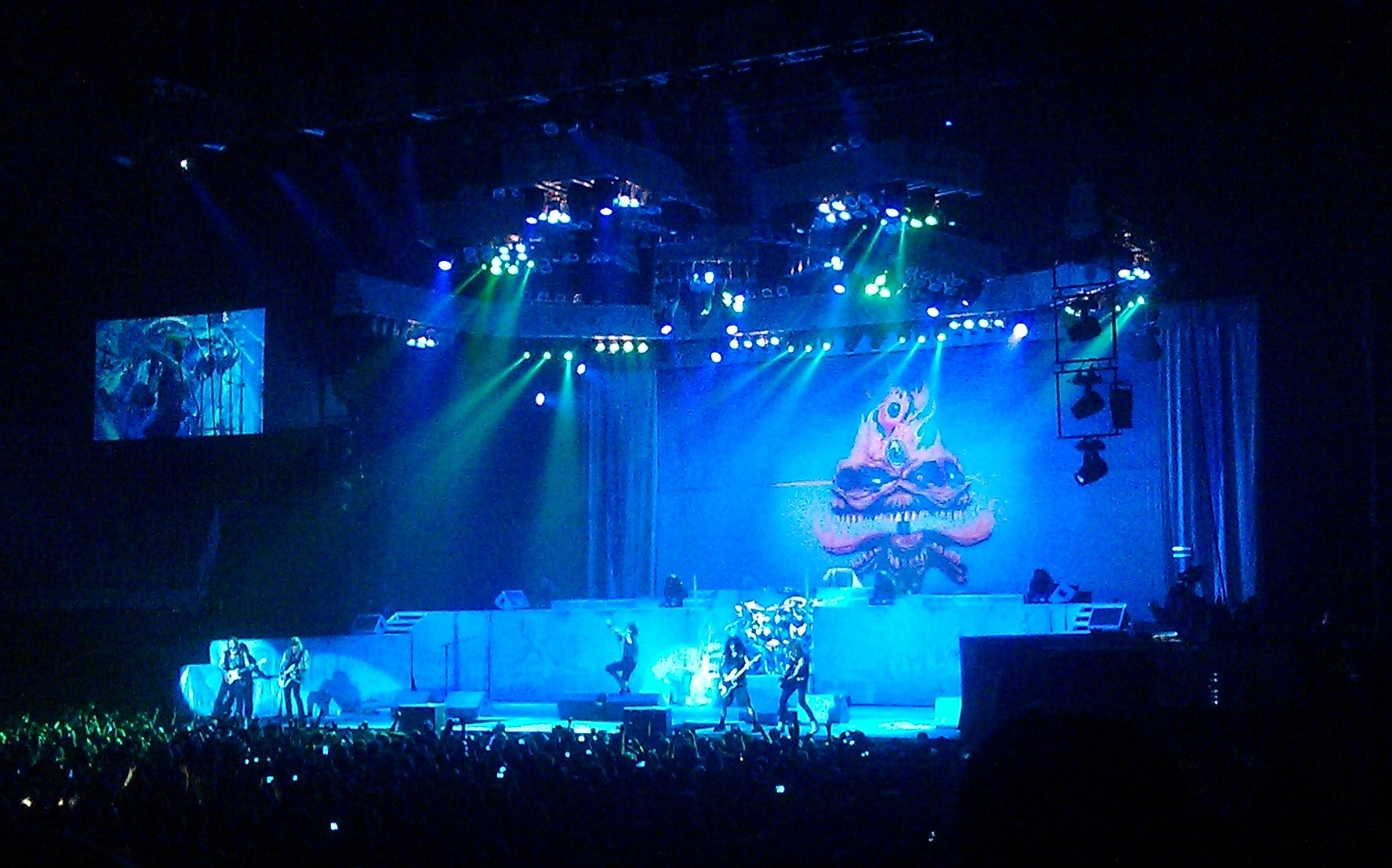
Iron Maiden performing "The Clairvoyant" in London, which was amongst the songs which featured on the original Maiden England video.

According to Harris, the band were certain of "around 75 percent" of the tour's setlist before they began rehearsing, during which they "got a better feel for which ones would really work well live". In regards to some tracks that were not included in the Maiden England video but which the band had decided to play anyway, Smith explained that including "Phantom of the Opera" (from 1980's Iron Maiden) was someone else's suggestion and "actually fits in great", while, speaking about material from 1992's Fear of the Dark, he stated that "Afraid to Shoot Strangers" offered "a nice contrast to what else is going on" while "Fear of the Dark" "has become quite a cornerstone of the set."

Smith stated that relearning "Seventh Son of a Seventh Son" (from the 1988 album of the same name) "was a bit of a handful ... the more we rehearsed it the more the little bits that were sticking needed work. It took quite a bit of work to get it right; it's more of a piece of music rather than a song", while rehearsing "The Prisoner" (from 1982's The Number of the Beast) and "The Clairvoyant" (from Seventh Son of a Seventh Son) was "pretty straightforward." McBrain reports that the band spent "a couple days' rehearsal" going over regularly played tracks, while other songs, such as "Seventh Son of a Seventh Son" and "Afraid to Shoot Strangers", which had not been performed for some time, required going over "with a fine-tooth comb." McBrain also stated that, in order to relearn certain pieces, he watched the Maiden England video again and came to realise that they could not perform those songs "at that speed today and make it work", as they have become "more refined with where we go with the tempos now." "Infinite Dreams" was rehearsed but was replaced by "Afraid to Shoot Strangers" according to the Iron Maiden Fan Club site where several members ran into manager Rod Smallwood after the second show in Atlanta and questioned the set list. It was claimed Rod stated that "the band weren't really feeling it and decided to go with something different."

=== Set list ===
In addition to Dickinson's statement that the band would play "about two thirds" of the Maiden England track list, several other songs in the band's setlist were revealed prior to the tour's commencement. During an interview with Rockline on 11 June 2012, guitarists Adrian Smith and Dave Murray announced that they would play "Seventh Son of a Seventh Son" and "The Prisoner", while Smith stated on an episode of That Metal Show that they would "probably play most of" the Seventh Son of a Seventh Son album. An interview with Adrian Smith published by The Aquarian Weekly on 20 June confirmed that the band would also perform "Can I Play with Madness" (from Seventh Son of a Seventh Son) and "Aces High" (from 1984's Powerslave).

Harris highlighted "The Prisoner" and "Seventh Son of a Seventh Son" as his favourite songs to play from the tour as "they're such epic songs and we haven't played them live for so long", while Smith stated that "the atmosphere ["Seventh Son of a Seventh Son"] creates live is really cool. It's great to be playing that one again." In addition, Harris emphasised "fan favourites" such as "Run to the Hills", "The Number of the Beast" (both from The Number of the Beast) and "Can I Play with Madness" "as the crowd reaction is so intense. It's electrifying."

Overall, this was the first Iron Maiden tour since 1991, 1998 and 1988 in which "The Prisoner", "Afraid to Shoot Strangers" and "Seventh Son of a Seventh Son" were played respectively. It was also notable for being the band's first tour in which "Hallowed Be Thy Name" (from The Number of the Beast) was not played since its release. Throughout the tour, Nick Ingman and Terry Devine-King's "Rising Mercury" served as the intro music. As with all past performances of the song, "Aces High" was preceded by Winston Churchill's We shall fight on the beaches speech, although this was the first time that the song wasn't played as a show opener.

2012/2013 Setlist
- "Rising Mercury"
1. "Moonchild" (from Seventh Son of a Seventh Son, 1988)
2. "Can I Play with Madness" (from Seventh Son of a Seventh Son, 1988)
3. "The Prisoner" (from The Number of the Beast, 1982)
4. "2 Minutes to Midnight" (from Powerslave, 1984)
5. "Afraid to Shoot Strangers" (from Fear of the Dark, 1992)
6. "The Trooper" (from Piece of Mind, 1983)
7. "The Number of the Beast" (from The Number of the Beast, 1982)
8. "Phantom of the Opera" (from Iron Maiden, 1980)
9. "Run to the Hills" (from The Number of the Beast, 1982)
10. "Wasted Years" (from Somewhere in Time, 1986)
11. "Seventh Son of a Seventh Son" (from Seventh Son of a Seventh Son, 1988)
12. "The Clairvoyant" (from Seventh Son of a Seventh Son, 1988)
13. "Fear of the Dark" (from Fear of the Dark, 1992)
14. "Iron Maiden" (from Iron Maiden, 1980)

Encore

- "Churchill's Speech"
1. "Aces High" (from Powerslave, 1984)
2. "The Evil That Men Do" (from Seventh Son of a Seventh Son, 1988)
3. "Running Free" (from Iron Maiden, 1980)

Notes:

- On the opening night in Charlotte, "Phantom of the Opera" was preceded by the intro to Bach's Toccata and Fugue in D minor, BWV 565. This was not used in subsequent shows.

In the press release announcing the tour's 2014 European leg, Dickinson revealed that the band would alter the setlist to be more representative of the group's entire 1980's output. "Afraid to Shoot Strangers", "The Clairvoyant" and "Running Free" (from 1980's Iron Maiden) were replaced by "Revelations" (from 1983's Piece of Mind), "Wrathchild" (from 1981's Killers) and "Sanctuary" (from Iron Maiden) respectively.

2014 Setlist
- "Rising Mercury"
1. "Moonchild" (from Seventh Son of a Seventh Son, 1988)
2. "Can I Play with Madness" (from Seventh Son of a Seventh Son, 1988)
3. "The Prisoner" (from The Number of the Beast, 1982)
4. "2 Minutes to Midnight" (from Powerslave, 1984)
5. "Revelations" (from Piece of Mind, 1983)
6. "The Trooper" (from Piece of Mind, 1983)
7. "The Number of the Beast" (from The Number of the Beast, 1982)
8. "Phantom of the Opera" (from Iron Maiden, 1980)
9. "Run to the Hills" (from The Number of the Beast, 1982)
10. "Wasted Years" (from Somewhere in Time, 1986)
11. "Seventh Son of a Seventh Son" (from Seventh Son of a Seventh Son, 1988)
12. "Wrathchild" (from Killers, 1981)
13. "Fear of the Dark" (from Fear of the Dark, 1992)
14. "Iron Maiden" (from Iron Maiden, 1980)

Encore

- "Churchill's Speech"
1. "Aces High" (from Powerslave, 1984)
2. "The Evil That Men Do" (from Seventh Son of a Seventh Son, 1988)
3. "Sanctuary" (from Iron Maiden, 1980)

Notes:

- "Wrathchild" was dropped from the setlist from 14 June onwards.

=== Stage set ===
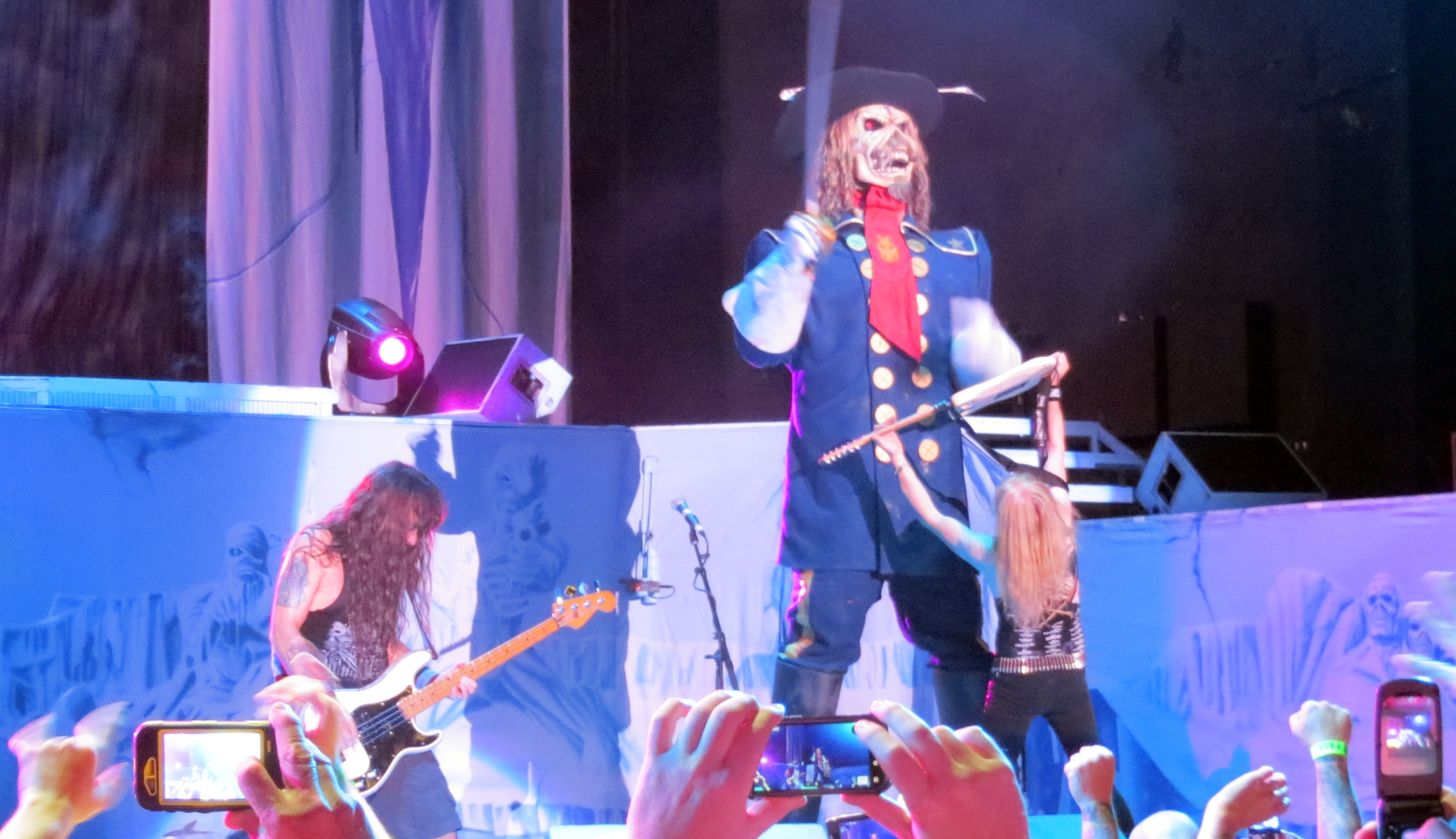

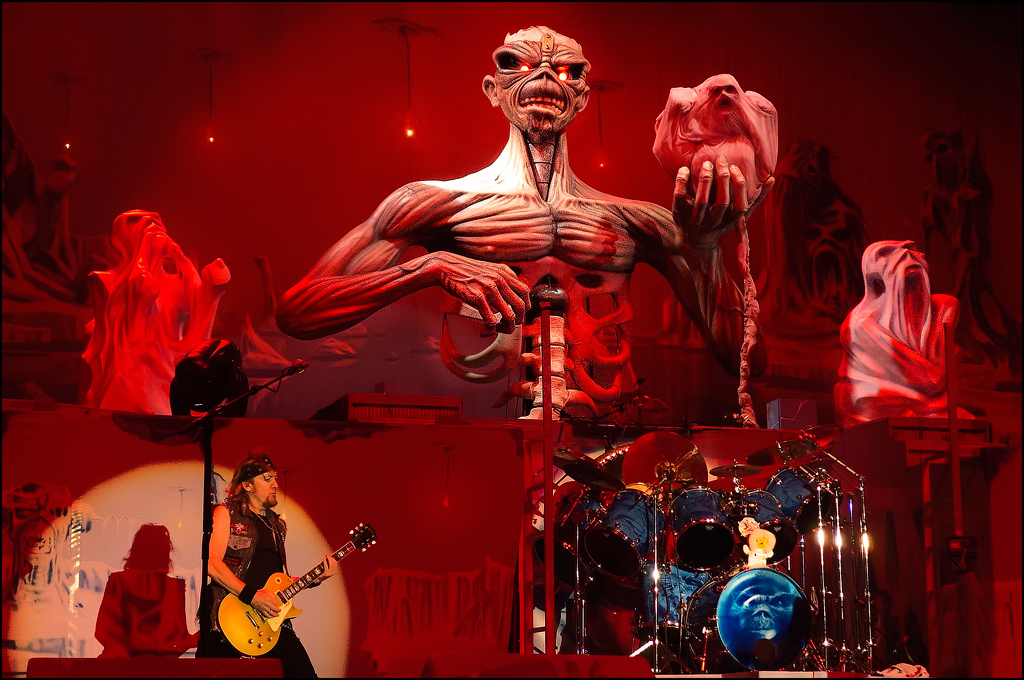
The band's mascot, Eddie, appeared up to three times in each performance, firstly as General Custer during "Run to the Hills" (top) and finally as a recreation of the Seventh Son of a Seventh Son cover art during "Iron Maiden" (bottom).

As confirmed in the tour's press release, the band's stage set was decorated in an Arctic-style similar to the original Seventh Tour of a Seventh Tour. As usual, the group used a wraparound stage with platforms and podiums for vocalist Bruce Dickinson to use, this time decorated with frozen pictures of the band's mascot Eddie. After its absence during The Final Frontier World Tour 2010–11, the band returned to using pyrotechnics. Dickinson explained in 2011 that "we like to alternate it every other year, because if you get the reputation that you've got to go and see a band because of the pyro and then you don't do the pyro, people think, 'Oh, I won't bother then.'"

Three additional Eddies made appearances throughout the show: a 15-foot walking General Custer during "Run to the Hills", a scribe (based on artwork from the Seventh Son of a Seventh Son album's inner sleeve) during the song "Seventh Son of a Seventh Son" (although unable to appear at some concerts in the US due to space limitations) and finally an Eddie based on the Seventh Son of a Seventh Son cover art during "Iron Maiden", which featured flames emerging from its head. On top of this, a goat/devil statue appeared during "The Number of the Beast" and Michael Kenney, the band's backstage keyboard player, surfaced during "Seventh Son of a Seventh Son" wearing a mask and cape as he did on the Seventh Tour of a Seventh Tour.

Steve Harris stated that the band had "been working on this stage production for a very long time", and decided to use "the same people who created the original Maiden England production for us [in 1988]." He went on to explain that "We wanted to keep the same theme but, wherever possible, to surpass the production of that tour – given the technology on offer today. And I think we've achieved that, especially with our light show, all the pyro and, of course, Eddie!" According to the Sarnia Observer, the band "brought 22 tractor trailers and buses full of equipment for the show" while Sarnia Bayfest organiser Michele Stokley stated that it was the largest production the festival had ever hosted, even bigger than Kiss'. Cadott's Rock Fest had to expand their stage in order to fit the band's production, with festival organiser Wade Asher also recognising it as "the biggest set we've ever had".

== Reception ==
The tour received critical acclaim, with Loudwire labelling it as "not an event to be missed". Creative Loafing Charlotte stated that the group's opening performance proved "Iron Maiden as a whole is back and in fine metal form", while Revolver were also extremely positive in their review of the Newark show, saying that "while fans can always expect an energetic, acrobatic set from the English metal legends, it's impressive that the group is able to put on a show that so perfectly recalled the things that made them special in the first place." CTV News described the concert in Vancouver as "ferocious, timeless and just a little bit daft", concluding that "Iron Maiden [were] utterly entertaining from start to finish", while The Salt Lake Tribune reported that "the band surprised and delighted with a near flawless performance" in West Valley City, deeming that "it was a night to remember." Metal Hammer awarded the band full marks for their performance in Toronto, remarking that it was "a night of flawless, breathtaking victory" before concluding that "tonight is made in Heaven."

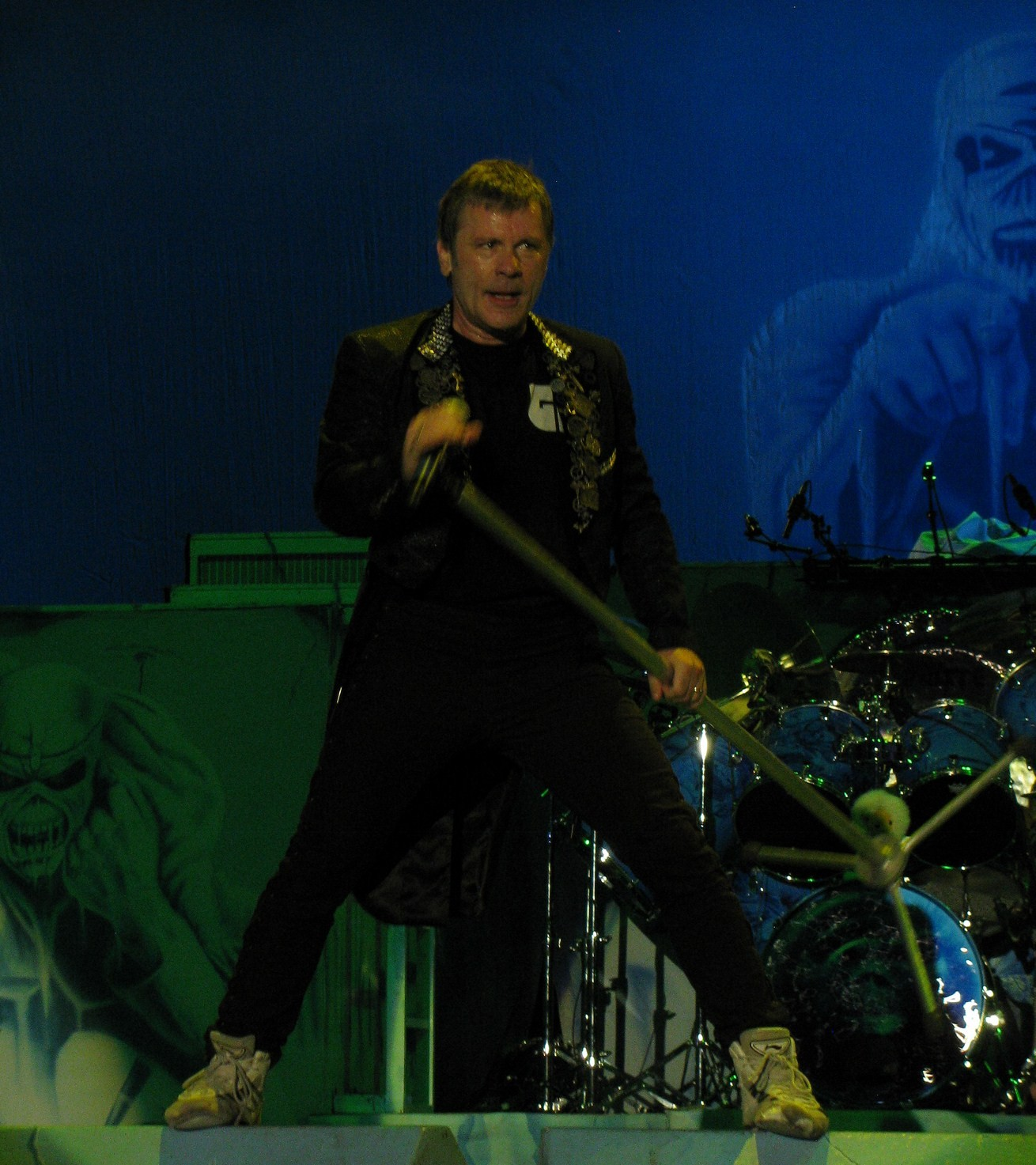
Vocalist Bruce Dickinson received particular acclaim during the tour, with critics praising his vocal performance and stage presence.

The band's individual performances were also applauded, with the Calgary Sun deeming the group "relentless" and the Calgary Herald commenting that "these veterans [still] possess some ferocious chops". Loudwire stated that the group gave "the performance of a lifetime from the very first note of 'Moonchild'", while the Los Angeles Times described the music as "tight, precise and flawless." Lead singer Bruce Dickinson received particular acclaim, with Creative Loafing Charlotte saying his voice was "in perfect shape – maybe even showing more power than heard on albums", while NUVO argued that he "out-sang, out-performed and out-swaggered any other vocalist out there", and The Dallas Morning News remarked that he "looks and sounds remarkably youthful ... his robust wail of a voice didn't miss a beat". The Edmonton Journal described him as "a whirl of pure energy, impressive at age 53", while CTV News stated that he was "an over-animated ball of theatrical energy", and that he gave "a front man master-class."

Praise was also awarded for the tour's setlist, which CTV News reported as "an all killer, minimal filler set list for the ages...a less than gentle stroll down memory lane", while Kerrang! considered it "possibly their mostly deliriously direct set list ever", consisting of "hit after hit after hit." The Edmonton Journal described it as "every Maiden song you would ever wish for," while Loudwire stated that "this may very well be the last time you have the chance to hear some of Maiden's greatest works live." The Calgary Herald, although deeming it "a night of nostalgia", commented that it was "a collection of songs that have aged surprisingly well in a genre that often doesn't." Creative Loafing Charlotte argued that "Iron Maiden isn't on a nostalgia trip this time around. They're putting everything they've got into the music" and "it's difficult to fathom that any fans left the show disappointed". In contrast to this, the absence of "Infinite Dreams" (from Seventh Son of a Seventh Son, 1988) was criticised by Rolling Stone Spain and Le Journal du Dimanche, while Metro Winnipeg described the inclusion of "Afraid to Shoot Strangers" as "a weird time to pull out a deep cut", although they went on to state that the "momentum wasn't lost for long".

While the Calgary Sun stated that "the music is never outdone by the spectacle", the stage show was also well received, with Creative Loafing Charlotte deeming it "a feast for the eyes and ears". The Calgary Herald commented that "Maiden pulled out all the stops for the faithful", while the Edmonton Journal argued that "you can't be bored at an Iron Maiden concert, even if you happen to not like the music — which you should", elaborating that this is because "there's just far too much going on, with the ever-changing backdrops, pyrotechnics and rampaging demons."

== Opening acts ==
=== 2012 ===
- Alice Cooper - All dates from 21 June to 21 July.
- Coheed and Cambria - All dates from 24 July to 18 August.

=== 2013 ===
- Voodoo Six - Bilbao, Lisbon, Paris, Frankfurt, Berlin, Hamburg, Zurich, Amsterdam, Singen-Aach, Łódź, Gdańsk, Oberhausen, Malmö, Stockholm, Bucharest, Istanbul, Prague, Zagreb, and London (3 August)
- Ghost - Singen-Aach, Oberhausen, Helsinki, Mexico City, São Paulo, Curitiba, Buenos Aires, Asunción, and Santiago
- Sabaton - Singen-Aach, Oberhausen, Malmö, Stockholm, Saint Petersburg, Moscow, and Helsinki
- Amorphis - Helsinki
- Anthrax - Bucharest, Istanbul, and Zagreb
- Zico Chain - London (4 August)
- Megadeth - All dates across United States
- Slayer - Mexico City, São Paulo, Curitiba, Buenos Aires, Asunción, and Santiago

=== 2014 ===
- Anthrax - Barcelona, Bilbao, and Budapest
- Ghost - Brno, Sofia, Belgrade, Poznań, and Roeser
- Slayer - Poznań

== Tour dates ==
List of 2012 concerts
Date	City	Country	Venue
21 June 2012	Charlotte	United States	Verizon Wireless Amphitheatre
23 June 2012	Atlanta	United States	Aaron's Amphitheatre at Lakewood
26 June 2012	Mansfield	United States	Comcast Center
27 June 2012	Wantagh	United States	Nikon at Jones Beach Theater
29 June 2012	Camden	United States	Susquehanna Bank Center
30 June 2012	Bristow	United States	Jiffy Lube Live
2 July 2012	Newark	United States	Prudential Center
4 July 2012^{[A]}	Milwaukee	United States	Marcus Amphitheater
5 July 2012	Tinley Park	United States	First Midwest Bank Amphitheatre
7 July 2012^{[B]}	Ottawa	Canada	LeBreton Flats Park
8 July 2012	Quebec City	Canada	Colisée Pepsi
11 July 2012	Montreal	Canada	Bell Centre
13 July 2012	Toronto	Canada	Molson Canadian Amphitheatre
14 July 2012^{[C]}	Sarnia	Canada	Centennial Park
16 July 2012	Corfu	United States	Darien Lake Performing Arts Center
18 July 2012	Clarkston	United States	DTE Energy Music Theatre
19 July 2012	Noblesville	United States	Klipsch Music Center
21 July 2012^{[D]}	Cadott	United States	Cadott Festival Grounds
24 July 2012	Winnipeg	Canada	MTS Centre
26 July 2012	Calgary	Canada	Scotiabank Saddledome
27 July 2012	Edmonton	Canada	Rexall Place
29 July 2012	Vancouver	Canada	Pacific Coliseum
30 July 2012	Auburn	United States	White River Amphitheatre
1 August 2012	West Valley City	United States	USANA Amphitheatre
3 August 2012	Mountain View	United States	Shoreline Amphitheatre
4 August 2012	Wheatland	United States	Sleep Train Amphitheatre
6 August 2012	Phoenix	United States	Ashley Furniture HomeStore Pavilion
9 August 2012	Irvine	United States	Verizon Wireless Amphitheatre
10 August 2012	Irvine	United States	Verizon Wireless Amphitheatre
12 August 2012	Albuquerque	United States	Hard Rock Pavilion
13 August 2012	Greenwood Village	United States	Comfort Dental Amphitheatre
15 August 2012	San Antonio	United States	AT&T Center
17 August 2012	Dallas	United States	Gexa Energy Pavilion
18 August 2012	The Woodlands	United States	Cynthia Woods Mitchell Pavilion

List of 2013 concerts
Date	City	Country	Venue
27 May 2013	Bilbao	Spain	Bilbao Exhibition Centre (Hall 2)
29 May 2013	Lisbon	Portugal	MEO Arena
31 May 2013^{[E]}	Madrid	Spain	Miguel Ríos Auditorium
1 June 2013^{[E]}	Barcelona	Spain	Parc Del Fòrum
5 June 2013	Paris	France	Palais Omnisports de Paris-Bercy
8 June 2013^{[E]}	Milan	Italy	Fiera Open Air Arena
9 June 2013^{[E]}	Amnéville	France	Snowhall Parc
11 June 2013	Frankfurt	Germany	Festhalle Frankfurt
12 June 2013	Frankfurt	Germany	Festhalle Frankfurt
15 June 2013^{[F]}	Castle Donington	England	Donington Park
18 June 2013	Berlin	Germany	O_{2} World
19 June 2013	Hamburg	Germany	O_{2} World
21 June 2013^{[G]}	Graz	Austria	Schwarzl Freizeitzentrum
22 June 2013	Zürich	Switzerland	Hallenstadion
25 June 2013	Amsterdam	Netherlands	Ziggo Dome
27 June 2013^{[H]}	Piešťany	Slovakia	Piešťany Airport
29 June 2013	Singen–Aach	Germany	Open Air Arena
30 June 2013^{[I]}	Dessel	Belgium	Boeretang Festival park
3 July 2013	Łódź	Poland	Atlas Arena
4 July 2013	Gdańsk	Poland	Ergo Arena
6 July 2013	Oberhausen	Germany	Open Air an der KöPi-Arena
10 July 2013	Malmö	Sweden	Malmö Stadion
13 July 2013	Stockholm	Sweden	Friends Arena
16 July 2013	Saint Petersburg	Russia	Ice Palace
18 July 2013	Moscow	Russia	Olimpyski Stadium
20 July 2013	Helsinki	Finland	Helsinki Olympic Stadium
24 July 2013	Bucharest	Romania	Piața Constituției
26 July 2013	Istanbul	Turkey	BJK İnönü Stadium
29 July 2013	Prague	Czech Republic	Eden Arena
31 July 2013	Zagreb	Croatia	Arena Zagreb
3 August 2013	London	England	The O_{2} Arena
4 August 2013	London	England	The O_{2} Arena
3 September 2013	Raleigh	United States	Time Warner Cable Music Pavilion
5 September 2013	Nashville	United States	Bridgestone Arena
7 September 2013	Kansas City	United States	Sprint Center
8 September 2013	Maryland Heights	United States	Verizon Wireless Amphitheatre
10 September 2013	Austin	United States	Austin360 Amphitheater
12 September 2013	Las Vegas	United States	Mandalay Bay Events Center
13 September 2013^{[J]}	San Bernardino	United States	San Manuel Amphitheater
17 September 2013	Mexico City	Mexico	Foro Sol
20 September 2013	São Paulo	Brazil	Anhembi Arena
22 September 2013^{[K]}	Rio de Janeiro	Brazil	City of Rock
24 September 2013	Curitiba	Brazil	BioParque
27 September 2013	Buenos Aires	Argentina	River Plate Stadium
29 September 2013	Asunción	Paraguay	Jockey Club
2 October 2013	Santiago	Chile	Estadio Nacional de Chile

List of 2014 concerts
Date	City	Country	Venue
27 May 2014	Barcelona	Spain	Palau Sant Jordi
29 May 2014	Bilbao	Spain	Bizkaia Arena
31 May 2014^{[L]}	Nijmegen	Netherlands	Goffertpark
1 June 2014^{[M]}	Bologna	Italy	Arena Joe Strummer
3 June 2014	Budapest	Hungary	Budapest Sports Arena
5 June 2014^{[N]}	Nürburg	Germany	Nürburgring
8 June 2014	Brno	Czech Republic	Velodrom
9 June 2014^{[N]}	Nuremberg	Germany	Zeppelinfeld
11 June 2014^{[O]}	Copenhagen	Denmark	B&W Hallerne
13 June 2014^{[P]}	Interlaken	Switzerland	Interlaken Airfield
14 June 2014^{[Q]}	Nickelsdorf	Austria	Pannonia Fields II
16 June 2014	Sofia	Bulgaria	Arena Armeec
17 June 2014	Belgrade	Serbia	Kalemegdan Park
20 June 2014^{[R]}	Clisson	France	Val de Moine
24 June 2014	Poznań	Poland	INEA Stadion
26 June 2014^{[S]}	Norrköping	Sweden	Bråvalla
28 June 2014^{[T]}	Bergen	Norway	Koengen
1 July 2014	Roeser	Luxembourg	Herchesfeld
3 July 2014^{[U]}	Arras	France	Citadelle d'Arras
5 July 2014^{[E]}	Stevenage	England	Knebworth Park

Festival performances

^{A} This concert was a part of "Summerfest"
^{B} This concert was a part of "Ottawa Bluesfest"
^{C} This concert was a part of "Sarnia Bayfest"
^{D} This concert was a part of "Rock Fest"
^{E} This concert was a part of "Sonisphere Festival"
^{F} This concert was a part of "Download Festival"
^{G} This concert was a part of "Seerock Festival"
^{H} This concert was a part of "Topfest"
^{I} This concert was a part of "Graspop Metal Meeting"
^{J} This concert was a part of "The Battle of San Bernardino"
^{K} This concert was a part of "Rock in Rio"
^{L} This concert was a part of "FortaRock Festival"
^{M} This concert was a part of "Rock in Idro"
^{N} This concert was a part of "Rock am Ring and Rock im Park"
^{O} This concert was a part of "Copenhell"
^{P} This concert was a part of "Greenfield Festival"
^{Q} This concert was a part of "Nova Rock Festival"
^{R} This concert was a part of "Hellfest"
^{S} This concert was a part of "Bråvalla Festival"
^{T} This concert was a part of "Bergen Calling"
^{U} This concert was a part of "Main Square Festival"

=== Box office score data ===
Venue	City	Tickets sold / available	Gross revenue (USD)
Verizon Wireless Amphitheatre	Charlotte	12,501 / 17,654 (71%)	$562,231
Aaron's Amphitheatre at Lakewood	Atlanta	13,306 / 17,974 (74%)	$514,190
Comcast Center	Mansfield	12,945 / 12,945 (100%)	$700,658
Nikon at Jones Beach Theater	Wantagh	11,926 / 12,267 (97%)	$830,447
Susquehanna Bank Center	Camden	10,688 / 24,070 (44%)	$557,363
Jiffy Lube Live	Bristow	11,692 / 21,480 (54%)	$644,260
Prudential Center	Newark	9,929 / 10,551 (94%)	$797,483
Marcus Amphitheater	Milwaukee	11,691 / 21,017 (56%)	$482,815
Colisée Pepsi	Quebec City	8,032 / 10,080 (80%)	$610,729
Bell Centre	Montreal	11,121 / 11,689 (95%)	$843,948
Molson Canadian Amphitheatre	Toronto	14,597 / 16,010 (91%)	$893,088
Darien Lake Performing Arts Center	Corfu	9,579 / 20,172 (47%)	$455,476
DTE Energy Music Theatre	Clarkston	9,400 / 13,298 (71%)	$417,603
Klipsch Music Center	Noblesville	8,452 / 22,597 (37%)	$360,314
MTS Centre	Winnipeg	6,444 / 9,355 (69%)	$494,378
Scotiabank Saddledome	Calgary	8,856 / 10,086 (88%)	$687,601
Rexall Place	Edmonton	10,352 / 10,352 (100%)	$837,140
White River Amphitheatre	Auburn	9,102 / 19,058 (48%)	$447,440
USANA Amphitheatre	West Valley City	12,456 / 20,082 (62%)	$608,950
Shoreline Amphitheatre	Mountain View	11,552 / 21,251 (54%)	$494,247
Verizon Wireless Amphitheatre^{[1]}	Irvine	25,484 / 28,229 (90%)	$1,409,540
Gexa Energy Pavilion	Dallas	9,060 / 19,150 (47%)	$418,873
Cynthia Woods Mitchell Pavilion	The Woodlands	9,450 / 15,543 (61%)	$563,172
O_{2} World	Hamburg	10,838 / 11,811 (92%)	$807,111
Pavilhão Atlântico	Lisbon	18,013 / 18,013 (100%)	$783,203
Palais Omnisports de Paris-Bercy	Paris	16,530 / 16,530 (100%)	$1,180,960
Festhalle^{[1]}	Frankfurt	23,392 / 23,853 (98%)	$1,598,910
O_{2} World	Berlin	10,729 / 13,033 (82%)	$733,778
Hallenstadion	Zurich	12,776 / 13,000 (98%)	$876,265
Ziggo Dome	Amsterdam	15,507 / 15,756 (98%)	$1,198,890
Open Air Arena	Singen	22,251 / 23,000 (97%)	$1,517,020
Atlas Arena	Łódź	13,836 / 13,836 (100%)	$793,743
Ergo Arena	Gdańsk	11,964 / 11,964 (100%)	$681,527
Open Air an der KöPi-Arena	Oberhausen	26,500 / 26,500 (100%)	$1,911,340
Malmö Stadion	Malmö	21,431 / 21,431 (100%)	$1,975,910
Friends Arena	Solna	55,531 / 55,531 (100%)	$5,001,410
Olympiastadion	Helsinki	26,094 / 30,000 (87%)	$2,361,660
Piața Constituției	Bucharest	10,844 / 12,000 (90%)	$624,965
BJK İnönü Stadium	Istanbul	17,234 / 20,000 (86%)	$1,444,160
Eden Arena	Prague	24,865 / 30,000 (83%)	$1,526,660
Arena Zagreb	Zagreb	15,330 / 17,000 (90%)	$680,915
O_{2} Arena^{[1]}	London	26,913 / 26,913 (100%)	$1,961,110
Time Warner Cable Music Pavilion	Raleigh	10,632 / 19,498 (55%)	$459,246
Bridgestone Arena	Nashville	10,440 / 11,434 (91%)	$629,411
Sprint Center	Kansas City	9,549 / 9,753 (98%)	$583,694
Verizon Wireless Amphitheater	Maryland Heights	9,193 / 19,574 (47%)	$369,837
Austin360 Amphitheater	Austin	10,897 / 13,237 (82%)	$637,596
Mandalay Bay Events Center	Las Vegas	8,543 / 8,543 (100%)	$633,499
San Manuel Amphitheater	Devore	27,276 / 41,802 (65%)	$1,395,633
Foro Sol	Mexico City	49,332 / 50,000 (99%)	$2,245,413
Anhembi Arena	São Paulo	31,706 / 31,706 (100%)	$2,660,362
Bio Parque	Curitiba	12,079 / 20,000 (60%)	$1,013,680
Estadio River Plate	Buenos Aires	50,680 / 53,000 (96%)	$3,098,169
Jockey Club	Asunción	15,581 / 26,586 (59%)	$899,559
Estadio Nacional	Santiago	57,217 / 59,525 (96%)	$2,696,550
TOTAL		942,318 / 1,149,739 (82%)	$69,243,543

Notes
^{1} Figures represent two performances at the same venue

== Personnel ==
(Credits taken from the official tour programme.)

Iron Maiden

- Bruce Dickinson – lead vocals
- Dave Murray – guitar
- Adrian Smith – guitar, backing vocals
- Janick Gers – guitar
- Steve Harris – bass guitar, backing vocals
- Nicko McBrain – drums, percussion

Management

- Rod Smallwood
- Andy Taylor

Booking Agents

- Rick Roskin at CAA (North America)
- John Jackson at K2 Agency Ltd. (Rest of the World)

Crew

- Dickie Bell – production consultant
- Ian Day – tour director
- John "Collie" Collins – tour manager
- Patrick Ledwith – production manager
- Rik Benbow – stage manager
- Zeb Minto – production coordinator
- Kerry Harris – production assistant
- Martin Walker – front of house sound engineer
- Rob Coleman – lighting designer
- Michael Mule – monitor engineer
- Antti Saari – lighting chief
- Sean Brady – Adrian Smith's guitar technician
- Michael Kenney – bass guitar technician and keyboards
- Charlie Charlesworth – drum technician
- Justin Garrick – Janick Gers' guitar technician
- Colin Price – Dave Murray's guitar technician
- Ian 'Squid' Walsh – sound technician
- Mike Hackman – sound system technician
- Ashley Groom – set carpenter
- Philip Stewart – set carpenter
- Jude Aflalo – set carpenter
- Eoin McBrien – set carpenter
- Jeffrey Weir – head of security
- Natasha De Sampayo – wardrobe
- Andy Matthews – video director
- Nicholas Birtwistle – video technician
- Peter Lokrantz – masseuse/security
- Ian "Evo" Evans – merchandising
- Todd Nakamine – tour press coordinator
- Howard Johnson – tour press coordinator
