= Voodoo Six =

British hard rock band

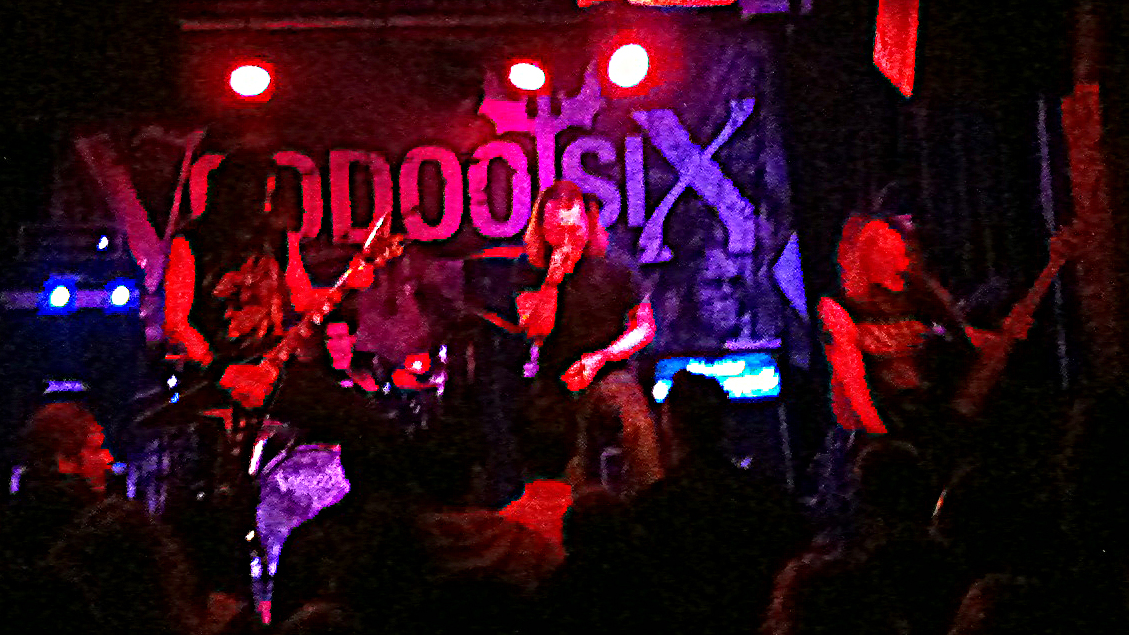
- Voodoo Six performing at The Cluny, Newcastle upon Tyne in 2014

Background information
- Origin: London, England
- Genres: Hard rock
- Years active: 2003–present
- Labels: Cadiz Music, Spinefarm Records, Powerage, Locomotive Records
- Members: Tony Newton; Matt Pearce; Joe Lazarus; Nik Taylor-Stoakes; Tommy Gentry
- Past members: Richie Faulkner; Dave Cavill; Henry Rundell; Chris Jones; Luke Purdie; Craig Price
- Website: www.voodoosix.com

Voodoo Six are a British hard rock band formed in the summer of 2003 by bassist Tony Newton and guitarist Richie Faulkner. The current line-up of the band consists of Nik Taylor-Stoakes (lead vocals), Matt Pearce (guitar), Tony Newton (bass), Joe Lazarus (drums) and Tommy Gentry (guitar).

== History ==
The band was conceived by bassist Tony Newton (ex-Dirty Deeds) and guitarist Richie Faulkner following a brief stopover by Newton in Los Angeles for production work. Upon his return to England, he and Faulkner began recruiting members for the band, before starting on the club circuit. In 2005, supplemented by drummer Dave "Grav" Cavill, vocalist Henry Rundell, and second guitarist Matt Pearce, they opened for Iron Maiden at the Hammersmith Apollo.

Their first album, "Feed My Soul" was released the following year. This was later re-mixed and re-issued as "First Hit For Free" in 2008, which also featured a new song, "Faith". By this time, Faulkner had left the band, his place being taken by Chris Jones. Faulkner later joined Judas Priest.

By the time of the band's next release, the 2010 EP "A Little Something For You", Luke Purdie had taken over on vocals. Purdie is notable for being the grandson of late entertainer Bruce Forsyth.

The "Fluke?" album followed shortly after, although Cavill left after the subsequent tour and joined Tank, with Joe Lazarus taking over on drums. This line-up recorded the "Falling Knives" EP in 2011, which was followed by the 2013 album "Songs To Invade Countries To". The band supported Iron Maiden on the European leg of their Maiden England World Tour and subsequently headlined their tour throughout Europe in 2014.

Purdie left the band after this tour, his place eventually being taken by Nik-Taylor Stoakes. By the time of recording their 2017 album "Make Way for the King", Chris Jones had also departed, leaving Matt Pearce to record all the guitar parts on the record. Craig Price assisted them on a European tour ahead of the album's release and was later confirmed as a full-time member of the band.

== Notable performances ==
Voodoo Six have performed at four separate Download Festival festivals (in 2006, 2008, 2012 and 2013) and at Sonisphere Festival in 2010. They also toured with Iron Maiden as the main support band on their European Maiden England World Tour. After performing back at Sonisphere in 2014 they embarked on a European Tour.

== Discography ==
=== Studio albums ===
- Feed My Soul (2006)
- First Hit for Free (2008)
- Fluke? (2010)
- Songs to Invade Countries To (2013)
- Make Way for the King (2017)
- Simulation Game (2020)

=== EPs ===
- A Little Something for You (2010)
- Falling Knives (2011)
- Lead Me On (2014)
