= Unforgiven (Cockney Rejects album) =

Studio album by Cockney Rejects
- Released: 2007
- Genre: Punk rock, Oi!
- Label: G & R, later licensed to Randale

Cockney Rejects chronology
Out of the Gutter (2003)	Unforgiven (2007)	East End Babylon (2012)

Unforgiven is an album by the band Cockney Rejects released in 2007.

== Track listing ==
1. "Cockney Reject"
2. "Come See Me"
3. "It's Alright Bruv"
4. "Fists of Fury"
5. "(The Ballad Of) Big Time Charlie"
6. "Unforgiven"
7. "Useless Generation"
8. "Wish You Weren't Here"
9. "Bubbles"
10. "Gonna Make You a Star"
11. "Stick 2 Your Guns"
12. "(I Dont Wanna) Fight No More"
13. "See You Later"
