= K. K. Downing =

English guitarist (born 1951)

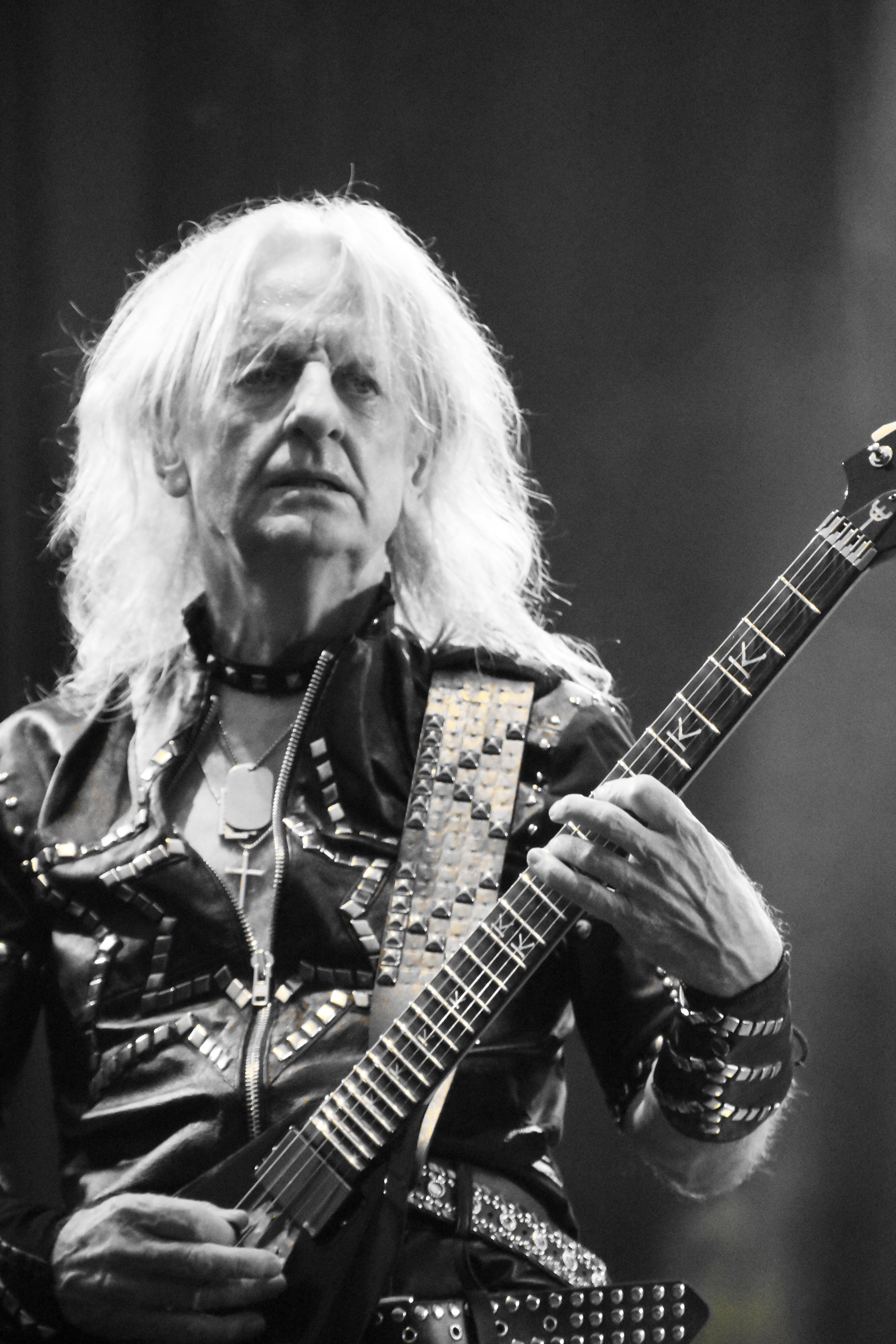
- Downing in 2024

Background information
- Born: Kenneth Keith Downing Jr. 27 October 1951 (age 74); West Bromwich, England
- Genres: Heavy metal, hard rock
- Occupations: Musician, songwriter
- Instrument: Guitar
- Years active: 1968–2012, 2019–present
- Member of: KK's Priest
- Formerly of: Judas Priest
- Website: kkdowning.net

Kenneth Keith Downing Jr. (born 27 October 1951) is an English guitarist and a former member of the heavy metal band Judas Priest and current member of KK's Priest.

== Early life and career ==
Downing was born in West Bromwich, West Midlands. In the late 1960s, he developed a passion for rock music and the guitar, which led to his being kicked out of his home at age 15 and dropping out of school soon afterward. He is a mostly self-taught guitarist. He was heavily influenced by Jimi Hendrix, whom Downing said he was "very quick to recognize" as the future. He was also influenced by John Mayall & the Bluesbreakers and Eric Clapton.

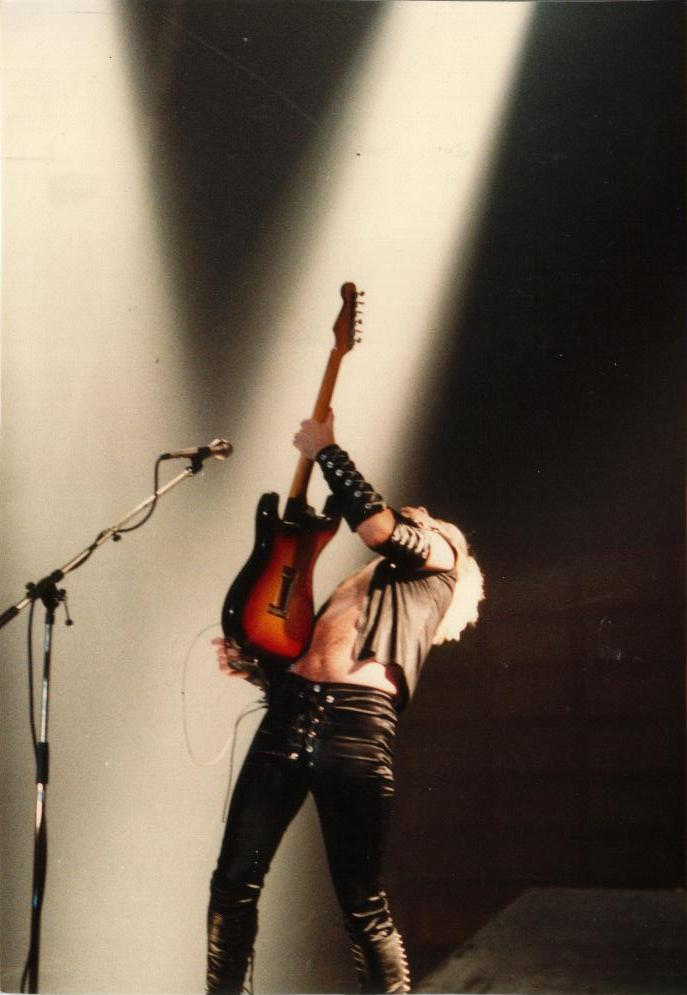
Downing in 1980

Downing started his first band, a pop band called Stagecoach, between the ages of 17 and 18, with his second cousin Brian Badhams on bass guitar (now with The Elkie Brooks Band) and drummer Martin Phillips. The trio "mainly jammed a few Cream songs and a few 12-bar blues". Downing played guitar with the band after winning a coin toss with Badhams "in his bedroom to see who would play guitar or bass". K. K. Downing attended catering college and worked as trainee chef at the Lyttelton Arms in Hagley.

In 1970, Downing joined Judas Priest. In 1974, Glenn Tipton also joined the band, leading to a two guitarist arrangement.

== Leaving Judas Priest ==
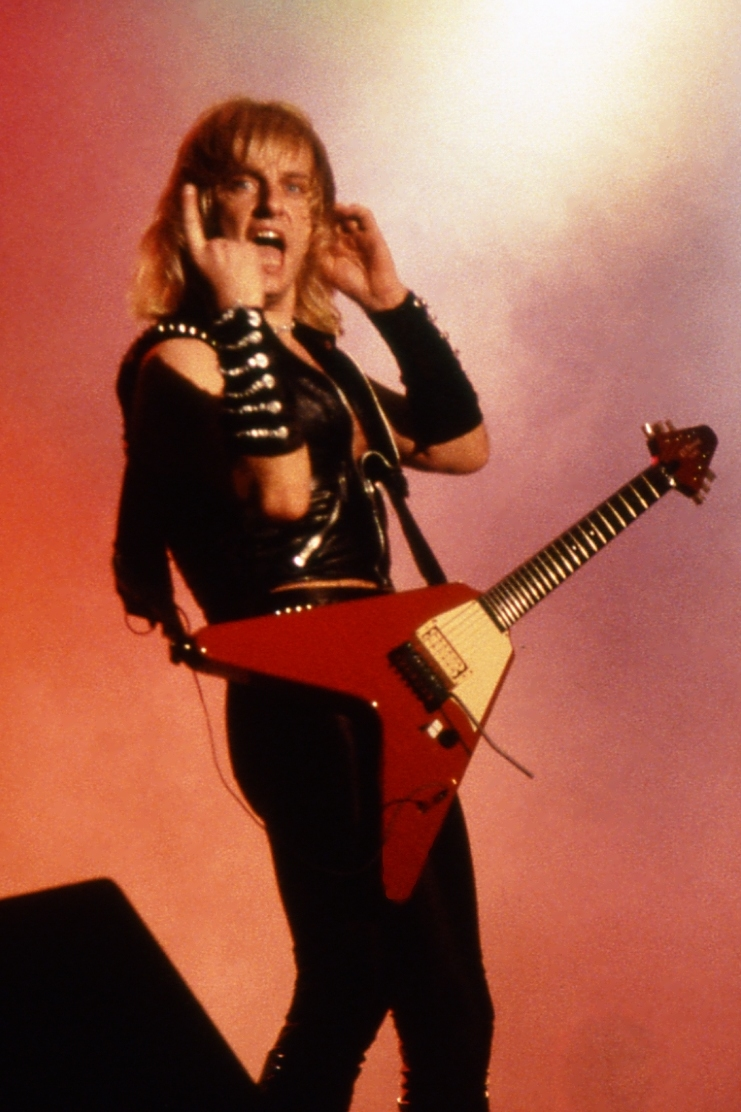
Downing in 1984

Downing officially left Judas Priest on 20 April 2011, citing "an on-going breakdown in working relationships between myself, elements of the band and management for some time." He stated that there were at least "21 reasons" why he left, but refused to go into specific detail; however, he did express disappointment in the band's live performance and thought it could have been better. Judas Priest had since continued with Richie Faulkner as his replacement.

Soon after Glenn Tipton announced his Parkinson's disease diagnosis and his self-imposed retirement from touring in February 2018, Downing said that he was "shocked and stunned" that he was not approached to rejoin Judas Priest and was "officially and legally still a member of Judas Priest", despite not being present in the band. He felt that he made the right choice to leave when he did and that his time in the band and value in terms of crafting their legacy "was and is unappreciated by more than one member". He said that the decision of not being approached "was not a financial one". Faulkner and Halford spoke in regards to his statement. Bassist Ian Hill explained why he was not contacted to rejoin Judas Priest and the potential conflicts that would occur if he was brought back in the band. Downing spoke negatively towards Hill's comments.

Downing explained why he left Judas Priest, expressed his concerns towards his former bandmates, and his feelings about Faulkner. Faulkner spoke in regards to Downing's comments, with former Judas Priest vocalist Tim "Ripper" Owens speaking in Downing's defense. In the limelight of Downing's comments, Hill said that Downing and the band have "parted company" musically, explaining that he had not been in contact with him "for the last couple of years because we've been so busy. But I think, musically, we've parted ways, really. Probably the less said, the better."

Halford said that Downing spoke for himself and said that he wanted to retire and wished him well on his future endeavours. Downing recalled the conflicts that occurred in the winter of 2010, and would then reconsider his departure a few months later, which is not mentioned in his autobiography. After speaking to bassist Ian Hill about the change, he received the setlist for the dubbed farewell tour, only to find out that his announcement to retire from the band was made public the next day, prompting him to send in his angry second letter. Downing felt that he never left Judas Priest and was orchestrated for him to not be there.

Downing stated that he never retired from the music industry, detailing about being encouraged to perform on the farewell tour by a friend and being ridiculed by the fans about his announcement. After guitarist Glenn Tipton's dismissal from touring, Downing expected an opening for him to return, but was never notified. He said essentially the band was performing his songs and that if they can call themselves "Priest", he felt the need to be a Priest as well and be able to perform his songs. Downing recalled being frustrated and having a breakdown at the end of 2010, leading him to quit the band. He said that he was not ready to perform on the farewell tour due to his issues that occurred during the Metal Masters Tour, saying that the band was not tight and felt that they were not the same band as they were in their prime. He regretted sending in the retirement letter and not believing anything he wrote. He cited the second letter, telling the band to ignore everything written and explaining the reasons why he left, but the band preferred to tell the content of the first letter instead, in which he told the band to ignore what he wrote as misinformation.

When speaking about the difference on working with Tipton in Judas Priest to working with guitarist A.J. Mills in his band KK's Priest, Downing said that he felt that he did not have as fair a share of the lead work in Judas Priest as he should have.

=== Future ===
Downing's relationship with Judas Priest is not "overly sweet at the moment. Nothing lasts forever. I started in the late '60s, so certainly guys from that time, we're not going to be around forever. Obviously, we're losing a lot of good friends along the way. It is the way it is." An opportunity existed for him to return to the band, "and that has passed on." He expressed uncertainty if there would ever be another opportunity for him to rejoin, but did not dismiss it in the future.

Downing explained that if he didn't rejoin Judas Priest, "then maybe it's best to just leave it there, really", feeling that there would be a different occupation for him, "Exactly what I don't know, really." Hill said that there were no plans for him to return in the foreseeable future. Downing had an open interest in having a discussion with his former bandmates in taking part in the band's 50th anniversary celebration in 2020, but was not contacted, expressing doubt that he ever would rejoin Judas Priest again.

Downing hoped to make amends with his former bandmates, "But it's proved not to be the case, so, obviously, I have to accept that and just move forward." He clarified his comment from an article published by Blabbermouth, and still held hopes for them to reconcile, "But to date the band have refused me that opportunity." Halford did not dismiss the possibility for Downing to return to Judas Priest in the future. Downing requested for the members to step in and "speak to the press and just make a press release and tell 'em exactly what the deal is", and give "everybody an insight 'cause people wanna know." He once again expressed an open interest in performing with Judas Priest again if given the opportunity, and also perform with them at the Rock and Roll Hall of Fame ceremony in 2020 if inducted, due to his inclusion in the band's ballot, but was denied the possibility of returning to the band for the 50th-anniversary shows. Downing then made the decision to move forward as a result.

Downing said that he is not interested in rejoining Judas Priest as they became complacent, shifting his newfound attention to his own band KK's Priest.

On 5 November 2022, Judas Priest were inducted into the Rock and Roll Hall of Fame as they received the Musical Excellence Award. Downing performed alongside the band for the first time since 2009 as they performed three songs to celebrate their achievement. Downing dismissed the possibility of performing with the band again as he expected for an open chance to be brought back as they were to perform as a quartet on the 50th anniversary tour, but was denied by Tipton and Hill. He said that he offered them one last chance in hopes they would not live to regret it.

== Live return ==
After not performing on stage since Judas Priest's 30th-anniversary celebration of the 1980 album British Steel in 2009, Downing made his live return at the 2019 edition of the Bloodstock Open Air festival where he performed with former Manowar guitarist Ross the Boss as they played the songs "The Green Manalishi (With the Two Prong Crown)", "Heading Out to the Highway", "Breaking the Law" and "Running Wild". He cited it being "a bit of a whirlwind" and the perfect way to get reintroduced to the stage. He also said that there was very little time for him to rehearse as some of the band members arrived the same day of their scheduled rehearsal, "But we did manage to squeeze an hour or so in the following day." He described the performance as being "a jam, really… And there was quite a bit of improvisation in there. And that's where it is." In a Twitter response from a fan, Richie Faulkner praised Downing's performance upon viewing video footage of him, saying that he "looked and sounded great. Good to see the man up on stage where he belongs again."

Downing, along with former Judas Priest members Tim "Ripper" Owens and Les Binks, former Megadeth bassist David Ellefson and Hostile guitarist A.J. Mills performed a special one-off show in Wolverhampton on 3 November 2019 and played a full set of Judas Priest songs.

== KK's Priest ==
In January 2020, Downing signed with Explorer1 Music Group, which paired him with veteran manager Andy Gould, and announced that he would work on brand-new music. The following month, it was announced that Downing had formed a new band, KK's Priest, with bassist Tony Newton, guitarist A.J. Mills, and former Judas Priest members Tim "Ripper" Owens and Les Binks on vocals and drums, respectively. The band's debut album Sermons of the Sinner was originally scheduled to be released on 20 August 2021, but was postponed until 1 October. A music video for the album's lead single, "Hellfire Thunderbolt", was released on 12 May 2021. However, Binks did not appear on the album as a result of a wrist injury and was replaced by Cage drummer Sean Elg. Later, Binks occasionally performed live with KK's Priest.

When speaking to KNAC in June 2021 about Sermons of the Sinner, Downing said that he was already at work on material for the next album, which would be more of a collaboration effort than the first album. In 2023, KK's Priest released their second album "The Sinner Rides Again".

== Musical side projects ==
Downing made a guest appearance on Violent Storm's 2005 self-titled debut album, performing on the track "War No More".

He appeared on the 2012 tribute album Who Are You? An All Star Tribute to the Who, which paid tribute to the Who. He performed on the track "Eminence Front", along with vocalist/bassist John Wetton, keyboardist Derek Sherinian and drummer Billy Sherwood.

Downing appeared on former Queensrÿche vocalist Geoff Tate's Queensrÿche-branded 2013 album Frequency Unknown, performing the guitar solo on "Running Backwards".

In 2018, Downing, along with former Judas Priest members Tim "Ripper" Owens and Les Binks, and Armored Saint bassist Joey Vera were featured in a cover version of the song "Beyond the Realms of Death", fronted by guitarist Paul Crook's band Devilstar, to commemorate the 40th anniversary of Judas Priest's 1978 album Stained Class.

== Autobiography ==
On 18 September 2018, Downing published his autobiography titled Heavy Duty: Days and Nights in Judas Priest via Da Capo Press. It was written by Downing himself along with Mark Eglinton. The memoir details everything from "the complex personality conflicts, the business screw-ups, the acrimonious relationship with fellow heavy metal band Iron Maiden, as well as how Judas Priest found itself at the epicentre of a storm of parental outrage that targeted heavy metal in the '80s", according to the book's synopsis. It also tells about Downing's role in Judas Priest, as well as his decision to leave the band in 2011. It was met with mostly positive reviews.

Since its release, Rob Halford said that he has not taken the time to read Downing's autobiography while in production on his own.

Downing is the cousin of football coach Keith Downing.

In 2018, the music venue Starworks in Wolverhampton was renamed as KK's Steel Mill in honour of Downing, who is an ambassador for the venue.

== Homes ==
Downing's first house was a "tiny semi in Bloxwich". He has lived in Los Angeles and Florida but no longer owns a home in Spain, but his main abode since 1985 remains Astbury Hall in Shropshire. It is in a very secluded area so he can (as stated in a 2007 interview) "really turn up [his] Marshalls really loud". Astbury Hall is also home to a championship golf course, a course created by Downing himself and where he has held publicised charity events. Sarah Lissimore, his former girlfriend, mounted a legal challenge for half of his Shropshire estate. This was based on his assertion, "I'd bet you'd love to be lady of this Manor, wouldn't you?" The High Court of Justice rejected the notion that this assertion could give rise to proprietary estoppel in favour of Lissimore.

In December 2013, it was announced that Downing would be teaming up with a property development finance provider, and golfer Darren Clarke, to help build luxury residential developments on Downing's Astbury estate.

Downing told the Shropshire Star: "We have had a fantastic season, things were going really well. We had plans for a hotel that we were doing really well with. Obviously there was a necessity for a funding element. "The company took out a short-term mezzanine fund in early August to take us through to March. This was essentially to bring in professional architects and a team from London. Everything was in place as far as we were concerned. "Unfortunately about six weeks into the loan we were served a loan termination notice about technical breaches of the agreement. "We are at the moment looking to re-finance that loan. We were taken aback that the funder was not more flexible with us as partners. It was put up for sale for £10 million ($13.5 million). Downing maintained that the development was financially stable and viable as he was set to build a luxury hotel for the Marriott Autograph collection and had hoped to host The Open Championship on the estate's golf course.

Due to the circumstances surrounding his golf resort investment, Downing placed a share of his royalty rights for 136 Judas Priest songs for sale; the catalogue generates nearly £300,000 ($400,000) per year. Joint administrator Alastair Massey called the songs "a unique investment opportunity" from one of the "driving influences" of Judas Priest's success. In July 2018, Round Hill Music acquired the royalty rights to Downing's compositions; the catalogue's asking price was at least £10 million ($13.5 million). Downing later explained about the sellings of his estate, his golf course and his royalty rights of 136 Judas Priest songs, "I'm in the process now of recovering everything else through the legal channels. I made a few rubbish business moves, but I can't complain really because I did okay. Lots of musicians end up with nothing really, but I had an evaluation on the estate worth in excess of £13 million. Quite a few million pounds' worth of music royalties and other assets as well. I'm suing my lawyers for negligence."

== Gear ==
- Hamer Flying V: Issued to KK during the World Vengeance Tour, Hamer would release the KK Downing Flying V for public sale in 1984, ending in 1985. KK's V featured a Floyd Rose Tremolo and a single DiMarzio humbucker.

Amplifiers and effects

- [MXR] Distortion +

== Discography ==
KK's Priest

- Sermons of the Sinner (2021)
- The Sinner Rides Again (2023)
