= Takeo =

Takeo may refer to:

- Takéo Province, a province of Cambodia
  - Doun Kaev (town), formerly known as Takéo, the capital of Takéo province
- Ta Keo, an Angkorian temple in Cambodia
- Takeo, Saga, a city in Saga Prefecture, Japan
- Takeo (given name), a masculine Japanese given name
  - Takeo Doi (aircraft designer), a Japanese aircraft designer
  - Takeo Fukuda, a Japanese politician
  - Takeo Hatanaka, a Japanese radio astronomer
  - Takeo Kurusu, a Japanese politician
  - Takeo Miki, a Japanese politician
  - Takeo Spikes, a former American football player
  - Takeo Takahashi, a Japanese former football player
  - Takeo Takahashi, a Japanese animator
  - Takeo Yoshikawa, a Japanese spy
