= East End Babylon =

Studio album by Cockney Rejects
- Released: 2012
- Genres: Punk rock, Oi!
- Labels: Cadiz Music, Randale Records
- Producers: Jeff Turner, Micky Geggus, Tony Van Frater

Cockney Rejects chronology
Unforgiven (2007)	East End Babylon (2012)

East End Babylon is an album by the band Cockney Rejects released in 2012.

== Track listing ==
1. "Your Country Needs You"
2. "Grasses 'N' Snides"
3. "I Love Being Me"
4. "The Devil Went Down to Essex"
5. "East End Babylon"
6. "Scars to Prove It"
7. "Silvertown"
8. "Bang Out of Order"
9. "Back to My Roots"
10. "In Control Forever"
