= Yasuo =

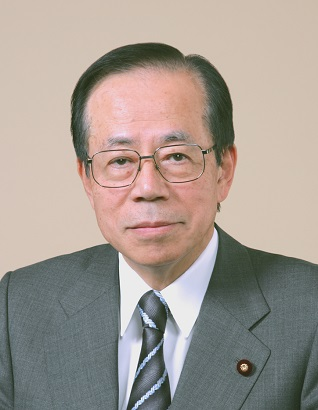
- Yasuo Fukuda, the 58th Prime Minister of Japan
- Pronunciation: jasɯo (IPA)
- Gender: Male

Origin
- Origin: Japanese
- Meaning: Different meanings depending on the kanji used

Yasuo is a masculine Japanese given name.

== Written forms ==
Yasuo can be written using many different combinations of kanji characters. Here are some examples:

- 安雄, "tranquil, male"
- 安男, "tranquil, man"
- 安夫, "tranquil, husband"
- 安生, "tranquil; life"
- 保夫, "preserve, husband"
- 康郎, "healthy, son"
- 靖男, "peaceful, man"
- 泰雄, "peaceful, male"
- 八洲夫, "eight, continent, husband."

The name can also be written in hiragana やすお or katakana ヤスオ.

== People with the name ==
- Yasuo Aiuchi (相内 康夫; born 1971), Japanese snowboarder
- Yasuo Fukuda (福田 康夫; born 1936), the 58th Prime Minister of Japan, serving from 2007 to 2008
- Yasuo Furuhata (降旗 康男; 1934–2019), Japanese film director
- Yasuo Hamanaka (浜中 泰男; born 1950), formerly the chief copper trader at Sumitomo Corporation
- Yasuo Ichikawa (一川 保夫; born 1942), Japanese politician of the Democratic Party of Japan
- Yasuo Iwata (岩田 安生; 1942–2009), Japanese voice actor
- Yasuo Kawamura (河村 泰男; 1908–1997), Japanese speed skater
- Yasuo Kitamura (北村 康雄; born 1932), Japanese swimmer
- Yasuo Kobayashi (小林 保雄; born 1936), Japanese aikido teacher holding the rank of 8th dan Aikikai
- Yasuo Koyama (小山 靖男; 1937–2000), professional Go player
- Yasuo Kuniyoshi (国吉 康雄1893–1953), Japanese-American painter, photographer and printmaker
- Yasuo Maekawa (前川 康男; 1921–2003), Japanese children's book author
- Yasuo Matsui (ヤスオ・マツイ, 1877–1962), Japanese-American architect
- Yasuo Nagatomo (長友 寧雄; born 1951), Japanese sport wrestler
- Yasuo Naito (内藤 靖雄; born 1942), Japanese racewalker
- Yasuo Nakamura (中村 康夫; born 1971), Japanese bobsledder
- Yasuo Otsuka (大塚 康生; born 1931–2021), Japanese animator
- Yasuo Saitō (diplomat) (齋藤 泰雄; born 1948), the Ambassador of Japan to the Russian Federation
- Yasuo Suzuki (鈴木 保男; 1913–2000), Japanese football player
- Yasuo Takada (高田 康雄; born 1950), Japanese swimmer
- Yasuo Takamori (高森 泰男; 1934–2016), former Japanese football player and manager
- Yasuo Takei (武井 保雄; 1930–2006), founder and former chairman of Takefuji consumer finance group
- Yasuo Tanaka (disambiguation)
- Yasuo Tomomichi (友道 康夫; born 1963), Japanese horse trainer
- Yasuo Watanabe (渡辺 保夫; born 1944), Japanese sport wrestler
- Yasuo Yamada (山田 康雄; 1932–1995), Japanese voice actor
- Yasuo Yamashita (山下 八洲夫; born 1942), Japanese politician of the Democratic Party of Japan
- Yasuo Yuasa (湯浅 泰雄; 1925–2005), Japanese philosopher of religion

== Fictional ==
- Yasuo, the Unforgiven, a character from the video game League of Legends
