= Remnants of War =

Studio album by Helstar
- Released: 16 August 1986
- Recorded: Mad Dog Studios, Venice, California
- Genre: Heavy metal; power metal
- Length: 38:50
- Label: Combat; Noise
- Producer: Randy Burns

Helstar chronology
Burning Star (1984)	Remnants of War (1986)	A Distant Thunder (1988)

Professional ratings
Review scores
Source	Rating
Allmusic	4/5 stars
Kerrang!	3.75/5 stars

Remnants of War is the second album by American heavy metal band Helstar, released by Combat Records and Noise Records in August 1986, and the final by the former. It was recorded following a lineup change and a change of studio to Mad Dog Studios in California. The sound of the album was a gradual progression from the traditional heavy metal style of the band's debut album, Burning Star towards the power-thrash sound that the band forged throughout the 1980s.

== Track listing ==
All tracks written by Helstar.

1. "Unidos por Tristeza" - 0:48
2. "Remnants of War" - 3:45
3. "Conquests" - 3:47
4. "Evil Reign" - 4:32
5. "Destroyer" - 5:04
6. "Suicidal Nightmare" - 5:20
7. "Dark Queen" - 4:00
8. "Face the Wicked One" - 5:16
9. "Angel of Death" - 6:18

== Personnel ==
- James Rivera - vocals
- Larry Barragan - guitars
- Rob Trevino - guitars
- Jerry Abarca - bass
- Rene Luna - drums
