= Shadowkeep =

British heavy metal band

- Origin: Guildford, England
- Genres: Heavy metal, power metal, progressive metal, hard rock
- Years active: 1999–present
- Labels: Limb, Rock Brigade, SPV, Melissa, Pure Steel
- Members: Chris Allen; Nikki Robson; Stony Grantham; James Rivera
- Past members: Rogue Marechal; Jim Daley; Russell King; Dave Edwards; Steve Scott; Scott Higham; Richie Wicks; Steve Kightley; Ronnie Stixx; Fredrik Englund; Mauricio Chamucero; Mike Pittman; Lawrence Paterson; Omar Hayes; Scot Collins; Matt Oakman; Mark Fielden; Jack Kirby; Tim Churchman; Tim Hall
- Website: Shadowkeep on Facebook

Shadowkeep are an English heavy metal band formed in Guildford in 1999 by guitarists Chris Allen (ex-Intense and Sire) and Nikki Robson (also formerly of Sire).

== History ==
=== Early recordings ===
In October 1999, Shadowkeep recorded their debut six-track EP at Thin Ice Studios in Surrey, England, with Belgian vocalist Rogue Marechal (ex-Halcyon) fronting the band. The EP was produced by Threshold guitarist Karl Groom. A record deal with Limb Music followed in June 2000, and the band went on to release two albums on this label: Corruption Within (in September 2000) and A Chaos Theory (in 2002).

=== Concerts and festival appearances ===
Shadowkeep's live debut was on 17 December 1999 at the Camden Underworld in London, supporting the band Dirty Deeds. Support slots followed with the likes of Dio, Halford, Symphony X, Angel Witch, Dream Evil and Flotsam and Jetsam. These major shows led to appearances at festivals in the UK (including the first ever Bloodstock Festival in 2001), USA, Greece, Germany and the Netherlands. Unfortunately a planned appearance at the Monterrey Metal Fest in Mexico in 2005 had to be cancelled when the band's drummer and singer quit at the eleventh hour. The band has since appeared at various festivals across Europe and the USA.

=== Line-up changes ===
Shadowkeep have undergone numerous significant line-up changes over the years. Mid-2012 saw the appearance of the band's tenth incarnation.

==== Bass guitarists ====
Jim Daley (who had previously played on Patricia Morrison's solo album Reflect on This) was the band's initial bass guitarist, but he was succeeded by Steve Scott (ex-Dragonheart and a founding member of Power Quest), then by Steve 'SK' Kightley (ex-Spirit Of Rush) and Fredrik Englund, before the arrival of Texas-based Stony Grantham (ex-Terra Vast) in time for the Brave Words & Bloody Knuckles Festival in Cleveland in 2004. A short tour of Texas, with Ancient Cross in support, was arranged for May 2005, as a result of Grantham's involvement with the band. Grantham has remained a full member of Shadowkeep since 2004, but as he lives in the United States, substitute bass players have occasionally been taken on for rehearsals and live concerts in the UK and mainland Europe.

==== Drummers ====
At the band's inception, Allen and Robson's former Sire colleague Russell King was drafted in on drums, but he was later replaced by Dave Edwards (ex-Pete Wadeson Band), then by Scott Higham (ex-Angel Witch) and subsequently by Mauricio Chamucero. Divine Ruins' drummer, the late Mike Pittman, deputised for some US tour dates in 2003. Higham then briefly rejoined the band in early 2004, with New Zealander Lawrence Paterson replacing him for a short while later that same year. When Paterson also moved on (joining first Chokehold, then Blaze Bayley's band, Rogue Male, Iron Knights, Raven Lord, Asomvel, I.C.O.N., Cris Martin's Rock Dawn and Alcatrazz), Mike Pittman again helped out temporarily, until Scott Higham took his place for a third stint in the band. However, Higham departed once more, during the early recording sessions for the third Shadowkeep album, and joined Pendragon, with whom he was a bandmember until April 2014.

Omar Hayes (ex-Orphic Soop, The Delta Sun and Epuldugger) became Shadowkeep's drummer in 2008; he joined the Guildford-based band Mikobi in late 2011, but also remained part of the Shadowkeep line-up until 2013. In February 2013, former bandmember Scott Higham rejoined on a temporary basis. He was succeeded by Tim Churchman (who had previously played alongside Steve Kightley in Spirit of Rush and The Forge, as well as with Dec Burke in Darwin's Radio, and with John Jowitt in Ark). On 4 December 2013, Churchman was announced to have joined the NWOBHM band Soldier. Omar Hayes then rejoined Shadowkeep for the recording of their fourth album.

==== Vocalists ====
Founding vocalist Rogue Marechal departed Shadowkeep in late 2002. He resurfaced for a one-off performance with the band Balance of Power at the Rock The Nations festival in Istanbul on 6 August 2005. Together with ex-Shadowkeep bassist Steve Kightley and guitarist Chris Van Hayden (ex-Biomechanical), he then went on to form a new band called Chaosgenesis, adopting the name from a song on Shadowkeep's second album. His involvement in projects including Virtuocity, Prophecy and Poison Seed was to follow, before his second stint in Shadowkeep, which lasted between 2012 and 2015.

Towards the end of 2002, former Sire and Angel Witch bandmember Richie Wicks took up the vocalist's position, but within a few months he had left to concentrate fully on vocal duties with the Tygers of Pan Tang. His replacement was US vocalist Ronnie Stixx (ex-Terra Vast, Byfist and Divine Ruins), with whom work began on a proposed third album, which would have different working titles at various stages in the process, including The Awakening, Ancient Prophecies and Beyond The Stratosphere. A two-track promotional CD featuring Stixx's vocals saw the light of day in 2005, but further recordings were abandoned when Stixx left Shadowkeep later that same year. He went on to front Wycked Synn, Vicious Rumors, Blood Red Skies, Project Terror and Heaven Sent. His vocals can be heard on the Divine Ruins album, Sign of the Times (released by Lone Wolf Records in 2004), and on the Project Terror albums, Absolute Power (released by Pure Steel Records in 2012), Conquistador (2014) and Apocalypse Rising (scheduled for release in 2016). Stixx also has a career as an actor.

In late 2005, Richie Wicks returned and officially became Shadowkeep's frontman, and work recommenced on the third album, which would now be entitled The Hourglass Effect. The album is a conceptual piece, based around a time in the not-too-distant future when the sun is prematurely dying, and positing the subsequent effects that this phenomenon might have on the Earth's population. The Hourglass Effect was eventually released on Dutch label Melissa Records in November 2008. At this point a reviewer from the UK's The Sun newspaper described the band as, "The new New Wave of British Heavy Metal."

=== Band history, 2008–2011 ===
Richie Wicks departed the band in 2009. He went on to form a Dio-era Black Sabbath tribute band called Heavenly Hell, before joining covers band No Way Out on bass, in March 2011. His replacement was Matt Oakman (formerly of Structured Chaos and Born of War), who made his live debut with Shadowkeep at The Pipeline venue in London on 6 February 2010.

As of 2008–2011, keyboard player Scot Collins (ex-Tainted Grace) completed Shadowkeep's line-up. Collins has also been a member of the bands Duplex Gage and Massive Ego.

Journalist Mark Fielden deputised for Stony Grantham on bass guitar during live shows on Shadowkeep's 'With Force We Come' UK tour in 2010. Grantham was obliged to remain in Austin, Texas at this time, due to ongoing commitments with other bands: Drifter (an Iron Maiden tribute band, with Erika Tandy on vocals) and Sad Wings (a Judas Priest tribute band, featuring vocalist Jason McMaster).

Shadowkeep played a co-headlining gig alongside Pythia at the Peel music venue in Kingston upon Thames, Surrey, England on 1 May 2010.

On 28 August 2010, the band appeared at the Bridgefest 2010 rock festival in Canning Town, which was headlined by Pagan Altar and Tygers of Pan Tang.

Shadowkeep were chosen to headline the third day of the Fyreball Festival at the Westcoast Bar in Margate on 4 September 2011, but this event was cancelled ahead of time when its promoter, Fyrelyte Events, ceased operations. No further live appearances were forthcoming from Shadowkeep during 2011.

=== Band history, 2012–2016 ===
In March 2012, former Shadowkeep members Richie Wicks and Mark Fielden joined forces with Keith Herzberg (ex-Angel Witch), Gary MacKenzie (ex-Praying Mantis), Andy Blackwell and Jason Rice to form a classic metal tribute band called Black, White & Purple. During 2016, Wicks was frontman for a covers band called Snakebyte; as of 2021, he was a member of various bands, including Acoustica, Scavenger's Daughter, No Angel and (from 5 June – 6 September) Kev Riddles' Baphomet.

In April 2012, Chris Allen and Nikki Robson travelled to San Antonio, Texas, to meet up with Stony Grantham and to take part in a tribute concert for guitarist René Solis of the band Texas Trash, who died in January 2012. The gig took place on 7 April 2012, with the band Methuselah also on the bill.

In June 2012, Shadowkeep announced on their official Facebook page that original singer Rogue Marechal was to rejoin the band, and that work was to begin on the fourth Shadowkeep album.

On 16 July 2012, vocalist Matt Oakman officially departed Shadowkeep; he went on to join the bands Dangerous Breed, Gridlock and Stormborn (with whom he was a bandmember until 30 August 2019).

In February 2013, it was announced that Omar Hayes was no longer in Shadowkeep's line-up, due to his unavailability for upcoming festival dates. Taking his place for consecutive gigs at the Chameleon Music Bar in Grantham on 16 March 2013 (with The More I See and NWOBHM band Overdrive) and at the Wizzfest 2013 festival in Aalter, Belgium on 23 March 2013 was former bandmember Scott Higham, although this proved to be a temporary arrangement. Bassist Jack Kirby and keyboard player Tim Hall (from Overdrive) also guested with the band at their Grantham gig.

Shadowkeep performed at the Q's Entertainment venue in Redhill, Surrey on 7 September 2013, at the Little Devil venue in Tilburg on 13 September 2013 with Blitzkrieg, and at the Swordbrothers XII festival in Andernach on 14 September 2013 with Morgana Lefay and Rebellion. Tim Churchman joined them on drums for this series of gigs. During 2014, Omar Hayes rejoined the band for recording sessions.

As of early 2014, the band were reportedly composing their fourth studio album, which was initially set to be recorded at Karl Groom's Thin Ice Studios during 2014 and 2015, with its release provisionally scheduled for 2016 or 2017. A live show (recorded in Belgium on 23 March 2013) was also being prepared simultaneously for a potential release on DVD, but this particular project did not come to fruition.

In late 2015, Rogue Marechal left the band before the completion of the fourth album, prompting a search for a new lead singer.

Bass guitarist Steve 'SK' Kightley temporarily rejoined Shadowkeep in the studio during 2016, with Stony Grantham continuing to be involved in writing and recording with the band. In 2016, Grantham also joined the long-running Texas-based band Byfist, with whom he recorded the album In The End, which was released on Pure Steel Records in September 2020.

=== Band history, 2017 onwards ===
In January 2017, it was announced that Helstar vocalist James Rivera was to join Shadowkeep and would record vocals for the band's fourth album. The eponymous album Shadowkeep was released on Pure Steel Records on 28 March 2018.

A short promotional tour of Germany, Belgium and the Netherlands was arranged for March 2018, with concerts taking place in Osthessen (at the seventh Full Metal Festival, which was co-headlined by Accuser), and in Genk, Lens, Oldenburg, Lünen and Nijverdal.

The band were due to return to the USA during October and November 2018, for a number of shows which were scheduled to take place in Texas with Nasty Savage; however, the UK-based members of the band were unable to travel to meet these arrangements. As Shadowkeep's scheduled appearance on 27 October at the 2018 Pure Steel Metalfest in Lakewood, Ohio similarly could not take place, James Rivera's Metal Asylum headlined the event on that date instead.

In 2019, the progressive metal band Ark Ascent – featuring multi-instrumentalist and occasional stand-in bassist for Shadowkeep, Jack Kirby, alongside former Shadowkeep vocalist Rogue Marechal, DGM bassist Andrea Arcangeli and Sirenia drummer Michael Brush – released their debut album Downfall. Some of the tracks that were included on the album had initially been part of a collaborative project called Prophecy.

During 2020, Shadowkeep alumnus Omar Hayes formed a psychedelic instrumental duo called The Hayabusa with guitarist Kenji 'Jammer' Suzuki. Their debut album Re-entry was released on 12 March 2021.

Since late 2021, former Shadowkeep vocalist Matt Oakman has been working with guitarist Robin Brancher (founder member of NWOBHM band Desolation Angels), as part of a project entitled DA.

Whilst Shadowkeep have been inactive since 2018, bass player Stony Grantham has continued to record and perform live in the USA with Byfist, and vocalist James Rivera has maintained a busy touring schedule with his other bands, including Helstar and James Rivera's Metalwave. Grantham and Rivera have also been involved in a recording project called Texas Metal Outlaws.

== Members ==
=== Current line-up ===
- Chris Allen – guitar (1999–present)
- Nikki Robson – guitar (1999–present)
- Stony Grantham – bass guitar (US; 2004–present)
- James Rivera – vocals (2017–present)

=== Past members ===
==== Vocals ====
- Rogue Marechal (1999–2002 / 2012–2015)
- Richie Wicks (2002 / 2005–2009)
- Ronnie Stixx (2003–2005)
- Matt Oakman (2009–2012)

==== Bass guitar ====
- Jim Daley (1999–2000)
- Steve Scott (2001)
- Steve 'SK' Kightley (2002 / 2016)
- Fredrik Englund (2003)
- Mark Fielden (2009–2011, UK live substitute)
- Jack Kirby (2013, UK live substitute)

==== Drums ====
- Russell King (1999)
- Dave Edwards (2000)
- Scott Higham (2001–2002 / 2004 / 2005–2008 / 2013)
- Mauricio Chamucero (2003)
- Mike Pittman (d. 27 August 2007) † (2003 / 2005, US live substitute)
- Lawrence Paterson (2004–2005)
- Omar Hayes (2008–2013 / 2014–2018)
- Tim Churchman (2013)

==== Keyboards ====
- Scot Collins (2008–2011)
- Tim Hall (2013, UK live substitute)

== Discography ==
=== Albums ===
- Corruption Within (2000)
- A Chaos Theory (2002)
- The Hourglass Effect (2008)
- Shadowkeep (2018)

=== EPs ===
- Shadowkeep (1999)

=== Appearances on compilation albums ===
- Dark Tower – track No. 1 on Metal Crusade Vol. 1

(CD compiled by Heavy Oder Was? magazine, 2000)

This track also appears on a number of other compilation albums.

- The Trial of Your Betrayal – track No. 14 on Dynamit Vol. 23

(CD compiled by Rock Hard magazine, 2000)

- Queen of the Reich – track No. 2 on Rebellion: A Tribute to Queensrÿche

(Dwell Records, 2000)

- Believe – track No. 8 on Limb Promo CD Vol. 3

(Limb Music, 2002)

- Fear and Loathing – track No. 15 on Rockdetector: A-Z of Power Metal

(CD provided free with the book A-Z of Power Metal by Garry Sharpe-Young, published by Cherry Red Records in 2003; ISBN 9781901447132)

- Cast Out – track No. 22 on Louder Than the Dragon

(Limb Music, 2004)

- Ten Shades of Black – track No. 7 on ProgPower UK 2006 – Official Festival CD Sampler

(CD given out free to ProgPower UK festival attendees on 25 March 2006)

- Keep It True IV – live footage of Shadowkeep appears on the bonus disc of this DVD release

(Steelpride Records, 2005)
