= Burning Star (album) =

Studio album by Helstar
- Released: March 6, 1984
- Recorded: December 1983 at Sunrise Studios, Houston, Texas
- Genre: Heavy metal
- Length: 35:01
- Label: Combat

Helstar chronology
Burning Star (1984)	Remnants of War (1986)

Professional ratings
Review scores
Source	Rating
Rock Hard	9/10
Metal Forces	9/10

Burning Star is the debut album by American heavy metal band Helstar, released by Combat Records in March 1984. Recorded at Sunrise Studios in the band's hometown of Houston, the original cover features a grim reaper-type of figure in a red robe holding a fireball and scythe. European and subsequent re-releases of the album feature a different cover with a spacecraft exploding.

While the band's later releases leaned more towards a mix of power metal and thrash metal which the band became known for, their debut effort was more akin to traditional heavy metal with inklings of what was to come. The song "Run with the Pack" which ends side one on the original release is one of their most well-known songs and is played at every show.

== Track listing ==
All tracks written by Helstar.

1. "Burning Star" – 3:50
2. "Toward the Unknown" – 4:44
3. "Witch's Eye" – 3:03
4. "Run with the Pack" – 6:38
5. "Leather and Lust" – 3:26
6. "Possession" – 3:28
7. "The Shadows of Iga" – 5:00
8. "Dracula's Castle" – 4:52

== Personnel ==
- James Rivera – vocals
- Larry Barragan – guitars
- Tom Rogers – guitars
- Paul Medina – bass
- Hector Pavon – drums
