= Passage to the Other Side =

Studio album by Seven Witches
- Released: April 8, 2003
- Recorded: 2003
- Studios: Mix-O-Lydian Recording Studio, Lafayette, New Jersey
- Genres: Heavy metal, power metal, thrash metal
- Length: 48:17
- Label: Noise/Sanctuary
- Producers: Jack Frost & Joey Vera

Seven Witches chronology
Xiled to Infinity and One (2002)	Passage to the Other Side (2003)	Year of the Witch (2004)

Professional ratings
Review scores
Source	Rating
AllMusic	2/5 stars

Passage to the Other Side is the 4th studio album by Seven Witches; it's the first album with James Rivera singing, and the album also features bassist Joey Vera from Armored Saint. Many fans consider this release to be the best of them all. The album features a cover of Def Leppard's song "Wasted" from their debut album, On Through the Night.

== Track listing ==
No.	Title	Lyrics	Music	Length
1.	"Dance with the Dead"	James Rivera	Joey Vera	6:20
2.	"Mental Messiah"	Rivera, Jack Frost	Frost	4:59
3.	"Johnny"	Frost	Vera	3:57
4.	"Apocalyptic Dreams"	Rivera	Frost	3:30
5.	"Fever in the City"	Rivera	Vera	5:16
6.	"Betrayed"	Brian Craig, Frost	Frost	4:06
7.	"Last Horizon"	Rivera, Frost	Frost, Vera	4:16
8.	"Nature's Wrath"	Rivera	Vera, Frost	4:51
9.	"Wasted" (Def Leppard cover)	Joe Elliot, Steve Clark	Elliot, Clark	3:42
10.	"Passage to the Other Side"	Frost	Frost	7:20

== Personnel ==
Seven Witches

- James Rivera - vocals
- Jack Frost - guitars, producer, engineer
- Joey Vera - bass, producer, engineer, mixing
- Brian Craig - drums

Production

- Don Sternecker – engineer
