= Winters Bane =

American metal band

- Origin: Akron, Ohio, United States
- Genres: Heavy metal, power metal
- Years active: 1990–present
- Label: DCA
- Members: Lou St. Paul; Bryan G. Morris; Jeff Curenton
- Website: Winters Bane on Facebook

Winters Bane are a heavy/power metal band formed in 1990.

== History ==
They have gone through extensive line-up changes throughout their history with only guitarist and sometime-vocalist Lou St. Paul featuring as an ever-present.

Their first demo featured B.C. Richards on vocals. In their first incarnation with Tim "Ripper" Owens (who would later join Judas Priest and Iced Earth), they released the Heart of a Killer album in 1993, a concept piece based on the murderous exploits of a character called Judge Cohagen. This album was re-released in 2000 by Century Media Records as a two-CD set, featuring a bootlegged live gig as a bonus disc.

After the departure of Owens, St. Paul took over the vocal duties for both the unreleased Season of Brutality and Girth, arguably Winters Bane's heaviest work to date.

Following the release of Girth, Winters Bane went into a period of semi-activity while searching for a full-time vocalist. By 2003, German Alexander Koch (ex-Spiral Tower, Powergod) was recruited and a demo was made. Two years later, St. Paul, Koch and veteran drummer Mark Cross entered the studio to record Redivivus, a full-length album released in 2006.

After the release of the album, Koch and Cross were replaced by locally based Jeff Zaigen and former touring drummer Jeff Curenton and there are plans for a sequel to Heart of a Killer to be released in 2007.

Former members Tim Owens and Dennis Hayes would later form their own band, Beyond Fear, and they released their debut album in 2006. The next year, Hayes would also join Owens in Iced Earth as their new bassist.

As early as December 2007, it was rumored that due to Matt Barlow's reunion with Iced Earth (thus the booting of Tim Owens), Tim Owens would return to Winters Bane as its vocalist. These rumors were confirmed, as it was announced that talks of said reunion are under way. "If the right conditions are met," said guitarist Lou St. Paul, "we would put forth our best effort, making of course a 'killer' album, and do a major tour." The rumors also state this follow-up would be a direct sequel to Heart of a Killer.

== Kill Procedure ==
Lou St. Paul and Jeff Welch also perform with Mike Roberts on drums as Kill Procedure. Songs from Season of Brutality and Girth are performed and both albums are now considered Kill Procedure releases (Girth has now been re-released with the Kill Procedure logo on the cover). Kill Procedure is seen as a parallel project to Winters Bane used to perform heavier music.

== Discography ==
- Demo 91 (1991)
- Demo 1991 (1991)
- Heart of a Killer (1993)
- Season of Brutality (unreleased album) (1995)
- Girth (1997)
- Redivivus (2006)

== Current line-up ==
- Lou St. Paul - guitar (1990–present), vocals (1994-2003), bass (2003-2006)
- Jeff Curenton - drums (2003, 2006–present)
- Bryan G. Morris - bass (2007–present)

== Former members ==
- Vocals:
  - B.C. Richards (1990-1991) (Demo '91)
  - Tim "Ripper" Owens (1991-1994) (Heart of a Killer)
  - Alexander Koch (2003-2006) (Redivivus)
  - Jeff Zaigen (2006-?)
- Guitars:
  - Dwayne Davis (1992) (Heart of a Killer Demo)
  - John "Doomsday" Stevens (?-?)
  - John Comprix (1995, touring bass 1995)
  - Tyler Valendeza (2010-?)
- Bass:
  - Dave Holder (1990-1992) (Demo '91 & Heart of a Killer Demo)
  - Dennis Hayes (1992-1997) (Heart of a Killer & Girth)
  - Ken Stadelman (1997-2003) (Season of Brutality)
- Drums:
  - Terry Salem (1990-1994) (Demo '91 - Heart of a Killer)
  - Todd Bertolette (1994-2003) (Season of Brutality & Girth)
  - Hama Hart (2003-2004)
  - Mark Cross (2004-2006) (Redivivus)

=== Session members ===
- Keyboards:
  - Gerhard Magin (1993) (Heart of a Killer (session))

=== Touring members ===
- Bassists
  - John Comprix (1995, studio guitar 1995)
- Guitarists
  - Dave Hayes (1997)
