= A Distant Thunder (album) =

Studio album by Helstar
- Released: September 29, 1988
- Recorded: Pacific Studios, Venice, California
- Genre: Power metal; heavy metal
- Length: 43:17
- Label: Metal Blade
- Producer: Bill Metoyer

Helstar chronology
Remnants of War (1986)	A Distant Thunder (1988)	Nosferatu (1989)

Professional ratings
Review scores
Source	Rating
AllMusic	link

A Distant Thunder is the third album by American heavy metal band Helstar, released by Metal Blade Records in September 1988, their first album on the label and found the band perfecting their signature mix of power metal and thrash metal. It includes a cover of Scorpions' "He's a Woman, She's a Man", appearing on their 1977 album Taken by Force.

== Track listing ==
All tracks are written by Helstar, except where noted

No.	Title	Length
1.	"The King Is Dead"	4:02
2.	"Bitter End"	4:20
3.	"Abandon Ship"	6:55
4.	"Tyrannicide"	5:29
5.	"Scorcher"	5:49
6.	"Genius of Insanity"	5:01
7.	"(The) Whore of Babylon" (Instrumental)	2:32
8.	"Winds of War"	6:08
9.	"He's a Woman, She's a Man" (Klaus Meine, Rudolph Schenker)	2:53

== Personnel ==
- James Rivera – vocals
- Larry Barragan – guitars
- André Corbin – guitars
- Jerry Abarca – bass, keyboards
- Frank Ferreira – drums
