= Year of the Witch =

Year Of The Witch

Studio album by Seven Witches
- Released: September 2004
- Recorded: 2004
- Genre: Heavy metal, Power metal, Thrash metal
- Length: 41:56
- Label: Sanctuary Records
- Producer: Jack Frost, Don Sternecker

Seven Witches chronology
Passage to the Other Side (2003)	Year Of The Witch (2004)	Amped (2005)

Year Of The Witch is a 2004 album by Seven Witches and the last to feature James Rivera on vocals. The first track, "Metal Asylum" pays homage to the bands that have influenced them, while the final eight tracks form a conceptual narrative revolving around a character named Jacob.

== Track listing ==
1. Metal Asylum (3:54)
2. Year of the Witch (3:56)
3. Fires Below (4:16)
4. Cries of the Living (4:18)
5. If You Were God (4:02)
6. Can't Find My Way (4:31)

Jacob

1. Act 1: Whispers (0:42)
2. Act 2: Voice of Jacob (3:43)
3. Act 3: Mirror to Me (1:17)
4. Act 4: Haunting Dreams (3:52)
5. Act 5: Jacob Speaks (0:04)
6. Act 6: Circles (2:22)
7. Act 7: The Prophet is You (4:37)
8. Act 8: Dream or Reality (0:20)

== Personnel ==
The band

- James Rivera - Vocals
- Jack Frost - Guitars
- Dennis Hayes - Bass

With

- Craig Anderson - Drums
- Eric Ragno - Keyboards & Piano
- Dave Ellefson - Bass on track 5
