= Nosferatu (Helstar album) =

Studio album by Helstar
- Released: 19 November 1989 UK 5 September 1989 Us
- Studio: Rampart Studios, Houston, Texas
- Genre: Power metal; speed metal
- Length: 42:50
- Label: Metal Blade
- Producer: Bill Metoyer

Helstar chronology
A Distant Thunder (1988)	Nosferatu (1989)	Multiples of Black (1995)

Professional ratings
Review scores
Source	Rating
AllMusic	3/5 stars
Metal Storm	9.8/10

Nosferatu is the fourth album by American heavy metal band Helstar, released by Metal Blade Records in November 1989. The first half of the album follows a storyline based on the Bram Stoker novel Dracula and includes audio samples of Frank Langella's performance in John Badham's film adaptation of Dracula. It was the last album recorded by the band before going on hiatus, until reforming in 1995.

== Track listing ==
No.	Title	Length
1.	"Rhapsody in Black"	0:58
2.	"Baptized in Blood"	4:25
3.	"To Sleep, Per Chance to Scream"	4:37
4.	"Harker's Tale (Mass of Death)"	4:26
5.	"Perseverance and Desperation"	4:16
6.	"The Curse Has Passed Away"	5:08
7.	"Benediction"	5:57
8.	"Harsh Reality"	3:15
9.	"Swirling Madness"	4:04
10.	"Von Am Lebem Desto Strum"	1:58
11.	"Aieliaria and Everonn"	3:46

== Personnel ==
- James Rivera – vocals
- Larry Barragan – guitar
- André Corbin – guitar, keyboards
- Jerry Abarca – bass, piano, keyboards
- Frank Ferreira – drums
