= Beyond Fear =

American heavy metal band

- Origin: Akron, Ohio, United States
- Genres: Heavy metal, thrash metal, power metal
- Years active: 2005–present
- Label: SPV
- Members: Tim "Ripper" Owens; John Comprix; Dennis Hayes; Eric Elkins
- Past members: Dwayne Bihary
- Website: http://timripperowens.com

Beyond Fear is an American heavy metal band started in March, 2005 by Tim "Ripper" Owens after he left Judas Priest as a side-project, apart from his former work with Iced Earth.

== History ==
The band started to satisfy Owens' desire to write songs on a heavy metal album, which he could not fulfill in his previous projects. Owens and guitarist John Comprix.split the songwriting. A demo was recorded after a month, and the debut album was released about a year later. Later on the same year as their debut album was released guitarist Dwayne Bihary quit the band, with the reasons being kept private.

Owens commented on Beyond Fear's next studio album in an interview with Metal Asylum: "It will always be classic metal but I think a lot of the later songs that we recorded for the debut, like “Scream Machine”, became favorites for fans. And lyrics to a song like that were not so serious and more cliché metal lyrics, you know about a metal machine (laughs), so I think some of the new songs may go in that direction. We are still gonna have songs like “Save Me” but I think it will probably have some more aggression. We have been writing now, John Comprix and I, for a while, I have a lot of ideas and melodies in my head that I really can’t use anywhere else (laughs). Its nice I get to use em for Beyond Fear. I mean I have been a writer for many years but I don’t get to do it as much as I would like and Iced Earth just keeps me so busy but its nice that every once and [sic] a while I get to do my thing with Beyond Fear. And we get to take our time with this band and practice together. I mean that’s what I want to hear with all my influences on one album that’s what I like to do with Fear."

== Band members ==
- Tim "Ripper" Owens - vocals (2005–present)
- John Comprix - lead & rhythm guitar (2005–present)
- Dennis Hayes - bass (2005–present)
- Eric Elkins - drums (2005–present)

=== Former members ===
- Dwayne Bihary - rhythm guitar (2005–2006)

== Discography ==
- Beyond Fear (2006)

== See also ==
- Iced Earth
- Judas Priest
- Seven Witches
- Winter's Bane
- Yngwie Malmsteen
