= Overlorde =

American heavy metal band

Overlorde is an American heavy metal band.

== History ==
Hailing from New Jersey, the band was active in the 1980s. After releasing a self-titled record in 1987, the band became inactive before being reformed in 2000. The three original members Mark "M.E." Edwards (guitar), John "Kong" Bunucci (bass) and Dave Wrenn (drums) recruited singer Bobby Lucas from Seven Witches. Following the demo Overlorde 2000, they would return with an album Return of the Snow Giant after signing with the Greek label Sonic Age.

After a period with Chris Colfax on vocals, Lucas returned in 2009. George Tsalikis took over vocal duties in November 2016.

== Reception ==
Powermetal.de viewed Return of the Snow Giant as a "masterclass in heavy metal". Managing to sound "fresh" despite being firmly rooted in the 1980s—Overlorde also carried over some songs from that period—the album culminated in "epic anthems". Rock Hard bestowed a 8.5 out of 10 grade on the album, finding the songs powerful and "always captivating". Norway's Scream Magazine gave 4 out of 6 points, docking points for unevenness in quality, but rewarding points when the band reached the "epic" level. The singer "Lucas is among the better American vocalists at the moment", the reviewer added. Vampster found similar "epic" moments, played by "awesome musicians" for a "thoroughly recommendable" album, "a must-have for any fan of 80s US power metal", with "fantastic artwork" too.

A whole 19 years passed until the release of Overlorde's third album. Titled Awaken the Fury, it came out on No Remorse Records. Rock Hard rated this almost equally to the previous, as an 8. Metal.de drew attention to the "quirky and bass-heavy tone" on the album, and the "quirky, epic, progressive, and offbeat" songwriting. Though there still were "catchy sections", overall the album was "a tough nut to crack" and not "easily digestible". The score was 7. The main review by Powermetal.de resulted in a 9 out of 10 score; the album was different from their previous one in their "epic, quirky" style. There were however members of the staff who lowered their score to 5.5. Scream Magazine was also on the reserved side, only giving 3 out of 6. It was harder getting into, setting a dark tone with relative complexity; there was "minimal songs you sing along to after two-three listens". The production was also a bit lacking and "angular".

== Discography ==
- Overlorde (EP, Strike Zone Records, 1987)
- Return of the Snow Giant (Sonic Age Records, 2004)
- Awaken the Fury (No Remorse Records, 2023)
