= Death row (disambiguation) =

Death row most commonly refers to the section of a prison where inmates await execution, or the state of awaiting execution ("being on death row").

Death row or Deathrow may also refer to:

== In film and television ==
- Deathrow (film), a 2000 film produced by GMA Films
- On Death Row, British TV series by Werner Herzog

== In games ==
- Deathrow (video game), a 2002 alternative sports video game for Xbox
- DeathRow, a Quake esports team featuring first pro online gamer Dennis Fong

== In music ==
=== Artists and labels ===
- Death Row Records, a record label started by Dr. Dre and Marion "Suge" Knight
- Deathrow (band), a German thrash metal group

=== Works ===
- Death Row (album), an album by Accept
- Death Row Greatest Hits, a greatest hits album by Death Row Records
- Death Row: Snoop Doggy Dogg at His Best, a greatest hits album by Snoop Dogg
- "Death Row", a song by Judas Priest from Jugulator
- "Death Row" (song), a song by Thomas Rhett, featuring Tyler Hubbard, and Russell Dickerson
- "Death Row", a song by Bebe Rexha from Better Mistakes
- "Death Row", a song by Chris Stapleton from From A Room: Volume 1
- "Death Row", a song by Young Dolph from Rich Slave
- "Deathrow (No Regrets)", a song by Hypocrisy, from Into the Abyss

== See also ==
- List of death row inmates in the United States
- Murderers' Row
