= Xiled to Infinity and One =

Studio album by Seven Witches
- Released: April 30, 2002
- Recorded: 2001
- Studio: Mix-O-Lydian Studios, Lafayette, New Jersey
- Genre: Power metal
- Length: 46:21
- Label: Noise
- Producer: Jack Frost, Joey Vera, Don Sternecker

Seven Witches chronology
City of Lost Souls (2000)	Xiled to Infinity and One (2002)	Passage to the Other Side (2003)

Professional ratings
Review scores
Source	Rating
AllMusic	2/5 stars

Xiled to Infinity and One is an album released in 2002 by the American heavy metal band Seven Witches.

== Track listing ==
All tracks written by Wade Black and Jack Frost, except "The Burning" by Frost and Jon Oliva and "See You in Hell" by Nick Bowcott and Steve Grimmett.

1. "Metal Tyrant" – 4:07
2. "Incubus" – 5:21
3. "Salvation" – 3:30
4. "Xiled to Infinity and One" – 5:49
5. "Warmth of Winter" – 4:17
6. "Anger's Door" – 5:03
7. "Eyes of an Angel" – 4:37
8. "Pain" – 3:47
9. "The Burning (Incubus Reprise)" – 5:22
10. "See You in Hell" – 4:23 (Grim Reaper cover)

== Personnel ==
Seven Witches

- Wade Black – lead vocals
- Jack Frost – guitars, backing vocals, producer, engineer, mixing
- Billy Mez – bass
- Brian Craig – drums

Guest musicians

- Jon Oliva – lead vocals on "The Burning"
- Joe Comeau – duet vocals on "See You in Hell" and intro solo on "Salvation"

Production

- Don Sternecker – co-producer, engineer
- Joey Vera – co-producer, engineer, mixing
- Tommy Hansen – mastering at Jailhouse Studios
- Jean-Pascal Fournier – cover art
