= Dead Brain Cells =

Canadian thrash metal band

- Also known as: DBC
- Origin: Montreal, Quebec, Canada
- Genres: Thrash metal; technical thrash metal; crossover thrash
- Years active: 1986–1991; 2002–present
- Label: Combat
- Members: Eddie Shahini; Phil Dakin; Armen Apekian; Jimmy Antle
- Past members: Gerry Ouellette; Jeff St. Louis; Marc Prévost; Jason Quinn; Graham Ferguson; Bill Thompson; Eric Marsan; Louis Levesque
- Website: http://www.dbcuniverse.com

Dead Brain Cells, often abbreviated as DBC, are a Canadian thrash metal band that was initially active from 1986 to 1991, and they have reunited occasionally since the early 2000s.

== History ==
Called DBC for short, the band started in 1985 in Montreal as a small project named Final Chapter by guitar players Eddie Shahini and Gerry Ouellette, who put an ad in a magazine looking for a drummer. In 1986, former Vomit and the Zits singer Dave Javex Ray-O-Vac (David Leone) and former Unruled and Vomit and the Zits drummer Jeff Saint-Louis, joined with Shahini and Ouellette and guitar player Phil Dakin, who switched to bass. The project grew into a serious band which took the name Dead Brain Cells among three suggestions by Leone, the others being "The Mental Pukes" and "The Retarded Assholes". Leone had made commitments to his job and could not sing with the band anymore; instead of replacing him, Dakin decided he would sing and play bass at the same time.

DBC released two albums and toured in mostly Canada and the United States, playing with bands such as Slayer, Metal Church, Death, Cannibal Corpse, Lȧȧz Rockit, the Crumbsuckers, Agnostic Front, Bad Brains, Nomeansno, Blind Illusion, Ludichrist, Zoetrope, Detente and Groovy Aardvark, as well as their Canadian thrash metal peers Voivod, Sacrifice, Razor and Obliveon. The band's first album, Dead Brain Cells, was released in 1987, followed two years later by a concept album, Universe. Musically and lyrically, those two albums are different from each other; Dead Brain Cells had a crossover thrash edge, featuring songs about politics and society in general (laced with humor), while Universe was considerably more of a technical/progressive thrash metal record and its lyrical themes focus more on science fiction as opposed to the lyrical content of its predecessor.

Other than playing live relentlessly, and a music video for "The Genesis Explosion" (from Universe) receiving considerable airplay on MusiquePlus, DBC never got the success other thrash metal bands achieved. The band called it quits in 1991 while working on a third album that never surfaced, but they have since reunited occasionally, and have new music in the works.

Their song, "The Genesis Explosion", was featured in a Canadian television commercial for Microcell Telecommunications in 2005. The commercial depicts an older woman using her cell phone to win a radio call-in show.

The band's guitarist, Gerry Ouellette, died on November 12, 1994. Original DBC drummer Jeff St. Louis died on December 22, 2019, which happened to be his 61st birthday.

Shahini formed a new band in 2009 called Kill of Rights, it includes music written from 1986 to 2013. They released their first album Sign of the Crimes on February 15, 2014.

DBC released their first new songs in 35 years, "Pendulum" and "Sirens", on July 2, 2024.

== Discography ==
- Dead Brain Cells (1987)
  1. "Deadlock"
  2. "Monument"
  3. "Lies"
  4. "Power and Corruption"
  5. "Tempest"
  6. "Public Suicide"
  7. "Negative Reinforcement"
  8. "Outburst"
  9. "M.I.A."
  10. "Terrorist Mind"
  11. "The Vice"
  12. "Trauma X"
  13. "Final Act"
- Universe (1989)
  1. "The Genesis Explosion"
  2. "Heliosphere"
  3. "Primordium"
  4. "Exit the Giants"
  5. "Rise of Man"
  6. "Estuary"
  7. "Humanity's Child"
  8. "Phobos and Deimos"
  9. "Threshold"
  10. "Infinite Universe"
- Unreleased (1995)
  1. "Third Coming"
  2. "Brick by Brick"
  3. "Siren's Song"
  4. "Waste Not, Want More"
  5. "Rude Awakening"
  6. "Root to All Evil"
- Singles (2024)
  1. "Pendulum"
  2. "Sirens"
