= The Bronx Casket Co. =

American gothic metal band

The Bronx Casket Company
- Origin: New York City, U.S.
- Genres: Gothic metal, heavy metal, groove metal
- Years active: 1999–present
- Labels: The Music Cartel (1999–2003); Candlelight Records (2005–)
- Members: D.D. Verni; Jack Frost; Charlie Calv; Rob Pallotta
- Past members: Myke Hideous; Tim Mallare

The Bronx Casket Co. is an American gothic metal band from New York City. They were formed in 1999 by Overkill bassist D.D. Verni. The band's music features a blend of gothic metal and traditional heavy metal.

== History ==
Their first release was titled The Bronx Casket Company, and was met with good reviews.

2001 saw the release of their second full-length release, Sweet Home Transylvania, which was met with the same enthusiasm. Although the band had never played a live show, fan interest continued to grow with songs like "Jesus Doesn't Live Here Anymore", "The Other Me" and "Black Valentine".

Allegedly, the only time the whole band were in the same room together was to shoot the promo photos for the album. Each member recorded his own part in a different studio as to accommodate their commitments to their other bands.

The strength of the songs on the band's second release caught the ear of playwright Andrea Lepcio. Soon after, Verni and Lepcio were collaborating with three-time Tony Winner Hinton Battle to direct and choreograph, and the seeds of The Bronx Casket Co… A New Musical were planted. Verni recruited several members from the Trans-Siberian Orchestra to perform the show's music and, likewise, when the cast consisted of performers from Broadway shows Hairspray, Rent and Dance of the Vampires. There have been several performances off-Broadway for producers/backers and the show is still in the writing stages. It has a gothic/Broadway score with a twisted love story woven throughout. Songs from the first two Bronx Casket Co. releases are included in the show, as well as 13 new songs Verni penned just for the musical.

2005 marked the release of Hellectric, their first CD with new label Regain Records, their third full-length CD. "It takes three records I think", states Verni, "to really decide what a band is going to be". Hellectric is a blend of the more doom sound of the first release with the more metal sound of the second. It was produced and engineered by Verni at his New Jersey–based Gear Recording Studio.

Long-time friend Michael Romeo of Symphony X contributed all the orchestrations as well as co-mixing the record with Verni. Songs like "Little Dead Girl" and "Sherimoon" are catchy, while others like "Bleed With Me" and "Can't Stop The Rain" show the band using more orchestral arrangements and finesse. The record includes a Goth rendition of the Lynyrd Skynyrd hit "Free Bird" – "If you're going to do a cover tune, you may as well defile a classic" states Verni.

Hellectric also marks the first video from the band. Directed by Lee Lanier at Beezubugbit Studios in Las Vegas, "Little Dead Girl" is in the vein of Tim Burton's immortal The Nightmare Before Christmas.

Hideous and Mallare left the band. Rob Pallotta became their new drummer, and Verni took over the role as lead singer. A new album was scheduled for release March 29, 2009, but was delayed until 2011.

== Personnel ==
- D.D. Verni – bass, lead vocals, guitars
- Jack Frost – guitars
- Charlie Calv – keyboards
- Rob Pallotta – drums

=== Former members ===
- Myke Hideous – lead vocals
- Tim Mallare – drums

== Discography ==
- 1999: Bronx Casket Company
- 2001: Sweet Home Transylvania
- 2005: Hellectric
- 2011: Antihero
- 2020: The Complete Collection (compilation)
