= Steve Sledje =

- Born: June 2, 1965 (age 61)
- Occupations: Singer/songwriter, guitarist
- Member of: Hellstrum

Steve Sledje (born June 2, 1965) is the singer/songwriter and guitarist of the death metal band Hellstrum. Commonly called Sledje, he has pioneered a melding of industrial and metal styles that employs a death growl vocal style. His lyrics are at times dark and mystic on a backdrop of fast, shredding guitar chords and solos.

== Early years ==
Sledje grew up in Indianapolis, Indiana. After attending Butler University as a music student, Sledje left for Berklee College of Music where he enjoyed a summer session in Boston, Massachusetts. This marked the beginning of a thirteen-year residency in Boston during which time he joined the bands Hit Squad and Tommy Gun. After those projects ended, Sledje organized his own band Stampede Machine. They released their debut CD Hostile Environment in 1995. The CD was distributed internationally and can occasionally be found for sale on the Internet albeit at high prices. The band reportedly dissolved in 1997 or 1998 before the completed recording their second release.

== Colorado years ==
Sledje began writing and recording on his own, and in 1999, he moved to Colorado Springs where he began collaboration with local musicians. At the same time, he developed an interest in private music instruction which he was continuing as of 2009. While in Colorado, Sledje has played and recorded with many bands including Power Tribe and Dirtnap. He also recorded a solo collection of acoustic songs in 2004.

== Hellstrum years ==
After experimenting with a wide range of styles and genres, he founded his current band with friend and drummer Mike Pittman. The Hellstrum project started in 2006 and offered a unique combination of industrial, metal, and gothic styles. Tragically, Mike Pittman died in August 2007 at the same time as Hellstrum's first release, the self-released EP, Chronicles Volume One. The band continued with some personnel changes and the current lineup includes Sledje on lead vocals and guitar, Jack Aragon on lead guitar, Brent Wagner on bass guitar, and Dino Cuneo on drums. Hellstrum has since released Chronicles Volume Two and continues to record in preparation for a future release.

== Personal life ==
In recent years, Sledje has become a mentor to other musicians, a proponent of experimental music, and an outspoken advocate for gun owners.
