= Beyond Fear (album) =

Studio album by Beyond Fear
- Released: May 8, 2006
- Recorded: Morrisound Studios, U.S.
- Genre: Thrash metal, heavy metal, power metal
- Length: 47:12
- Label: Steamhammer/SPV
- Producer: Jim Morris

Professional ratings
Review scores
Source	Rating
AllMusic	3.5/5 stars
Jukebox:Metal	4.5/5 stars
PiercingMetal	9/10 stars

Beyond Fear is the debut album by Beyond Fear, a heavy metal band formed by ex-Iced Earth/ex-Judas Priest vocalist Tim Owens.

== Track listing ==
No.	Title	Writer(s)	Length
1.	"Scream Machine"	John Comprix, Tim "Ripper" Owens	5:33
2.	"And... You Will Die"	Comprix, Owens	3:42
3.	"Save Me"	Owens	3:57
4.	"The Human Race"	Comprix, Owens	3:36
5.	"Coming at You"	Owens	3:14
6.	"Dreams Come True"	Comprix, Owens	4:42
7.	"Telling Lies"	Comprix, Owens	3:21
8.	"I Don't Need This"	Owens	3:30
9.	"Words of Wisdom"	Comprix, Owens	3:47
10.	"My Last Words"	Owens	3:24
11.	"Your Time Has Come"	Comprix, Owens	4:49
12.	"The Faith"	Owens	3:37

== Personnel ==
Beyond Fear

- Tim "Ripper" Owens – vocals
- John Comprix – lead and rhythm guitar
- Dwane Bihary – rhythm guitar
- Dennis Hayes – bass
- Eric Elkins – drums

Production

- Produced, engineered, and mastered by Jim Morris
- Assistant engineering – Ryan Yanero
- Artwork – Jeremy Morgan
- Photography – Craig James, Jenni James
- Booklet design – Sandra Hiltmann
