= Disaster Area (band) =

- Origin: Berlin, Germany
- Genres: Skate-punk
- Years active: 1980s - 2000s
- Labels: Bonzen Records, Noise Records, Musicflash, Polgar
- Spinoff of: C&A

Disaster Area is a German punk band who have been around since the 1980s. They were in the Skate-punk genre.

== Background ==
They were described by Pushead in Maximum Rocknroll as "Probably the first German skate-oriented band". Among the bands in Berlin trying to make a go of it, Disaster Area began in the 1980s. The nucleus of the group was the Thummerer brothers who started out as C&A. They didn't rehearse much and hardly played any gigs. The legacy of this band is just some songs on two tape samplers.

The name for this group came from watching Hitchhiker's Guide to the Galaxy which featured a band called Disaster Area, the loudest band in the universe.

They were described by Burn Your Ears as five guys dabbling in the Skate-punk genre who caused a stir in the late 1980s.

They went through a series of lineup changes. By 1992 the lineup comprised Naughty on vocals, Norman on lead guitar, Scheune on guitar and vocals, Marky on bass and vocals, and Frusty on drums. They were then veteran punk musicians.

== Career ==
In 1984/85 Disaster Area had a shared release with Die Schlimmen Finger on EP, Skate Tonight / Rebels with Horst. The Disaster Area contributions were, "Skate To-Nite" and "Realität". The review by Puszone was good with the reviewer saying that "Skate Tonight" was a new skate anthem, and they brought forth a "distinct character of song stylings that strives to please". Maximum Rocknroll said that Disaster area didn't thrash but gave a powerful assault with lots of choruses, and they had a Misfits appeal.

In the beginning of 1988, they started work on their second album, Back from the Reservation which they produced and financed themselves. With only five days to have to record and mix the album, they completed it, and it was released on the Berlin-based Bonzen Records label.

The group played at the Skate'n'Roll Festival on 14 August 1988. The drummer Oli got an ear injury which resulted in ringing sounds and headaches. He left the band and Berlin for Australia.

In 1994, they released their Shred Ready fourteen-track album on the Bonzen Records label.

In 1997, they released their single, "Powder" on Bonzen DAR 0816.

In 1998, they released their Slam Selection album on Noise Records. According to laut.de, they, themselves appeared on the album in various skating aspects. Now with the band signed to a major label, they undertook a tour with CIA and they played some gigs with Millencolin, and they also performed at various skating contests.

In 2002, the Berlin Punk Rock 1977-1989 compilation was released on Weird System 44. Their song "Skate Tonight" was included on CD 2.

In 2005, the group picked up where they left off. Their seventh album Forever contained sixteen tracks of varying tempos that are of the punk-skate genre. A review by Robert for Burn Your Ears said that the album had passages that were pleasing because they were straight forward, and the vocals were good. He also said that there was a certain catchiness in songs like "Mobile". But he said that "Skateboard" wasn't necessary and spoilt the overall impression of the album. He finished off with saying that it was an album that one could take or leave. Power Metal's review on the album was positive with the reviewer saying it gets better with every spin. The reviewer also said that the band wasn't interested in pseudo-intellectual lyrics, they simply let the music do the talking. It was also reviewed in Plastic Bomb.
