= Dave Sharman =

English guitarist

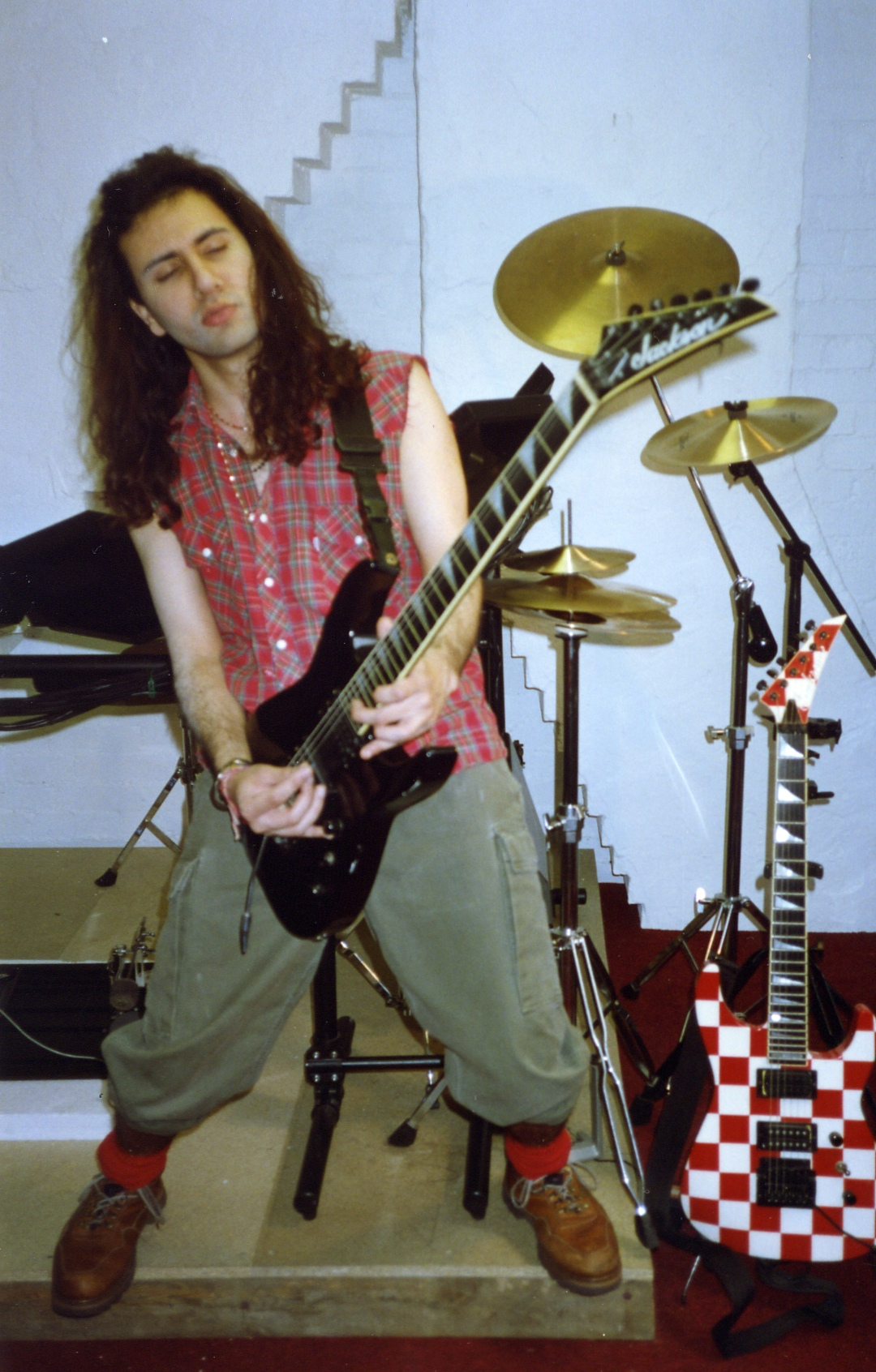
- Dave Sharman

Background information
- Born: 10 September; West Midlands, England
- Genres: Instrumental rock, rock, progressive rock, metal, fusion
- Occupations: Musician, singer-songwriter, record producer
- Instruments: Guitar, vocals, keyboards, bass, drums
- Years active: Since 1990; 36 years ago
- Labels: Cry of Hope Music, Noise Records, Bleeding Hearts
- Website: davesharman.com

Dave Sharman (born 10 September, West Midlands, England) is an English guitarist, singer-songwriter, whose primary genre is rock and metal. He is also a multi-instrumentalist and record producer.

== Career ==
Sharman started to teach himself to play the guitar at the age of nine. His influences include: Eddie Van Halen, Alex Lifeson of Rush, Neal Schon of Journey, Tom Scholz of Boston and Allen Collins of Lynyrd Skynyrd, however, he possesses his own easily recognizable style.

Sharman was given his musical break by rock DJ Tommy Vance who invited him to perform a session on the BBC Radio 1 Friday Rock Show, which Vance used to host. Vance had listened to a 4 track demo tape that the teenage Sharman had sent him. The Rock Show was for many years the UK's top source for rock and heavy metal, each week the show had a studio session or live performance and had featured artists such as Led Zeppelin, Deep Purple, Uriah Heep, Rush and Genesis to name but a few.

The session was recorded at the BBC's Maida Vale Studios in London and a band featuring Don Airey (ex-Rainbow, Ozzy Osbourne, Whitesnake and Deep Purple keyboardist), drummer Neil Huxtable and bassist Martin Connolly was assembled to back Sharman's guitar work.

The session was broadcast in 1989 with four original instrumental tracks: "Pandora's Box", "Flight 212", "Spellbinder" and "Torch The Tower", all written by the teenage Sharman. During the airing of the session Tommy Vance sounded out record labels for the prodigy.

Two of Sharman's instrumental tracks, "Trucker" and "Frantic", were used for a number of years by the Friday Rock Show as its official chart countdown and news music.

=== 1990 and the instrumental years (1990–1992) ===
A record deal with then-major metal label Noise Records followed on the back of the BBC session and Sharman's debut instrumental guitar album 1990 was recorded over a two-week period at Berlin's Skytrak studios in Germany and released worldwide.

All eight tracks were written by Sharman, in addition to which he played guitars, bass and keyboards.

As part of its marketing strategy the record label put stickers on the LPs, which read "Europe's Answer to Joe Satriani". The album 1990 received significant critical acclaim from the mainstream music press including: Kerrang Magazine, Metal Hammer, Guitar for the Practicing Musician and Raw Magazine among others. Sharman was nominated for Guitar for the Practicing Musicians: 'Guitar God in waiting'.

Sharman's guitar work also caught the attention of Deep Purple frontman Ian Gillan, who at the time was working on a solo album. Sharman was recruited by Gillan to lay down the guitar parts on a number of tracks on his solo project.

Night of the Guitars II Tour: Around the same time, Police and Sting manager, Miles Copeland III was finalizing the lineup for the Night of the Guitars II tour, the first tour had featured guitarists: Steve Howe of Yes, Robby Krieger of The Doors, Alvin Lee, Steve Hunter, Randy California and Leslie West of Mountain. The line-up for the second version featured Ronnie Montrose of 1970s rockers Montrose, Robin Trower formally of Procol Harum, Focus's Jan Akkerman, Rick Derringer, Saga's Ian Crichton and Laurie Wisefield of Wishbone Ash and Tina Turner. Sharman was invited to complete the tour line-up. Kick starting in Marseille France, the eight guitarists performed to over 200,000 people across five countries. Carlton Media released the tour on DVD. The final show wound up in London and afterwards Sharman set to work on his second studio album Exit Within.

=== Exit Within – initial transition to song-based work (1992–1994) ===
Sharman's second studio album saw a move away from pure instrumental guitar work and began to take a more song-based approach. The ten-track album featured four vocal tracks: Man, Home, Cos You're A Woman and Attitude, once again all the material was written by Sharman.

German Thomas Brache was recruited by Sharman to take on lead vocals with Sharman providing the backing vocals. Sharman invited Neil Murray who had previously played with Black Sabbath, Whitesnake and Brian May to play bass on Exit Within.

Once again Sharman's work received significant critical acclaim from the music press, with Sean Tyler from Kerrang magazine saying Sharman had done well to avoid the pitfalls that so often befall the guitar based artist and that with a concerted effort he may yet rewrite the rulebook.

=== Here 'n Now – further transition to song-based work (1994) ===
On his third album Sharman retained Thomas Brache on lead vocals with production duties handed to Kit Woolven, who had produced classic acts such as Thin Lizzy and UFO.

The album also saw Sharman further transition to song-based work, the ten-track album, all written by Sharman, however, did include three instrumentals as a throwback to his instrumental days.

=== Wave – taking on vocals (1996–2000) ===
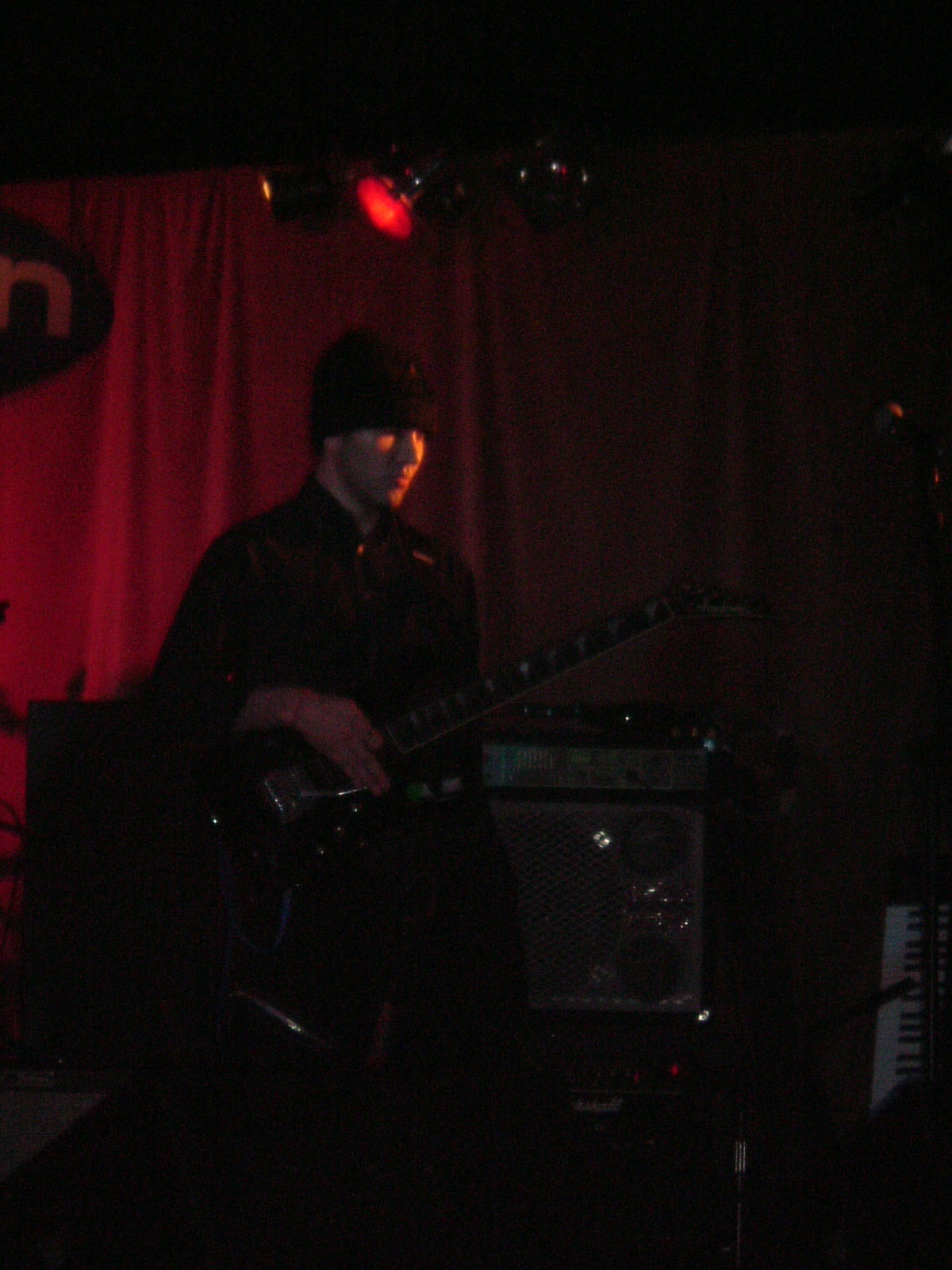
Dave Sharman at a London gig

Thomas Brache and Sharman parted ways after the production of Here 'n Now and Sharman who had always featured on backing vocals took on the role of lead vocals alongside guitar and production. Sharman along with his band became the power trio Wave and toured the UK extensively.

The music took on more of a grunge-based influence.

Work also started on a self-titled album. Duran Duran producer Colin Thurston took on the role of co-producer.

The Wave album was never officially released as Sharman always considered the album to be a collection of demos.

=== Reinvention and return (2011) ===
Sharman features in Hal Leonard Publishing's Legends of Rock Guitar – The Essential Reference of Rock's Greatest Guitarists as being England's sole shred champ, who released a killer guitar album called 1990. The publication, authored by Pete Prown and H.P. Newquist, is a virtual encyclopedia of great electric-guitar players with 35 chapters examining over 300 major figures in every style across the decades.

After years under various management and labels, and trying to find a balance between his guitar playing alongside his songwriting and vocals, Sharman is under new management, has a new label, and is now a guitarist, singer-songwriter.

=== New studio album – Evolution Machine (2013) ===
Sharman's fourth studio album, Evolution Machine was released on 18 March 2013, on which he is the singer-songwriter and also playing all instruments alongside guitar. The album is also self-produced.

=== Playing style ===
Sharman started out as a child prodigy and is often called a guitar virtuoso.

=== Equipment ===
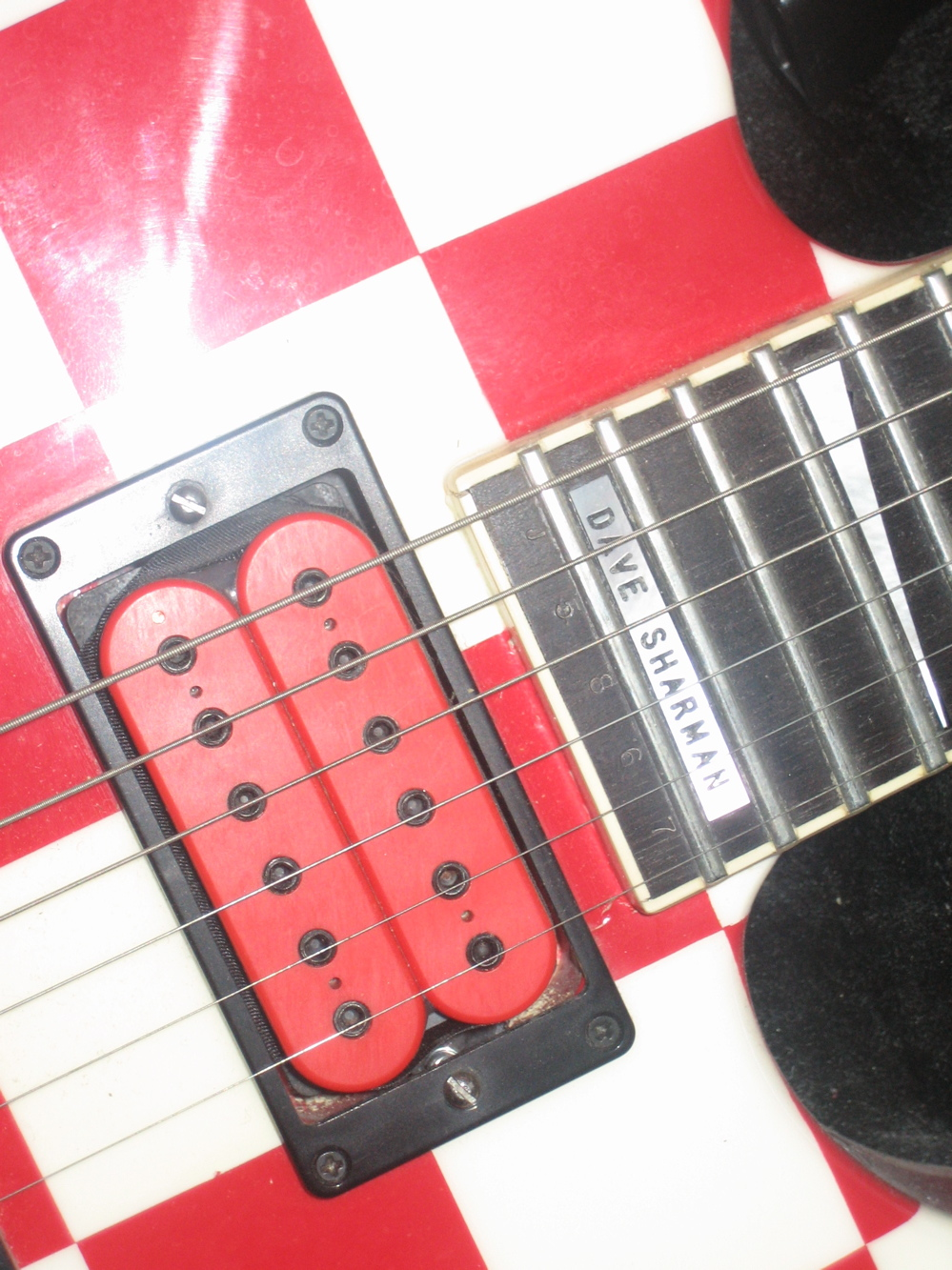
One of Dave Sharman's checkerboard Jackson soloist custom guitars

Sharman has been an endorser and continues to play Jackson Guitars and the checkerboard-finish guitars that the company custom built for him early on in his career remain his signature guitars. He continues to feature as a Jackson Guitars Artist alongside other British guitarists such as Iron Maiden's Adrian Smith and Def Leppard's Rick Savage.

He also has been an official endorser and continues to use DiMarzio pickups.

Sharman is an official Rotosound Strings endorser.

In the past he has also endorsed Hohner. & Washburn Guitars.

=== Discography ===
- 1990 – 1990
- Exit Within – 1991
- Here 'n' Now – 1994
- Wave (unreleased)
- The Best of Dave Sharman – Vol I – 2007
- The Best of Dave Sharman – Vol II – 2007
- Evolution Machine – 2013 release

== See also ==
- List of guitarists
- List of people from London
- List of record producers
- List of singer-songwriters
- British rock music
- Culture of London
