= Heart of a Killer =

Studio album by Winter's Bane
- Released: 1993
- Recorded: January 1993
- Studio: Commusication Studio, Frankenthal, Germany
- Genre: Heavy metal, power metal
- Length: 49:18
- Label: Massacre
- Producer: Torsten Hartman

Winter's Bane chronology
Heart of a Killer (1993)	Season of Brutality (1995)

Professional ratings
Review scores
Source	Rating
AllMusic	3/5 stars
Collector's Guide to Heavy Metal	7/10
Rock Hard	8.0/10

Heart of a Killer is Winter's Bane's debut album, released in 1993. It is a partial concept album, with the first six songs detailing the story of a judge who sentences a murderer to death, and soon afterwards has his heart replaced with the killer's in a transplant operation.

Heart of a Killer was re-released by Century Media in 2000, featuring a bonus disc comprising a live recording from a radio broadcast and a demo. A live recording of the band performing as the Judas Priest tribute band British Steel was submitted to Judas Priest by someone who knew the band, convincing them to hire Tim "Ripper" Owens as a replacement for Rob Halford in 1996.

== Track listing ==
All songs written by Lou St. Paul, except for where noted.

1. "Wages of Sin" (Tim Owens, St. Paul) – 6:28
2. "Blink of an Eye" (Owens, St. Paul) – 3:59
3. "Heart of a Killer" – 4:24
4. "Horror Glances" – 5:01
5. "The Silhouette" – 4:34
6. "Reflections Within" (Owens, St. Paul) – 5:41
7. "Haunted House" – 3:49
8. "Nightshade" (Owens, St. Paul) – 5:17
9. "Winters Bane" (Winter's Bane) – 4:33
10. "Cleansing Mother" – 5:28

== 2000 re-issue bonus disc ==
Live at Ron's Crossroads, Akron, Ohio, Christmas 1993

1. "Wages of Sin"
2. "Blink of an Eye"
3. "Heart of a Killer"
4. "Horror Glances"
5. "The Silhouette"
6. "Reflections Within"
7. "Haunted House"
8. "Fear of Death"
9. "Cleansing Mother"

Demo 1991

1. "My Daggers Revenge"
2. "Eyes of the Deceiver"
3. "Seven Nations"

== Credits ==
- Tim Owens – vocals
- Lou St. Paul – rhythm, lead and acoustic guitars
- Dennis Hayes – bass
- Terry Salem – drums

Additional musicians

- Gerhard Magin – keyboards

Production

- Torsten Hartman – producer
- Joe Kleas – live recording
- Andreas Marschall – cover art
