= The Northern Territories =

Electronic music project from Sweden

The Northern Territories was an electronic music project from Sweden. It was started in Uppsala in 1992 by John Alexander Ericson (vocals, instruments and electronics) and Stefan Sääf (vocals and electronics). Musically this group centred on synthpop, their first two releases came on German label Machinery Records. Later their music became more guitar influenced. John Alexander Ericson started a solo career after their disbanding.

== Discography ==
The Northern Territories

- 1994 – Midnight Ambulance (CD, Machinery)
- 1994 – Midnight Ambulance (CDM, Machinery)
- 1997 – Orange Moon (CD, Visage)
- 1999 – Satellite People (CD, Nova Tekk)

John Alexander Ericson

- 2004 – Songs For Quiet Souls (CD, Rosegarden)
- 2005 – Savannah Songs (CD, Warsaw)
- 2005 – Essentials Of The Northern Territories (CD, UpScene)
- 2006 – Black Clockworks (CD, Kalinkaland)
- 2010 – Songs From The White Sea (CD, MIG)
