= Redivivus =

Studio album by Winters Bane
- Released: April 11, 2006
- Genres: Heavy metal Power metal
- Length: 42:26
- Labels: DCA Recordings; Spiritual Beast Records (Japan); Irond Records (Russia)
- Producers: Chris Tsangarides & Curran Murphy

Winters Bane chronology
Girth (1997)	Redivivus (2006)

Professional ratings
Review scores
Source	Rating
Metal.de	6/10 stars
Rock Hard	8/10 stars
Scream Magazine	5/6 stars
Vampster	
Powermetal.de	

Redivivus is Winters Bane's third album, released on April 11, 2006 by DCA Recordings.

== Track listing ==
1. "Seal the Light" - 4:53
2. "Spark to Flame" - 5:29
3. "The World" - 4:19
4. "Dead Faith" - 4:24
5. "Catching the Sun" - 4:50
6. "Remember to Forget" - 4:17
7. "Burning Bridges" - 4:32
8. "Waves of Fury" - 4:39
9. "Despise the Lie" - 3:32

=== European Bonus Tracks ===
10. "Catching the Sun" - 4:36
11. "Remember to Forget" - 4:18
12. "Seal the Light" - 4:37
13. "Furies" - 4:44

These songs are demo versions taken from "Demo 2003".

== Credits ==
- Alex Koch - Vocals
- Lou St. Paul - Guitar/Bass
- Mark Cross - Drums
