= Secrecy (band) =

Secrecy is power/progressive metal group from Bremen, Germany. Founded in 1987, they notably released two albums on Noise Records.

== Discography ==
- Like Burning One's Boats (demo, 1988)
- Art in Motion (1990, Noise Records)
- Raging Romance (1991, Noise Records)
- Set the Sails (demo, 1992)
