= Amped (Seven Witches album) =

Studio album by Seven Witches
- Released: October 2005
- Recorded: 2005
- Genre: Heavy metal
- Length: 40:30
- Label: Regain Records
- Producer: Jack Frost

Seven Witches chronology
Year of the Witch (2004)	Amped (2005)	Deadly Sins (2007)

Professional ratings
Review scores
Source	Rating
AllMusic	3/5 stars

Amped is the fourth studio album by Seven Witches, and the first to feature vocalist Alan Tecchio, bassist Kevin Bolembach, and drummer Jeff Curenton.

== Track listing ==
All lyrics and music by Alan Tecchio and Jack Frost respectively

1. West Nile (3:44) - inspired by the West Nile virus
2. Sunnydale High (4:18) - inspired by Buffy the Vampire Slayer
3. Dishonor Killings (4:22) - inspired by Honor killing
4. GP Fix (3:40) - inspired by MotoGP
5. Be (4:53)
6. Fame Gets You Off (6:04)
7. Flesh For Fantasy (Billy Idol) (4:30)
8. Red (3:11) - inspired by Hellboy
9. Widows & Orphans (5:45)

== Personnel ==
Band

- Alan Tecchio - Vocals
- Jack Frost - Guitars
- Kevin Bolembach - Bass
- Jeff Curenton - Drums

With

- Eric Ragno - Keyboards & Piano
- Patrick Johansson - Drums on Track 1
- Dennis Hayes - Bass on Track 2
