= Paranoid (band) =

German EBM group

- Origin: Aachen, NRW, Germany
- Genre: EBM
- Years active: 1987–1999
- Labels: Animalized; Machinery
- Past members: Stephan Tesch; Michael Formberg (died 2023)

Paranoid was a German EBM group, formed in 1987 in Aachen, North Rhine-Westphalia, Germany, by Stephan Tesch and Michael Formberg. They disbanded in 1993. Formberg later formed a solo project, Paralyzzer, in 2018, while Tesch joined Martin Bodewell of Orange Sector to form Pandoria in 2020.

== Discography ==
=== Albums ===
- 1991 Strain (Animalized: LP / CD / Cass)
- 1992 Sweat Blood & Tears (Machinery Records: CD)
- 2011 I Still Dominate You (Infacted Recordings: CD)
- 2016 Never too late (Infacted Recordings: CD, compilation)

=== Singles ===
- 1991 I Dominate You (Animalized: 12")
- 1991 Vicious Circle (Animalized: CD / 12")
- 1992 Desire (Animalized: CD / 12")
- 1992 Love And Hate (Machinery Records: CD / 12")
