= Syntec =

German electronic music band

Syntec is a German electronic music band. They were one of the first bands to fuse synthpop and electronic body music.

The original band members were Tobias Hartwig (vocals and lyrics), Uwe Kallenbach (music, synthesizers, and programming), and Jens Meyer (keyboards). They reformed in 2016 and started recording and playing live again.

== Discography ==
=== Albums ===
- The Total Immersion (Machinery, 1994)
- Upper World (Machinery, 1995)
- The Beginning (Infacted, 2016)

==== Compilations ====
- Eternity: The Best of Syntec (Synthphony, 2000)
- Puppets & Angels (Infacted, 2016)

=== Singles ===
- Puppets (Machinery, 1993)
- It Takes A Word (Machinery, 1993)
- Angel (Machinery, 1995)
- Catch My Fall (Infacted, 2016)
