= Deadly Sins (album) =

Studio album by Seven Witches
- Released: November 20, 2007
- Recorded: 2006–2007
- Genre: Heavy metal
- Length: 40:50
- Label: Locomotive
- Producer: Jack Frost

Seven Witches chronology
Amped (2005)	Deadly Sins (2007)	Call Upon the Wicked (2011)

Professional ratings
Review scores
Source	Rating
AllMusic	3.5/5 stars

Deadly Sins is the seventh album by the American heavy metal band Seven Witches.

== Track listing ==
All tracks by Jack Frost & Alan Tecchio except where noted.

1. "Deadly Sins" – 3:55
2. "Science" – 4:16
3. "Commerce" – 4:18
4. "Worship" – 3:47
5. "Knowledge" – 3:24
6. "Pleasure" – 4:23
7. "Wealth" – 3:19
8. "Man of the Millennium" – 4:48
9. "Politics" – 4:04
10. "The Answer" (Frost, Bobby Lucas) – 4:38

== Personnel ==
- Alan Tecchio – vocals
- Jack Frost – guitars, vocals, engineer
- Joey Vera – bass, producer, editing, mixing, mastering
- Troll – drums
- Kevin Bolembach – bass
- Don Sternecker – engineer
- Carl André Beckston – cover art, booklet design
