= Play My Game =

Studio album by Tim "Ripper" Owens
- Released: May 15, 2009
- Recorded: Early 2009 in Morrisound Studios, United States
- Genre: Heavy metal, hard rock
- Length: 52:59
- Label: Steamhammer
- Producer: Brett Chassen, Bob Kulick

Tim "Ripper" Owens chronology
Play My Game (2009)	Return to Death Row (2022)

Professional ratings
Review scores
Source	Rating
Allmusic	3.5/5 stars
Dangerdog Music Reviews	4.5/5 stars

Play My Game is the debut solo album by vocalist Tim "Ripper" Owens. Many well known musicians perform on the album. Play My Game was released by Steamhammer/SPV on May 15, 2009, in Germany, May 18, 2009, in Europe and May 19, 2009, in the US and Canada.

The album features such guests as Doug Aldrich (Whitesnake), Billy Sheehan (Mr. Big), Bruce Kulick (ex-KISS), Jeff Loomis (Nevermore), Michael Wilton (Queensrÿche), James LoMenzo (Megadeth), Steve Stevens (Billy Idol) and Vinny Appice (ex-Black Sabbath, ex-Dio).

== Track listing ==
No.	Title	Writer(s)	Performed by	Length
1.	"Starting Over"	Tim Owens, Bob Kulick	Performed by: Bob Kulick - guitar; Rudy Sarzo - bass; Simon Wright - drums	3:33
2.	"Believe"	Owens	Performed by: Craig Goldy - lead guitar; John Comprix - rhythm guitar; Rudy Sarzo - bass; Simon Wright - drums	4:35
3.	"The Cover Up"	Owens	Performed by: Jeff Loomis - lead guitar; John Comprix - guitar; James Lomenzo - bass; Brett Chassen - drums	4:30
4.	"Pick Yourself Up"	Owens, Mike Callahan	Performed by: Steve Stevens - lead guitar; Bob Kulick - rhythm guitar; Mike Callahan - rhythm guitar; Dennis Hayes - bass; Ray Luzier - drums	4:32
5.	"It Is Me"	Owens	Performed by: Carlos Cavazo - lead guitar; Mike Callahan - rhythm guitar; Rudy Sarzo - bass; Simon Wright - drums	2:53
6.	"No Good Goodbyes"	Owens, Kulick, Brett Chassen	Performed by: Bruce Kulick - lead guitar; Bob Kulick - rhythm guitar; Billy Sheehan - bass; Brett Chassen - drums	3:35
7.	""The World Is Blind"	Owens	Performed by: Doug Aldrich - lead guitar; John Comprix - rhythm guitar; Billy Sheehan - bass; Simon Wright - drums	4:50
8.	"To Live Again"	Owens	Performed by: Michael Wilton - lead & rhythm guitars; Bob Kulick - rhythm guitar; David Ellefson - bass; Simon Wright - drums	6:00
9.	"The Light"	Owens, Kulick	Performed by: Bob Kulick - rhythm guitar; Tony Franklin - bass; Bobby Jarzombek - drums	4:36
10.	"Play My Game"	Owens, John Comprix	Performed by: Neil Zaza - lead guitar; John Comprix - rhythm guitar; Rudy Sarzo - bass; Simon Wright - drums	4:43
11.	"Death Race"	Owens, Comprix	Performed by: John Comprix - guitar; James Lomenzo - bass; Brett Chassen - drums	3:29
12.	"The Shadows Are Alive"	Owens, Chris Caffery	Performed by: Chris Caffery - guitar; Marco Mendoza - bass; Simon Wright - drums	5:35
13.	"A Challenge" (iTunes bonus track)	Owens, Kulick	Performed by: Bob Kulick - guitar; Rudy Sarzo - bass; Vinny Appice - drums	4:17

== Personnel ==
Tim "Ripper" Owens - lead vocals, additional guitars

=== Guitar ===
- Bob Kulick - tracks 1, 4, 6, 8, 9, 13
- Bruce Kulick - track 6
- Carlos Cavazo - track 5
- Craig Goldy - track 2
- Doug Aldrich - track 7
- Chris Caffery - track 12
- Steve Stevens - track 4
- Jeff Loomis - track 3
- Michael Wilton - track 8
- Neil Zaza - track 10
- John Comprix - tracks 2, 3, 5, 7, 10, 11
- Mike Callahan - track 4

=== Bass ===
- Marco Mendoza - track 12
- Billy Sheehan - tracks 6, 7
- David Ellefson - track 8
- James Lomenzo - track 3, 11
- Rudy Sarzo - tracks 1, 2, 5, 10, 13
- Tony Franklin - track 9
- Dennis Hayes - track 4

=== Drums ===
- Simon Wright - tracks 1, 2, 5, 7, 8, 10, 12
- Vinny Appice - track 13
- Bobby Jarzombek - track 9
- Ray Luzier - track 4
- Brett Chassen - 3, 6, 11

=== Touring Personnel ===
- Tim "Ripper" Owens - lead vocals
- John Comprix - lead guitar
- Chris Caffery - lead guitar
- David Ellefson - bass
- Simon Wright - drums, percussion
