= James Kennedy (musician) =

Welsh musician, author and podcaster

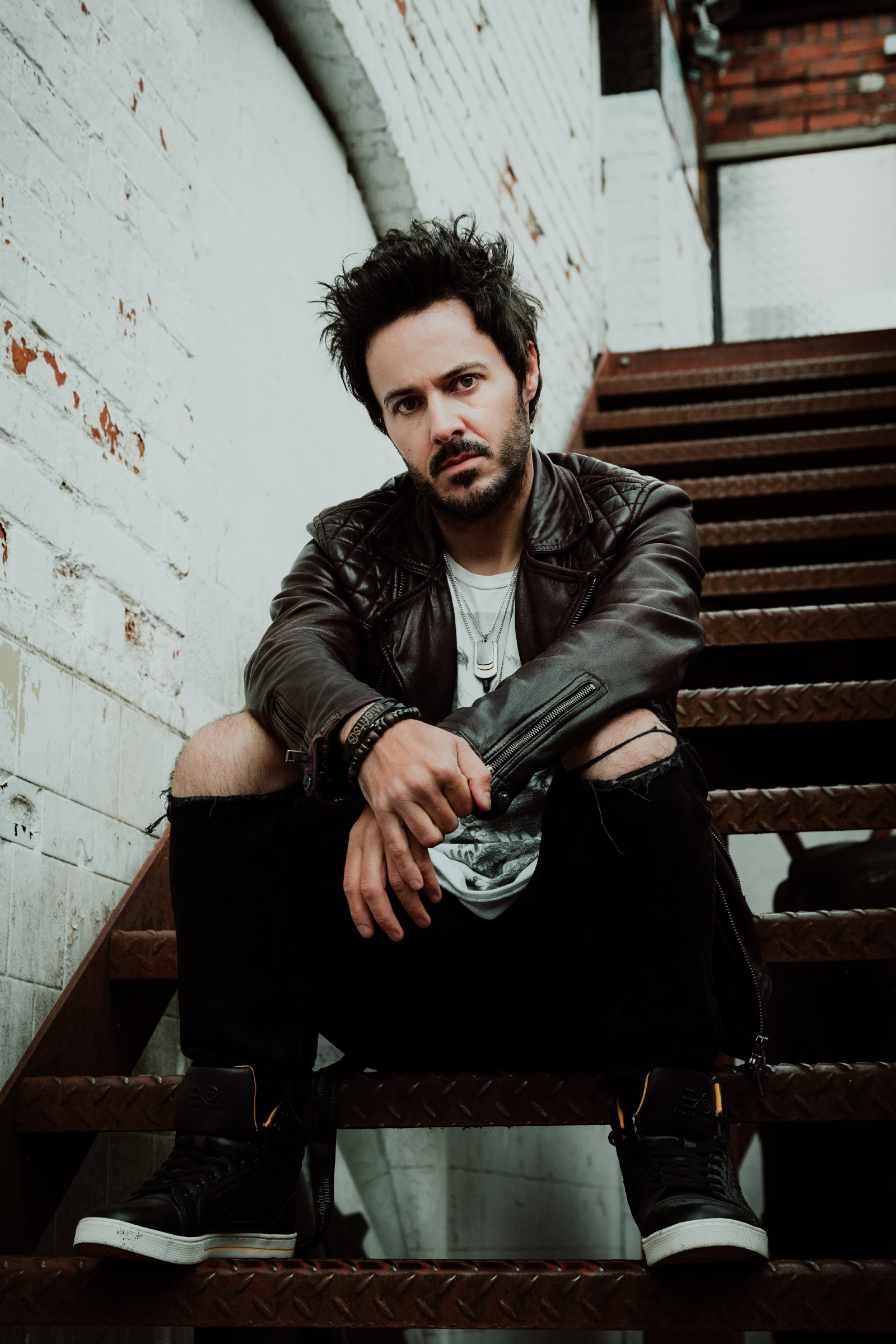

Background information
- Born: 15 March 1980 (age 46); Cardiff, Wales
- Genres: Alternative rock; progressive rock; hard rock; punk rock
- Occupations: Musician; author; songwriter
- Instruments: Vocals; guitar; bass; production
- Years active: 2002–present
- Labels: Konic Records; Combat Records
- Member of: James Kennedy and The Underdogs
- Formerly of: Kyshera
- Website: jameskennedyofficial.com

James Kennedy (born 15 March 1980) is a Welsh rock solo artist, author and podcaster. He was formerly the singer and guitarist in the alternative rock band Kyshera until they disbanded in 2018 and now fronts the band James Kennedy & The Underdogs. He is a multi-instrumentalist and often plays all of the instruments on his recordings. He has released eight albums since 2010, including three with Kyshera and five solo releases with his latest being Make Anger Great Again, released in 2020 by Konic Records. Also in 2020, Kennedy's autobiography Noise Damage was published by Eye Lightning Books which peaked at number one on Amazon. His 2nd book, 'Loud Medicine: Dispatches From the Music Industry Underworld' was published in 2025.

In 2022 Kennedy began hosting The James Kennedy Podcast, a weekly podcast where he interviews musicians, activists, politicians and authors. Previous guests include Steven Donziger, Frank Turner, Sarah Wilson, Bob Roth, Rou Reynolds, Stella Assange, Nadia Whittome and George Monbiot among others.

Kennedy was included in a poll of the Top 50 Sexiest Men in Wales along with Tom Ellis, Kelly Jones and Jamie Roberts.

In March 2026 it was announced that 'James Kennedy and The Underdogs' had signed a deal with Combat Records for the release of their latest album 'Rebel', released on November 30, 2026.

== Personal life ==
At the age of ten Kennedy was diagnosed with advanced bilateral cholesteatoma, a destructive expanding growth in both of his middle ears which required three major ear operations. As a result of the surgery, he lost 40% of his hearing in both ears and developed constant white noise Tinnitus in his left ear.

Kennedy frequently receives online trolling from people mistaking him for James Kennedy from the US reality show Vanderpump Rules. He was one of several artists who gave evidence at a 2022 hearing at the House of Lords about the difficulties for UK artists to tour in Europe post-Brexit. In November 2022, Kennedy alleged that he was physically assaulted by three plain-clothed police officers whilst sitting in his car, resulting in an ongoing investigation which the South Wales Police have said they are taking "extremely seriously".

In 2013 he won a court case against the record label Rising Records over the release of the Kyshera album Made in China.

== Discography ==
With Kyshera

- Paradigm (2010)
- Made in China (2012)
- Circle (2015)

As James Kennedy

- 9.i.P (2012)
- The National Health Service (2013)
- Cover Songs Vol 1 (2016)
- Home (2017)

With James Kennedy and The Underdogs

- Make Anger Great Again (2020)
- Make Acoustic Great Again EP (2023)
- Rebel (2026)

== Bibliography ==
- Noise Damage : My Life as a Rock'n'Roll Underdog (2020)
- Loud Medicine : Dispatches from the Music Industry Underworld (2025)
