= Deathrow (band) =

German thrash metal band

Deathrow was a thrash metal group from Düsseldorf, Germany. Founded in 1984 as Samhain, they notably released three albums on Noise Records.

With the arrival of guitarist Uwe Osterlehner, came a shift toward a more intricate and progressive style that would ultimately be heard on subsequent albums Deception Ignored (1989) and Life Beyond (1992). In 2018, all four albums were remastered and released.

== Discography ==
- Satan's Gift (1986, Combat Records), renamed and re-released as Riders of Doom (Noise Records)
- Raging Steel (1987, Noise Records)
- Deception Ignored (1989, Noise Records)
- Life Beyond (1992, West Virginia Records)

== Members ==
- Milo Van Jaksic – lead vocals, bass (1986-1989, 1990-1994)
- Sven Flügge – lead guitar (1986-1989, 1990-1994)
- Uwe Osterlehner – lead guitar, piano, classical guitar, backing vocals (1988-1989, 1990-1994)
- Markus Hahn – drums (1986-1989, 1990-1994)
- Thomas Priebe – lead guitar (1986-1988; his death)
