= Dennis Hayes (musician) =

American bass guitarist

Dennis Hayes is an American bass guitarist, currently playing for Beyond Fear.

Hayes began his career with the heavy metal band Wretch. Later he was a founding member of the Progressive Heavy Metal band Castle Black with other former members of Wretch, Nick Giannakos (Lead Guitar) and Drummer, Jeff Currenton. It was during this time where he began a long association with Tim "Ripper" Owens, as Castle Black and Winter's Bane often played the same venues around Northeastern Ohio. Hayes eventually was offered, and accepted, membership in Winter's Bane. Both Hayes and Owens performed on Winter's Bane's 1993 debut album Heart of a Killer. Dennis also played in the Heavy metal band Seven Witches from 2004 to 2005, but left to form Beyond Fear together with Owens, a side project to the singer's role in Iced Earth.

After James "Bo" Wallace left Iced Earth in March 2007, Hayes was called in to replace him on the band's upcoming tour. Following Owens' departure from Iced Earth later that year, Hayes also left the band.

== Discography ==
=== With Iced Earth ===
- 2007 – Framing Armageddon (Something Wicked Part 1) (played on 2 songs)
- 2008 – The Crucible of Man: Something Wicked Part 2 (played on 5 songs)

=== With Beyond Fear ===
- 2006 – Beyond Fear

=== With Seven Witches ===
- 2004 – Year of the Witch
- 2005 – Amped (played on "Sunnydale High")
- 2006 – Years of the Witch [DVD]

=== With Winters Bane ===
- 1993 – Heart of a Killer
- 1997 – Girth

=== With Wretch ===
- Reborn

=== With Tim "Ripper" Owens ===
- Play My Game (2009)
