= Jack Frost (musician) =

American guitarist

- Born: John Dempsey; Jersey City, New Jersey, U.S.
- Genres: Heavy metal
- Occupations: Musician, producer, songwriter
- Instrument: Guitar
- Years active: 1994–present
- Member of: Seven Witches, The Bronx Casket Company, Frost

John Dempsey, known professionally as Jack Frost, is an American guitarist. He is one of the founders of the heavy metal band Seven Witches and also a part of The Bronx Casket Company. Frost is also known for playing guitar on Savatage's tour in support of Poets and Madmen in 2001 and 2002 before being dismissed from the band for unspecified reasons. He also toured in Anthrax vocalist Joey Belladonna's backing band, and played in a cover band called Diesel which featured Taz Marazz of Seven Witches, Mike Lepond of Symphony X on bass, and Jim Pepe on lead vocals.

Frost has released two solo albums, Raise Your Fist to Metal in 2003 and Out in the Cold in 2005.

== Discography ==
=== Solo artist ===
- 2003 – Raise Your Fist to Metal
- 2005 – Out in the Cold

=== With Frost Bite ===
- 1994 – Icy Hell
- 1996 – Secret Admirer
- 1997 – Carousel

=== With Seven Witches ===
- 1998 – Seven Witches
- 1999 – Second War in Heaven
- 2000 – City of Lost Souls
- 2002 – Xiled to Infinity and One
- 2003 – Passage to the Other Side
- 2004 – Year of the Witch
- 2005 – Amped
- 2007 – Deadly Sins
- 2011 – Call Upon the Wicked
- 2013 – Rebirth
- 2015 – The Way of the Wicked

=== With The Bronx Casket Company ===
- 1999 – Bronx Casket Company
- 2000 – Sweet Home Transylvania
- 2005 – Hellectric
- 2011 – Antihero

=== With Speed ===
- 1999 – Powertrip Pigs

=== With Metalium ===
- 2000 – State of Triumph: Chapter Two
