= Tear Ceremony =

American electronic and ambient band

Tear Ceremony is an American electronic and ambient band fronted by Todd Gautreau (Gauthreaux)that was active in the late 1990s. Gautreau then changed his moniker to Sonogram as the music became less dark and more optimistic. Gautreau then fronted the indie rock band Crushed Stars. After a SXSW appearance, Crushed Stars signed to Portland's Arena Rock Records. They returned to SXSW and CMJ the following year. Crushed Stars has worked with such producers as Stuart Sikes (Cat Power, White Stripes) and John Congleton (The Walkmen, Modest Mouse) Both Crushed Stars and Sonogram now record for Simulacra Records.

Gautreau returned to ambient music in 2014 with his new project Tapes and Topographies. In addition to several releases on Simulacra, Tapes and Topographies has released music on Past Inside the Present, Dronarivm, Whitelabrecs, Shimmering Moods and ROHS!

== Discography ==
- An Hourglass of Opals (Machinery Records)
- Resin (Simulacra Records)
- Film Decay (Simulacra Records)
- Emulsion (Simulacra Records)
