= Combat Records =

American record label

- Parent company: Sony; Koch; EMP
- Founded: 1982
- Distributor: Important/Relativity/AMPED/SPV
- Genre: Heavy metal
- Country of origin: U.S.
- Location: New York City

Combat Records is an American independent record label founded in 1982 and based in New York City.

The label was made specifically for heavy metal and punk rock acts. Notable artists include: Megadeth, Circle Jerks, Nuclear Assault, OZ, Death, Dead Brain Cells, Possessed, Crumbsuckers, Agnostic Front, Agent Steel, Dark Angel, Heathen, Zoetrope, Ludichrist and Exodus. In 2017, it was announced that Combat was being relaunched by Megadeth bassist David Ellefson and Thom Hazaert as a new label imprint under their EMP Label Group. Ellefson sold the label in 2026 and it is now being run under new management from its new office in Göttingen, Germany.

== History ==
Combat Records was the in-house heavy metal label for the independent powerhouse distributor Important Record Distributors. Important had several United States offices promoting and selling Combat's releases. Important Records was also home to Megaforce Records in the mid-1980s and produced Metallica's Kill 'Em All and Ride the Lightning (prior to Metallica's transfer to Elektra Records), Anthrax's Fistful of Metal and many other early Megaforce releases.

In mid-1986, the label Noise Records signed a deal with Combat to distribute records in the US. Noise represented the bands Voivod, Celtic Frost, Helloween, Tankard, and Running Wild). Neat also signed with Combat, bringing Venom and Raven to the US. In contrast, Metal Blade brought Slayer and Trouble. Usually releases were issued in joint venture with the Combat logo.

The label signed thrash metal band Megadeth to a contract in November 1984. The band released their first album Killing Is My Business... and Business Is Good! in 1985. Capitol Records signed Megadeth in 1985, obtaining the rights from Combat to Peace Sells... but Who's Buying?, Megadeth's second album. The Combat logo appeared on the back of every Megadeth album on Capitol up through 1992's Countdown to Extinction. Killing Is My Business... and Business Is Good! is one of the highest selling albums released by Combat Records with more than 200,000 copies sold.

The label had distribution deals with Music for Nations and Under One Flag for European releases of their catalog.

=== Purchase of the company ===
Combat Records was later taken over by Relativity Records. Owned by Sony Music, Relativity allowed Combat to exist for a brief period, before shutting it down. Later, Sony would discontinue Relativity Records as well. Sony Music Entertainment continues to retain rights to the majority of the label's catalog.

=== Rebirth ===
Combat Records briefly reformed in 2005, as an imprint under Koch Records, releasing records from Look What I Did, Horse the Band, and At All Cost.

Sony Music Entertainment released most of the original Combat catalog digitally for the first time in 2015. The releases were marketed through the relaunched Music For Nations label.

In 2017, it was announced that Megadeth bassist David Ellefson and Thom Hazaert were relaunching Combat as an imprint of EMP Label Group, who have released albums from Soulfly guitarist Marc Rizzo, Wrath, Dead By Wednesday, Hatchet, Sword, and more. On New Year's Day 2018, Ellefson announced that Throw the Goat was the first new band to be signed. In 2019, Ellefson and Hazaert's Combat Records, released joint venture reissues of several classic Combat catalog titles with Century Media Records, including releases by Exodus, Possessed, and Dark Angel. Tech Death Metal End-Time Illusion released Anamnesis Genesis in late 2023 under Combat and Mindsnap Music.

In February 2026, it was announced that Combat had been relaunched again under new ownership after its sale by Ellefson and would now be run by its new owners, Robert Dujmusic, Alex Stojak and Nicole Wendeborn from its new office in Germany. Shortly after, in March 2026 the label announced their first signing under its new management, South Wales hard rock band James Kennedy and The Underdogs.

== Former artists ==
- Abattoir
- The Accüsed
- Agent Steel
- Agnostic Front
- Agony
- At All Cost
- Blind Illusion
- Bolt Thrower
- Carcass
- Charged G.B.H.
- C.I.A.
- Circle Jerks
- The Conduit
- Corrosion of Conformity
- Crumbsuckers
- Cyclone Temple
- D.B.C.
- Dark Angel
- Death
- Deathrow
- Devastation
- End-Time Illusion
- Entombed
- The Exploited
- Exodus
- Faith or Fear
- Forbidden
- Forced Entry
- Godflesh
- Have Mercy
- Heathen
- Helstar
- HORSE the band
- Impaler
- Look What I Did
- Ludichrist
- Megadeth
- Mercyful Fate
- Morbid Angel
- Murder in the First
- Murphy's Law
- Napalm Death
- Nocturnus
- Nuclear Assault
- Oz
- Possessed
- Powermad
- Raven
- Running Wild
- The Rods
- Thrasher
- TKO
- Tokyo Blade
- Savatage
- Steve Vai
- Sweet Pain
- Venom
- Virus
- Zoetrope
- Mercedes Sosa

== Videos ==
Combat formed a video label in 1985. It released one title, Combat Tour Live: The Ultimate Revenge, later that year.
