= Noise Records =

German record label

- Parent company: Modern Music Records GmbH (1983–2001), Sanctuary Records Group (2001–2007), BMG Rights Management (2016–present)
- Founded: 1983
- Founder: Karl-Ulrich Walterbach
- Status: Active
- Distributor(s): Noise International; Century Media Records; Sanctuary Records Group
- Genre: Heavy metal, extreme metal
- Country of origin: Germany
- Location: Berlin
- Official website: noiserecords.net

Noise Records is a German heavy metal record label founded in 1983 by German music industry personality Karl-Ulrich Walterbach as an expansion of his company Modern Music Records. It was sold to the Sanctuary Records Group in 2001 and ceased any activity in 2007 due to the bankruptcy of Sanctuary. The Noise catalogue was consequently acquired by Universal Music Group later on. In April 2016, BMG Rights Management, which had acquired Sanctuary Records in 2013, announced that it would revive the Noise Records label.

== History ==
In 1981, Karl-Ulrich Walterbach founded the independent record company Modern Music Records GmbH in Berlin, Germany. In the first years of activity, the label division called Aggressive Rock Produktionen (AGR) published only punk German-speaking groups (Slime, Daily Terror, Toxoplasma, compilation series like "Soundtracks zum Untergang") and American punk bands (Black Flag with Henry Rollins, Hüsker Dü, Misfits, Angry Samoans, etc.). In 1983, Walterbach was working closely with Black Flag and the American label SST and was also in contact with American West Coast underground metal bands such as Saint Vitus.

From this nucleus he developed the label Noise Records, which was in 1984 the first specialized outlet for European thrash metal bands such as Kreator, Tankard, Sabbat and Coroner, but released also the works of bands with other metal styles, such as Helloween, Running Wild, Celtic Frost, Grave Digger, Voivod, and Rage. In the early days, there was a two-year collaboration with the New York-based label Megaforce Records, which was the first publisher of Metallica. Through this deal, Noise published under license the albums of American thrash metal band Overkill and at the same time Megaforce issued Grave Digger works in the United States.

Noise Records' most successful band was the Hamburg-based power metal band Helloween. The Keeper of the Seven Keys albums achieved worldwide top chart positions and sales of over 1 million alone for Keeper of the Seven Keys: Part II in the late 1980s.

A European label deal in 1990 with the German EMI for four bands (Helloween, Running Wild, Celtic Frost, V2) was short-lived because the management of Helloween decided unilaterally to have the group put under contract directly with the English subsidiary of EMI. The subsequent 16 lawsuits were decided by the German courts in favor of Noise Records and settled out of court after a two-year legal battle. The settlement cost Helloween a seven-digit figure. The other result of the legal battle was that Helloween stopped releasing albums and touring for two years and then went their own way. With a stylistic change towards glam metal in Pink Bubbles Go Ape their sales declined to 25% of their Noise Records heights and resulted in EMI dropping the band after just two studio albums.

Machinery Records (or simply Machinery) was a record label founded by Jor Jenka and Anna Rosen in 1989 and also based in Berlin, Germany. The label was best known for releasing industrial and experimental acts, several of which (such as Oomph! and Cubanate) went on to achieve later success. The label's heyday was the early 1990s when it was considered one of the most important labels for EBM and electro-industrial music. In 1991, Machinery came under the Noise Records banner, as part of the Modern Music Records group. By the end of the 1990s Machinery was releasing less music, with many of the original acts instead releasing on the Dynamica sub-label. When Modern Music was acquired by the Sanctuary Records Group in 2001, the Machinery imprint was finally dropped.

The imprint T&T Records was born in 1993, as a subsidiary of Noise Records and brought to the roster more melodic heavy metal bands (Virgin Steele, Stratovarius, Elegy, etc.), while the cooperation with the Berlin label Hellhound Records in 1994 introduced Noise in the doom metal scene. The productions of Noise Records were sold or licensed through a worldwide distribution in about 42 countries. In the United States and the United Kingdom the label had its own offices. Noise Records was sold together with the whole Modern Music Group to the English Sanctuary Records Group in 2001.

After the acquisition by Universal Music Group in August 2007, Sanctuary Records was closed as an independent label. This at the same time meant the end of Noise Records.

An unofficial biography on Noise Records entitled Damn the Machine – The Story of Noise Records, was released in 2017. The book was authored by American metal journalist David E. Gehlke, who received full cooperation from Walterbach and the Noise Records roster.

== Future ==
As of 2016, the label has been reactivated and BMG has launched a reissue campaign from some of the label's most prominent acts. Compilations from bands such as Kreator, Voivod, Running Wild and Grave Digger.

== Noise Records recording artists ==
- Abattoir
- ADX
- Agressor
- Asgard
- Ballantinez
- Bathory
- Beyond Surface
- Bitch
- Burning Heads
- Joacim Cans
- Celtic Frost
- C.I.A.
- Conception
- Coroner
- Count Raven
- Crown
- Crusher
- D.A.M.
- Deathrow
- Debase
- Disaster Area
- DragonForce
- Dyecrest
- Exciter
- Faithful Breath
- Jack Frost
- Gamma Ray
- The Gathering
- Grave Digger
- Gunjah
- Hellhammer
- Helloween
- Helstar
- Helter Skelter
- Hundred Years
- Iron Savior
- Juggernaut
- Kamelot
- Kreator
- Lake of Tears
- Lanadrid
- London
- Manhole
- Mania
- Mercury Rising
- Mezarkabul (Pentagram)
- Messiah
- Midas Touch
- Mindset
- Mind Heavy Mustard
- M.O.D.
- Mordred
- Morgana Lefay
- Naked Sun
- Overkill
- Pain
- Persuader
- Pissing Razors
- Poverty's No Crime
- Rage
- Rated-X
- Rosy Vista
- Running Wild
- Sabbat
- S.A.D.O.
- Saint Vitus
- Scanner
- Secrecy
- Seven Witches
- Dave Sharman
- Shihad
- Silent Force
- Sinner
- Skyclad
- Stigmata IV
- SupaRed
- Superior
- Symphorce
- Tankard
- Tura Satana
- Turbo
- Tyran Pace
- Vendetta
- Vicious Circle
- Voivod
- V2
- Warhead
- Warrant
- W.A.S.P.
- Watchtower

== T&T Records recording artists ==
- Afterworld
- Dokken
- Elegy
- Empyria
- Europe
- Headstone
- Heavenly
- Iron Fire
- Lost Century
- Mennen
- Phantom
- Ricochet
- Stratovarius
- Superior
- Tesla
- Tragedy Divine
- Treasure Land
- Virgin Steele

== Machinery Records recording artists ==
- And One
- Black Lung
- Collapsed System
- Cubanate
- Dance or Die
- D.N.S.
- Kriegbereit
- New Mind
- The Northern Territories
- Oomph!
- Paranoid
- Snog
- Static Icon
- Swamp Terrorists
- Syntec
- Tear Ceremony
- This Digital Ocean
- Trauma
