= Crumbsuckers =

American crossover thrash band

Background information
- Origin: Baldwin, Nassau County, New York, U.S.
- Genres: Thrash metal; crossover thrash; New York hardcore
- Years active: 1982–1990, 2015
- Labels: Relativity, Combat, FOAD
- Past members: Gary Meskil; Dan Richardson; Chuck Lenihan; Chris Notaro; Dave Brady; Kevin Carroll; Dave Wynn; Robbie Koebler; Marc Piovanetti; Joe Haggerty

Crumbsuckers were an American crossover thrash band formed by bass player Gary Meskil in 1982 in Baldwin, Nassau County, New York.

Crumbsuckers combined thrash and hardcore punk sounds and themes, making an impact on the scene with their 1986 debut album, Life of Dreams.

Though the band was supported by its fanbase and fellow artists, Crumbsuckers' second album, Beast on My Back, failed to deliver on expectations. The departure of lead vocalist Chris Notaro in 1988 started the band's gradual decline, despite the Crumbsuckers' attempts to create a new identity. Even so, the band had already cemented themselves as pioneers of the crossover thrash movement.

Crumbsuckers played its latest reunion show (with Chris Notaro on vocals) at the 2015 Black N' Blue Bowl Festival at Webster Hall (formerly the Ritz) in New York City on May 17, 2015.

== History ==
In June 1983, the band recorded a five-song demo at Nino Studio in Baldwin. The demo, unofficially called The Crumbsucker Cave (the name given to the place where Crumbsuckers used to rehearse), included a cover of Chubby Checker's "The Twist". It was with this demo that the band landed their first CBGBs showcase, and subsequent "hardcore" matinées.

At that time, the lineup consisted of Dave Brady (vocals), Dave Wynn (guitar), Gary Meskil (bass) and Kevin 'Toast' Carroll (drums). From the time of their first matinée performance, they prided themselves on playing all original music, with the occasional homage to such tracks as Black Sabbath's "Sweet Leaf" and the theme from Inspector Gadget.

Early in 1985, looking for a sharper edge, they added a second guitarist, fellow Baldwin resident Chuck Lenihan, and replaced Carroll with a local 16-year-old drummer, Dan Richardson. Lenihan's metal-influenced guitar solos contrasted with Wynn's blues-based offerings. Both Crumbsuckers' lyrics and musical direction took a notable turn towards a more metal edge, with songs such as "Life of Dreams" and "Return to the Womb" written around this time.

Following Brady's departure, they needed to recruit a new singer and soon found one from another local hardcore band, Krakdown: Chris Notaro. With the "classic" lineup now complete, they set about recording and releasing their first album.

=== Life of Dreams (1986) ===
The album cover for Life of Dreams

The band recorded their debut album Life of Dreams at Systems Two Studios in Brooklyn, New York City, in 1985, which was released through Combat Records the following year. Produced by Norman Dunn, the album contained 16 tracks clocking in at less than 33 minutes. Life of Dreams delivered a collection of 158 punk/metal-style riffs, with metal-style and blues-style guitar solos, frequent time changes and Chris Notaro's gravel-style vocals. Life of Dreams met with very mixed reviews in the music press.

The album's cover artwork was designed and painted by Sean Taggart, a local New York artist who had provided gig flyers for NYHC bands, as well as providing album covers such as Agnostic Front's Cause for Alarm, Carnivore's Carnivore and Retaliation, Prong's Primitive Origins and Whiplash's Power and Pain.

Crumbsuckers recorded videos for three tracks from Life of Dreams "live" at CBGBs in 1986, with only one track, "Trapped," being commercially released. (The other two tracks, "Bullshit Society" and "Return to the Womb," disappeared for many years but have since surfaced on YouTube.) "Trapped" originally featured as the opening song on an underground video compilation of English and North American punk bands called Hardcore, released by Jettisoundz in 1986. The track is now widely available to view on YouTube.

=== Beast on My Back (1988) ===
In the spring of 1987, guitarist Dave Wynn left the band and, after a few guitarists came and went, Robbie Koebler stepped in to help record their sophomore album Beast on My Back (the acronym B.O.M.B. being assigned to this release).

The album opens with a gloomy piano passage, played by Lenihan's cousin, Mike Francis. The piece had originally been written on guitar (and performed later as such in the live arena), but offered a surprise to those listeners who had become familiar with Life of Dreams, and differed from other metal/crossover albums of the era. The guitar-driven instrumental track "Initial Shock" was penned by Matt Cardin, a fellow Baldwin native and guitarist, although no credit was actually given on the record sleeve. (Cardin had also contributed ideas to a few tracks that found their way on Life of Dreams.)

The band was nominated as the "Best Hardcore Rock Band" in the 1988 New York Music Awards.

By now, Crumbsuckers were partnering with some of their musical peers, including high-profile bands such as Anthrax, Megadeth and Metallica. The shoulder-rubbing also extended to lesser commercially successful artists, such as Agnostic Front, Bad Brains, Cro-Mags and Carnivore. It was during this period that Marc Piovanetti (from Carnivore) joined Crumbsuckers as a full-time guitarist, following the long-standing vacancy left open since the departure of Dave Wynn (and the subsequent entourage of stand-ins).

Following a successful U.S. tour to promote Beast on My Back in 1988, playing with such bands as Sacred Reich and Pantera, Notaro decided this was not for him, citing "musical differences." At that point, the band was already contracted to fulfill a winter tour in Europe (with Onslaught as headliners) in late 1988, but Notaro's replacement for those shows, Joe Haggerty, failed to deliver the vocal performances which had become a trademark of their overall sound.

=== Heavy Rain ===
Within a few weeks of returning home from their European Tour, Haggerty was fired and replaced with a local singer, Craig Allen. New material was written and tightly rehearsed, with a new sound emerging, leading to the band dropping the name Crumbsuckers in favor of a new identity as Heavy Rain.

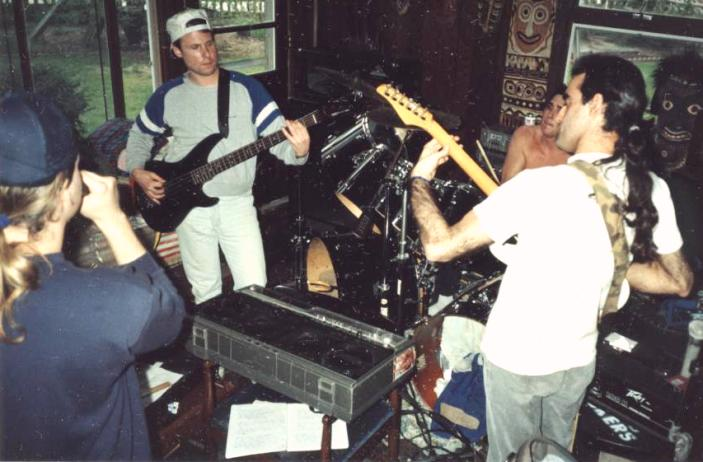
Heavy Rain rehearsing in May 1989

Heavy Rain offered a more radio-friendly rock sound, with vocals more akin to Queensrÿche's Geoff Tate. Whilst they retained small doses of Crumbsuckers' vigorous guitar solos, most songs were recorded and presented in a much more straight, hard rock feel. These new songs failed to attract any interest or support from record companies who had been approached. Much time and effort was spent recording a considerable number of professional studio demos between 1989 and 1990, although nothing was ever officially released.

Heavy Rain disbanded in late 1990. A combination of contractual arguments and disagreements as to which direction the band should take, coupled with the poor response from potential record company interest led to the project's collapse.

=== Pro-Pain ===
From the ashes of Heavy Rain (and Crumbsuckers), Lenihan began jamming with former (Stormtroopers of Death and M.O.D.) vocalist Billy Milano, under a new project called Rawhead. Meskil and Richardson came on board but, over a period of months, a revolving door of guitarists ensued. Lenihan was dismissed and replaced by another Baldwin guitarist, Al Zaleski. He was later replaced by a third Baldwin fret-wizard, Tom Klimchuck, who would eventually take a sabbatical from the band.

In the late summer of 1991, Meskil came up with a new name for the band, Pro-Pain, and the band gathered at Pyramid Sound Studios, Ithaca, New York to record their debut album, Foul Taste of Freedom. However, further lineup changes took place here, with Milano being sent home (as Meskil decided to take over the vocal duties himself), whilst Lenihan was briefly drafted back in to play lead guitar, only to be ejected for a second time shortly afterwards. A new guitarist, Mike Mays, eventually ended up playing lead guitar on the album tracks. With Klimchuck all the while considered the official Pro-Pain guitarist but still unavailable to tour at that time, the baton was then passed to another new guitarist, Nick St Denis, who helped bring a measure of stability to the line up for the next few years.

Pro-Pain released three albums between 1992 and 1996, touring extensively in Europe and the U.S., but the departure of founding drummer Dan Richardson in 1996 left Meskil as the only original "Crumbsucker" in the band. From there, Pro-Pain added a second guitarist.

In 2006, longtime Pro-Pain guitarist, Tom Klimchuck, played on-stage with Crumbsuckers at their Reunion Show at BB Kings, playing in tandem with original lead guitarist, Chuck Lenihan. In 2015, current Pro-Pain guitarist, Adam Philips, joined Crumbsuckers on stage in the same capacity as Klimchuck did in 2006.

=== Reunions ===
In the summer of 1990, Meskil (inspired by a visit from a devoted English fan, Alex Meissner), put together a Crumbsuckers reunion show with Chris Notaro, being that Meissner had felt somewhat "cheated" seeing Crumbsuckers in the UK in 1988 without Notaro.

Crumbsuckers' first reunion show was held at the Sundance Club in Bayshore, Long Island, on August 24, 1990, with Chris Notaro returning to vocal duties for the first time since his departure in 1988 and featured the same lineup from the tour of that year; Lenihan, Meskil, Notaro, Piovanetti and Richardson. The venue was sold out.

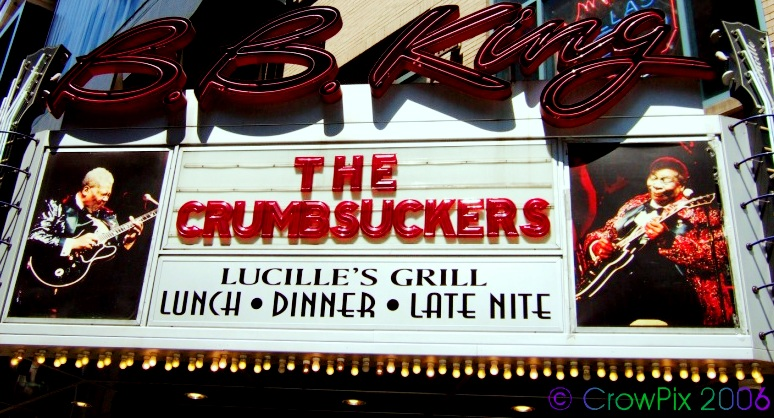
Crumbsuckers, New York City, August 2006

Sixteen years passed until Crumbsuckers reunited once again on August 3, 2006, at B.B.Kings in New York City, to commemorate 20 years since the release of their debut album Life of Dreams.

Once again, Alex Meissner helped initiate the reunion, having rebuilt broken bridges between some of the original band members. The sold-out venue witnessed an appearance by original members Dave Wynn and Dave Brady on the classic track "Hub Run." Around 2000, fans gathered that evening to celebrate the anniversary, including a significant number of old friends of Crumbsuckers from the early days (many of whom had driven or flown considerable distances to attend the show). Everyone considered the evening to be the equivalent to a "big old class reunion," with Dream Theater drummer Mike Portnoy making particular reference to the evening on his personal website.

On December 24, 2014, it was announced that the band would reunite once more, to play the Black N' Blue Bowl (in New York) in May 2015. The lineup of Chris Notaro (vocals), Gary Meskil (bass), Chuck Lenihan (guitar), Adam Phillips (guitar), and Dan Richardson (drums) successfully took to the stage on May 17, 2015.

== Musical style ==
Crumbsuckers' combined styles earned them respect among the CBGBs matinee crowd. In 1985, they recorded a second demo at CBGBs, with a new five-piece line up, featuring budding drummer Dan Richardson and began searching for a record deal. It was during this time that long-time vocalist Dave Brady left the band.

Notaro, known for his vocals and stage activities, was a founding member of the Long Island band Krakdown, contemporaries of the already established Crumbsuckers.

Crumbsuckers' musical style has been assigned many genres, including Hardcore, Speedcore, Thrash (which extends to Thrash/Punk and Thrash/Metal), Crossover and Speed Metal.

== Other information ==
The band's name was allegedly conceived following an incident in the canteen at Baldwin High School, where Gary Meskil observed a fellow student sucking the crumbs off his plate; "'Hey, look at the crumbsuckers!'" Meskil supposedly exclaimed and, from there, the name Crumbsuckers was born.

Crumbsuckers were one of the first bands to mix the two genres of hardcore punk ethos and heavy metal pathos, as evidenced on their debut album Life of Dreams. The songs were written by Gary Meskil, Dave Wynn, Chuck Lenihan and Dave Brady over the course of their formative years, 1983–1985.

Crumbsuckers' shortest ever officially recorded song was "Shot Down", clocking in at 55 seconds, but they had an even shorter song called "Kids At My School" which lasted only 47 seconds. This latter track finally made it to vinyl some 30 years later, on Turn Back Time: The Early Years 1983–1985.

Only two songs on Life of Dreams featured lyrics written by new vocalist Chris Notaro ("The Longest War" and "Mr Hyde").

The song "Charge" was originally composed as an instrumental song "Charge of the Light Brigade" and was erstwhile earmarked for inclusion on Life of Dreams. However, it was later extended, with lyrics added, and eventually found its home on Beast on My Back.

Although an all-American band, Crumbsuckers' heritage is mostly derived from European lineages: Germany (Meskil), Great Britain (Richardson), Ireland (Brady & Lenihan) and Italy (Notaro & Piovanetti).

While Crumbsuckers were becoming popular in 1988, they remained great friends with another Long Island band who had yet to fully blossom. That band was called Majesty. Waving a strong demo tape before the bosses at Mechanic Records, Chuck Lenihan campaigned hard to get them to offer Majesty a record deal, which they eventually agreed to in 1988, giving Majesty their first big break. Shortly afterwards, having recorded and released their debut album, Majesty changed their name to Dream Theater.

In the late 1980s Lenihan spent many of his Saturday mornings teaching guitar to local aspiring guitarists. With the money he made he himself took guitar lessons from Al Pitrelli.

Between band rehearsals, drummer Dan Richardson pushed himself by donning a set of headphones and jamming along to albums such as Rush's Power Windows to hone his drumming skills. Furthermore, he often utilized an electronic metronome during band rehearsals to get the band to play with pin-point accuracy.

After leaving Pro-Pain, then joining Life of Agony at the height of their success, Dan Richardson later turned down an opportunity to join Nine Inch Nails before going on to play drums with Stereomud on their first two albums.

Gary Meskil paid a fitting tribute (and respectful nod) to his former band by recording a new version of "Just Sit There" on the 2003 Pro-Pain album, Run for Cover.

Lenihan's trademark white Aria Pro II Flying-V guitar, featured in many photographs from their live shows during the 1980s, was accidentally left behind at a venue in Paris, France while Chuck was touring with Genitorturers in 2002. Since that loss he has adopted a Gibson SG for his live shows.

Crumbsuckers' musical family tree has extended in many different directions, including: Darkhaus, Pro-Pain – (Meskil), Life of Agony, Pro-Pain, Stereomud, Medication – (Richardson), Christian Death, Electric Hellfire Club, Genitorturers, Glitter Guns, Vasaria – (Lenihan) and Carnivore [reunion shows], Lava Baby – (Piovanetti).

== Discography ==
- Life of Dreams, Combat Records/(Rough Justice in Europe) 1986

No.	Title	Length
1.	"Just Sit There"	1:05
2.	"Trapped"	2:20
3.	"Interlude"	2:56
4.	"Super Tuesday"	1:02
5.	"Shit's Creek"	2:13
6.	"Return to the Womb"	1:36
7.	"Longest War"	1:56
8.	"Shot Down"	0:55
9.	"Prelude Intro"	2:42
10.	"Life of Dreams"	2:19
11.	"Brainwashed"	3:13
12.	"Faces of Death"	1:30
13.	"Hubrun"	2:24
14.	"Bullshit Society"	2:05
15.	"Live to Work"	1:28
16.	"Moment of Silence/Mr Hyde"	3:55
Total length:		33:39

- Beast on My Back, Combat Records 1988

No.	Title	Length
1.	"Breakout"	5:06
2.	"Jimmie's Dream"	3:12
3.	"Charge"	3:12
4.	"Initial Shock"	4:57
5.	"I Am He"	3:26
6.	"The Connection"	3:05
7.	"Rejuvenate"	3:49
8.	"Remembering Tomorrow"	5:00
9.	"Beast on My Back"	3:04
Total length:		34:51

- Turn Back Time: The Early Years 1983–1985, FOAD Records 2014

No.	Title	Length
1.	"A-OK"	1:19
2.	"The Twist"	1:53
3.	"Emil Mauer (You Dick!)"	1:13
4.	"Kids in My School"	0:47
5.	"Don't Like It"	2:05
6.	"(Just) Sit There"	1:08
7.	"Shit's Creek"	2:19
8.	"Shot Down"	0:54
9.	"Interlude"	3:13
10.	"Trapped"	2:31
11.	"Brainwashed"	2:56
12.	"Live to Work"	1:32
13.	"Charge of the Light Brigade"	3:01
Total length:		24:51

== Line-up ==
=== Last line-up ===
- Gary Meskill – bass (1982–1989)
- Chuck Lenihan – guitar (1985–1989)
- Danny Richardson – drums (1985–1989)
- Mark Piovanelli – guitar (1988–1989)

=== Past members ===
- Dave Brady – vocals (1982–1985)
- Kevin "Toast" Carroll – drums (1982–1985)
- Dave Wynn – guitar (1982–1987)
- Chris Notaro – vocals (1985–1988)
- Robbie Koebler – guitar (1987–1988)
- Joe Haggerty – vocals (1988)
