= Helstar =

American heavy metal band

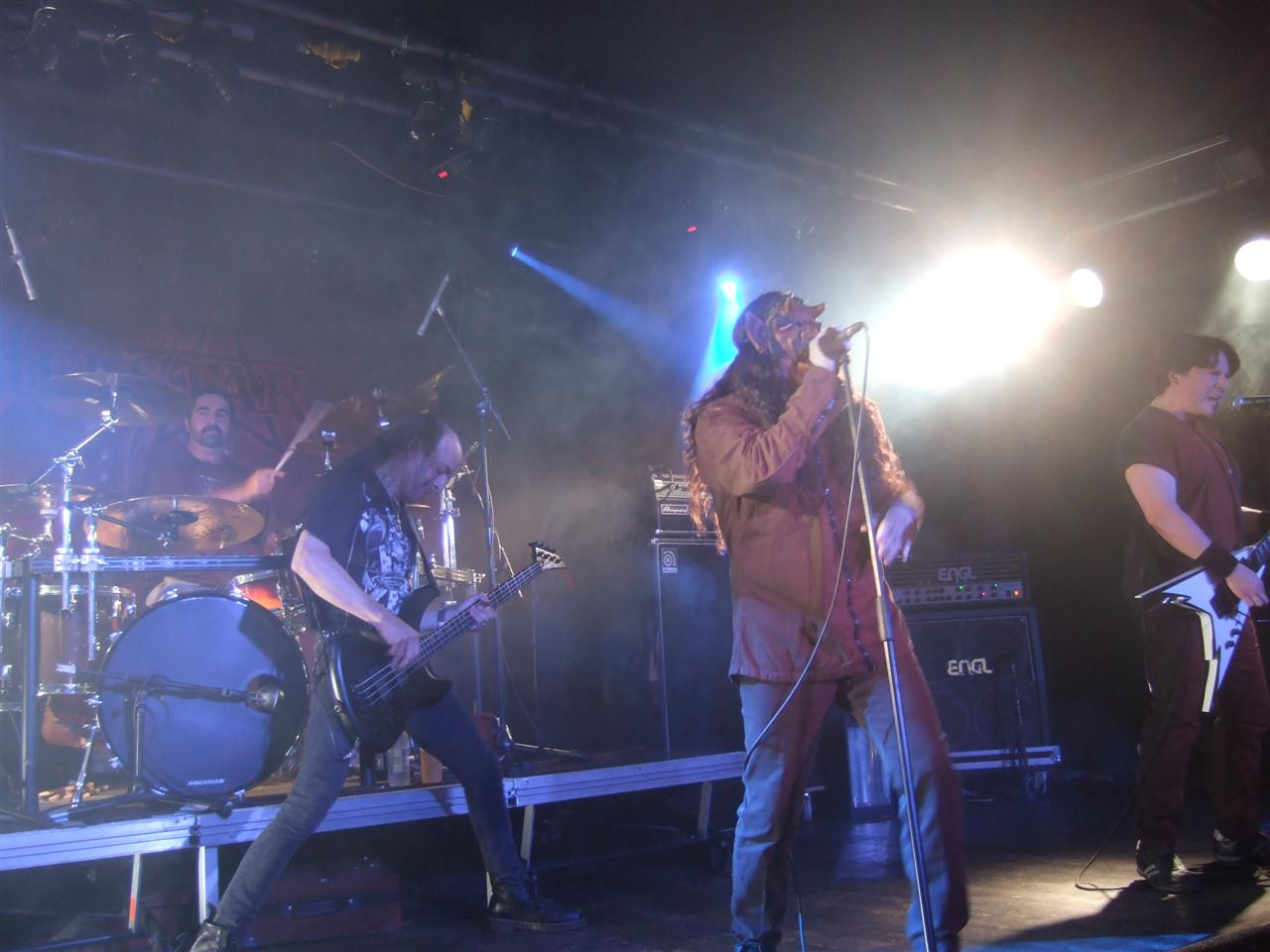
- Helstar performing in 2009

Background information
- Origin: Houston, Texas, U.S.
- Genres: Heavy metal, power metal
- Years active: 1982–1995, 2006–present
- Labels: Combat, Metal Blade, Massacre, AFM, EMP
- Members: James Rivera; Larry Barragan; Michael Lewis; Garrick Smith; Alan DeLeon Jr.
- Website: helstar.com

Helstar is an American heavy metal band formed in Houston, Texas, in 1982 by guitarist Larry Barragan. They influenced American power metal in the mid-1980s.

== History ==
=== Early days and Combat era (1982–1986) ===
Helstar released two demos in 1983, followed by their first studio album in 1984, Burning Star, for Combat Records, making them label mates with Megadeth and Exodus. Inner struggles and management issues led to changes in the line-up. After a year, they released the Remnants of War album on Combat, produced by Randy Burn. The band played their first arena show in December 1985, opening for Stryper at the Sam Houston Coliseum.

=== Metal Blade era (1987–1989) ===
In 1987, they briefly moved to Los Angeles with another line-up change, with guitarist Rob Trevino departing, and it is believed that the song "Abandon Ship", from the 1988 album A Distant Thunder, was dedicated to his departure. Along with guitarist André Corbin, Frank Ferreira was an addition to drums. They returned to Houston in 1988, signed with Metal Blade Records and recorded the A Distant Thunder album produced by Bill Metoyer. The band subsequently toured as openers for acts such as Yngwie Malmsteen, Anthrax, Megadeth, Slayer, Exodus, and Armored Saint.

In 1989, the band released Nosferatu, which many fans consider their greatest album. It was based on the early Dracula film and contained spoken sound bites from the 1979 adaptation. Shortly after a tour of the album, the band recorded a four-song demo which did not gain interest from labels. André Corbin, Frank Ferreria, and Larry Barragan left the band in 1990 to pursue other interests, essentially ending the group for the time being.

=== Demos, Multiples of Black, and hiatuses (1990–2000) ===
Between 1990 and 1993, Helstar released a few demos that failed to receive great recognition. In 1995, Helstar released a new David Ellefson-produced studio album, entitled Multiples of Black. The band would effectively go on hiatus shortly afterwards.

The members of Helstar, namely James Rivera, cooperated in other bands between 1993 and 2002: Seven Witches for a short time in 1993, Distant Thunder in 1995, Chaotic Order in 1997, and Destiny's End. The latter was a group put together by former members of New Eden and joined by Rivera that released two studio albums, Breathe Deep the Dark in 1998 and Transition in 2002.

=== Reunions (2001–present) ===
Helstar went through several reunions starting in 2001. These reunions were primarily organized by James Rivera and longtime bassist Jerry Abarca.

Several live albums came out of this period, but the band was unable to produce any new material. In 2006, for the first time in over 15 years, James Rivera and Larry Barragan reunited and Helstar were officially declared musically active again. Along with Abarca, Rivera and Barragan, also reunited with the Remnants of War guitarist Rob Trevino, and Multiples of Black drummer Russell DeLeon. This lineup released Sins of the Past, "a greatest hits collection" of re-recorded songs in 2007. A year later, they also released an album of original material in 2008 titled The King of Hell.

In 2013, Helstar announced that bassist Jerry Abarca would take an extended break from the band due to a stomach related illness. Mike Lepond and Garrick Smith took on live bass duties for upcoming shows. Helstar released their ninth studio album This Wicked Nest on April 25, 2014. Andrew Atwood joined as second guitarist in 2016 and contributed to that year's album, Vampiro. A compilation album, Clad In Black, was released in February 2021. The band's tenth studio album, and first in 9 years, The Devil's Masquerade was released on September 12, 2025.

== Members ==
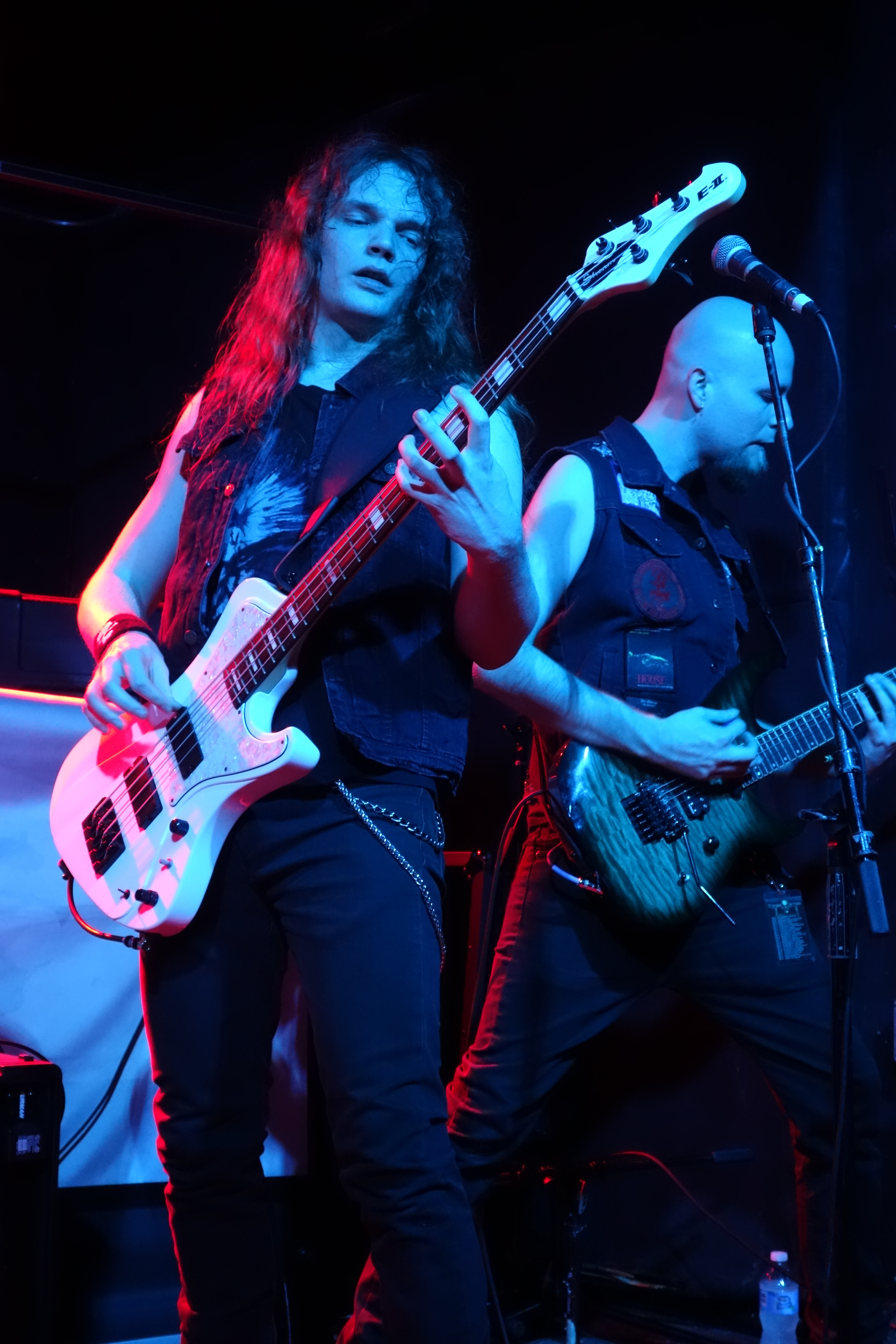
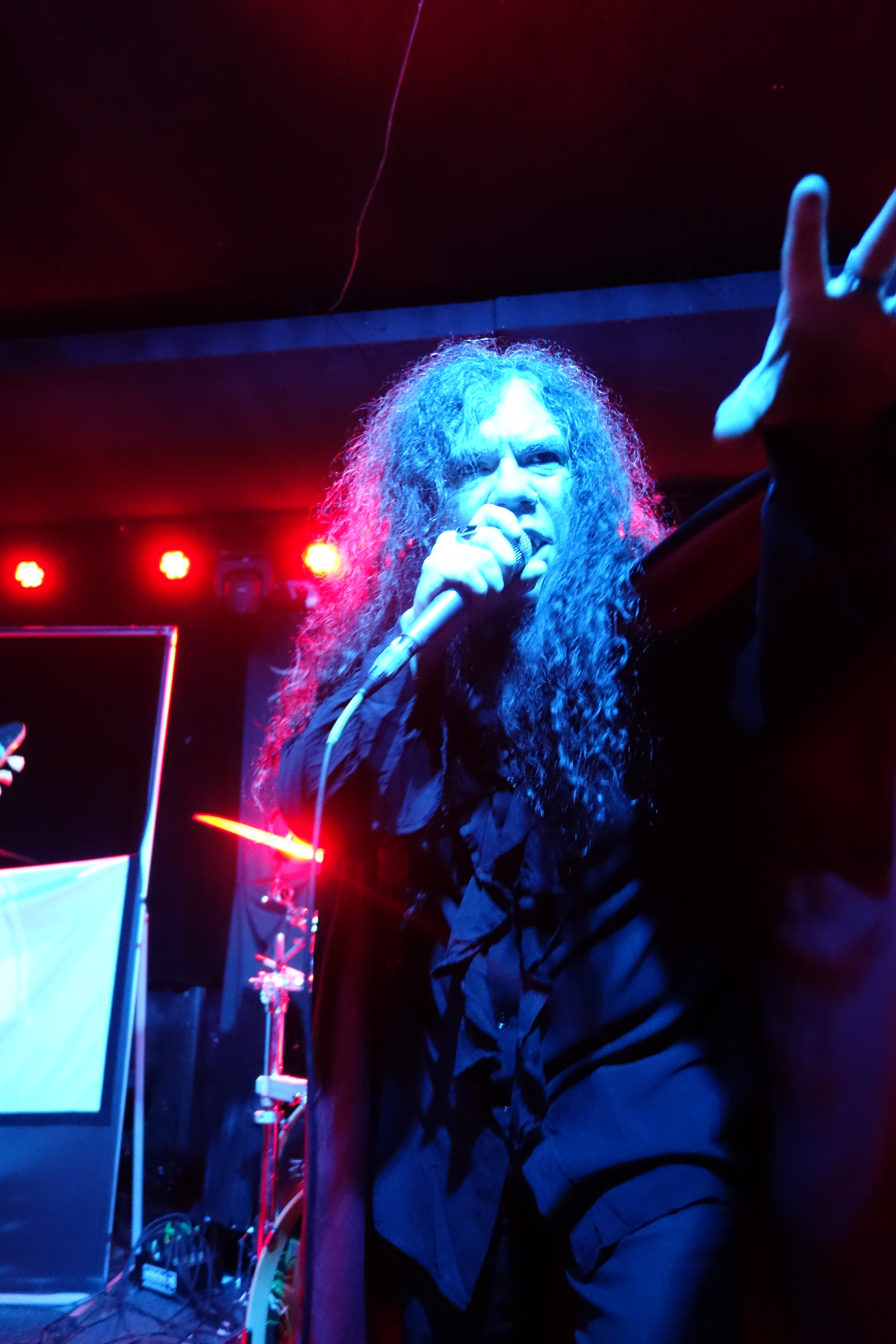
Helstar at the Saint Vitus Bar in Brooklyn, 2016

=== Current ===
- James Rivera – vocals (1982–1995, 2006–present)
- Larry Barragan – guitars (1982–1993, 2006–present)
- Michael Lewis – drums (2010–present)
- Garrick Smith – bass (2013–present)
- Alan DeLeon Jr. – guitars (2024–present)

=== Former ===
Guitars

- Tom Rogers (1982–1985)
- Rob Trevino (1985–1987, 2006–2016)
- André Corbin (1987–1990)
- Aaron Garza (1990–1995)
- Mike Heald (1993–1995)
- Andrew Atwood (2016–2024)

Bass

- Paul Medina (1982–1984)
- Jerry Abarca (1984–1995, 2006–2013, 2025 touring)

Drums

- Hector Pavon (1982–1985)
- René Luna (1985–1987)
- Frank Ferreira (1987–1990)
- Russel DeLeon (1990–1995, 2006–2010)

== Studio albums ==
- Burning Star (Combat Records 1984)
- Remnants of War (Combat Records 1986)
- A Distant Thunder (Metal Blade Records 1988)
- Nosferatu (Metal Blade Records 1989)
- Multiples of Black (Massacre 1995)
- The King of Hell (AFM Records 2008)
- Glory of Chaos (AFM Records 2010)
- This Wicked Nest (AFM Records 2014)
- Vampiro (EMP Label Group, 2016)
- The Devil's Masquerade (Massacre Records, 2025)
