= Seven Witches =

American heavy metal band

- Origin: New Jersey, United States
- Genres: Power metal, heavy metal
- Years active: 1998–present
- Labels: Massacre, Noise, Regain, Locomotive
- Members: Jack Frost; James Rivera; Jeff Curenton; Dennis Hayes

Seven Witches is an American heavy metal band from New Jersey, founded in 1998 by Jack Frost and Bobby Lucas.

== History ==
Seven Witches released a demo-CD in 1998, which resulted in them signing a record deal with Massacre Records. The first two CDs for Massacre, Second War in Heaven and City of Lost Souls, featured vocalist Bobby Lucas. Lucas was the one who named the band and wrote the lyrics with Frost. Lucas left the band in 2000 and was replaced with former Crimson Glory singer Wade Black. With Black on vocals, the band recorded their third studio album Xiled to Infinity and One.

Black left the band in 2002 and was replaced with James Rivera (Helstar). Bass guitar player Billy Mez also left the band in 2002, continuing on with Single Bullet Theory, and was replaced by Joey Vera who has played in Anthrax and Armored Saint. Rivera recorded two albums with the band, Passage to the Other Side and Year of the Witch. He left the band in 2005 to continue with his main project, Helstar. In June 2005, singer Alan Tecchio (best known for his work with the band Watchtower) joined the band and they recorded their sixth studio album, Amped. Tecchio joined the band after singing on "Hell or High Water", a song for Jack Frost solo project. Frost, satisfied with Tecchio's vocals, asked him to join the band. Shortly after that, Kevin Bolembach also joined as Seven Witches' new bass player. Bolembach and Tecchio had played together in Non-Fiction from 1991 to 1996.

Seven Witches released Deadly Sins in 2007. Former bass player Vera mixed the album. Subsequently, they reunited with vocalist Rivera for a tour and a new album titled Call Upon The Wicked which was released on June 28, 2011.

== Members ==
=== Current members ===
- Jack Frost – guitars (1998–present)
- James Rivera – vocals (2002–2005; 2008–2011; 2019–present)
- Jeff Curenton – drums (2004–2006; 2019–present)
- Dennis Hayes – bass (2004–2005; 2019–present)

=== Former members ===
- Bobby Lucas – vocals (1998–2000)
- Wade Black – vocals (2000–2002)
- Alan Tecchio – vocals (2005–2008; 2011–2012)
- Billy Mez – bass (1998–2002)
- Joey Vera – bass (2002–2004)
- Kevin Bolembach – bass (2005–2008)
- Mike LePond – bass (2008–2011)
- Brian Vincent – drums (1998–2000)
- John Osborn – drums (2000–2001)
- Brian Craig – drums (2001–2004)
- Steve Delaney – drums (2006–2007)
- Taz Marazz – drums (2011–2012)
- Anthony Cross A.K.A Anthony Regalbuto – vocals (2012–2019)
- Ronnie Parkes – bass (2012–2019)
- Johnny Kelly – drums (2012–2019)

== Discography ==
=== Studio albums ===
- Second War in Heaven (1999), Massacre
- City of Lost Souls (2000), Massacre
- Xiled to Infinity and One (2002), Noise
- Passage to the Other Side (2003), Noise/Sanctuary
- Year of the Witch (2004), Noise
- Amped (2005), Regain
- Deadly Sins (2007), Locomotive
- Call Upon the Wicked (2011), Massacre
- Rebirth (2013), FrostMetal
- The Way of the Wicked (2015), Ils

=== Live albums ===
- Years of the Witch (2006), Locomotive
