= James Rivera =

American heavy metal singer

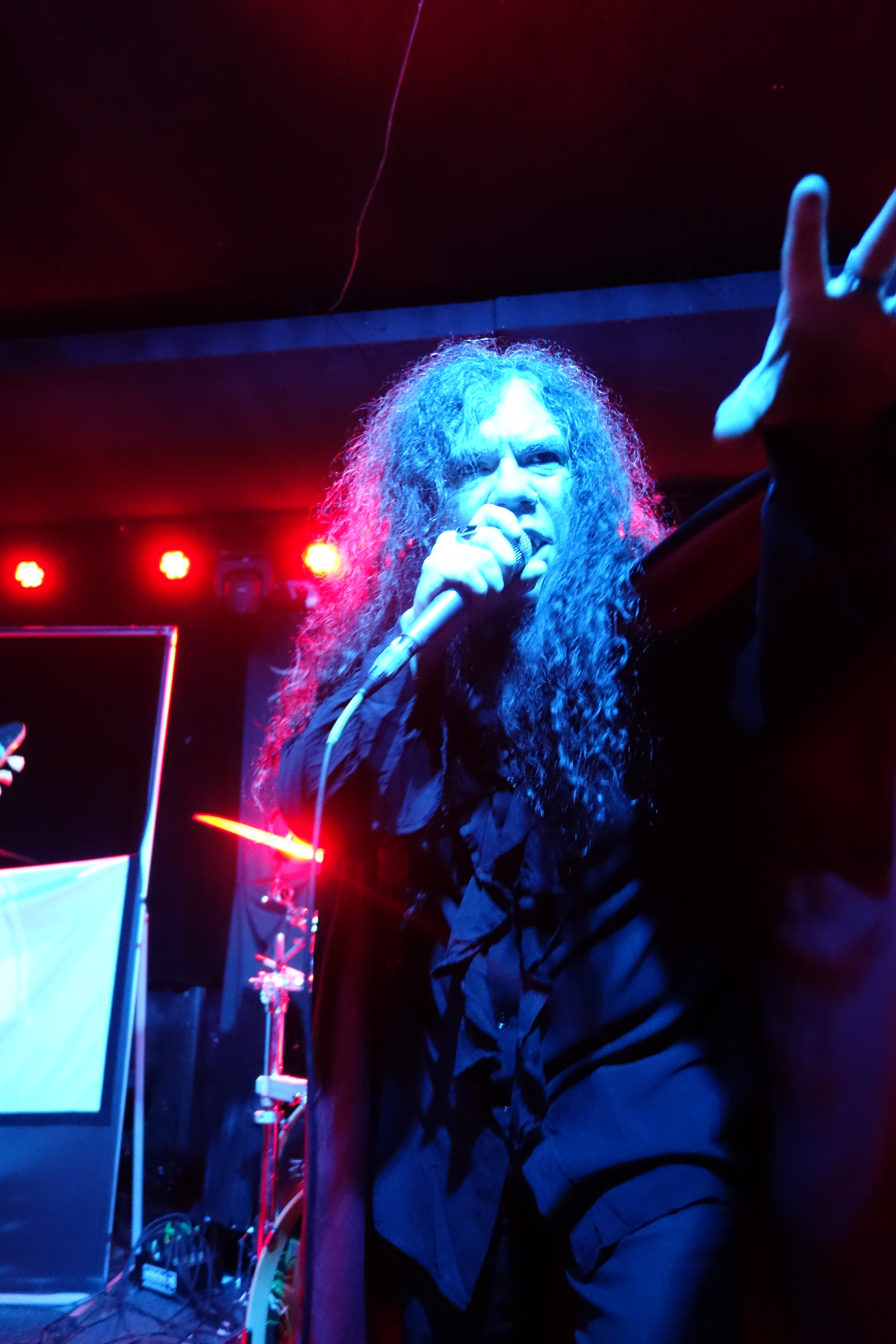
- Rivera in 2014

Background information
- Also known as: Bill Lionel
- Born: April 15, 1960 (age 66); Houston, Texas, U.S.
- Genres: Heavy metal, power metal, speed metal, thrash metal
- Occupation: Singer
- Years active: 1982–present

James Rivera (born April 15, 1960) is an American singer, best known as the frontman for the heavy metal band Helstar. He was also the singer for Seven Witches between 2002 and 2005.

== Biography ==
Rivera got his start singing with power metal act Helstar, a band established in the early 1980s in Houston, Texas. Rivera and guitarist Larry Barragan are the only remaining original members of the band after numerous lineup changes. In addition to Helstar, Rivera has sung with several other metal bands (most notably Destiny's End and Vicious Rumors) during his music career and belonged to several tribute bands.

Rivera, along with Helstar's other founding member Larry Barragan, rebuilt the original band with guitar player Rob Trevino, bass player Jerry Abarca and drummer Russ De Leon (now substituted by Michael Lewis). In 2007 the band released Sins Of The Past, a re-recorded best-of including the most famous Helstar songs. In 2008, came a new brand full-length studio album called King Of Hell. They've released a number of albums since then, most recently in 2016 with Vampiro.

Over the years Rivera and Helstar have been active with their live shows across the United States as well as touring in Europe. Helstar have played the Keep It True Festival and Headbangers Open Air, both in Germany, and the Play It Loud festival in Italy.

In January 2017, it was announced that Rivera was to join UK-based power metal band Shadowkeep and would record vocals for their fourth album.
