= Electric Eye (video) =

Video by Judas Priest
- Released: 24 November 2003
- Genre: Heavy metal
- Length: 168:50
- Label: SMV Enterprises / Sony

Judas Priest chronology
Live in London (2002)	Electric Eye (2003)	Rising in the East (2005)

Electric Eye is a compilation DVD by Judas Priest released in 2003 and certified Platinum by the RIAA. It features music videos, BBC performances, and the first official DVD release of a concert filmed in Dallas, Texas during the 1986 Fuel for Life Tour, previously released as Priest...Live! on VHS and LaserDisc.

== Track listing ==
=== Music Videos ===
1. "Living After Midnight" (1980) – 3:33
2. "Breaking the Law" (1980) – 2:40
3. "Don't Go" (1981) – 3:20
4. "Heading Out to the Highway" (1981) – 3:48
5. "Hot Rockin'" (1981) – 3:07
6. "You've Got Another Thing Comin'" (1982) – 4:23
7. "Freewheel Burning" (1984) – 4:37
8. "Love Bites" (1984) – 4:04
9. "Locked In" (1986) – 4:02
10. "Turbo Lover" (1986) – 4:39
11. "Johnny B. Goode" (1988) – 4:29
12. "Painkiller" (1990) – 6:11
13. "A Touch of Evil" (1990) – 4:37

=== Live – Dallas, Texas 1986 ===
1. "Out in the Cold" – 5:15
2. "Locked In" – 4:56
3. "Heading Out to the Highway" – 4:42
4. "Breaking the Law" – 2:30
5. "Love Bites" – 5:42
6. "Some Heads Are Gonna Roll" – 4:50
7. "The Sentinel" – 5:18
8. "Private Property" – 4:55
9. "Desert Plains" – 4:46
10. "Rock You All Around the World" – 4:51
11. "The Hellion/Electric Eye" – 4:15
12. "Turbo Lover" – 6:09
13. "Freewheel Burning" – 4:35
14. "The Green Manalishi (With the Two Prong Crown)" – 5:10
15. "Parental Guidance" – 4:51
16. "Living After Midnight" – 5:50
17. "You've Got Another Thing Comin'" – 8:24

Encores:

1. "Hell Bent for Leather" – 4:07
2. "Metal Gods" (Incomplete. Song plays over end credits and fades out mid song.)

=== BBC Performances ===
1. "Rocka Rolla" – Old Grey Whistle Test 25/4/75 – 3:15
2. "Dreamer Deceiver" – Old Grey Whistle Test 25/4/75 – 6:29
3. "Take On the World" – Top of the Pops 25/01/79 – 2:26
4. "Evening Star" – Top of the Pops 17/5/79 – 2:39
5. "Living After Midnight" – Top of The Pops 27/3/80 – 3:16
6. "United" – Top of the Pops 28/8/80 – 3:09

== Personnel ==
- Rob Halford – lead vocals, harmonica
- K.K. Downing – guitar, backing vocals
- Glenn Tipton – guitar, backing vocals
- Ian Hill – bass
- Scott Travis – drums

=== Former drummers featured ===
- John Hinch
- Les Binks
- Dave Holland

== Certifications ==
Region	Certification	Certified units/sales
Australia (ARIA)	Gold	7,500^{^}
United States (RIAA)	Platinum	100,000^{^}
^{^} Shipments figures based on certification alone.
