= Unleashed in the East =

Live album by Judas Priest
- Released: 21 September 1979
- Recorded: 10, 15 February 1979
- Venues: Kosei Nenkin Hall and Nakano Sun Plaza, Tokyo
- Genre: Heavy metal
- Length: 44:35
- Label: Columbia
- Producers: Judas Priest; Tom Allom

Judas Priest chronology
| Killing Machine (1978) | Unleashed in the East (1979) | British Steel (1980) |

Singles from Unleashed in the East
- 1. "Diamonds and Rust" Released: December 1979 (US)

Unleashed in the East is the first live album by the English heavy metal band Judas Priest, released in September 1979 on Columbia Records. It was recorded live over two nights in Tokyo during their Hell Bent for Leather Tour in February 1979. Upon release Unleashed became the band's best-selling album up to that point, reaching the US Top 100 and the UK Top Ten, eventually the album became one of the five Judas Priest albums to gain a RIAA platinum certification. It is the first Priest album to be produced by Tom Allom who would remain at the helm for the next decade for the band, and the last release to feature drummer Les Binks.

To what extent the album was really live remains a matter of contention, with the album being nicknamed Unleashed in the Studio by some listeners. Years later, after he had left Priest, Rob Halford noted in various interviews that the music was indeed live, but that his vocals had been ruined in the original recording and were later dubbed in a concert-like studio setting.

== Reissues ==
The 2001 CD reissue featured four "bonus tracks", "Rock Forever," "Delivering the Goods," "Hell Bent for Leather" and "Starbreaker", which had been issued on the 7-inch bonus disc that came with the original 1979 Japanese vinyl release. Three of these were from their then-current album Killing Machine (released in the US as Hell Bent for Leather), which was not well represented on the original release. "Delivering the Goods" and "Starbreaker" had been exclusive to the Japanese release, although the former would be one of the B-side tracks to the "Living After Midnight" 12-inch, released in March 1980.

These four tracks were previously available on the Japanese pressing of the album (titled Priest in the East and having the same track-list as the remaster), and were recorded at the same time as the original nine tracks. Additionally, two more songs were recorded from the same concerts but were only available as B-sides on various singles:

"Evil Fantasies" was on the "Living After Midnight" 12-inch, along with "Delivering the Goods." This live version of "Evil Fantasies" had an official CD release on Single Cuts (2011), albeit with a 6-second edit to the start, which trims Halford's chat slightly.

"Beyond the Realms of Death" was pressed with "Rock Forever" and "Hell Bent for Leather" on a special 3 track live EP that came with initial UK pressings of "Unleashed in the East". There is also a 1979 UK cassette version with 12 songs: "Rock Forever", "Hell Bent for Leather" and "Beyond the Realms of Death" in addition to the original 9 tracks. To date, this version of 'Beyond the Realms of Death' has not been released on CD.

All the extra songs are fully produced, and are of the same quality as the original nine tracks. Certain bootlegs have turned up with all fifteen tracks in the original setlist order, to better reflect the actual concerts of the 1979 tour. (For the record, all the Unleashed in the East recordings were taken from shows on 10 February 1979 at Kosei Nenkin Kaikan Tokyo, and 15 February 1979 at Nakano Sunplaza Tokyo. Additionally, there were two shows on 10 February: an afternoon and an evening show. The two 10 February shows can be found as a bootleg under the title "Tyranny Unleashed in the East.") Two more songs, "White Heat, Red Hot" and "Take on the World" were performed but never officially recorded.

However, the "Take on the World" 12-inch single, released in late 1978, included a live version of "White Heat, Red Hot" recorded at The Agora in Cleveland, Ohio on 9 May 1978 (on the Stained Class Tour). Live versions of "Beyond the Realms of Death" and "Starbreaker" recorded from the same 1978 Cleveland show were released as b-sides to the "Evening Star" 7-inch single and "Take on the World" 12-inch single, respectively. These tracks are available on the Priest, Live and Rare CD. They are not the same versions as on Unleashed in the East. The band was possibly trying to avoid repetition by not including songs on the official full-length live album that were already available as live versions on singles.

== Critical reception ==
Professional ratings
Review scores
| Source | Rating |
|---|---|
| AllMusic | 4/5 stars |
| Rolling Stone | (mixed) |

The Globe and Mail noted that "this absurd piece of bombast was recorded live in Japan and you can pick up every nuance of 120-decibel rock bounding off the audiences' skulls."

== Track listing ==
Side one
| No. | Title | Writer(s) | Original album | Length |
|---|---|---|---|---|
| 1. | "Exciter" | Rob Halford, Glenn Tipton | Stained Class | 5:38 |
| 2. | "Running Wild" | Tipton | Killing Machine | 2:53 |
| 3. | "Sinner" | Halford, Tipton | Sin After Sin | 7:31 |
| 4. | "The Ripper" | Tipton | Sad Wings of Destiny | 2:44 |
| 5. | "The Green Manalishi (With the Two Prong Crown)" (Fleetwood Mac cover) | Peter Green | Killing Machine | 3:16 |

Side two
| No. | Title | Writer(s) | Original album | Length |
|---|---|---|---|---|
| 6. | "Diamonds and Rust" (Joan Baez cover) | Joan Baez | Sin After Sin | 3:30 |
| 7. | "Victim of Changes" | Al Atkins, Halford, K.K. Downing, Tipton | Sad Wings of Destiny | 7:12 |
| 8. | "Genocide" | Halford, Downing, Tipton | Sad Wings of Destiny | 7:19 |
| 9. | "Tyrant" | Halford, Tipton | Sad Wings of Destiny | 4:32 |

Japan 7-inch EP/2001 bonus tracks
| No. | Title | Writer(s) | Original album | Length |
|---|---|---|---|---|
| 10. | "Rock Forever" | Halford, Downing, Tipton | Killing Machine | 3:27 |
| 11. | "Delivering the Goods" | Halford, Downing, Tipton | Killing Machine | 4:07 |
| 12. | "Hell Bent for Leather" | Tipton | Killing Machine | 2:40 |
| 13. | "Starbreaker" | Halford, Downing, Tipton | Sin After Sin | 6:00 |

UK 7-inch EP
| No. | Title | Writer(s) | Original album | Length |
|---|---|---|---|---|
| 1. | "Rock Forever" | Halford, Downing, Tipton | Killing Machine | 3:27 |
| 2. | "Hell Bent for Leather" | Tipton | Killing Machine | 2:40 |
| 3. | "Beyond the Realms of Death" | Halford, Les Binks | Stained Class | 7:20 |

== Personnel ==
Judas Priest

- Rob Halford – vocals
- K. K. Downing – guitars
- Glenn Tipton – guitars
- Ian Hill – bass
- Les Binks – drums

Production

- Produced by Tom Allom and Judas Priest
- Recorded by Yoshihiro Suzuki
- Engineered by Neil Kernon
- Photography by Fin Costello

== Charts ==
| Chart (1979) | Peak position |
|---|---|
| Canada Top Albums/CDs (RPM) | 73 |
| Japanese Albums (Oricon) | 41 |
| UK Albums (Official Charts) | 10 |
| US Billboard 200 | 70 |

== Certifications ==
| Region | Certification | Certified units/sales |
|---|---|---|
| Canada (Music Canada) | Platinum | 100,000^{^} |
| United States (RIAA) | Platinum | 1,000,000^{^} |
^{^} Shipments figures based on certification alone.
