= The Chosen Few (Judas Priest album) =

Compilation album by Judas Priest
- Released: 11 October 2011
- Genre: Heavy metal
- Length: 1:16:58
- Label: Legacy Recordings

Judas Priest chronology
Single Cuts (2011)	The Chosen Few (2011)	The Complete Albums Collection (2012)

Professional ratings
Review scores
Source	Rating
Allmusic	3/5 stars
Blabbermouth.net	8/10
PopMatters	5/10
Record Collector	4/5 stars

The Chosen Few is a compilation album by English heavy metal band Judas Priest, released on 11 October 2011 by Legacy Recordings label.

== Background ==
The album contains Judas Priest songs selected by other heavy metal and hard rock musicians, and was announced on 12 September 2011, for release on 11 October on Legacy Recordings. The entire album was released via an internet stream on AOL Music on 10 October.

During its first week on sale, the album sold about 1,300 copies in the United States.

== Track listing ==
No.	Title	Writer(s)	Artist(s) selected by	Length
1.	"Diamonds & Rust"	Joan Baez	Joe Elliott (of Def Leppard)	3:28
2.	"Dissident Aggressor"	Rob Halford, K.K. Downing, Glenn Tipton	Steve Vai; Geoff Tate (of Queensrÿche)	3:07
3.	"Exciter"	Halford, Tipton	Members of the band Accept	5:34
4.	"Beyond the Realms of Death"	Halford, Les Binks	Lars Ulrich (of Metallica)	6:53
5.	"Delivering the Goods"	Halford, Downing, Tipton	Kerry King (of Slayer)	4:16
6.	"The Green Manalishi (With the Two Prong Crown)"	Peter Green	David Coverdale (of Whitesnake); Randy Blythe (of Lamb of God)	3:23
7.	"The Ripper (Live)"	Tipton	Ozzy Osbourne (of Black Sabbath and 'Solo')	2:42
8.	"Victim of Changes (Live)"	Al Atkins, Halford, Downing, Tipton	James Hetfield (of Metallica)	7:15
9.	"Breaking the Law"	Halford, Downing, Tipton	Lemmy (of Motörhead)	2:35
10.	"Rapid Fire"	Halford, Downing, Tipton	Vinnie Paul (of Pantera and Hellyeah)	4:08
11.	"Grinder"	Halford, Downing, Tipton	Zakk Wylde (of Ozzy Osbourne and Black Label Society)	3:58
12.	"Living After Midnight"	Halford, Downing, Tipton	Alice Cooper; Geezer Butler (of Black Sabbath and Heaven & Hell)	3:31
13.	"Screaming for Vengeance"	Halford, Downing, Tipton	Slash (of Guns N' Roses and Velvet Revolver)	4:43
14.	"You've Got Another Thing Comin'"	Halford, Downing, Tipton	Klaus Meine (of Scorpions); Corey Taylor (of Slipknot and Stone Sour)	5:07
15.	"The Sentinel"	Halford, Downing, Tipton	Chris Jericho (of Fozzy)	5:04
16.	"Turbo Lover"	Halford, Downing, Tipton	Jonathan Davis (of Korn)	5:33
17.	"Painkiller"	Halford, Downing, Tipton	Joe Satriani	6:06
Total length:				1:16:58
