= Mercenaries of Metal Tour =

1988 concert tour by Judas Priest

- Tour by Judas Priest
- European and UK tour program
- Associated album: Ram It Down
- Start date: 7 May 1988
- End date: 23 October 1988
- No. of shows: 105

Judas Priest concert chronology
- Fuel for Life Tour (1986); Mercenaries of Metal Tour (1988); Painkiller Tour (1990–1991)

The Mercenaries of Metal Tour was a 1988 concert tour by English heavy metal band Judas Priest, in support of their most recent release, Ram It Down. Unlike their other tours of the 1980s, no official Judas Priest release includes any live recordings from this tour. It was the final tour the band did with longtime drummer Dave Holland. The week before the tour started, the band visited Stockholm, Sweden for full production rehearsals at Hovet. Before the official tour start, the band played a few warm-up shows including one in a club in Amsterdam, Netherlands in early April 1988, where the footage for the Johnny B. Goode video was shot. On 24 September 1988, just before the band was about to perform a show in Dallas, Texas, they were greeted backstage by the sheriff with a subpoena, leading to the infamous subliminal message trial in the summer of 1990.

== Setlist ==
The average setlist for the tour is as follows, though it varied, such as the addition of "Johnny B. Goode" at several shows in Europe, "Turbo Lover" at several shows in North America, and "Beyond the Realms of Death" at various shows. The setlist also saw the return of "Sinner", which had been a live staple since 1977, but had been dropped like all other pre-Killing Machine songs, except for "Victim of Changes", during the Fuel for Life Tour.

1. "The Hellion / Electric Eye"
2. "Metal Gods"
3. "Sinner"
4. "Breaking the Law"
5. "Come and Get It"
6. "I'm a Rocker"
7. "The Sentinel"
8. "The Ripper"
9. "Beyond the Realms of Death"
10. "Some Heads Are Gonna Roll"
11. "Turbo Lover" (added on July 20, 1988)
12. "Ram It Down"
13. "Heavy Metal"
14. "Victim of Changes"
15. "The Green Manalishi (With the Two Prong Crown)"
16. "Johnny B. Goode" (dropped after May 26, 1988)
17. "Living After Midnight"
18. "Hell Bent for Leather"
19. "You've Got Another Thing Comin'"

== Tour dates ==
The venues and events for the tour were located in Europe and North America. They were supported by Bonfire on the European and British legs, Cinderella on the British and North American legs and Slayer on the North American leg.

Date	City	Country	Venue
Warm-up gig
3 April 1988	Amsterdam	Netherlands	Roxy Club
European leg
7 May 1988	Stockholm	Sweden	Isstadion
8 May 1988	Gothenburg	Sweden	Frölundaborg
9 May 1988	Oslo	Norway	Skedsmohallen
10 May 1988	Copenhagen	Denmark	K.B. Hallen
12 May 1988	West Berlin	West Germany	Deutschlandhalle
14 May 1988	Zwolle	Netherlands	IJsselhallen
15 May 1988	Brussels	Belgium	Forest National
16 May 1988	Paris	France	Le Zénith
18 May 1988	Toulouse	France	Palais des Sports de Toulouse
20 May 1988	Barcelona	Spain	Palau dels Esports de Barcelona
21 May 1988	San Sebastián	Spain	Velódromo de Anoeta
22 May 1988	Madrid	Spain	Auditorio de la Casa de Campo
23 May 1988	Madrid	Spain	Auditorio de la Casa de Campo
26 May 1988	Milan	Italy	Palatrussardi
27 May 1988	Florence	Italy	Palasport
29 May 1988	Lausanne	Switzerland	CIG de Malley
31 May 1988	Würzburg	West Germany	Carl Diem Halle
1 June 1988	Ludwigshafen	West Germany	Friedrich-Ebert-Halle
2 June 1988	Munich	West Germany	Olympiahalle
4 June 1988	Jübek	West Germany	Sandbahn-Stadion
5 June 1988	Oldenburg	West Germany	Weser-Ems Halle
7 June 1988	Offenbach am Main	West Germany	Stadthalle Offenbach
8 June 1988	Ulm	West Germany	Halle 10
9 June 1988	Böblingen	West Germany	Sporthalle
10 June 1988	Cologne	West Germany	Sporthalle
12 June 1988	Birmingham	England	Powerhouse
13 June 1988	London	England	Hammersmith Odeon
14 June 1988	London	England	Hammersmith Odeon
16 June 1988	Leicester	England	De Montfort Hall
17 June 1988	Edinburgh	Scotland	Edinburgh Playhouse
18 June 1988	Newcastle upon Tyne	England	Newcastle City Hall
19 June 1988	Manchester	England	Manchester Apollo
21 June 1988	Newport	Wales	Newport Centre
22 June 1988	Sheffield	England	Sheffield City Hall
North American leg
20 July 1988	Montreal	Canada	Montreal Forum
22 July 1988	Toronto	Canada	CNE Grandstand
24 July 1988	Ottawa	Canada	Ottawa Civic Centre
26 July 1988	Worcester	United States	Worcester Centrum
27 July 1988	Middletown	United States	Orange County Fairgrounds
28 July 1988	Uniondale	United States	Nassau Veterans Memorial Coliseum
29 July 1988	East Rutherford	United States	Meadowlands Arena
30 July 1988	Uniondale	United States	Nassau Veterans Memorial Coliseum
31 July 1988	Providence	United States	Providence Civic Center
2 August 1988	Philadelphia	United States	Spectrum
5 August 1988	Saratoga Springs	United States	Saratoga Performing Arts Center
6 August 1988	Rochester	United States	Rochester Community War Memorial
7 August 1988	New Haven	United States	New Haven Coliseum
8 August 1988	Binghamton	United States	Broome County Arena
10 August 1988	Hershey	United States	Hersheypark Stadium
11 August 1988	Buffalo	United States	Buffalo Memorial Auditorium
12 August 1988	Landover	United States	Capital Centre
13 August 1988	Landover	United States	Capital Centre
14 August 1988	Hampton	United States	Hampton Coliseum
15 August 1988	Columbus	United States	Ohio Center
16 August 1988	Dayton	United States	Hara Arena
17 August 1988	Richfield	United States	Richfield Coliseum
19 August 1988	Toledo	United States	Toledo Sports Arena
20 August 1988	Auburn Hills	United States	The Palace of Auburn Hills
21 August 1988	Charlevoix	United States	Castle Farms
23 August 1988	Indianapolis	United States	Market Square Arena
24 August 1988	Chicago	United States	Rosemont Horizon
26 August 1988	Milwaukee	United States	Mecca Arena
27 August 1988	Minneapolis	United States	Met Center
28 August 1988	East Troy	United States	Alpine Valley Music Theatre
29 August 1988	Bonner Springs	United States	Sandstone Amphitheater
30 August 1988	St. Louis	United States	Kiel Auditorium
3 September 1988	Pittsburgh	United States	Pittsburgh Civic Arena
8 September 1988	Greensboro	United States	Greensboro Coliseum
9 September 1988	Charlotte	United States	Charlotte Coliseum
10 September 1988	Nashville	United States	Starwood Amphitheatre
11 September 1988	Birmingham	United States	Boutwell Auditorium
13 September 1988	Memphis	United States	Mid-South Coliseum
14 September 1988	Atlanta	United States	Omni Coliseum
16 September 1988	Jacksonville	United States	Jacksonville Coliseum
17 September 1988	Lakeland	United States	Lakeland Civic Center
18 September 1988	Pembroke Pines	United States	Hollywood Sportatorium
20 September 1988	Shreveport	United States	Hirsch Memorial Coliseum
21 September 1988	New Orleans	United States	Lakefront Arena
23 September 1988	Houston	United States	The Summit
24 September 1988	Dallas	United States	Starplex Amphitheatre
25 September 1988	San Antonio	United States	HemisFair Arena
27 September 1988	Austin	United States	Frank Erwin Center
28 September 1988	Lubbock	United States	Lubbock Municipal Coliseum
29 September 1988	El Paso	United States	El Paso County Coliseum
30 September 1988	Reno	United States	Lawlor Events Center
1 October 1988	Salt Lake City	United States	Salt Palace
2 October 1988	Denver	United States	McNichols Sports Arena
4 October 1988	Albuquerque	United States	Tingley Coliseum
6 October 1988	Chandler	United States	Compton Terrace
7 October 1988	San Francisco	United States	Cow Palace
8 October 1988	San Francisco	United States	Cow Palace
9 October 1988	Sacramento	United States	Cal Expo Amphitheater
10 October 1988	Mountain View	United States	Shoreline Amphitheatre
11 October 1988	Fresno	United States	Selland Arena
12 October 1988	San Diego	United States	San Diego Sports Arena
13 October 1988	Los Angeles	United States	The Forum
14 October 1988	Los Angeles	United States	The Forum
15 October 1988	Laguna Hills	United States	Irvine Meadows Amphitheatre
16 October 1988	Laguna Hills	United States	Irvine Meadows Amphitheatre
18 October 1988	Spokane	United States	Spokane Coliseum
19 October 1988	Seattle	United States	Seattle Center Coliseum
20 October 1988	Portland	United States	Portland Coliseum
22 October 1988	Vancouver	Canada	Pacific Coliseum

== Personnel ==
- Rob Halford – lead vocals
- Glenn Tipton – guitar
- K. K. Downing – guitar
- Ian Hill – bass
- Dave Holland – drums
- Jim Silvia – tour manager
