= Priest...Live! =

Live album by Judas Priest
- Released: 1 June 1987
- Recorded: The Omni, Atlanta, Georgia on 15 June 1986, Reunion Arena, Dallas, Texas on 27 June 1986
- Genre: Heavy metal
- Length: 74:00
- Label: Columbia
- Producer: Tom Allom

Judas Priest chronology
Turbo (1986)	Priest...Live! (1987)	Ram It Down (1988)

Professional ratings
Review scores
Source	Rating
AllMusic	1.5/5 stars
Kerrang!	5/5 stars
PopMatters	(favourable)
Martin Popoff	6/10 stars

Priest...Live! is the second live album by English heavy metal band Judas Priest, recorded at The Omni, Atlanta, Georgia on 15 June 1986 and the Reunion Arena, Dallas, Texas on 27 June 1986, and released in the UK on 1 June 1987.

== Overview ==
All of the songs on Priest...Live! were recorded on their 1986 Fuel for Life tour which supported the album Turbo. There were no tracks from their 1970s albums, though the 2001 remastered version did contain "Hell Bent for Leather" as a bonus track. While it may have sounded more "live" than Unleashed in the East, Priest...Live! did not sell as well as that album. However, the RIAA certified it Gold in October 2001.

The version of "Heading Out to the Highway" on this album includes separate guitar solos by K. K. Downing and Glenn Tipton that were not on the original studio version, while the performance of "Breaking the Law" includes an additional Downing solo.

The album was first released on 1 June 1987 as a 2-LP set in a gatefold sleeve with artwork inners. It was re-released as part of the 2001 'The Re-Masters' series and includes three live bonus tracks.

The live video was recorded in its entirety at the Reunion Arena in Dallas, Texas on 27 June 1986, and was released on Betamax, VHS and LaserDisc in 1987. The video includes the songs "Locked In", "Desert Plains", "The Green Manalishi (With the Two Prong Crown)" and "Hell Bent for Leather", which were left off the original vinyl/cassette/CD release, and was certified Gold in February 1988. The video for this concert was featured on the Judas Priest DVD Electric Eye in 2003.

== Track listing ==
=== Original release ===
All tracks are written by Glenn Tipton, Rob Halford and K.K. Downing, except where noted.

Side one
No.	Title	Length
1.	"Out in the Cold"	6:51
2.	"Heading Out to the Highway"	4:53
3.	"Metal Gods"	4:11
4.	"Breaking the Law"	2:42

Side two
No.	Title	Length
5.	"Love Bites"	5:27
6.	"Some Heads Are Gonna Roll" (Robert Halligan Jr)	4:23
7.	"The Sentinel"	5:13
8.	"Private Property"	4:51

Side three
No.	Title	Length
1.	"Rock You All Around the World"	4:41
2.	"Electric Eye"	4:19
3.	"Turbo Lover"	5:53
4.	"Freewheel Burning"	5:01

Side four
No.	Title	Length
5.	"Parental Guidance"	4:10
6.	"Living After Midnight"	7:24
7.	"You've Got Another Thing Comin'"	8:05

=== 2001 'The Re-Masters' edition track listing ===
All tracks are written by Glenn Tipton, Rob Halford and K.K. Downing, except where indicated.

Disc one
No.	Title	Writer(s)	Length
1.	"Out in the Cold"		6:51
2.	"Heading Out to the Highway"		4:53
3.	"Metal Gods"		4:11
4.	"Breaking the Law"		2:42
5.	"Love Bites"		5:27
6.	"Some Heads Are Gonna Roll"	Robert Halligan Jr.	4:23
7.	"The Sentinel"		5:13
8.	"Private Property"		4:51

Disc two
No.	Title	Writer(s)	Length
1.	"Rock You All Around the World"		4:41
2.	"Electric Eye"		4:19
3.	"Turbo Lover"		5:53
4.	"Freewheel Burning"		5:01
5.	"Parental Guidance"		4:10
6.	"Living After Midnight"		7:24
7.	"You've Got Another Thing Comin'"		8:05
8.	"Screaming for Vengeance" (recorded live in Memphis, TN, 12 December 1982 during the Screaming for Vengeance tour)		5:55
9.	"Rock Hard, Ride Free" (recorded live in Los Angeles, CA, 5 May 1984 during the Defenders of the Faith tour)		6:42
10.	"Hell Bent for Leather" (recorded live in Saint Louis, MO, 23 May 1986 on the Turbo tour)	Glenn Tipton	4:42

== Personnel ==
Judas Priest

- Rob Halford – vocals
- K. K. Downing – guitar
- Glenn Tipton – guitar
- Ian Hill – bass
- Dave Holland – drums

Production

- Produced by Tom Allom
- Engineered by Patrice Wilkison Levinsohn, assisted by Charles Dye
- Mastered by Mike Fuller
- Art direction by Richard Evans (designer)Richard Evans
- Photography by Neil Zlozower

== Charts ==
Chart (1987)	Peak position
Australian Albums (Kent Music Report)	72
Austrian Albums (Ö3 Austria)	22
Canada Top Albums/CDs (RPM)	39
Dutch Albums (Album Top 100)	68
Finnish Albums (The Official Finnish Charts)	7
German Albums (Offizielle Top 100)	23
Japanese Albums (Oricon)	48
Norwegian Albums (VG-lista)	16
Swedish Albums (Sverigetopplistan)	19
Swiss Albums (Schweizer Hitparade)	18
UK Albums (Official Charts)	47
US Billboard 200	38

== Certifications ==
Region	Certification	Certified units/sales
Canada (Music Canada)	Gold	50,000^{^}
United States (RIAA)	Gold	500,000^{^}
United States (RIAA) 1987 VHS	Gold	50,000^{^}
^{^} Shipments figures based on certification alone.
