= Heavy metal gallop =

Beat or rhythm in heavy metal songs

A gallop is a beat or rhythm typically used in traditional heavy metal songs. It is created by playing an eighth note followed by two sixteenth notes, usually on rhythm guitar, drums, or bass.

Gallop on bass
Gallop played on a bass with a pick

Gallop played on drums
Gallop pattern played on drums

Gallop triplet variation
Triplet gallop variation on MIDI guitar

One technique on guitar involves strumming palm muted power chords in an up-and-down motion with a pick, thereby creating an ostinato. Variations include the triplet gallop and the reverse gallop.

On drums, the technique often uses a double kick pedal. A typical drum gallop is formed around this skeleton:

H- x---x---x---x---|
S- ----o-------o---|
B- o-ooo-ooo-ooo-oo|

== Examples of early or "proto" gallops ==
Several early examples are variations on the pattern that do not strictly use the "eighth note followed by two sixteenth notes", but nonetheless have been identified as gallops.

- "Hard Lovin' Man" – Deep Purple (Deep Purple in Rock, 1970)
- "Immigrant Song" – Led Zeppelin (Led Zeppelin III, 1970)
- "Children of the Grave" – Black Sabbath (Master of Reality, 1971)
- "Highway Star" – Deep Purple (Machine Head, 1972)
- "Keep Yourself Alive" – Queen (Queen, 1973)

== Examples of songs using the gallop ==
- "Great King Rat" – Queen (Queen, 1973)
- "Achilles Last Stand" – Led Zeppelin (Presence, 1976)
- "Barracuda" – Heart (Little Queen, 1977)
- "Exciter" – Judas Priest (Stained Class, 1978)
- "Stained Class" – Judas Priest (Stained Class, 1978)
- "Air Dance" – Black Sabbath (Never Say Die!, 1978)
- "The Oath" – Kiss (Music from "The Elder", 1981)
- "Killers" – Iron Maiden (Killers, 1981)
- "Run to the Hills" – Iron Maiden (The Number of the Beast, 1982)
- "The Trooper" – Iron Maiden (Piece Of Mind, 1983)
- "The Four Horsemen" – Metallica (Kill 'Em All, 1983)
- "Motorbreath" – Metallica (Kill 'Em All, 1983)
- "Holy Diver" – Dio (Holy Diver, 1983)
- "Exciter" – Kiss (Lick It Up, 1983)
- "Fight Fire with Fire" – Metallica (Ride the Lightning), 1984)
- "Disposable Heroes" – Metallica (Master of Puppets, 1986)
- "Damage, Inc." – Metallica (Master of Puppets, 1986)
- "Raining Blood" – Slayer (Reign in Blood, 1986)
- "Over the Wall" – Testament (The Legacy, 1987)
- "Headless Cross" – Black Sabbath (Headless Cross, 1989)
