= Epitaph World Tour =

2011–12 concert tour by Judas Priest

- Tour by Judas Priest
- Promotional poster for the tour
- Location: Asia; Europe; North America; South America
- Start date: 7 June 2011
- End date: 26 May 2012
- No. of shows: 120; 63 in Europe; 40 in North America; 9 in Asia; 8 in South America

Judas Priest concert chronology
- Nostradamus World Tour (2008–2009); Epitaph World Tour (2011–2012); Redeemer of Souls Tour (2014–2015)

The Epitaph World Tour was a concert tour by English heavy metal band Judas Priest, at the time intended to be the band's farewell tour. The tour commenced in June 2011 and concluded in May 2012. The tour was named after the 6th track from their Sad Wings of Destiny album.

Guitarist K. K. Downing abruptly left the band shortly before the start of the tour. He was replaced by then 31-year-old Briton, Richie Faulkner. The last date of the tour was held in an unusually small venue, London's Hammersmith Apollo. This return to Judas Priest's homeland was filmed for a live DVD.

Epitaph would ultimately turn out not to be the band's final tour, as they embarked on the Redeemer of Souls Tour two years later.

== Production ==
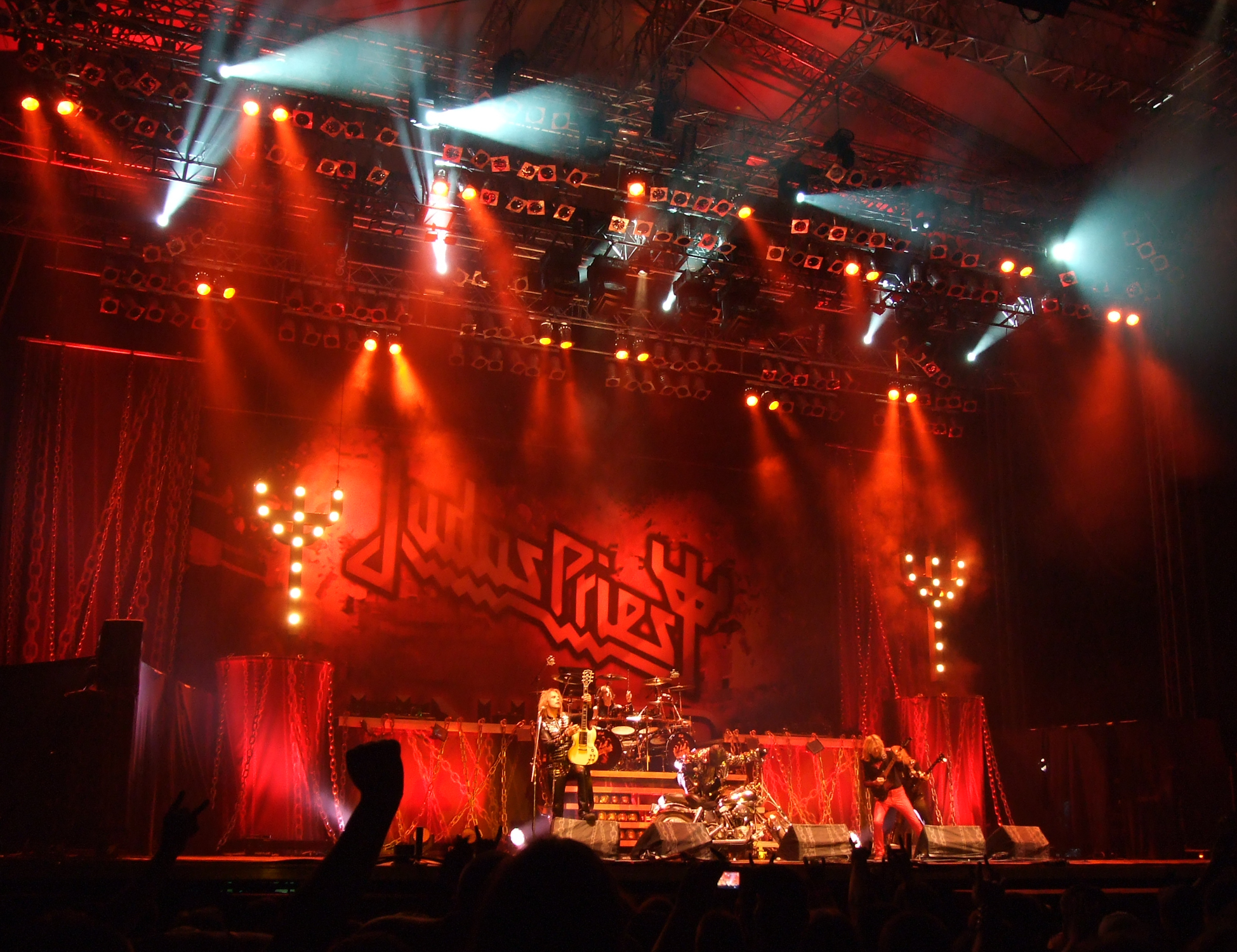
Stage production for the Epitaph World Tour

On 10 May, the band announced that preparations for the tour had begun, including rehearsals, photos, stage construction, and special effects.

On 6 June, guitarist Glenn Tipton announced on his website that:

We have just finished production rehearsals for our Epitaph World Tour; the show looks great bikes, lasers, flames you name it, we've got it.

But as always, the most important thing is the music and the set list contains all the old favorites combined with songs we haven't played before live, such as "Blood Red Skies" and "Never Satisfied", and also earlier songs, including "Starbreaker" and "Night Crawler".

In addition we changed the arrangement of some songs slightly, including "Diamonds and Rust" and "Hell Bent for Leather", which I'm sure every one will enjoy.

Our first show is in Holland on June 7th at Tilburg; the band is really excited and can't wait to get back on stage. I will post regular bulletins from now and as the tour gets underway keep every body up-to-date on our progress.

== Rob Halford incident ==
On the 15 September 2011 show in Brasília, Rob Halford fell off his Harley-Davidson motorcycle when he rode across the stage, only to slip off as "Hell Bent for Leather" was set to be performed. This was reminiscent of an incident that occurred on the Operation Rock & Roll tour in 1991, but this time he did not sustain any major injuries. He was assisted by crew members as the intro piece began, and finished the show thereafter.

== Tour dates ==
Date	City	Country	Venue/Event
Europe, Leg #1
7 June 2011	Tilburg	Netherlands	013
9 June 2011	Sölvesborg	Sweden	Sweden Rock Festival
11 June 2011	Tampere	Finland	Sauna Open Air Metal Festival
14 June 2011	Oslo	Norway	Oslo Spektrum
15 June 2011	Bergen	Norway	Edvard Griegsplass
17 June 2011	Copenhagen	Denmark	Copenhell Festival
19 June 2011	Clisson	France	Hellfest
20 June 2011	Paris	France	Le Zénith
22 June 2011	Milan	Italy	Gods of Metal Festival
23 June 2011	Basel	Switzerland	Sonisphere Festival
25 June 2011	Dessel	Belgium	Graspop Metal Meeting Festival
27 June 2011	Munich	Germany	Zenith
28 June 2011	Prague	Czech Republic	O_{2} Arena
29 June 2011	Vienna	Austria	Wiener Stadthalle
1 July 2011	Belgrade	Serbia	Beogradska Arena
3 July 2011	Bucharest	Romania	Piața Constituției
5 July 2011	Athens	Greece	Faliro Olympic Complex
6 July 2011	Thessaloniki	Greece	Kaftanzoglio Stadium
8 July 2011	Sofia	Bulgaria	Balgarska Armia Stadium
10 July 2011	Istanbul	Turkey	Maçka Küçükçiftlik Park
15 July 2011	Newport	Wales	Newport Centre
16 July 2011	Manchester	England	O_{2} Apollo
17 July 2011	Doncaster	England	The Dome
19 July 2011	Glasgow	Scotland	SECC
20 July 2011	Newcastle	England	Metro Radio Arena
21 July 2011	Wolverhampton	England	Wolverhampton Civic Hall
23 July 2011	London	England	High Voltage Festival
24 July 2011	Bournemouth	England	Bournemouth International Centre
27 July 2011	Lisbon	Portugal	Pavilhão Atlântico
29 July 2011	A Coruña	Spain	Coliseum da Coruña
30 July 2011	Madrid	Spain	Plaza de Toros La Cubierta
31 July 2011	Bilbao	Spain	Bizkaia Arena
2 August 2011	Barcelona	Spain	Palau Municipal d'Esports Badelona
5 August 2011	Wacken	Germany	Wacken Open Air
7 August 2011	Colmar	France	Foire aux Vins Festival
9 August 2011	Berlin	Germany	O_{2} World
10 August 2011	Katowice	Poland	Spodek
11 August 2011	Budapest	Hungary	Sziget Festival
Latin America
10 September 2011	São Paulo	Brazil	Arena Anhembi
11 September 2011	Rio de Janeiro	Brazil	Citibank Hall
13 September 2011	Belo Horizonte	Brazil	Chevrolet Hall
15 September 2011	Brasília	Brazil	Ginásio Nilson Nelson
18 September 2011	Buenos Aires	Argentina	El Cilindro
20 September 2011	Santiago	Chile	Movistar Arena
23 September 2011	Bogotá	Colombia	Coliseo Cubierto el Campín
25 September 2011	Caracas	Venezuela	Terraza del C.C.C.T.
27 September 2011	San José	Costa Rica	Estadio Nacional
30 September 2011	Mexico City	Mexico	Palacio de los Deportes
1 October 2011	Guadalajara	Mexico	Auditorio Telmex
3 October 2011	Monterrey	Mexico	Auditorio Banamex
North America
12 October 2011	San Antonio	United States	AT&T Center
14 October 2011	Corpus Christi	United States	Concrete Street Amphitheater
15 October 2011	The Woodlands	United States	Cynthia Woods Mitchell Pavilion
16 October 2011	Allen	United States	Allen Event Center
18 October 2011	Tucson	United States	AVA Amphitheater
19 October 2011	Chula Vista	United States	Cricket Wireless Amphitheatre
21 October 2011	Phoenix	United States	Arizona State Fair
22 October 2011	San Bernardino	United States	San Manuel Amphitheater
23 October 2011	Las Vegas	United States	The Joint
25 October 2011	Bakersfield	United States	Rabobank Arena
27 October 2011	Concord	United States	Sleep Train Pavilion
29 October 2011	Seattle	United States	WaMu Theater
30 October 2011	Vancouver	Canada	Rogers Arena
1 November 2011	Edmonton	Canada	Shaw Conference Centre
2 November 2011	Calgary	Canada	Scotiabank Saddledome
4 November 2011	West Valley City	United States	Maverik Center
5 November 2011	Broomfield	United States	1stBank Center
8 November 2011	Cincinnati	United States	U.S. Bank Arena
9 November 2011	Springfield	United States	Prairie Capital Convention Center
10 November 2011	St. Charles	United States	Family Arena
12 November 2011	Hammond	United States	The Venue at Horseshoe Casino
13 November 2011	Detroit	United States	Joe Louis Arena
15 November 2011	Cleveland	United States	Quicken Loans Arena
16 November 2011	Rochester	United States	Main Street Armory
18 November 2011	East Rutherford	United States	Izod Center
19 November 2011	Johnstown	United States	Cambria County War Memorial Arena
20 November 2011	Lowell	United States	Tsongas Center
22 November 2011	Toronto	Canada	Air Canada Centre
23 November 2011	Quebec City	Canada	Colisée Pepsi
24 November 2011	Montreal	Canada	Bell Centre
26 November 2011	Reading	United States	Sovereign Center
27 November 2011	Winston-Salem	United States	Lawrence Joel Veterans Memorial Coliseum
30 November 2011	Tampa	United States	1-800-ASK-GARY Amphitheatre
1 December 2011	Miami	United States	Bayfront Park Amphitheater
3 December 2011	Biloxi	United States	Hard Rock Hotel and Casino
Asia
4 February 2012	Seoul	South Korea	Olympic Gymnastics Arena
7 February 2012	Fukuoka	Japan	Sun Palace
9 February 2012	Yokohama	Japan	Pacifico Yokohama
11 February 2012	Kobe	Japan	Kobe Kokusai Hall
13 February 2012	Hiroshima	Japan	Alsok Hall
14 February 2012	Nagoya	Japan	Aichi Prefectural Arts Theater
16 February 2012	Tokyo	Japan	Zepp
17 February 2012	Tokyo	Japan	Nippon Budokan
20 February 2012	Central Area	Singapore	Fort Canning
Europe, Leg #2
14 April 2012	Katowice	Poland	Spodek
16 April 2012	Kyiv	Ukraine	Palace of Sports
18 April 2012	Moscow	Russia	Stadium Live
20 April 2012	Saint Petersburg	Russia	Yubileyny Sports Palace
22 April 2012	Helsinki	Finland	Helsingin Jäähalli
24 April 2012	Linköping	Sweden	Cloetta Center
25 April 2012	Stockholm	Sweden	Hovet
27 April 2012	Hamburg	Germany	Alsterdorfer Sporthalle
28 April 2012	Leipzig	Germany	Arena Leipzig
30 April 2012	Münster	Germany	Halle Münsterland
1 May 2012	Düsseldorf	Germany	Mitsubishi Electric Halle
3 May 2012	Stuttgart	Germany	Porsche-Arena
4 May 2012	Nuremberg	Germany	Arena Nürnberger Versicherung
5 May 2012	Linz	Austria	TipsArena Linz
8 May 2012	Pardubice	Czech Republic	ČEZ Aréna
9 May 2012	Bratislava	Slovakia	Incheba Hall
11 May 2012	Mantua	Italy	PalaBam
12 May 2012	Fribourg	Switzerland	Forum
15 May 2012	Madrid	Spain	Palacio Vistalegre
16 May 2012	Barcelona	Spain	Palau Sant Jordi
18 May 2012	Seville	Spain	Auditorio Municipal Rocío Jurado
20 May 2012	San Sebastián	Spain	Velódromo de Anoeta
23 May 2012	Antwerp	Belgium	Lotto Arena
24 May 2012	Kerkrade	Netherlands	Rodahal
26 May 2012	London	England	Hammersmith Apollo

== Setlist ==
According to a posting on Tipton's website on 27 January 2011, the tour will "include some classic Priest songs that we haven't played before -- and of course, the old favourites that everybody will want to hear." On 15 February, the band announced they were considering playing at least one song from each of their albums as part of the setlist.

The setlist for the first leg of the tour was as follows:

1. "Battle Hymn"
2. "Rapid Fire"
3. "Metal Gods"
4. "Heading Out to the Highway"
5. "Judas Rising"
6. "Starbreaker"
7. "Victim of Changes"
8. "Never Satisfied"
9. "Diamonds and Rust" (acoustic to heavy version)
10. "Prophecy"
11. "Night Crawler"
12. "Turbo Lover"
13. "Beyond the Realms of Death"
14. "The Sentinel"
15. "Blood Red Skies"
16. "The Green Manalishi (with the Two Prong Crown)"
17. "Breaking the Law"
18. "Painkiller"
19. "The Hellion"/"Electric Eye"
20. "Hell Bent for Leather"
21. "You've Got Another Thing Comin'"
22. "Living After Midnight"

Note: The band played a shorter set with omitted songs at certain festival appearances.

== Reviews ==
A review of the band's performance at the Sonisphere Festival in Basel, Switzerland by RockAAA.com was favourable, praising both Rob Halford's vocal performance and Richie Faulkner's guitar playing. The reviewer said that Halford's "tone is astonishing...and [his] delivery as good as there is in the business."

== Support acts ==
- Black Label Society (12 October – 3 December 2011)
- Crash (4 February 2012)
- Diablo ft. Yim Jae-beom (4 February 2012)
- Duff McKagan's Loaded (20 June 2011)
- Exodus (10 August 2011)
- HammerFall (22–25 April 2012)
- Hatebreed (3 July 2011)
- Kobra and the Lotus (26 May 2012)
- Lamb of God (20 February 2012)
- Morbid Angel (10 August 2011)
- Motörhead (29 July – 2 August 2011)
- Queensrÿche (15–27 July 2011)
- Rival Sons (15–24 July 2011)
- Sabaton (9 August 2011)
- Saxon (29 July – 2 August 2011; 23–26 May 2012)
- Thin Lizzy (12 October – 3 December 2011; 27 April – 4 May 2012)
- Vader (10 August 2011)
- Whitesnake (27 June – 10 July 2011; 10 September – 3 October 2011)
- Leash Eye (14 April 2012)

== Personnel ==
- Rob Halford – lead vocals
- Glenn Tipton – guitar
- Richie Faulkner – guitar
- Ian Hill – bass
- Scott Travis – drums
