= Single Cuts =

Box set by Judas Priest
- Released: 17 October 2011
- Genre: Heavy metal

Single Cuts is a limited edition box set by English heavy metal band Judas Priest consisting of 20 of the band's singles on 20 CDs including all original B-sides, making a total of 51 tracks. It was announced on 7 June 2011, for release on 25 August, later delayed to 17 October for "technical reasons", with free magnets being offered as a compensation for the delay to anyone who pre-ordered the box set.

== Track listing ==
The compilation contains all 20 of the songs Judas Priest released as singles on Columbia Records and CBS Records between 1977 and 1992 in the United Kingdom, including all original B-sides.

Diamonds & Rust (April 1977)
No.	Title	Length
1.	"Diamonds & Rust"	3:23
2.	"Dissident Aggressor"	3:06

Better By You, Better Than Me (January 1978)
No.	Title	Length
1.	"Better By You, Better Than Me"	3:20
2.	"Invader"	4:00

Evening Star (September 1978)
No.	Title	Length
1.	"Evening Star (single edit)"	2:50
2.	"Starbreaker (Live)"	7:19

Before The Dawn (October 1978)
No.	Title	Length
1.	"Before The Dawn"	3:21
2.	"Rock Forever"	3:19

Take On The World (January 1979)
No.	Title	Length
1.	"Take On The World"	3:00
2.	"White Heat Red Hot (Live At The Agora Ballroom, Cleveland, May 1978)"	4:30
3.	"Starbreaker (Live At The Agora Ballroom, Cleveland, May 1978)"	7:19

Evening Star (April 1979)
No.	Title	Length
1.	"Evening Star (single edit)"	2:50
2.	"Beyond The Realms Of Death (Live At The Agora Ballroom, Cleveland, May 1978)"	7:04
3.	"The Green Manalishi (With the Two Prong Crown)"	3:22

Living After Midnight (March 1980)
No.	Title	Length
1.	"Living After Midnight" (single edit)"	3:11
2.	"Delivering The Goods (Live In Tokyo)"	4:07
3.	"Evil Fantasies (Live In Tokyo)"	4:28

Breaking The Law (May 1980)
No.	Title	Length
1.	"Breaking The Law"	2:34
2.	"Metal Gods"	3:59

United (August 1980)
No.	Title	Length
1.	"United"	3:31
2.	"Grinder"	3:57

Don't Go (February 1981)
No.	Title	Length
1.	"Don't Go"	3:17
2.	"Solar Angels"	4:02

Hot Rockin' (April 1981)
No.	Title	Length
1.	"Hot Rockin' (single edit)"	3:03
2.	"Breaking The Law (Live February 1981)"	2:38
3.	"Living After Midnight (Live February 1981)"	4:19

You've Got Another Thing Comin' (August 1982)
No.	Title	Length
1.	"You've Got Another Thing Comin' (single edit)"	4:24
2.	"Exciter (Live)"	5:37

Chains (October 1982)
No.	Title	Length
1.	"(Take These) Chains"	3:05
2.	"Judas Priest Audio File"	8:11

Freewheel Burning (January 1984)
No.	Title	Length
1.	"Freewheel Burning"	4:21
2.	"Breaking The Law (Live From US Festival 29 May 1983)"	2:40
3.	"You've Got Another Thing Comin'"	5:09

Some Heads Are Gonna Roll (February 1984)
No.	Title	Length
1.	"Some Heads Are Gonna Roll"	4:03
2.	"Jawbreaker"	3:26
3.	"The Green Manalishi (With the Two Pronged Crown) (Live at The Palladium, NYC, July 1981)"	4:42

Turbo Lover (April 1986)
No.	Title	Length
1.	"Turbo Lover (single edit)"	4:38
2.	"Hot For Love"	4:11

Locked In (May 1986)
No.	Title	Length
1.	"Locked In"	3:52
2.	"Reckless"	4:18
3.	"Desert Plains (Live)"	5:08
4.	"Freewheel Burning (Live)"	5:01

Painkiller (September 1990)
No.	Title	Length
1.	"Painkiller"	6:03
2.	"United"	3:32
3.	"Better By You, Better Than Me"	3:22

A Touch of Evil (March 1991)
No.	Title	Length
1.	"A Touch of Evil (single edit)"	4:12
2.	"Between The Hammer And The Anvil"	4:48
3.	"You've Got Another Thing Comin' (Live)"	7:46

Night Crawler (April 1992)
No.	Title	Length
1.	"Night Crawler (single edit)"	4:05
2.	"Breaking The Law (Live)"	2:42
3.	"Living After Midnight (Live)"	7:24

== Charts ==
Chart (2011)	Peak position
UK Rock & Metal Albums (Official Charts)	39
