= Ram It Down =

- Cover art by Mark Wilkinson

Studio album by Judas Priest
- Released: 13 May 1988
- Recorded: December 1987 – March 1988
- Studios: Ibiza Sound Studio, Ibiza; Puk Recording Studios, Gjerlev
- Genre: Heavy metal
- Length: 49:33
- Label: Columbia
- Producers: Tom Allom; Glenn Tipton; Rob Halford; K. K. Downing

Judas Priest chronology
Priest...Live! (1987)	Ram It Down (1988)	Painkiller (1990)

Singles from Ram It Down
- 1. "Johnny B. Goode" Released: 18 April 1988; 2. "Ram It Down" Released: 1988 (NL)

Professional ratings
Review scores
Source	Rating
AllMusic	2/5 stars
PopMatters	(poor)
Martin Popoff	6/10 stars
Sputnikmusic	2.5/5 stars

Ram It Down is the eleventh studio album by English heavy metal band Judas Priest, released on 13 May 1988 by Columbia Records. It was the band's last album to feature longtime drummer Dave Holland, and was promoted in Europe and North America with the Mercenaries of Metal Tour.

On 18 July 1988, the album earned gold certification for shipments of over 500,000 copies. In 2001, it was remastered and reissued with two bonus tracks.

== Background ==
In 1986, Judas Priest intended to release a double album entitled Twin Turbos, of which half would consist of melodic, more commercial hard rock, and the other half would be heavier and less synth-driven. Columbia Records objected to the double album concept, and the project was ultimately split into two separate releases, 1986's Turbo, and 1988's Ram It Down. At least four songs, "Ram it Down", "Hard as Iron", "Love You to Death" and "Monsters of Rock", were written for the Twin Turbos project.

Ram It Down would be the final Judas Priest album for 30 years recorded with producer Tom Allom. Allom would later return as co-producer to the 2009 live release A Touch of Evil: Live. He would not produce another Judas Priest studio album until 2018's Firepower.

The band recorded a rendition of Chuck Berry's "Johnny B. Goode", intended for inclusion on the soundtrack for the 1988 Anthony Michael Hall comedy film Johnny Be Good; the song found its way onto Ram It Down and was the album's first single. It was played during the first few concerts of the band's 1988 tour, along with the title track and three other songs from the album, namely "Heavy Metal", "Come And Get It" and "I'm a Rocker". The only Ram It Down songs to have ever been played on later tours are "I'm a Rocker", during the 2005 Retribution Tour; and "Blood Red Skies" during the 2011-2012 Epitaph World Tour and the 2021-2022 50 Heavy Metal Years Tour.

== Reception ==
Although Judas Priest's fanbase was big enough to push the album to gold status in North America, critical reaction was fairly negative. Several retrospective reviews have considered the album's songs and performances stale and routine. Allmusic's Steve Huey argued that, despite the band's conscious attempt at "delivering a straight-ahead, much more typical Priest album" compared to Turbo, the album "generally sounds like it's on autopilot" and lacking in personality, with "pretty lackluster" songwriting and "too-polished, mechanical-sounding production", ultimately deeming it the lowest point of Halford's tenure in the band. Adrien Begrand of PopMatters remarked that the Judas Priest of Ram It Down was a "sorry self-parody" that had lost touch with the heavy metal scene, and described the album's material as composed of "Spinal Tap clichés".

Halford's take on the rest of the album is that it was "a very heavy record", with Glenn Tipton and K. K. Downing "really rip[ping] it up on a lot of those riffs". Halford said the band recorded a cover of the Rolling Stones' "Play with Fire"; he said it was "a shame" that the song did not make the album.

== Track listing ==
All tracks are written by Glenn Tipton, Rob Halford and K. K. Downing, except where noted.

Side one
No.	Title	Length
1.	"Ram It Down"	4:48
2.	"Heavy Metal"	5:58
3.	"Love Zone"	3:58
4.	"Come and Get It"	4:07
5.	"Hard as Iron"	4:09

Side two
No.	Title	Length
6.	"Blood Red Skies"	7:50
7.	"I'm a Rocker"	3:58
8.	"Johnny B. Goode" (Chuck Berry)	4:39
9.	"Love You to Death"	4:36
10.	"Monsters of Rock"	5:30
Total length:		49:33

2001 CD edition bonus tracks
No.	Title	Length
11.	"Night Comes Down" (Live at Long Beach Arena, Long Beach, California, 5 May 1984)	4:33
12.	"Bloodstone" (Live at Mid-South Coliseum, Memphis, Tennessee, 12 December 1982)	4:05
Total length:		58:11

Outtakes
No.	Title	Length
1.	"Thunder Road" (Bonus track on Point of Entry)	5:12
2.	"Fire Burns Below" (Bonus track on Stained Class)	6:58
3.	"My Design" (Remains unreleased)
Total length:		70:21

== Personnel ==
Judas Priest

- Rob Halford – vocals
- Glenn Tipton – guitars
- K. K. Downing – guitars
- Ian Hill – bass
- Dave Holland – drums, drum machine

Production

- Produced by Tom Allom
- "Johnny B. Goode" co-produced by Glenn Tipton, Rob Halford, and K. K. Downing
- Engineered by Henrik Nilsson
- Additional recording by Bill Dooley
- Equipment supervision by Tom Calcaterra
- Artwork by Mark Wilkinson

Lead Guitar Credits

- Ram It Down - lead Downing/Tipton/Downing/Tipton/both/Tipton
- Heavy Metal - intro - Tipton, lead Tipton
- Love Zone - lead Tipton/Downing/Tipton/Downing/both
- Come and Get It - intro Downing, lead Downing/Tipton
- Hard As Iron - lead Downing/both harmonizing/Tipton
- Blood Red Skies - lead Downing, end licks Tipton
- I'm a Rocker - lead Tipton
- Johnny B Goode - lead Downing/Tipton/Downing/both
- Love You to Death - licks and lead Downing
- Monsters of Rock - lead Downing

== Charts ==
Chart (1988)	Peak position
Australian Albums (ARIA)	43
Austrian Albums (Ö3 Austria)	14
Canada Top Albums/CDs (RPM)	30
Dutch Albums (Album Top 100)	25
Finnish Albums (The Official Finnish Charts)	3
German Albums (Offizielle Top 100)	9
Japanese Albums (Oricon)	34
Norwegian Albums (VG-lista)	5
Swedish Albums (Sverigetopplistan)	5
Swiss Albums (Schweizer Hitparade)	8
UK Albums (Official Charts)	24
US Billboard 200	31

== Certifications ==
Region	Certification	Certified units/sales
Canada (Music Canada)	Gold	50,000^{^}
United States (RIAA)	Gold	500,000^{^}
^{^} Shipments figures based on certification alone.
