= Evening Star (Judas Priest song) =

Song by Judas Priest

Single by Judas Priest

from the album Killing Machine
- B-side: "Beyond the Realms of Death (live)"
- Released: 27 April 1979
- Recorded: 1978
- Studio: Utopia, London; Basing Street, London; CBS, London
- Genre: Hard rock; heavy metal
- Length: 4:06
- Label: Columbia
- Songwriters: Rob Halford; Glenn Tipton
- Producers: James Guthrie; Judas Priest

Judas Priest singles chronology
"Take On the World" (1979)	"Evening Star" (1979)	"Living After Midnight" (1980)

"Evening Star" is a song by English heavy metal band Judas Priest, originally released on their 1978 album Killing Machine, and released as a single in April 1979. Following the success of the previous single "Take on the World", it again charted in the UK but it only reached No. 53.

== Personnel ==
- Rob Halford – vocals
- K. K. Downing – guitar
- Glenn Tipton – guitar
- Ian Hill – bass guitar
- Les Binks – drums

== Charts ==
Chart (1979)	Peak position
UK Singles (Official Charts)	53
