= Rock Forever =

1981 single by Judas Priest

Single by Judas Priest

from the album Unleashed in the East
- Released: 1981 (live version)
- Recorded: 1979
- Genre: Heavy metal
- Length: 3:16
- Label: Columbia
- Songwriter(s): Rob Halford; K. K. Downing; Glenn Tipton
- Producer(s): James Guthrie; Judas Priest

Judas Priest singles chronology
"The Green Manalishi (With the Two Prong Crown)" (1979)	"Rock Forever" (1981)	"Living After Midnight" (1980)

"Rock Forever" is a song by English heavy metal band Judas Priest, originally released on their 1978 album Killing Machine, and released as the B-side of "Before the Dawn" the same year (CBS 6794 (UK)).

The song contains a guitar duet by guitarists K. K. Downing and Glenn Tipton.

== 1979 bonus single release ==
The 7" bonus disc

A bonus (live) single was released in 1979 with the Japanese release of the LP Unleashed in the East. (CBS S JP 1)

The tracks were also included in the 2001 CD re-release of Unleashed in the East

=== 1979 track listing ===
Side A
No.	Title	Length
1.	"Rock Forever"	3:25
2.	"Hell Bent For Leather"	2:39

Side B
No.	Title	Length
1.	"Beyond the Realms of Death"	7:20

== 1981 12-inch Maxi single ==
With the catalogue number CBS A-12.1864, this single was released two years later in the Netherlands only in 1981.

== Personnel ==
- Rob Halford – vocals
- K. K. Downing – guitar
- Glenn Tipton – guitar
- Ian Hill – bass guitar
- Les Binks – drums
