= Baptizm of Fire =

Studio album by Glenn Tipton
- Released: February 17, 1997
- Recorded: 1994–1996
- Genres: Heavy metal, neoclassical metal
- Length: 62:09 (remastered version)
- Label: Atlantic
- Producers: Glenn Tipton, Mark Dodson

Glenn Tipton chronology
Baptizm of Fire (1997)	Edge of the World (2006)

Professional ratings
Review scores
Source	Rating
Allmusic	4/5 stars
Blabbermouth.net	6/10

Baptizm of Fire is the debut solo album by Judas Priest guitarist Glenn Tipton released in 1997. Atlantic released the album on February 17, 1997.

== Background ==
It was recorded and mixed at Devonshire and Ocean Studios, U.S.A. and Monnow Valley, Battery, Olympic, and The Gazebo Studio, UK. Writing and recording took place in the years 1994 to 1996, with management done by Bill Curbishley and Co-ordination done by Jayne Andrews.

Mostly due to conflicting time schedules with the end of production and subsequent promotion of the Judas Priest comeback with lead singer Tim "Ripper" Owens and the release of the album Jugulator in October 1997, Baptizm of Fire has not been presented on a live tour.

== Track listing ==
All tracks are written by Glenn Tipton, except where noted.

No.	Title	Length
1.	"Hard Core"	4:41
2.	"Paint It Black" (Mick Jagger, Keith Richards)	2:52
3.	"Enter the Storm"	5:56
4.	"Fuel Me Up"	3:02
5.	"Extinct"	5:33
6.	"Baptizm of Fire"	5:17
7.	"The Healer"	4:57
8.	"Cruise Control"	4:06
9.	"Kill or Be Killed"	3:22
10.	"Voodoo Brother"	5:33
11.	"Left for Dead"	3:40

Japanese/reissue edition bonus tracks
No.	Title	Length
12.	"Himalaya"	7:41
13.	"New Breed" (Tipton, Karina Tipton)	5:23

== Personnel ==
- Glenn Tipton – all guitars and vocals, bass on track 13
- Robert Trujillo – bass on tracks 1, 2, 10
- C.J. de Villar – bass on tracks 3, 4, 8, 9, 11
- Billy Sheehan – bass on tracks 5, 6
- John Entwistle – bass on track 7
- Neil Murray – bass on track 12
- Brooks Wackerman – drums on tracks 1, 2, 10
- Shannon Larkin – drums on tracks 3, 4, 8, 9, 11
- Cozy Powell – drums on tracks 5, 6, 7, 12
- Rick Tipton – drums on track 13
- Don Airey – keyboards on track 6
- Whitfield Crane – backing vocals on track 10

Production

- Produced and mixed by Glenn Tipton and Mark Dodson
- Engineered and mixed by Sean Lynch
- Mastered by Greg Calbi
- Original design by Larry Freemantle
- Cover illustration and reissue design by Mark Wilkinson
- Photography by Amy Guip and Ray Palmer
