= Edge of the World =

Studio album by Glenn Tipton / Tipton, Entwistle & Powell
- Released: March 7, 2006
- Recorded: 1994–1997
- Genre: Heavy metal; progressive rock; hard rock
- Length: 52:50
- Label: Rhino/WEA
- Producer: Glenn Tipton, Sean Lynch

Glenn Tipton / Tipton, Entwistle & Powell chronology
Baptizm of Fire (1997)	Edge of the World (2006)

Professional ratings
Review scores
Source	Rating
Allmusic	3/5 stars

Edge of the World is the only studio album by Tipton, Entwistle & Powell, released on 7 March 2006 by Rhino and WEA. The album was recorded in the mid-1990s, and consists of outtakes from Glenn Tipton's debut solo album Baptizm of Fire. Tipton was accompanied by The Who bassist John Entwistle and drummer Cozy Powell on these recordings. Both Entwistle and Powell died in the years between the album's recording and release, Powell in 1998 and Entwistle in 2002.

== Background ==
Consisting of tracks that were not released on Baptizm of Fire, Tipton released the album on March 7, 2006 in memory of Entwistle and Powell. "I'm sure everyone will know," Tipton stated, "this album is a tribute to their unique styles and skills and a small part of the immense legacy they have left behind which will continue to inspire people all over the world for many years to come." Glenn presented the tracks to Rhino/Warners Entertainment and they agreed that this album had to be released. This album was released March 7, 2006 and all proceeds from sales go to the Teenage Cancer Trust.

== Reception ==
Greg Prato of AllMusic called the album, "more melodic than the average Judas Priest release, and one that focuses mostly on Tipton's riffs and Powell's thunderous drumming rather than Entwistle's bass dexterity. Additionally, Tipton's vocals certainly won't be mistaken for Rob Halford's anytime soon, but they're certainly not cringe-worthy, either."

== Track listing ==
All tracks are written by Glenn Tipton except "Never Say Die" (Tipton, Entwistle).

No.	Title	Length
1.	"Unknown Soldier"	1:20
2.	"Friendly Fire"	5:31
3.	"The Holy Man"	5:00
4.	"Never Say Die" (melody and some lyrics taken from John Entwistle's song "Bridges Under the Water")	4:47
5.	"Resolution"	6:50
6.	"Searching"	4:40
7.	"Give Blood"	3:53
8.	"Crime of Passion"	5:17
9.	"Walls Cave In"	4:35
10.	"Edge of the World"	5:39
11.	"Stronger than the Drug"	5:18
Total length:		52:50

== Personnel ==
Tipton, Entwistle & Powell

- Glenn Tipton – guitars, vocals
- John Entwistle – bass
- Cozy Powell – drums

Additional musicians

- Don Airey – keyboards
- Neil Murray – additional bass on track 11

Production

- Produced and mixed by Glenn Tipton and Sean Lynch
- Artwork by Mark Wilkinson
