= Better by You, Better than Me =

1969 song by Spooky Tooth

Song by Spooky Tooth

from the album Spooky Two
- Released: March 1969
- Studio: Morgan Studios, London
- Genre: Hard rock; blues rock; progressive rock
- Length: 4:12
- Label: Island (UK); A&M (US)
- Songwriter: Gary Wright
- Producer: Jimmy Miller

Official audio
- "Better by You, Better than Me" on YouTube

"Better by You, Better than Me" is a 1969 song by the English rock band Spooky Tooth. The song appeared on the album Spooky Two and was composed by American keyboardist Gary Wright.

In 1990, a 1978 cover version by heavy metal band Judas Priest was the subject of a much-publicized "subliminal message trial". The lawsuit alleged that the band's recording contained hidden messages which were responsible for influencing a pair of young men in Sparks, Nevada, to make a suicide pact in 1985. The case was eventually dismissed.

== Spooky Tooth personnel ==
- Luther Grosvenor – guitar
- Mike Harrison – keyboards, vocals
- Mike Kellie – drums
- Greg Ridley – bass, guitar
- Gary Wright – keyboards, vocals

== Judas Priest version ==
"Better by You, Better than Me"

Single by Judas Priest

from the album Stained Class
- B-side: "Invader"
- Released: 27 January 1978
- Recorded: October–November 1977
- Genre: Heavy metal
- Length: 3:24
- Label: Columbia
- Songwriter: Gary Wright
- Producers: Judas Priest; James Guthrie

Judas Priest singles chronology
"Diamonds & Rust" (1977)	"Better by You, Better than Me" (1978)	"Before the Dawn" (1978)

Judas Priest's rendition of "Better by You, Better than Me" is faster than Spooky Tooth's and adds a short vocal bridge. The song was a last-minute addition to the album when CBS Records insisted on including another more commercial track to liven up an album on which a majority of the songs have a very dark and sinister undertone. It was recorded in a separate session with James Guthrie, as Dennis MacKay had moved on to other projects and was no longer available. The band was reportedly impressed with Guthrie's production, as it stood in contrast to the overly thin, flat sound that had plagued their albums up to this point; they would ask him to produce their next album, Killing Machine.

=== Personnel ===
- Rob Halford – lead vocals
- K. K. Downing – guitars
- Glenn Tipton – guitars, backing vocals
- Ian Hill – bass guitar
- Les Binks – drums

=== 1990 trial ===
In the middle of 1990, Judas Priest were involved in a civil action that alleged they were responsible for the 1985 suicide attempts of 20-year-old James Vance and 18-year-old Ray Belknap in Reno, Nevada, US. On 23 December 1985, Vance and Belknap became intoxicated before going to a playground at a Lutheran church in Reno. Belknap placed a 12-gauge shotgun under his own chin and proceeded to fire the weapon, dying instantly. Vance followed, but survived the self-inflicted gunshot wound with a severely disfigured face. He died three years later.

Vance's parents and their legal team, headed by Nevada attorney Ken McKenna, subsequently alleged that a subliminal message of "do it" had been included in the song. They alleged the command in the song triggered the suicide attempt. The three-week trial was watched closely by the music industry and constitutional lawyers. In a pre-trial motion, the judge ruled that subliminal messages were incapable of being protected speech under the First Amendment to the United States Constitution, since they were by definition not noticeable and thus could not form part of a dialogue. Timothy Moore, who testified on Judas Priest's behalf, stated that the plaintiffs (led by McKenna) achieved "a major victory in getting the case to trial in the first place". The case was dismissed, with the finding that any subliminal messages within the recording, should they actually exist, were not responsible for the suicides. The lawsuit cost the band approximately $250,000 in legal costs and the judge ordered CBS to pay $40,000 to the plaintiff's attorneys to reimburse them for costs related to bringing the lawsuit, since the label did not comply with discovery orders and provide master tapes of Stained Class to Vance's lawyers.

One of the defense witnesses, Dr Timothy E. Moore, later chronicled the trial in an article for Skeptical Inquirer magazine. The trial was also the subject of a 1991 documentary entitled Dream Deceivers: The Story Behind James Vance vs. Judas Priest. In the documentary, Judas Priest vocalist Rob Halford commented that if the band were so inclined to insert subliminal commands into their music, messages commanding their fans to kill themselves would be quite counterproductive; from the band's perspective it would be much more practical to insert the command "buy more of our records". Regarding the plaintiffs' assertions that the statement "do it" was a command to commit suicide, Halford pointed out that the phrase "do it" had no direct message to do anything in particular. Neuroscientist and record producer Daniel J. Levitin testified in deposition that as a practical matter, "it is extremely difficult to mix a high-quality multitrack record for a major label in which the important instrumental parts can all be heard, without trying to spend countless hours burying subliminal messages in the mix."

Comedian Bill Hicks referred to the case in his stand-up routines, asking "What performer wants his audience dead?" He performed a sketch mimicking Judas Priest being sick of their wealth, power, and fame and coming up with the subliminal message as a solution to their problems. Comedian Denis Leary also commented on the trial on his album No Cure for Cancer, saying heavy metal bands should put more subliminal messages in their records: "Kill the band, kill your parents, then yourself". Chuck Schuldiner, of the band Death, wrote the song "Lack of Comprehension" (from the album Human) about the incident.

== See also ==
- "Suicide Solution"
- Murder of Elyse Pahler
