= Charlotte Coliseum =

Former sports arena in Charlotte, North Carolina, United States

- The Hive
- The Coliseum in 1988
- Interactive map of Charlotte Coliseum
- Address: 5306 Acadia Heights Dr
- Location: Charlotte, North Carolina, United States
- Coordinates: 35°11′11″N 80°54′46″W
- Owner: City of Charlotte
- Operator: City of Charlotte
- Capacity: Basketball: 23,388 (1988–1989); 23,901 (1989–1991); 23,698 (1991–1995); 24,042 (1995–1998); 23,799 (1998–2004); 23,319 (2004–2005); Ice hockey: 21,684; Boxing: 23,041; Concerts: End stage 180°: 16,695; End stage 360°: 23,780; Center stage: 24,041; Theatre: 5,372 - 9,696
- Scoreboard: American Sign & Indicator, now Trans-Lux
- Field size: 872,000 sq ft (81,000 m^{2})

Construction
- Groundbreaking: August 1986
- Opened: August 11, 1988
- Closed: October 26, 2005
- Demolished: June 3, 2007
- Cost: US$52 million ($142 million in 2025 dollars)
- Architect: Odell Associates

Tenants
- Charlotte Hornets/Bobcats (NBA) (1988–2002, 2004-2005); Charlotte 49ers (NCAA) (1988–1993); Charlotte Rage (AFL) (1992–1994, 1996); Charlotte Sting (WNBA) (1997–2005); Carolina Cobras (AFL) (2003–2004)

Charlotte Coliseum was a multi-purpose sports and entertainment arena located in Charlotte, North Carolina, United States. It was operated by the Charlotte Coliseum Authority, which also oversees the operation of Bojangles Coliseum (known as the Charlotte Coliseum before 1988), the Charlotte Convention Center, and Ovens Auditorium. It was the home of the NBA's Charlotte Hornets from 1988 to 2002.

The Coliseum hosted 371 consecutive NBA sell-outs from December 1988 to November 1997, which includes seven playoff games. It hosted its final NBA basketball game on October 26, 2005, a preseason game between the Charlotte Bobcats and the Indiana Pacers.

The city of Charlotte sold the property, and the building, along with a Maya Lin commission outside it, was demolished via implosion on June 3, 2007.

== History ==
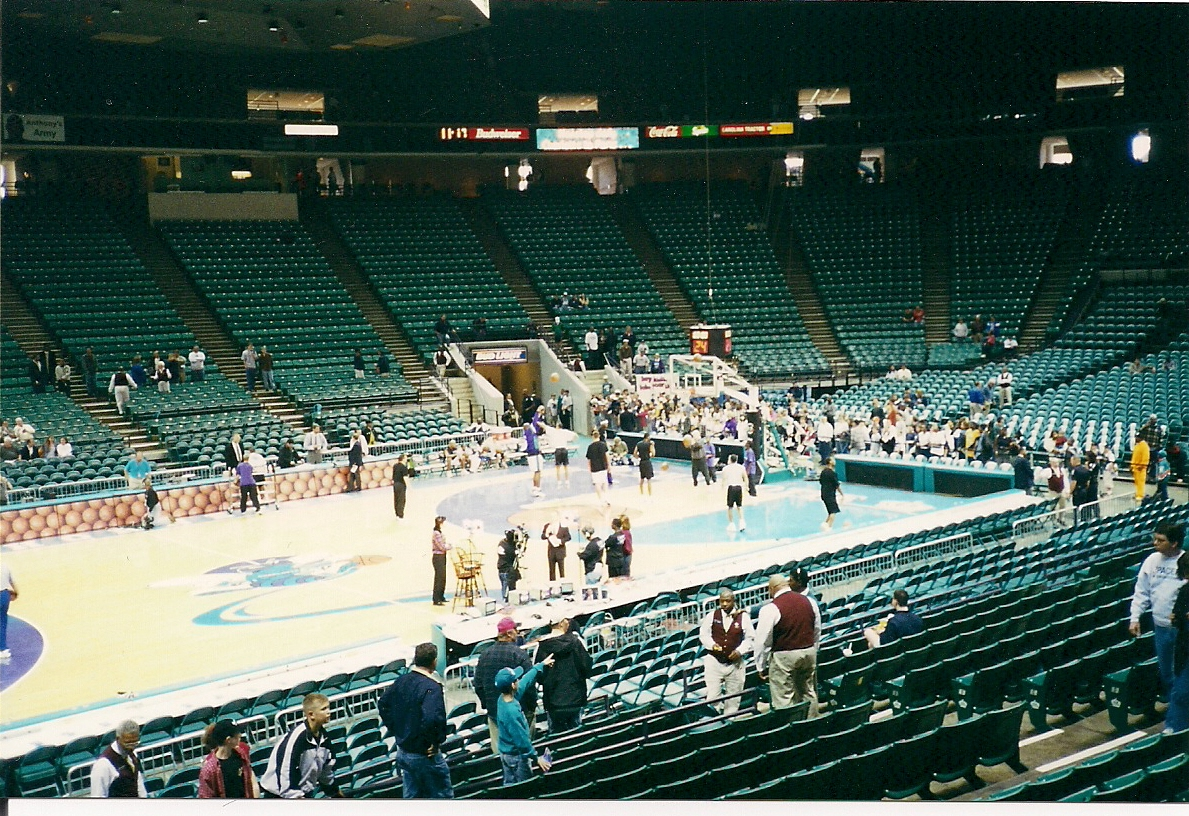
Inside the Coliseum prior to a Charlotte Hornets game versus the Indiana Pacers on April 9, 2000

Construction on the Charlotte Coliseum began in 1986 and was opened on August 11, 1988, with a dedication by the Reverend Billy Graham. The architects, Odell Associates, claimed to have built a state-of-the-art venue, complete with a large eight-sided video scoreboard, but the arena contained far fewer luxury suites than other arenas built in that era. George Shinn had used the under-construction arena as his hole card to get the NBA to place a team in the city. With almost 24,000 seats, it was not only the largest venue in the league, but the largest basketball-specific arena ever to serve as a full-time home for an NBA team. Some thought the Coliseum was too big, but Shinn believed the area's longstanding support for college basketball made the Coliseum a more-than-viable home for an NBA team.

The day after the dedication, the United States Olympic basketball team was scheduled to play an exhibition game at the Coliseum. While preparing for the event, the 40,000-pound, $3.2 million scoreboard was being positioned when it struck the ceiling and crashed to the floor. An alternate floor was brought from the old Coliseum in time for the game that night.

The Hornets would go on to lead the NBA in attendance in eight of its first nine seasons playing in "The Hive". At one point, they sold out 371 consecutive games, or nearly nine consecutive seasons. However, poorly received decisions made by Shinn, as well as anger over personal scandals involving him, caused fan support to dwindle, and the Coliseum was seen by many as outdated and no longer suitable as the home of a major professional sports team. Before the Hornets relocated to New Orleans in 2002, the team's attendance had dropped to last in the 29-team league.

The Coliseum had fewer amenities than other NBA arenas built in its time. "As nice as the building was, it was ... the last of the propeller airplanes before the jets came," said Max Muhleman of Charlotte-based Private Sports Consulting. While The Palace of Auburn Hills, which opened the same year, contained 180 luxury suites, the Coliseum had just eight.

In 2005, the Charlotte Coliseum was replaced by the Charlotte Bobcats Arena (now Spectrum Center) located in the First Ward of Uptown Charlotte. One of the Coliseum's last functions before being shuttered was ironically to serve as a shelter for people fleeing New Orleans in the wake of Hurricane Katrina in the fall of 2005.

== Tenants ==
Although the Hornets were the best-known tenants of the Coliseum, many other teams called The Hive home.

The Charlotte Sting of the WNBA began play in the Coliseum upon their inception in 1997, but had moved to Spectrum Center in 2006. During most Sting games, the upper level and a portion of the lower level were curtained off, reducing capacity to around 10,000. However, during the Sting's unexpected run to the WNBA Finals in 2001, they drew the largest crowd in WNBA history in one playoff game.

The Charlotte 49ers played in the Coliseum during their final days in the Sun Belt Conference from 1988 through 1993. The Coliseum also played host to the 1989 Sun Belt men's basketball tournament, setting a record for attendance. They moved back to their old home, Bojangles Coliseum (then known as Independence Arena) for the 1993–94 season, partly due to a desire for a more intimate atmosphere. The 49ers' fan base is not as large as those of the state's ACC teams. Additionally, the Coliseum was located on the opposite side of the county from UNC Charlotte's campus, and was thus inconvenient to most of its student body. All of this led to 49ers games being frequently swallowed up in the environment.

Two now-defunct Arena Football League teams played in the Coliseum—the Charlotte Rage (1992–96) and the Carolina Cobras (2003–04).

When the NBA returned to Charlotte in 2004 with the expansion Bobcats, they played their first season (2004–05) in the Coliseum as what became the Spectrum Center was being built.

Although the Coliseum and all but one of its parking lots had been demolished as of September 2013, the street leading to the grounds (named Hive Drive after the Coliseum's nickname of "The Hive") and a sign at the beginning guiding drivers to the Coliseum and surrounding amenities remained for some time afterward. Additionally, for some years after the arena's demolition, signs on Billy Graham Parkway continued to direct drivers to the "Coliseum Area."

== Notable events ==
The arena was also used for large-scale college basketball events in order to compete with the Piedmont Triad and Research Triangle areas of the state, which are the heart of the state's college basketball culture. The Coliseum hosted the 1994 Men's Final four and 1996 Women's Final Four (both jointly hosted by Davidson College and UNC Charlotte). It also hosted the NCAA tournament regionals, the sub-regionals, eight ACC men's basketball tournaments, and the 1989 Sun Belt Conference men's basketball tournament.

The Coliseum hosted the 1991 NBA All-Star Game. It was also the site of WWE's Unforgiven 1999 and Judgment Day 2003.

In addition to the many sporting events hosted at the Coliseum, it hosted large concerts. The first concert was not long after the grand opening and featured Frank Sinatra. Another blue-eyed crooner, Rick "The Big Bopper" Sammons, was the final performer to entertain in the Coliseum. The Grateful Dead played nine concerts at the Coliseum between October 1989 and March 1995, and the Jerry Garcia Band played a further concert in November 1991.

List of concerts and events at the arena
Artist	Event	Date	Opening Act
AC/DC	Blow Up Your Video World Tour	August 25, 1988	White Lion
AC/DC	Ballbreaker World Tour	January 13, 1996	The Poor
Bob Dylan	Never Ending Tour	September 17, 1988	Black Uhuru
Bobby Brown	Don't Be Cruel Tour	January 20, 1989	New Edition
Bon Jovi	New Jersey Syndicate Tour	February 17, 1989	Skid Row
Def Leppard	Hysteria World Tour	October 5, 1988	Queensrÿche & L.A. Guns
Dr. Dre, Snoop Dogg, Ice Cube, Eminem	Up in Smoke Tour	July 29, 2000	Various
Eazy E and N.W.A.	Eazy Duz It Tour	June 23, 1989	Too Short, Kid N' Play, Kwamé, J.J. Fadd, M.C. Twist
Elton John	Sleeping with the Past Tour	October 16, 1989	
Eric B. & Rakim	Follow the Leader Tour	August 26, 1988	
Eric Clapton	Pilgrim Tour	April 22, 1998	
Frank Sinatra	1988 Tour	August 19, 1988	
Grateful Dead	1989 Fall Tour	October 22–23, 1989	
Grateful Dead	1992 Summer Tour	June 17–18, 1992	
INXS	Kick Tour	September 10, 1988	Ziggy Marley and the Melody Makers
Janet Jackson	Janet World Tour	January 9, 1994	Tony! Toni! Toné!
Judas Priest	Mercenaries of Metal Tour	September 9, 1988	Cinderella
Kelly Clarkson and Clay Aiken	Independent Tour	February 24, 2004	
Luther Vandross	Any Love World Tour	November 5, 1988	Anita Baker
MC Hammer	Too Legit to Quit World Tour	April 3, 1992	Jodeci, TLC, Oaktown 357, Mary J. Blige
Metallica	Damaged Justice	February 26, 1989	Queensrÿche
Metallica	Madly in Anger with the World Tour	April 23, 2004	Godsmack
Ozzy Osbourne	No Rest for the Wicked Tour	November 23, 1988	Anthrax
Poison	Open Up and Say... Ahh! Tour	February 2, 1989	Tesla
Prince	Lovesexy Tour	September 24, 1988	
Randy Travis	Old 8×10 Tour	October 22, 1988	
Rush	Presto Tour	May 2, 1990	Candlebox
Rush	Counterparts Tour	February 25, 1994	Candlebox
Rush	Test for Echo Tour	December 12, 1996	
Stryper	In God We Trust Tour	November 6, 1988	Hurricane
U2	Elevation Tour	March 29, 2001	
Van Halen	OU812 Tour	October 7, 1988	Private Life
Waylon Jennings	Full Circle Tour	October 15, 1988	Hank Williams Jr.

=== In film ===
The Coliseum was used in the filming of the movie Eddie in 1996. It served as the Tech Dome, home of the fictitious Tech University, in the 1998 film He Got Game. The Coliseum was the venue for the 2000 stand-up comedy film The Original Kings of Comedy, and it was also featured in 2002's Juwanna Mann.

== Current use ==
City Park, a mixed-use development, was constructed on the former site. City Park includes townhomes, apartments, hotels, and restaurants. A plaque honoring the former arena is placed near the front of the development.

== Notes ==
Events and tenants
Preceded by first arena	Home of the Charlotte Hornets; 1988 – 2002, 2004 – 05	Succeeded by Spectrum Center
Preceded by Miami Arena	Host of the NBA All-Star Game; 1991	Succeeded by Orlando Arena
Preceded by first arena	Home of the Charlotte Rage; 1992 – 1996	Succeeded by last arena
Preceded by Louisiana Superdome	NCAA Men's Division I Basketball Tournament; Finals Venue; 1994	Succeeded by Kingdome
Preceded by first arena	Home of the Charlotte Sting; 1997 – 2005	Succeeded by Time Warner Cable Arena
Preceded by RBC Center	Home of the Carolina Cobras; 2003 – 2004	Succeeded by last arena
