= Redeemer of Souls Tour =

2014–15 concert tour by Judas Priest

- Tour by Judas Priest
- Location: North America; Australia; Asia; South America; Europe
- Start date: 1 October 2014
- End date: 17 December 2015
- No. of shows: 129; 64 in North America; 45 in Europe; 7 in South America; 7 in Oceania; 6 in Asia

Judas Priest concert chronology
- Epitaph World Tour (2011–2012); Redeemer of Souls Tour (2014–2015); Firepower World Tour (2018–2019)

The Redeemer of Souls Tour was a worldwide concert tour by English heavy metal band, Judas Priest, which was in support of Redeemer of Souls. It was their first tour since the conclusion of the Epitaph World Tour in 2012, which was originally dubbed as a farewell tour; the band has since retracted that statement.

The 2016 live album, Battle Cry, was released on 25 March of that year, featuring the band's performance recorded at Wacken Open Air on 1 August 2015.

== Support ==
For the first American leg, Judas Priest choose glam rock band, Steel Panther, to play with them. Their guitar player, Russ Parrish, had previously worked with Rob Halford in the 1990s in the band Fight.

Other bands that supported Judas Priest include:

1. Motörhead (5 May 2015 in Santiago, Chile)
2. Def Leppard (2 June 2015 in Oslo, Norway)
3. Five Finger Death Punch (8 dates in Europe – France, Finland, Luxembourg, Germany, Poland and Czech Republic)
4. Accept (22 April 2015 in Rio de Janeiro, Brazil)
5. DragonForce (2 dates in Australia at February 2015)
6. Michael Schenker's Temple of Rock (6 dates in the United Kingdom, between November and December 2015)
7. Saxon (4 dates in US in May 2015)
8. Mastodon (12 dates in the US and Canada between October and November 2015)
9. UFO (10 dates on the European Leg between 4 and 17 December 2015)
10. Texas Hippie Coalition (14 May 2015 in Cedar Park, Texas, USA)
11. Thin Lizzy (6 November 2014 in Allen, Texas, USA)
12. Texas Hippie Coalition (13 July 2015 in Grand Prairie, Texas, USA)

== Setlists ==
The tour featured material from Redeemer of Souls for the first time. It also coincided with the 30th anniversary of the release of Defenders of the Faith and so the band played a number of songs from that album that hadn't been played since the mid-1980s.

2014 setlist
(1 October 2014 – 22 February 2015)
1. "Dragonaut"
2. "Metal Gods"
3. "Devils Child"
4. "Victim of Changes"
5. "Halls of Valhalla"
6. "Love Bites"
7. "March of the Damned"
8. "Turbo Lover"
9. "Redeemer of Souls"
10. "Beyond the Realms of Death"
11. "Jawbreaker"
12. "Breaking the Law"
13. "Hell Bent for Leather"
  Encore 1
14. "You've Got Another Thing Comin"
  Encore 2
15. "Living After Midnight"
16. "Defenders of the Faith"
2015 setlist #1
(28 February 2015 – 25 June 2015)
1. "Dragonaut"
2. "Metal Gods"
3. "Devils Child"
4. "Victim of Changes"
5. "Halls of Valhalla"
6. "Love Bites"
7. "March of the Damned"
8. "Turbo Lover"
9. "Redeemer of Souls"
10. "Beyond the Realms of Death"
11. "Jawbreaker"
12. "Breaking the Law"
13. "Hell Bent for Leather"
  Encore 1
14. "The Hellion / Electric Eye"
15. "You've Got Another Thing Comin"
  Encore 2
16. "Painkiller"
17. "Living After Midnight"

2015 setlist #2
(26 June 2015 – 1 August 2015)
1. "Dragonaut"
2. "Metal Gods"
3. "Devils Child"
4. "Victim of Changes"
5. "Halls of Valhalla"
6. "Love Bites"
7. "Redeemer of Souls"
8. "Beyond the Realms of Death"
9. "Jawbreaker"
10. "Breaking the Law"
11. "Hell Bent for Leather"
  Encore 1
12. "The Hellion / Electric Eye"
13. "You've Got Another Thing Comin"
  Encore 2
14. "Painkiller"
15. "Living After Midnight"

2015 setlist #3
(16 October 2015 – 17 December 2015)
1. "Dragonaut"
2. "Metal Gods"
3. "Desert Plains"
4. "Victim of Changes"
5. "Halls of Valhalla"
6. "The Rage"
7. "Turbo Lover"
8. "Redeemer of Souls"
9. "Beyond the Realms of Death"
10. "Screaming for Vengeance"
11. "Breaking the Law"
12. "Hell Bent for Leather"
  Encore 1
13. "The Hellion / Electric Eye"
14. "You've Got Another Thing Comin"
  Encore 2
15. "Painkiller"
16. "Living After Midnight"

26 February 2015: "The Hellion/Electric Eye" and "Painkiller" were added for the further legs of the tour. Shortly they removed "Defender of the Faith" from the set. 26 June 2015: "Love Bites" and "March of the Damned" was removed from the set. 16 October 2015: "Desert Plains", "The Rage" and "Screaming for Vengeance" (not played since 1986) were added, "Devil's Child" and "Jawbreaker" were removed from the set.

== Tour dates ==
Date	City	Country	Venue
First leg
1 October 2014	Rochester	United States	Main Street Armory
3 October 2014	Hammond	United States	The Venue at Horseshoe Casino
4 October 2014	Louisville	United States	Louder Than Life Festival
6 October 2014	Montreal	Canada	Bell Centre
7 October 2014	Orillia	Canada	Casino Rama
9 October 2014	Brooklyn	United States	Barclays Center
10 October 2014	Atlantic City	United States	Harrah's Atlantic City
11 October 2014	Mashantucket	United States	Grand Theater at Foxwoods Casino
14 October 2014	Lowell	United States	Tsongas Center
15 October 2014	Allentown	United States	PPL Center
17 October 2014	East Rutherford	United States	Izod Center
18 October 2014	Pittsburgh	United States	Petersen Events Center
19 October 2014	Detroit	United States	Fox Theatre
21 October 2014	Kansas City	United States	Arvest Bank Theatre at The Midland
22 October 2014	Evansville	United States	Ford Center
24 October 2014	Baltimore	United States	Pier Six Pavilion
25 October 2014	Portsmouth	United States	nTelos Wireless Pavilion
26 October 2014	Simpsonville	United States	Charter Amphitheatre at Heritage Park
28 October 2014	Duluth	United States	Arena at Gwinnett Center
29 October 2014	Orlando	United States	Hard Rock Live
30 October 2014	Hollywood	United States	Hard Rock Live
2 November 2014	Corpus Christi	United States	Concrete Street Amphitheater
4 November 2014	Laredo	United States	Laredo Energy Arena
6 November 2014	Allen	United States	Allen Event Center
7 November 2014	Austin	United States	Fun Fun Fun Fest
8 November 2014	El Paso	United States	Don Haskins Center
10 November 2014	Los Angeles	United States	Nokia Theatre L.A. Live
12 November 2014	Glendale	United States	Jobing.com Arena
13 November 2014	Highland	United States	San Manuel Indian Bingo & Casino
14 November 2014	Las Vegas	United States	Pearl Concert Theater
16 November 2014	San Jose	United States	City National Civic
18 November 2014	West Valley City	United States	Maverik Center
19 November 2014	Broomfield	United States	1stBank Center
21 November 2014	Boise	United States	CenturyLink Arena
22 November 2014	Tacoma	United States	Tacoma Dome
Second leg
21 February 2015	Melbourne	Australia	Soundwave Festival
22 February 2015	Adelaide	Australia	Soundwave Festival
24 February 2015	Sydney	Australia	Enmore Theatre
26 February 2015	Brisbane	Australia	Eatons Hill
28 February 2015	Brisbane	Australia	Soundwave Festival
1 March 2015	Sydney	Australia	Soundwave Festival
3 March 2015	Auckland	New Zealand	West Fest
6 March 2015	Tokyo	Japan	Ex Theater
7 March 2015	Osaka	Japan	Orix Theater
9 March 2015	Nagoya	Japan	Assembly Hall
11 March 2015	Tokyo	Japan	Nippon Budokan
13 March 2015	Sapporo	Japan	Zepp Sapporo
16 March 2015	Seoul	South Korea	AX Hall
Third leg
23 April 2015	Rio de Janeiro	Brazil	Vivo Rio
25 April 2015	São Paulo	Brazil	Monsters of Rock
26 April 2015	São Paulo	Brazil	Monsters of Rock
28 April 2015	Curitiba	Brazil	Monsters of Rock
30 April 2015	Porto Alegre	Brazil	Monsters of Rock
2 May 2015	Buenos Aires	Argentina	Monsters of Rock
5 May 2015	Santiago	Chile	Movistar Arena
8 May 2015	Mexico City	Mexico	Palace of Sports
9 May 2015	Guadalajara	Mexico	Force Metal Fest
11 May 2015	Monterrey	Mexico	Auditorio Banamex
14 May 2015	Cedar Park	United States	Cedar Park Center
16 May 2015	Columbus	United States	Rock on the Range
17 May 2015	Cincinnati	United States	Horseshoe Cincinnati
19 May 2015	St. Charles	United States	Family Arena
20 May 2015	Council Bluffs	United States	Harrah's Casino
21 May 2015	Rosemont	United States	Rosemont Theatre
Fourth leg
30 May 2015	Munich	Germany	Rockavaria Festival
31 May 2015	Gelsenkirchen	Germany	Rock im Revier Festival
2 June 2015	Oslo	Norway	Oslo Spektrum
4 June 2015	Helsinki	Finland	Helsinki Ice Hall
6 June 2015	Sölvesborg	Sweden	Sweden Rock Festival
8 June 2015	Hamburg	Germany	Alsterdorfer Sporthalle
9 June 2015	Berlin	Germany	Treptow Arena
12 June 2015	Donington Park	England	Download Festival
14 June 2015	Utrecht	Netherlands	TivoliVredenburg
16 June 2015	Esch-sur-Alzette	Luxembourg	Rockhal
17 June 2015	Paris	France	Zénith de Paris
19 June 2015	Clisson	France	Hellfest
20 June 2015	Dessel	Belgium	Graspop Metal Meeting
21 June 2015	Hinwil	Switzerland	Rock The Ring Festival
23 June 2015	Milan	Italy	Forum di Assago
25 June 2015	Ostrava	Czech Republic	ČEZ Aréna
26 June 2015	Prague	Czech Republic	O_{2} Arena
27 June 2015	Łódź	Poland	Atlas Arena
29 June 2015	Belgrade	Serbia	Belgrade Calling Festival
30 June 2015	Sofia	Bulgaria	Arena Armeec
1 July 2015	Bucharest	Romania	Romexpo
4 July 2015	Athens	Greece	Rockwave Festival
11 July 2015	Biloxi	United States	Hard Rock Biloxi Hotel & Casino
13 July 2015	Grand Prairie	United States	Verizon Theatre at Grand Prairie
15 July 2015	Sterling Heights	United States	Freedom Hill Amphitheatre
16 July 2015	Oshkosh	United States	RockUSA Festival
18 July 2015	Cadott	United States	Rock Fest
25 July 2015	Barcelona	Spain	Rock Fest
26 July 2015	Madrid	Spain	Auditorio Miguel Ríos De Rivas
29 July 2015	Székesfehérvár	Hungary	Fezen Festival
30 July 2015	Graz	Austria	Seerock Festival
1 August 2015	Wacken	Germany	Wacken Open Air
Fifth leg
16 October 2015	Paso Robles	United States	Vina Robles Amphitheater
17 October 2015	Las Vegas	United States	Pearl Concert Theater
20 October 2015	San Francisco	United States	The Warfield Theater
23 October 2015	Fresno	United States	William Saroyan Theater
24 October 2015	San Bernardino	United States	San Manuel Amphitheater
27 October 2015	Vancouver	Canada	Hard Rock Casino
28 October 2015	Vancouver	Canada	Hard Rock Casino
31 October 2015	Regina	Canada	Brandt Center
1 November 2015	Winnipeg	Canada	MTS Center
3 November 2015	Peoria	United States	Peoria Civic Center
5 November 2015	Huntington	United States	Paramount Theater
6 November 2015	Huntington	United States	Paramount Theater
7 November 2015	Newark	United States	Prudential Center
10 November 2015	Halifax	Canada	Scotiabank Centre
12 November 2015	Toronto	Canada	Air Canada Centre
17 November 2015	Tilburg	Netherlands	013
18 November 2015	Frankfurt	Germany	Jahrhunderthalle
20 November 2015	Geneva	Switzerland	SEG Geneva Arena
23 November 2015	Bradford	England	St George's Hall
24 November 2015	Glasgow	Scotland	Barrowland Ballroom
26 November 2015	Wolverhampton	England	Wolverhampton Civic Hall
28 November 2015	Manchester	England	O2 Apollo Manchester
30 November 2015	Portsmouth	England	Guildhall
1 December 2015	London	England	Brixton Academy
4 December 2015	Karlstad	Sweden	Lofbergs Arena
5 December 2015	Stockholm	Sweden	Ericsson Globe
7 December 2015	Tallinn	Estonia	Saku Arena
8 December 2015	Vilnius	Lithuania	Siemens Arena
10 December 2015	Gdańsk	Poland	Ergo Arena
12 December 2015	Brno	Czech Republic	Rondo Arena
14 December 2015	Stuttgart	Germany	Schleyerhalle
16 December 2015	Brussels	Belgium	Vorst Nationaal
17 December 2015	Oberhausen	Germany	König-Pilsener-Arena

== Box office score data ==
Venue	City	Tickets sold / available	Gross revenue
Bell Centre	Montreal	2,556 / 3,080 (83%)	$154,141
Barclays Center	Brooklyn	4,258 / 5,708 (75%)	$321,231
Pier Six Pavilion	Baltimore	4,138 / 4,140 (99%)	$256,320
Arena at Gwinnett Center	Duluth	3,014 / 5,244 (57%)	$148,074
Hard Rock Live	Orlando	2,024 / 2,886 (70%)	$113,911
Laredo Energy Arena	Laredo	1,577 / 5,290 (30%)	$78,281
NOKIA Theatre	Los Angeles	6,255 / 6,255 (100%)	$385,953
City National Civic	San Jose	3,067 / 3,305 (93%)	$185,160
Maverik Center	West Valley City	2,667 / 4,807 (55%)	$138,148
Vivo Rio	Rio de Janeiro	1,768 / 4,000 (44%)	$93,270
Movistar Arena	Santiago	11,886 / 12,000 (99%)	$492,727
Palacio de los Deportes	Mexico City	10,541 / 13,056 (81%)	$404,524
Auditorio Banamex	Monterrey	3,812 / 4,222 (90%)	$130,048
Horseshoe Casino	Cincinnati	2,940 / 4,056 (72%)	$117,450
Harrah's Stir Concert Cove	Council Bluffs	2,461 / 4,000 (61%)	$106,100
Vina Robles Amphitheatre	Paso Robles	1,483 / 3,018 (49%)	$82,030
Paramount Theater	Huntington	3,160 / 3,160 (100%)	$299,689
Vorst Nationaal	Brussels	2,309 / 3,000 (77%)	$126,247
William Saroyan Theatre	Fresno	1,478 / 2,339 (63%)	$113,740
