= Rodahal =

Coordinates: 50.8683°N 6.0619°E

Rodahal is a 4,500-capacity event and concert venue located in Kerkrade, Netherlands. It opened in 1966 and was designed by Dutch architect Laurens Bisscheroux. Rodahal has hosted concerts by many famous bands and artists over the years, including Roger Whittaker Alice Cooper, Status Quo, Fats Domino, Rainbow, Judas Priest, Dire Straits, Santana, Iron Maiden and Bob Dylan.
