= Stained Class =

Studio album by Judas Priest
- Released: 10 February 1978
- Recorded: October–November 1977
- Studios: Chipping Norton, Oxfordshire and Utopia, London
- Genre: Heavy metal
- Length: 43:40
- Label: Columbia
- Producers: Dennis Mackay, Judas Priest, James Guthrie

Judas Priest chronology
Sin After Sin (1977)	Stained Class (1978)	Killing Machine (1978)

Singles from Stained Class
- 1. "Better by You Better than Me" Released: 27 January 1978; 2. "Exciter" Released: 19 May 1978 (Japan)

Stained Class is the fourth studio album by English heavy metal band Judas Priest, released on 10 February 1978 by Columbia Records. It is the first of three Judas Priest albums recorded with drummer Les Binks, as well as the first to feature the band's now well-known logo in the artwork. Musically, Stained Class is considered the album on which the band honed many of the elements of their hard-edged signature sound, dispensing with most of the progressive and blues rock overtones and softer ballads of previous efforts.

The album features a cover version of "Better by You Better than Me" by Spooky Tooth, which became the subject of an infamous civil suit in 1990 which alleged the song subliminally influenced two teenaged boys to make a suicide pact. Other notable tracks include "Exciter", considered an early precursor to speed metal and thrash metal, and “Beyond the Realms of Death”, which is considered one of the band's greatest songs by many fans and frequently included in the band's live setlists.

Upon release, Stained Class was a modest commercial success, reaching number 27 on the UK Albums Chart and becoming the band's first LP to enter the US Billboard 200; it was eventually certified gold in the latter country. Retrospectively, it is regarded by some as one of the most important and influential albums in the development of heavy metal and one of Judas Priest's best records, as well as one of the greatest heavy metal albums of all time.

== Recording ==
Stained Class is the only Judas Priest album to feature songwriting by all five members of the band. Newly added drummer Les Binks earned a songwriting credit for "Beyond the Realms of Death", and bassist Ian Hill received his first songwriting credit since their debut album, Rocka Rolla, co-writing "Invader" with vocalist Rob Halford and lead guitarist Glenn Tipton.

Dennis MacKay was brought in by CBS Records to produce the album. His resume at the time consisted mainly of jazz fusion artists and more progressive rock artists such as David Bowie and Supertramp. The recording sessions for Stained Class took place in October and November 1977 at Chipping Norton Recording Studios in Oxfordshire.

"Better by You Better than Me" was a last-minute addition to the album when CBS Records insisted on including something with commercial potential to liven up an album they felt had a very dark and sinister tone. The song was recorded with producer James Guthrie separately from the rest of the album, as MacKay had moved on to other projects and was no longer available. The band was reportedly so impressed with Guthrie's production on "Better by You Better than Me" that they asked him to produce their next album, Killing Machine.

== Musical Style ==
Stained Class, while retaining elements of the slower Heavy Metal style the band played on their first two albums, represented a shift in the band's style. The opening track "Exciter" is regarded as an important early influence on Thrash Metal, while the album as a whole is regarded as a significant influence on the New Wave of British Heavy Metal.

== Cover Art ==
Artist Rosław Szaybo's cover artwork introduced the now-classic Judas Priest logo, replacing the Gothic Script logo which appeared on the band's previous two albums.

== Release ==
Stained Class as released on February 10, 1978. The album peaked at No. 27, slightly lower than their previous album, Sin After Sin, while also being the first Judas Priest album to crack the Billboard 200 chart and was eventually certified gold in the US.

== Critical reception ==
Professional ratings
Review scores
Source	Rating
AllMusic	4.5/5 stars
The Encyclopedia of Popular Music	3/5 stars
The Rolling Stone Album Guide	5/5 stars

Steve Huey of AllMusic described Stained Class as "Judas Priest's greatest achievement", commenting, "This is the point where Priest put it all together, embracing their identity as the heaviest band on the planet and taking the genre to new heights of power, speed, musicality, and malevolence." In 2005, Stained Class was ranked number 307 in Rock Hard magazine's book of The 500 Greatest Rock & Metal Albums of All Time. In 2017, it was ranked 43rd in Rolling Stone's "100 Greatest Metal Albums of All Time".

After the success of subsequent Judas Priest albums in the US, Stained Class would eventually be certified Gold.

Thomas Gabriel Fischer, founder of the pioneering extreme metal bands Celtic Frost and Hellhammer, would cite the album as a formative influence on him, saying, "It presented a surgical, precise kind of metal, a prototype of thrash metal that I had never heard. This was the first Judas Priest album I ever bought, and it is one of the most important albums in my life. But when I got this album in 1978, I actually had to get used to it, because it was so modern for my ears, you know?"

The song "Invader" was finally added to the band's setlists in 2021, making "Heroes End" the only song off the album that has never been performed live.

== Lawsuit ==
Twelve years after its release, Stained Class was the subject of a 1990 civil action brought against the band by the family of a teenager, James Vance, who entered into a suicide pact with his friend Ray Belknap after allegedly listening to "Better by You Better than Me" on 23 December 1985. Belknap succeeded in killing himself, and Vance was left critically injured after surviving a self-inflicted gunshot to the face, eventually dying of a methadone overdose three years later. The suit alleged that Judas Priest recorded subliminal messages on the song that said "do it". The suit was eventually dismissed. The song was originally written and performed by the band Spooky Tooth.

Three weeks after the lawsuit wrapped up, the band kicked off their Painkiller Tour by playing "Better by You Better than Me" on the first concert in Burbank, California on 13 September. It is Judas Priest's only live performance of the song since 1979.

"Beyond the Realms of Death" was mentioned in the trial in which the parents of the teens alleged that subliminal messages encouraging suicide had been hidden in that song as well. In a telephone interview with The New York Times at the time, Halford confirmed that the song carries an anti-suicidal message, discussing how people suffering from depression withdraw from society and refuse to communicate.

Comedian Bill Hicks ridiculed the lawsuit as part of his act, pointing out (as many others have also done) the absurdity of the notion that a successful band would wish to kill off their purchasing fanbase. Comic Denis Leary (who was later accused of plagiarizing Hicks' material) also referenced the case in his 1993 stand-up special No Cure For Cancer.

== Track listing ==
Side one
No.	Title	Writer(s)	Length
1.	"Exciter"	Rob Halford, Glenn Tipton	5:34
2.	"White Heat, Red Hot"	Tipton	4:20
3.	"Better by You Better than Me" (Spooky Tooth cover)	Gary Wright	3:24
4.	"Stained Class"	Halford, Tipton	5:19
5.	"Invader"	Halford, Tipton, Ian Hill	4:12

Side two
No.	Title	Writer(s)	Length
6.	"Saints in Hell"	Halford, K. K. Downing, Tipton	5:30
7.	"Savage"	Halford, Downing	3:27
8.	"Beyond the Realms of Death"	Halford, Les Binks	6:53
9.	"Heroes End"	Tipton	5:01
Total length:			43:40

2001 bonus tracks
No.	Title	Writer(s)	Length
10.	"Fire Burns Below" (Recorded during the 1988 Ram It Down sessions)	Halford, Tipton	6:58
11.	"Better by You Better Than Me" (Live at Foundations Forum, Los Angeles, California; 13 September 1990)	Wright	3:40
Total length:			54:18

== Personnel ==
Judas Priest

- Rob Halford – vocals
- K. K. Downing – guitars
- Glenn Tipton – guitars, backing vocals
- Ian Hill – bass guitar
- Les Binks – drums

Additional personnel

- Dave Holland – drums (Track 10, 1988)
- Scott Travis – drums (Track 11, 1990)

Production

- Produced by Dennis MacKay and Judas Priest, and engineered by Neil Ross, except "Better By You Better Than Me", produced by James Guthrie and Judas Priest, and engineered by Ken Thomas and Paul Northfield
- Mixed by Neil Ross, Ken Thomas and Paul Northfield
- Art design by Rosław Szaybo
- Photography by Ronald Kass

== Charts ==
Chart (1978)	Peak position
Japanese Albums (Oricon)	49
UK Albums (Official Charts)	27
US Billboard 200	173

== Certifications ==
Region	Certification	Certified units/sales
United States (RIAA)	Gold	500,000^{^}
^{^} Shipments figures based on certification alone.
