= Exciter (song) =

- Japanese release picture sleeve

Single by Judas Priest

from the album Stained Class
- B-side: "Dissident Aggressor"
- Released: 19 May 1978 (Japan)
- Recorded: October–November 1977, Chipping Norton Recording Studios, Oxfordshire
- Genre: Heavy metal; speed metal
- Length: 5:34
- Label: CBS/Sony (Japan)
- Songwriters: Rob Halford; Glenn Tipton
- Producers: Dennis MacKay; Judas Priest

"Exciter" is a song by English heavy metal band Judas Priest from their 1978 album Stained Class. It is the opening track and is an early example of speed metal. According to former guitarist K.K. Downing their drummer Les Binks accidentally came up with the drum intro for the song at a soundcheck on their Sin After Sin tour.

Canadian heavy metal band Exciter took its name from this song.

== 1990 trial ==
During the 1990 civil action brought against the band, "Exciter" was played backwards to the court. Lead vocalist Rob Halford demonstrated that, when played in reverse, the song appeared to contain the phrase: "I asked for a peppermint, I asked for her to get one." This action showed that by playing any song in reverse, phrases could be formed by the human brain. The same point applied to "Better by You, Better than Me", which had a sound that could be interpreted as "do it".

== Track listing ==
In Japan, the song was released as a single in 1978.

Side A
No.	Title	Length
1.	"Exciter"	5:34

Side B
No.	Title	Length
2.	"Dissident Aggressor"	3:08
