= Take On the World (Judas Priest song) =

Single by Judas Priest

from the album Killing Machine
- B-side: "Starbreaker (live)"
- Released: 5 January 1979 (UK)
- Recorded: 1978
- Studio: Utopia, London; Basing Street, London; CBS, London
- Genre: Heavy metal
- Length: 3:02
- Label: Columbia
- Songwriters: Rob Halford; Glenn Tipton
- Producers: James Guthrie; Judas Priest

Judas Priest singles chronology
"Before the Dawn" (1978)	"Take On the World" (1979)	"Evening Star" (1979)

"Take On the World" is a song by English heavy metal band Judas Priest, originally released on their 1978 album Killing Machine, and released as a single in January 1979. It was the first Judas Priest single to chart in the UK top 40, reaching number 14. The song was Judas Priest's attempt at producing a stadium anthem in the style of Queen's 1977 single "We Will Rock You". As a single it sold around 400,000 copies.

According to former Judas Priest guitarist K.K. Downing, the song was used by Wolverhampton Wanderers football club as their club song.

"Take On the World" was covered by new wave band The Human League on their 1980 tour.

== Personnel ==
- Rob Halford – vocals
- Glenn Tipton – lead guitar
- K. K. Downing – rhythm guitar
- Ian Hill – bass
- Les Binks – drums

== Charts ==
Chart (1979)	Peak position
Ireland (IRMA)	11
UK Singles (Official Charts)	14
