= Beyond the Realms of Death =

1978 song by Judas Priest

Song by Judas Priest

from the album Stained Class
- Released: 10 February 1978
- Recorded: October–November 1977
- Studio: Chipping Norton Recording, Oxfordshire, England
- Genre: Heavy metal
- Length: 6:53
- Label: Columbia
- Songwriters: Rob Halford; Les Binks
- Producers: Dennis Mackay; Judas Priest

"Beyond the Realms of Death" is a power ballad by English heavy metal band Judas Priest from their 1978 album Stained Class. The song is considered a Judas Priest classic by fans and critics, with further recordings included in Priest, Live and Rare, '98 Live Meltdown, Live in London, A Touch of Evil: Live, Live Insurrection and a number of compilation albums. Drummer Les Binks has his only songwriting credit with the band for the music of this song.

== Composition ==
The song is written in B-minor, employing a verse-chorus structure, interspersed with a solo following the first and second chorus by Glenn Tipton and K. K. Downing respectively. The verses use an acoustic riff, while the choruses and outro are more typical of the band's heavy metal sound.

The lyrics depict a man waiting for death as he suffers from catatonia or depression. The manner of his death is unclear.

The song was mentioned in a 1990 trial in which the parents of two teens who had committed suicide after listening to Stained Class alleged that subliminal messages encouraging suicide had been hidden in another song on the album. In a telephone interview with The New York Times at the time, Halford confirmed that the song carries an anti-suicidal message, discussing how people suffering from depression withdraw from society and refuse to communicate.

== Covers ==
- Blind Guardian covered the song on the tribute album A Tribute to Judas Priest: Legends of Metal Vol. II. The cover also appeared on the 2007 remaster of their compilation album The Forgotten Tales.

== Personnel ==
- Rob Halford – vocals
- K. K. Downing – guitars (second solo)
- Glenn Tipton – guitars (first solo)
- Ian Hill – bass
- Les Binks – drums
