= Priest, Live and Rare =

Priest, Live & Rare

Live album by Judas Priest
- Released: 22 April 1998
- Genre: Heavy metal

Professional ratings
Review scores
Source	Rating
AllMusic	3/5 stars

Priest, Live & Rare is a live album by heavy metal band Judas Priest, released in 1998.

Judas Priest issued several singles that would include non-album B-sides with many of the singles, to entice fans who already had the A-side on their full-length to purchase the single. This Japanese-only CD compilation of live and rare cuts is lifted from assorted 7- and 12-inch singles. There is also an official Austrian CD version of the album, released by Epic Records with the number 493008-2 and same track listing and artwork.

== Track listing ==
1. "Beyond the Realms of Death" (Live in Cleveland 1978) 7:04
2. "White Heat, Red Hot" (Live in Cleveland 1978) 4:32
3. "Starbreaker" (Live in Cleveland 1978) 7:19
4. "Breaking the Law" (Live in Holland 1981) 2:35
5. "Living After Midnight" (Live in Holland 1981) 4:19
6. "The Green Manalishi" (Live in US Festival 1983) 5:01
7. "Breaking the Law" (Live in US Festival 1983) 2:44
8. "You've Got Another Thing Comin'" (Live in US Festival 1983) 7:34
9. "Private Property" (Live at Kiel Auditorium, St. Louis 1986) 5:10
10. "Turbo Lover" (Hi-Octane Mix) 7:21
- Tracks 3 and 7 are also available on Metalogy.
