= Killing Machine =

Studio album by Judas Priest
- Released: 3 November 1978
- Recorded: August 1978
- Studios: Utopia (London); CBS (London)
- Genre: Heavy metal
- Length: 38:29
- Label: CBS/Columbia
- Producers: Judas Priest; James Guthrie

Judas Priest chronology
| Stained Class (1978) | Killing Machine (1978) | Unleashed in the East (1979) |

Alternative US cover
- The album's title was renamed Hell Bent for Leather in the US due to 'murderous implications' concerns of the original title.

Singles from Killing Machine
- 1. "Before the Dawn" Released: 27 October 1978; 2. "Take On the World" Released: 5 January 1979; 3. "Evening Star" Released: 27 April 1979; 4. "The Green Manalishi" Released: May 1979 (US)

Killing Machine (alternatively titled Hell Bent for Leather) is the fifth studio album by English heavy metal band Judas Priest, released in November 1978, by CBS Records internationally, and received a United States release on 28 February 1979, by Columbia Records. The album pushed the band towards a more commercial style while still featuring the dark lyrical themes of their previous albums. At about the same time, the band members adopted their now-famous "leather-and-studs" fashion image, inspired by Rob Halford's interest in leather culture. It is the band's last studio album to feature drummer Les Binks.

== International and American versions ==
The album was retitled Hell Bent for Leather for its US release on 28 February 1979. Singer Rob Halford simply said that their US-label found Killing Machine too much of a heavy statement to use, and suggested the alternative title to the band. It was feared that the ‘murderous implications’ of the original title would be too much for the larger record retailers to want to put the LP on its racks. Both album titles are drawn from the titles of songs on the album with "The Green Manalishi (With the Two Prong Crown)", an early Fleetwood Mac cover, being added to the US release. The album was also pressed in red vinyl in the UK.

== Overview ==
With Killing Machine, Judas Priest began moving to a more accessible, commercial format that abandoned the complex, fantasy-themed songs of their previous three albums. While this album still had dark undertones, it was more grounded in realism. This was reflected in their change of stage costumes from flowing Gothic robes to leather, but was also a reaction to the rising punk and new wave movements. K. K. Downing had expressed doubts about the new wave of British heavy metal stating "everybody was totally dedicated to having their own show, their own images". Priest were part of the influence on the NWOBHM, but not part of it. The band's new, simpler sound was the result of several factors, amongst them being a desire to compete with the energy and speed of punk rock, the need to produce songs that were easier to perform live, and the wish to appeal more to American audiences. Tracks such as "Burnin' Up" and "Evil Fantasies" are replete with S&M themes while "Running Wild" is about late-night partying and "Before the Dawn" a depressing ballad. "Hell Bent for Leather" reflected their newly adopted leather costumes as well as Rob Halford's soon-to-be-trademark entrances on stage riding a Harley-Davidson motorcycle.

The single "Take On the World" was an attempt at producing a stadium shoutalong tune in the mould of Queen's "We Will Rock You", and was also covered by new wave band The Human League on their 1980 tour. The song's influence endures: in 2021, the band Spoon released the single "Wild", which samples its drum patterns from "Take On the World". The record was released as a 7-inch single and was backed with a remix by Dennis Bovell which features the same drum pattern.

"Hell Bent For Leather" and a cover version of the Fleetwood Mac song "The Green Manalishi" were the two songs from Killing Machine which became standard parts of the band's live setlist. Regarding the song "The Green Manalishi", there has always been much conjecture about the meaning of the title and the lyrical content -- the writer of the song Peter Green has stated that the lyrics are about money, represented by the devil. Green elaborated that he composed the song after experiencing a drug-influenced dream in which he received a visitation from a green dog, which bayed at him from the afterlife. He understood that the dog represented money.

Describing the impact of the "Killing Machine" cover version of "The Green Manalishi", journalist Adrien Begrand states that the group "succeeded in such a way that the Priest version is now far more famous than the original. They make it their own, accelerating the pace just enough to achieve a better balance of force and menace, and the groove created by drummer Les Binks cinches it. Priest’s towering version is nevertheless an all-time heavy metal classic."

The other songs on the "Killing Machine" album are performed rarely live ("Evil Fantasies", "Running Wild", "Rock Forever and "Take On the World") or not at all. "Running Wild" and "Delivering The Goods" became regulars on the Firepower tour setlists in 2018 after not being played since 1980, and the title track returned to the band's setlists at a show in Paris in January 2019 after being absent for 40 years.

The lyrics on the album were simplified somewhat in comparison with the band's previous albums, adapted into a more mainstream arena rock format, but the instrumentation retains the band's characteristic aggressiveness with heavier guitar riffing and elements of blues influence returning on some songs. The album is certified gold by the RIAA.

== Reissues ==
The album was remastered in 2001, with two bonus tracks added (three in the UK). The bonus track "Fight for Your Life" was the "original" version of Judas Priest's "Rock Hard Ride Free" from their Defenders of the Faith album. "The Green Manalishi (With the Two-Pronged Crown)" is considered a bonus track on the UK remaster, but a regular track on the U.S. version.

In 2010, audiophile label Audio Fidelity released a limited-edition 24-karat gold CD of Hell Bent for Leather. Mastering was done by Steve Hoffman. This does not contain the bonus tracks from the 2001 edition.

== Recording and production ==
This is the first Judas Priest album where Glenn Tipton incorporated the guitar technique of tapping into his soloing style, which had been popularized by Eddie Van Halen earlier that year with the release of Van Halen's popular debut album (which incidentally was released the same day as Stained Class). This can be heard in the solos of "Hell Bent for Leather" and "Killing Machine".

This is also the final studio album for drummer Les Binks who had joined the band in early 1977 in time for the Sin After Sin tour; he is credited with helping develop the traditional Priest percussive sound. Binks was dropped and replaced by drummer Dave Holland after the 1979 tour because of a financial disagreement where the band's manager Mike Dolan wanted Binks to "waive his fees" for performing on the platinum-selling 1979 live album Unleashed in the East.

== Critical reception ==
Professional ratings
Review scores
| Source | Rating |
|---|---|
| AllMusic | 4.5/5 stars |
| Encyclopedia of Popular Music | 2/5 stars |

In 2005, Killing Machine was ranked number 321 in Rock Hard magazine's book The 500 Greatest Rock & Metal Albums of All Time. This album, as well as subsequent albums by the band, has somewhat divided fans, with some preferring the complexity and darkness of the early albums, while others prefer the more mainstream and polished later albums.

== In popular culture ==
The song "Hell Bent for Leather" is featured in Ari Gold's 2008 film Adventures of Power, the 2004 episode of the sitcom That '70s Show entitled "Surprise, Surprise" and also featured in 2009 game Guitar Hero: Metallica.

== Track listing ==
Side one
| No. | Title | Writer(s) | Length |
|---|---|---|---|
| 1. | "Delivering the Goods" | Rob Halford, K. K. Downing, Glenn Tipton | 4:16 |
| 2. | "Rock Forever" | Halford, Downing, Tipton | 3:19 |
| 3. | "Evening Star" | Halford, Tipton | 4:06 |
| 4. | "Hell Bent for Leather" | Tipton | 2:41 |
| 5. | "Take On the World" | Halford, Tipton | 3:00 |

Side two
| No. | Title | Writer(s) | Length |
|---|---|---|---|
| 6. | "Burnin'Up" | Downing, Tipton | 4:07 |
| 7. | "The Green Manalishi (With the Two-Pronged Crown)" (Fleetwood Mac cover; originally exclusive to Hell Bent for Leather, also added to later releases of Killing Machine) | Peter Green | 3:23 |
| 8. | "Killing Machine" | Tipton | 3:01 |
| 9. | "Running Wild" | Tipton | 2:58 |
| 10. | "Before the Dawn" | Halford, Downing, Tipton | 3:23 |
| 11. | "Evil Fantasies" | Halford, Downing, Tipton | 4:15 |
| Total length: | | | 38:29 |

2001 bonus tracks
| No. | Title | Writer(s) | Length |
|---|---|---|---|
| 12. | "Fight for Your Life" (Recorded during the 1982 Screaming for Vengeance sessions) | Downing, Halford, Tipton | 4:06 |
| 13. | "Riding on the Wind" (Live at the US Festival, Devore, California; 29 May 1983) | Downing, Halford, Tipton | 3:16 |
| Total length: | | | 45:51 |

== Personnel ==
Judas Priest

- Rob Halford – vocals
- K. K. Downing – guitars
- Glenn Tipton – guitars, keyboards on "Evening Star", "Burning Up", "Killing Machine" and "Before the Dawn",
- Ian Hill – bass guitar
- Les Binks – drums (all tracks except "Before the Dawn")

Additional musicians

- Dave Holland – drums (bonus tracks 12 and 13)

Production

- Produced by James Guthrie and Judas Priest
- Engineered by James Guthrie, assisted by Damian Korner, Andrew Jackson, Kevin Dallimore, and Andrew Clark
- Cover design by Rosław Szaybo
- Photography by Bob Elsdale

== Charts ==
| Chart (1978–79) | Peak position |
|---|---|
| Japanese Albums (Oricon) | 62 |
| UK Albums (Official Charts) | 32 |
| US Billboard 200 | 128 |

== Certifications ==
| Region | Certification | Certified units/sales |
|---|---|---|
| Canada (Music Canada) | Platinum | 100,000^{^} |
| United Kingdom (BPI) | Silver | 60,000^{^} |
| United States (RIAA) | Gold | 500,000^{^} |
^{^} Shipments figures based on certification alone.

== Release history ==
Release formats for Killing Machine/Hell Bent for Leather
| Region | Date | Label | Format | Catalogue |
|---|---|---|---|---|
| United Kingdom | 3 November 1978 | CBS | LP; cassette | CBS 83135 |
| Japan | November 1978 | Epic | LP; cassette | 25-3P-28 |
| United States; Canada | 28 February 1979 | Columbia | LP; cassette | JC 35706 |
| United States; Canada | July 1986 | Columbia | CD | CK 35706 |
| Europe | 22 October – 12 November 2001 | Columbia | CD | CK 86181 |
| Japan | 23 October 2001 | Epic | CD | EICP 7011 |
| United States | 6 November 2001 | Columbia; Legacy | CD | CK 86181 |
