= Glenn Tipton =

English guitarist (born 1947)

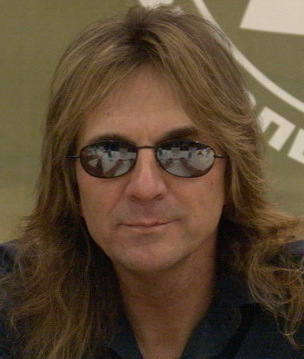
- Glenn Tipton in 2005

Background information
- Born: Glenn Raymond Tipton; 25 October 1947 (age 78); Blackheath, England
- Genre: Heavy metal
- Occupations: Musician; songwriter
- Instruments: Guitar; vocals
- Years active: 1967–present
- Member of: Judas Priest
- Formerly of: The Flying Hat Band
- Website: glenntipton.com

Glenn Raymond Tipton (born 25 October 1947) is an English guitarist. Often noted for his complex playing style and classically influenced solos, he is best known as one of the lead guitarists for the heavy metal band Judas Priest. Tipton is the band's longest-serving member that is still active and, alongside bassist Ian Hill, the only member of the band to appear on every studio album.

== Early life ==
Tipton was born on 25 October 1947, in Blackheath, Staffordshire, to Olive and Doug Tipton. He attended Olive Hill Primary School when he was about five years old. His brother, Gary, was a guitar player for a local band called the Atlantics. Early on, Tipton was taught to play the piano by his mother.

Tipton learned to play guitar at age 19 with his first guitar being a Hofner acoustic guitar in 1966. He would then play a Rickenbacker until he was able to afford a Fender Stratocaster. This guitar would become his main live guitar until it was stolen after a show in Newcastle. Tipton soon bought a black Stratocaster and, later, a Gibson SG Special afterwards with money he received to replace his stolen guitar. He can be seen playing both of these guitars during Judas Priest's appearance on The Old Grey Whistle Test in 1975.

== Career ==
Tipton's first band was Merlin (1967–1969), which became Shave 'Em Dry (1969–1971), with future Starfighters and Ozzy Osbourne drummer Barry Scrannage, later becoming the Flying Hat Band in 1971. This band soon broke up due to management issues. In May 1974, Tipton joined Judas Priest, and coincidentally Scrannage had joined the band Bullion with earlier Judas Priest members Ernest Chataway and Bruno Staphenhill. This was during the recording for Rocka Rolla, so Tipton quickly added his guitar parts to the album. He frequently played keyboards on the early albums, although those were no longer featured on any songs after Killing Machine.

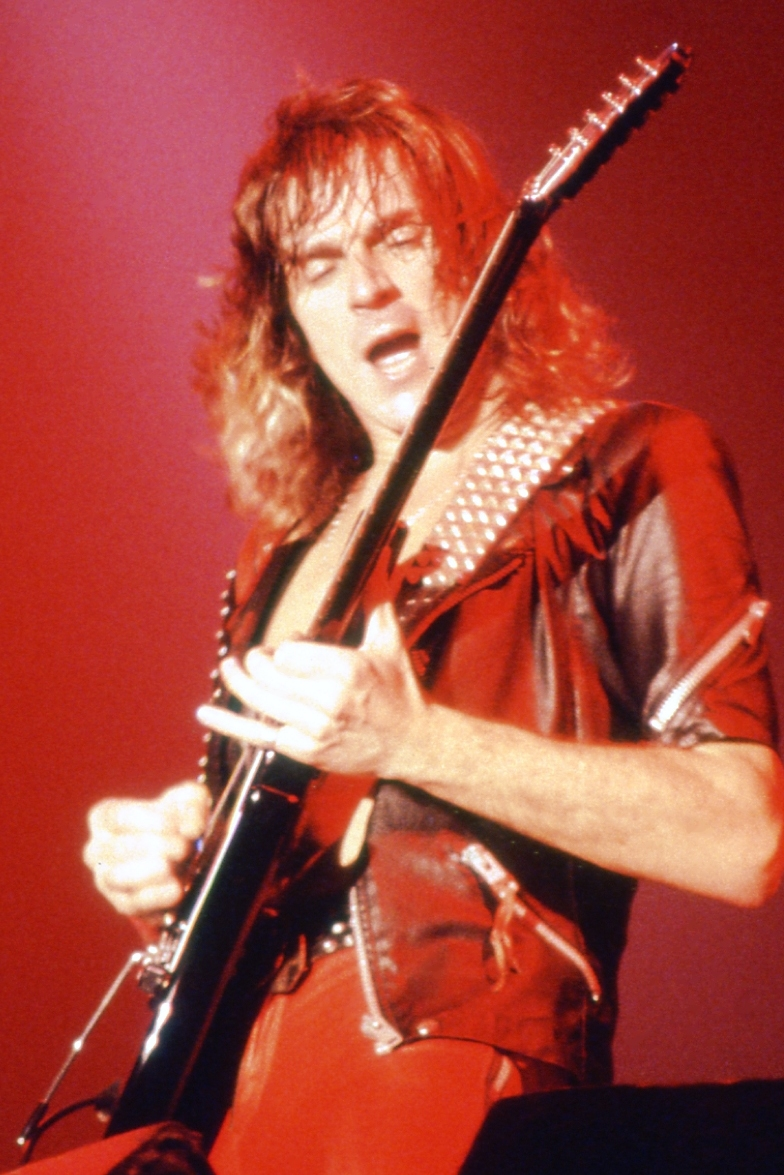
Tipton in 1984

1980's British Steel was Judas Priest's commercial breakthrough. This album combined the band's trademark heavy metal sound with pop-style song structures and hooks. "United" and "Breaking the Law" were some of Judas Priest's first guitar-driven songs not to include any solo sections. Judas Priest quickly shot to rock superstar status during the 1980s with their albums Point of Entry, Screaming for Vengeance, Defenders of the Faith, Turbo and Ram It Down, entering the 1990s with the album Painkiller.

Rob Halford left Judas Priest in 1992 and the band went on hiatus. During their split, Tipton wrote material for a solo project he formed in the mid-1990s. His first solo effort was the album Baptizm of Fire, which was released in 1997, followed by Edge of the World in 2006, which was a project from the sessions for Baptizm of Fire released under the name Tipton, Entwistle and Powell in tribute to John Entwistle and Cozy Powell who contributed to the initial sessions. In 1996, Judas Priest reformed with new vocalist Tim "Ripper" Owens. This new version of the band recorded the albums Jugulator in 1997 and Demolition in 2001. Both of these albums experimented with new sounds that distinguished them from the records with Halford. In 2003, Judas Priest reunited with Rob Halford and toured in celebration of his return in 2004. The band released Angel of Retribution in 2005 and Nostradamus in 2008. In 2010, Judas Priest announced their Epitaph World Tour, which was to be the last major world tour, which was also their first tour without original guitarist K. K. Downing, and the first to feature his replacement, Richie Faulkner. The band later retracted this announcement, and released their seventeenth album Redeemer of Souls in July 2014, as well as supporting the album with a world tour.

On 12 February 2018, Tipton announced that he would step down from touring when he revealed that he had been diagnosed with Parkinson's disease. He stated that he was still a member of the band despite his diagnosis and would not rule out future on-stage appearances. Producer and guitarist Andy Sneap replaced him on tour. On 9 March 2018, the eighteenth album Firepower was released. At the 20 March 2018 show in Newark, New Jersey, Tipton joined the band on stage to perform "Metal Gods", "Breaking the Law" and "Living After Midnight", then "Victim of Changes" and "No Surrender" on later dates. Prior to the band's performance, he expressed uncertainty regarding his future role in Judas Priest, "It's an unanswerable question, really. It's in the lap of the metal gods." After performing on stage with the band, he described it as "emotional", and being overwhelmed with support from the band members and from fans worldwide, "You don’t like to see a grown man cry, but we did." Tipton did not make any more appearances on the remaining dates of the band's world tour due to his illness, as explained by bassist Ian Hill.

== Personal life and illness ==
Tipton lives in the village of Romsley, Worcestershire, in the West Midlands near Birmingham, England, and has a state-of-the-art recording studio built next to his home. During the 1980s he also bought a property in Spain. He has two children, Karina and Rick, both of whom played on his solo album Baptizm of Fire.

On 12 February 2018, Tipton revealed that he had been diagnosed with Parkinson's disease, with which he was first diagnosed in 2008, thus ceasing his duties to perform on tour as the disease's progression left him unable to play the more challenging material. Rob Halford said that Tipton rejected the idea of having to be assisted with an additional guitarist backstage on tour for cover on some of his guitar parts or to use backing tracks. He then said that he witnessed first-hand the struggles Tipton experienced during the making of Firepower. Halford later said that Tipton made his decision five days prior to his public announcement, adding that Tipton would be "with us in spirit – every show, every song" on tour, and being overwhelmed by positive support and responses from fans. Bassist Ian Hill explained that Tipton faced a similar situation during rehearsals for the Redeemer of Souls Tour in 2014. At the time of the announcement, he said that Tipton made the decision to step off the stage due to his health, which caused emotional heartache for the band. Tipton said that he was shocked to hear the news of his diagnosis and "made me even more determined to fight. I could still play, so I just continued recording and touring." He would later say that he was "sort of shocked", describing it as "a pretty cruel disease."

In June 2018, Judas Priest launched the Glenn Tipton Parkinson's Foundation in Tipton's honour, in which they would sell specially designed t-shirts featuring Tipton playing guitar on the front and with the slogan "No Surrender" on the back with the Judas Priest cross on it. Tipton explains that the foundation would help raise money in hopes of finding a cure for Parkinson's disease. He also says that a new "pioneering treatment" from his personal specialist would also help treat other sufferers of the disease. Hill said that the band had known for some time that Tipton was diagnosed with Parkinson's disease before his announcement, again recalling the difficulties during the first days of the Redeemer of Souls Tour, but improved as time progressed. He says that Tipton's "as good as anyone can be given the situation. Glenn is out with us most of the time, anyway. And when he's feeling well enough he'll get on stage, and I can't promise anything, but he'll get up and do the encores with us."

Tipton's daughter, Karina Greenin, took part in an annual marathon in Barcelona to help raise funds for her father's foundation, which exceeded her £3,500 goal. Richie Faulkner recalled that Tipton was diagnosed during the Redeemer of Souls Tour, "maybe, actually, a bit before. So, after the 'Epitaph' tour, but before the 'Redeemer Of Souls' tour he got diagnosed, and they told him that he had it for quite a few years before that, but he didn't know. He kept it quiet, which is his business… He chose to go and check it out and they told him that it was the onset Parkinson's, and he told us. But he was able to do the 'Redeemer Of Souls' tour." He then said that the set had to be slightly changed in order to accommodate him. The band did not perform a few songs on the first part of the tour, but upon their appearance in Australia, they began to perform them due to Tipton's resurgence in his health and managed to successfully perform the entire tour, but stepped down during rehearsals for the Firepower World Tour due to the disease's progression which caused emotional heartbreak for the band. Tipton expressed his heartfelt gratitude to the fans for their support for him, "particularly over the past year which has been a tough one for me.....thank you all so much! No surrender!!"

Faulkner provided an update on Tipton in July 2020, saying that he was still in good spirits, but was "going a bit nuts" due to the lockdown caused by the COVID-19 pandemic.

Former Judas Priest guitarist K.K. Downing and drummer Les Binks joined the band on stage for the first time in over a decade to perform alongside Tipton during their induction into the Rock and Roll Hall of Fame in November 2022.

Tipton joined Judas Priest in the Power Trip show on October 7 2023. Judas Priest played an encore with "Hell Bent for Leather," then Halford welcomed Tipton to the stage for the final three songs of the set - "Metal Gods," "Breaking The Law" and "Living After Midnight."

== Influences ==
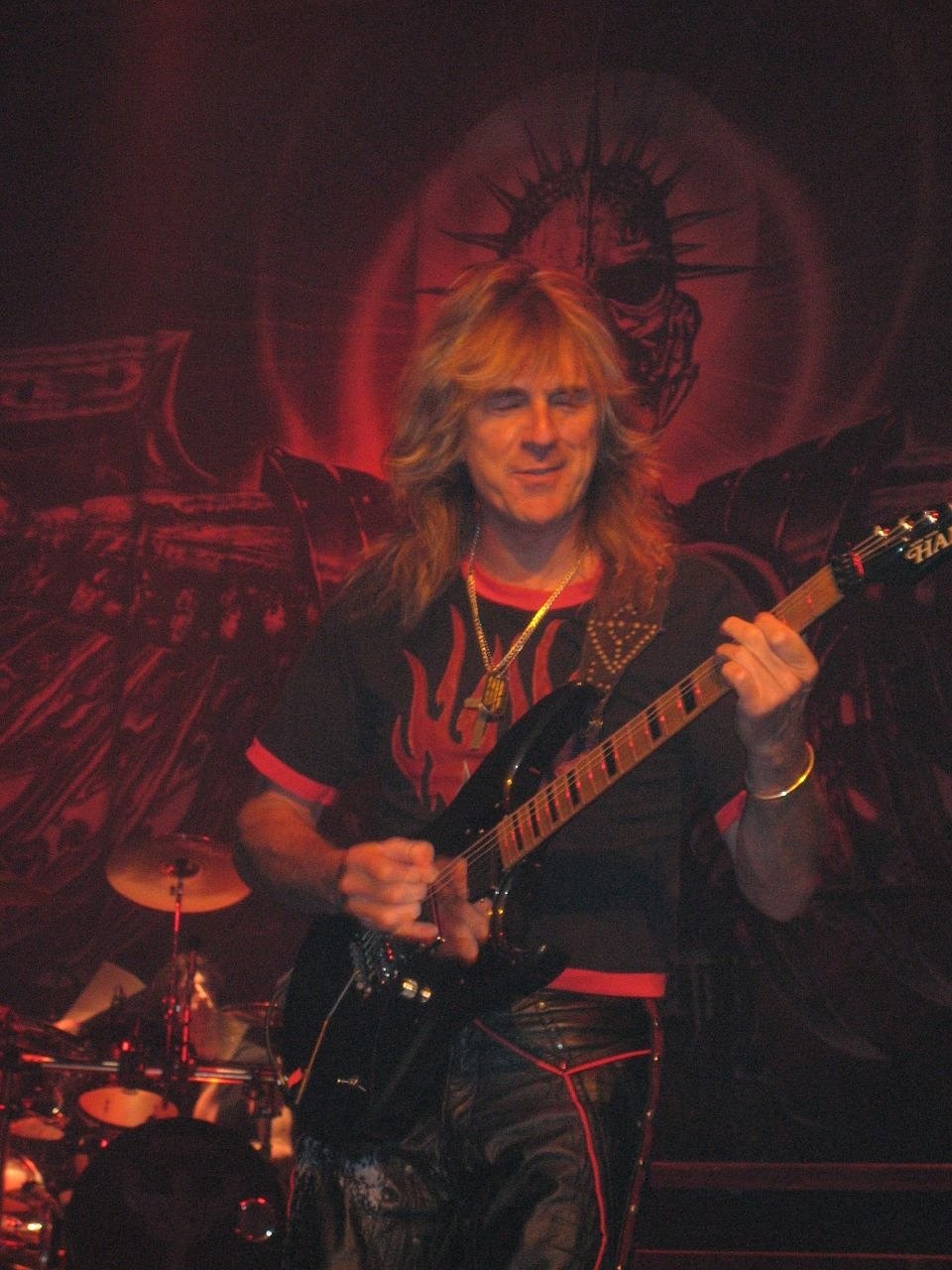
Tipton performing in 2005

Tipton has named the Spencer Davis Group, Jimi Hendrix, Deep Purple, Led Zeppelin, early Fleetwood Mac with Peter Green and Jeremy Spencer, Rory Gallagher, the Rolling Stones, and the Beatles as significant influences.

Tipton is a big fan of soundtrack music, something that is evident in listening to Judas Priest's metal opera Nostradamus. "I love people like Hans Zimmer," Tipton told Attention Deficit Delirium. "Some of the stuff that they do is incredible." (He is a big fan of the Gladiator soundtrack.) "One day when I'm good enough to, I wouldn't even call it a film score, but do music for film, I'd like that opportunity. It would be really exciting for me to do. Whether that will happen or not, I'm not sure. I would certainly welcome the opportunity to do something like that as long as it were something that I liked or had respect for visually."

== Equipment ==
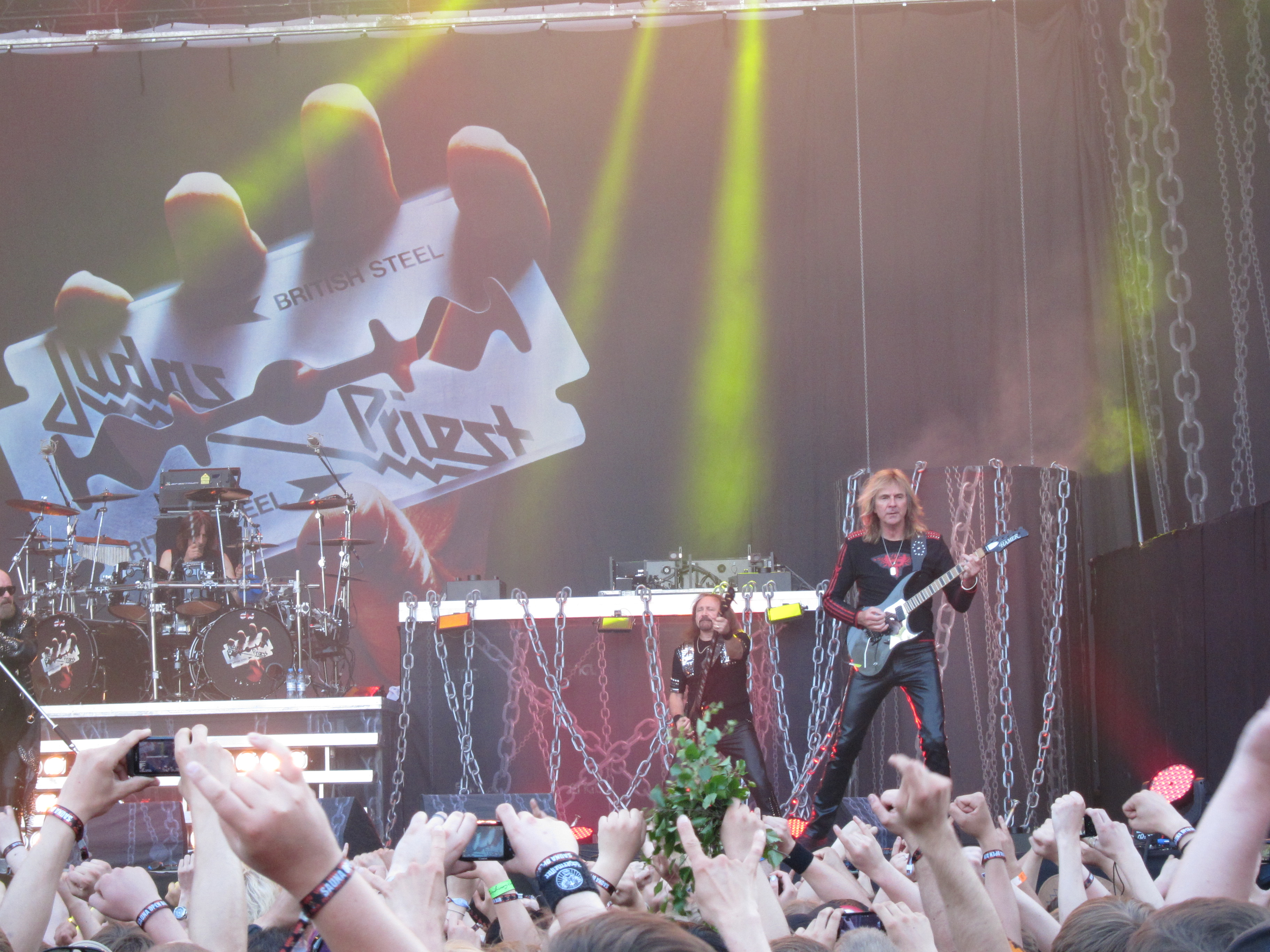
Judas Priest performing at Sauna Open Air in 2011. Tipton (far right) is playing on his signature Hamer model.

=== Tone ===
In the late 1980s, around the time of the Turbo album, Priest began incorporating guitar synths. Starting with the comeback album Jugulator, Glenn switched to Rocktron preamps, the Rocktron Intellifex for effects, and Crate heads and cabs. Tipton used SGs and a Stratocaster with two DiMarzio Super Distortion humbuckers as his main instruments until the mid 80s when he started using various Hamer guitars including some signature models, which were used almost exclusively in live performances until 2009 when the Stratocaster and one of the SGs was brought out of retirement for the British Steel 30th anniversary tour. Most of his guitars are equipped with Kahler tremolos. Glenn uses standard-light (10–46) gauge strings produced by Ernie Ball and thin picks. Throughout his career, Glenn has used many tunings, most frequently standard tuning (almost all of the songs written before Rob Halford left the band were originally in E-standard). Ever since Rob Halford rejoined Judas Priest, both Glenn and KK have used E-flat tuning during live shows, while still using standard tuning extensively on studio albums.

=== Guitars ===
Tipton has used numerous guitars over the years. These include a 1960s Fender Stratocaster up until about 1978. During the period from 1978 to 1979, he used a black Gibson Les Paul Custom, and he started using a modified CBS-era Fender Stratocaster with Dimarzio Super Distortion humbucker pickups. For the Screaming for Vengeance tour, he added a chrome pickguard. For this tour, he also played a Gibson SG Special that he spray-painted black himself. The SG also had a chrome pickguard and stock P.A.F. humbuckers. Around 1984, he switched to a Hamer Phantom GT model, which was fitted with one EMG humbucker, a Kahler tremolo, and one volume pot. A signature model of this was developed and sold to public from 1984 to 1986. Tipton still uses this guitar model, but now with Seymour Duncan Blackouts active pickups. In 2009, Tipton took his Fender Stratocaster and Gibson SG Special out of retirement for the British Steel 30th Anniversary tour. As of late 2015, he is now officially endorsing ESP guitars, with his own signature model, the GT-600, which is part of ESP's LTD series of guitars and in terms of shape is modeled after ESP's Viper series of guitars.

He has also used various guitars over the years

- ESP LTD GT-600 – using currently
- Fender Telecaster – For studio use
- ESP Eclipse acoustic – For stage use
- Ibanez 7621 seven-string guitar – In the studio for Demolition (Possibly used for the song "In Between")
- Gibson Explorer – Could be seen on the Classic Albums: British Steel documentary and was used sparingly during the Nostradamus tour
- Legends custom-built acrylic Jaguar-shaped guitar – Tipton jokingly admitted that he wanted to make a lamp out of it, but liked the tone of it and was used for recording Demolition),
- Roland G-707 synth guitar – was mostly used in the studio, used a Hamer Phantom GT with a Roland Hex pickup for stage use

=== Amplification ===
Tipton has almost exclusively used Marshall Amplifiers for live performances. Tipton used 50 and 100 watt Marshall heads without a master volume until 1981, when the JCM 800 head was developed. The JCM 800 was used by Tipton and fellow Judas Priest guitarist K.K. Downing for many years. During the Jugulator and Demolition era, Tipton was endorsed by Crate amplifiers, using their Blue Voodoo heads in the studio, home, and when touring. He dropped this endorsement during the 2004 reunion tour for live performances switching to a large rack unit with multiple preamps and effects processors with a Marshall 9100 power amp.

In 2008, Tipton began using ENGL amps. Of the brand, he comments, "ENGL is the first ampline that I have ever used that not only has balls, but attitude, right out of the box". When he first used Engl amps, he played through the ENGL Midi Tube Preamp E 580 and the ENGL Tube Poweramp E 850/50. For the Epitaph tour, he switched to using ENGL Invaders that are modified to use 6L6 power tubes.

Glenn uses for his home studio in England (and primary practice amp) the generation 1: Crate Blue Voodoo BV 120H all tube, all American head with the blue tolex (not the black or red tolex of later generations). This amp is seen in several of his demonstration videos and guitar collection tour videos online and caused a run on this amp by fans forcing the prices to rise rapidly in the used market for shrinking supply of the amp (due to its age and limited production run) ...this phenomenon is not unlike the fan run situation on the small marshall amps (5005) used by Billy Gibbons of ZZ Top.

=== Effects ===
During the late 1970s and early 1980s, Tipton used a Pete Cornish custom pedalboard with an overdrive unit, flanger, MXR distortion unit, MXR Phase 100, MXR digital delay, MXR 12-band EQ, Maestro Echoplex, line boosters between each effect to preserve the signal from input to output, and a Rangemaster-based custom treble boost connected to the bass channel of Marshall 50 and 100 watt heads with no master volume.

Around the time of the reunion with Rob Halford, Tipton only used a modified Crybaby 535Q Wah, Digitech Tone Driver, DigiTech Main Squeeze, and a Yamaha midi board controlling other effects and sounds in a rack unit.

Since the beginning of the 2008 world tour, Glenn has gone back to mostly using a rack system, sans the current use of Engl amp heads. He currently uses a Korg rack tuner, Furman power unit, Dunlop Custom Shop Rackmounted Crybaby, Rocktron Intellifex and Yamaha SPX-90 multi-effects units, and a dbx 166A compressor and noise gate.

=== Guitar rig and signal flow ===
A detailed gear diagram of Glenn Tipton's 2004 Judas Priest guitar rig is well-documented.

== Recognition and honours ==
- He was ranked No. 19 on rock magazine Hit Parader's list of 100 greatest metal guitarists.
- He was ranked No. 28 on Gigwise's Top 50 Guitarists.
- He was ranked No. 9 on MusicRadar's The 20 Greatest Metal Guitarists Ever.
- He was ranked No. 25 on Joel Mclver's 100 Greatest Metal Guitarists.
- Sun Kil Moon released a song titled "Glenn Tipton" on their album Ghosts of the Great Highway.
- In the popular video game Guitar Hero II, a playable character called Izzy Sparks, wears clothes very similar to the ones Glenn Tipton used during the Screaming for Vengeance tour 1983.
- Kerry King of Slayer has stated that Tipton is one of the most underrated guitarists in the world. He stated that Tipton is one of his earliest guitar influences.
- Jeff Waters: "Glenn Tipton, along with partners KK Downing and Rob Halford, has come up with the most killer metal riffing, with elite, groundbreaking, original songwriting, and with blues-influenced lead guitar shredding. Judas Priest and Tipton's work are arguably more worthy of the term metal than any other, with Tony Iommi and Black Sabbath their only close rivals".

== Discography ==
=== Solo ===
- Baptizm of Fire (1997)
- Edge of the World (2006) (with John Entwistle and Cozy Powell)

=== Judas Priest ===
See the Judas Priest discography for the complete list of Judas Priest albums, as Tipton played guitar for all Priest's album releases.

=== Contributions ===
- Guest musician on the song "Drink the Fear" from the 1995 album Foma by post-grunge band The Nixons.
- Guest musician on the song "Spirit of America" from the 1991 album Just One Night by Samantha Fox.
- Glenn recorded guitar licks for the video game Brütal Legend.
