= List of Judas Priest band members =

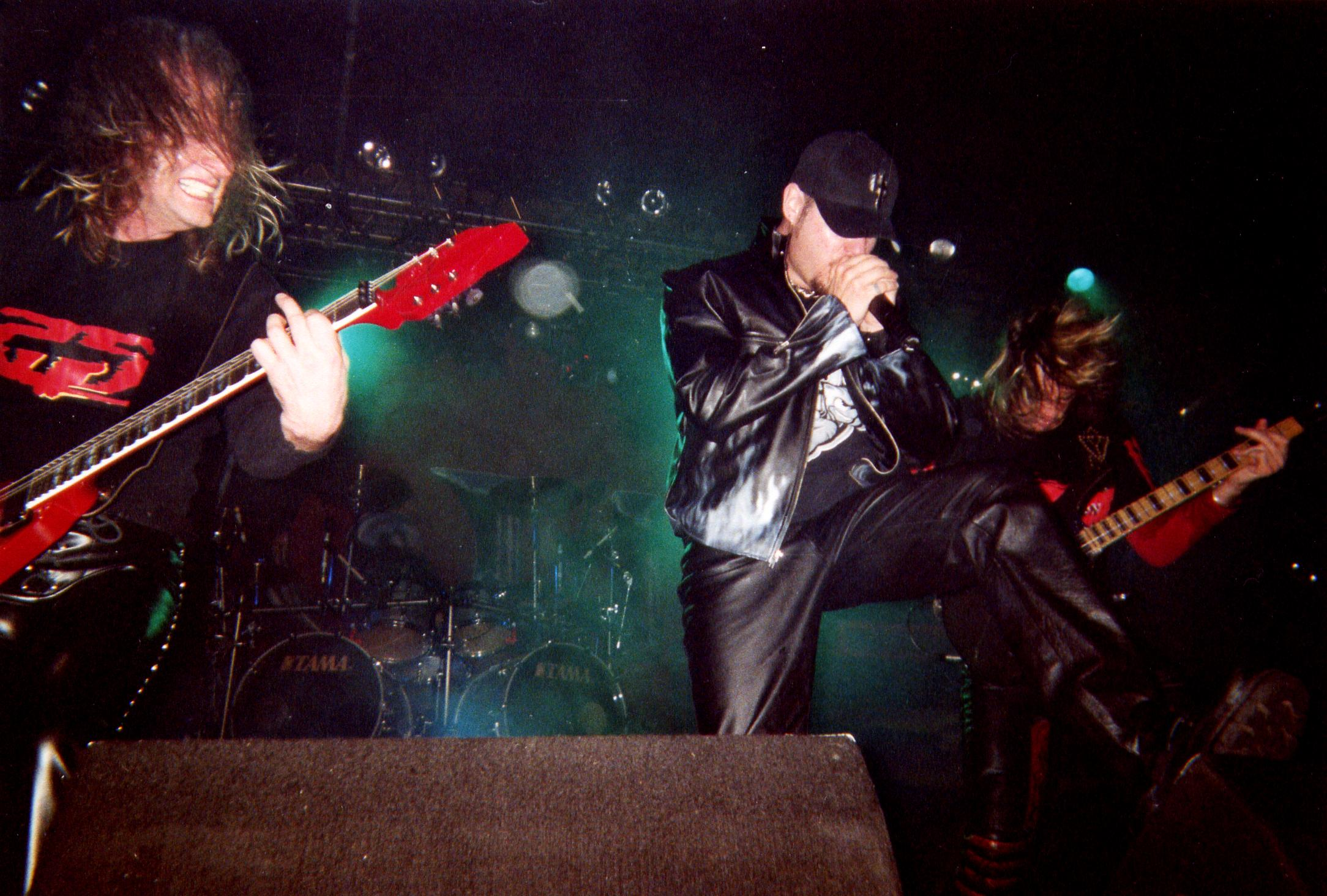
(left to right) K. K. Downing, Scott Travis (on drums), Tim "Ripper" Owens and Glenn Tipton (Ian Hill not shown)

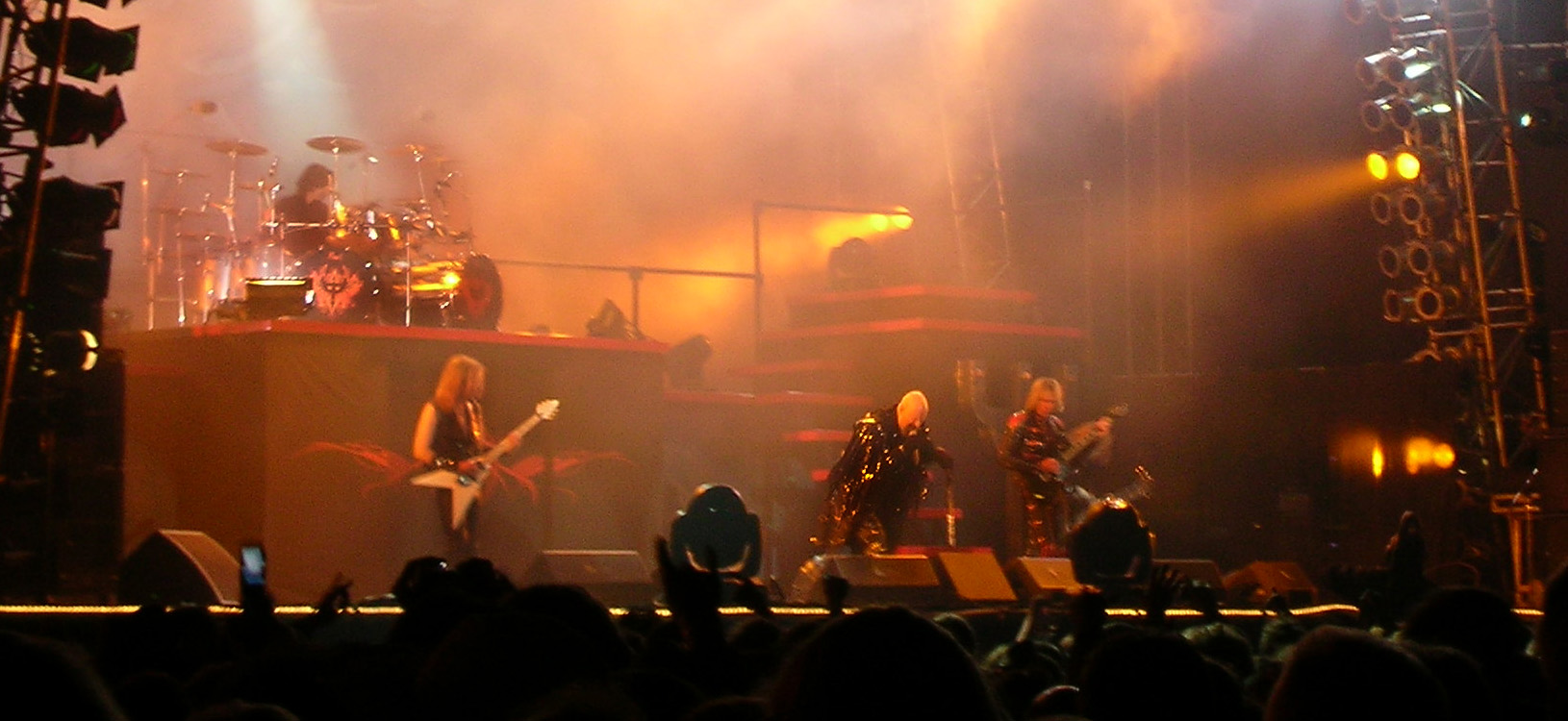
(left to right) Scott Travis, K. K. Downing, Rob Halford, Glenn Tipton and Ian Hill (Obscured)

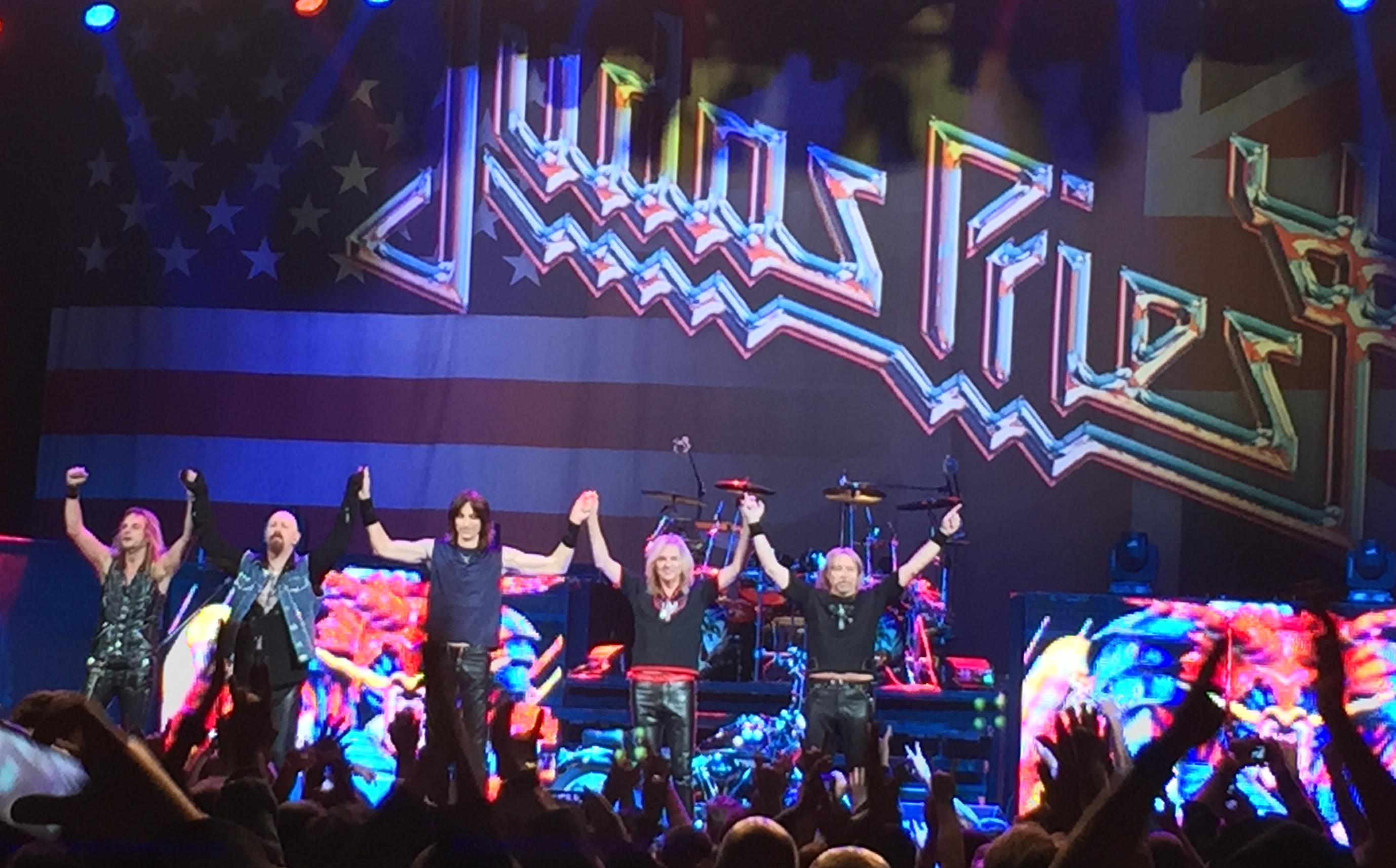
(left to right) Richie Faulkner, Rob Halford, Scott Travis, Glenn Tipton and Ian Hill.

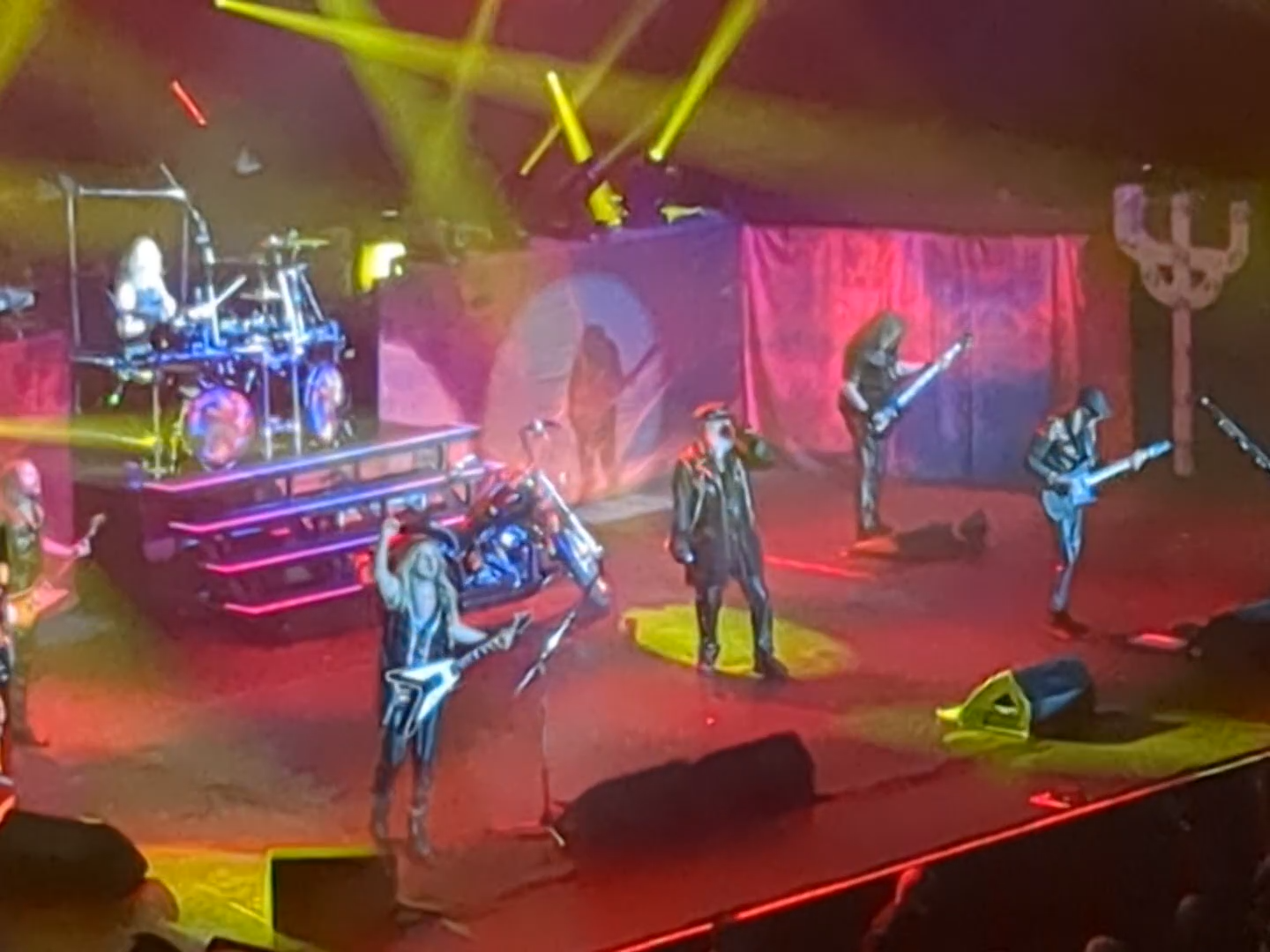
(left to right) Andy Sneap, Scott Travis, Richie Faulkner, Rob Halford, Ian Hill and Glenn Tipton.

Four line-ups of Judas Priest in 2002, 2008, 2014 and 2024.

Judas Priest are an English heavy metal band from Birmingham. Formed in September 1969, the group originally featured vocalist Al Atkins, bassist Bruno Stapenhill, drummer John Partridge and guitarist John Perry (who died shortly after their formation and was replaced by Ernie Chataway). Partridge was replaced by Fred Woolley in 1970 shortly before the band broke up after just seven months, at which point Atkins joined a group called Freight which featured guitarist Kenneth "K. K." Downing, bassist Ian Hill and drummer John Ellis. Freight soon took over the Judas Priest moniker and underwent a succession of drummer changes: Alan Moore replaced Ellis in 1971, who was followed by Chris "Congo" Campbell, and later John Hinch in 1973. Hinch joined alongside his Hiroshima bandmate Rob Halford, after Atkins decided to leave due to the band's frustrations trying to sign a record deal.

== History ==
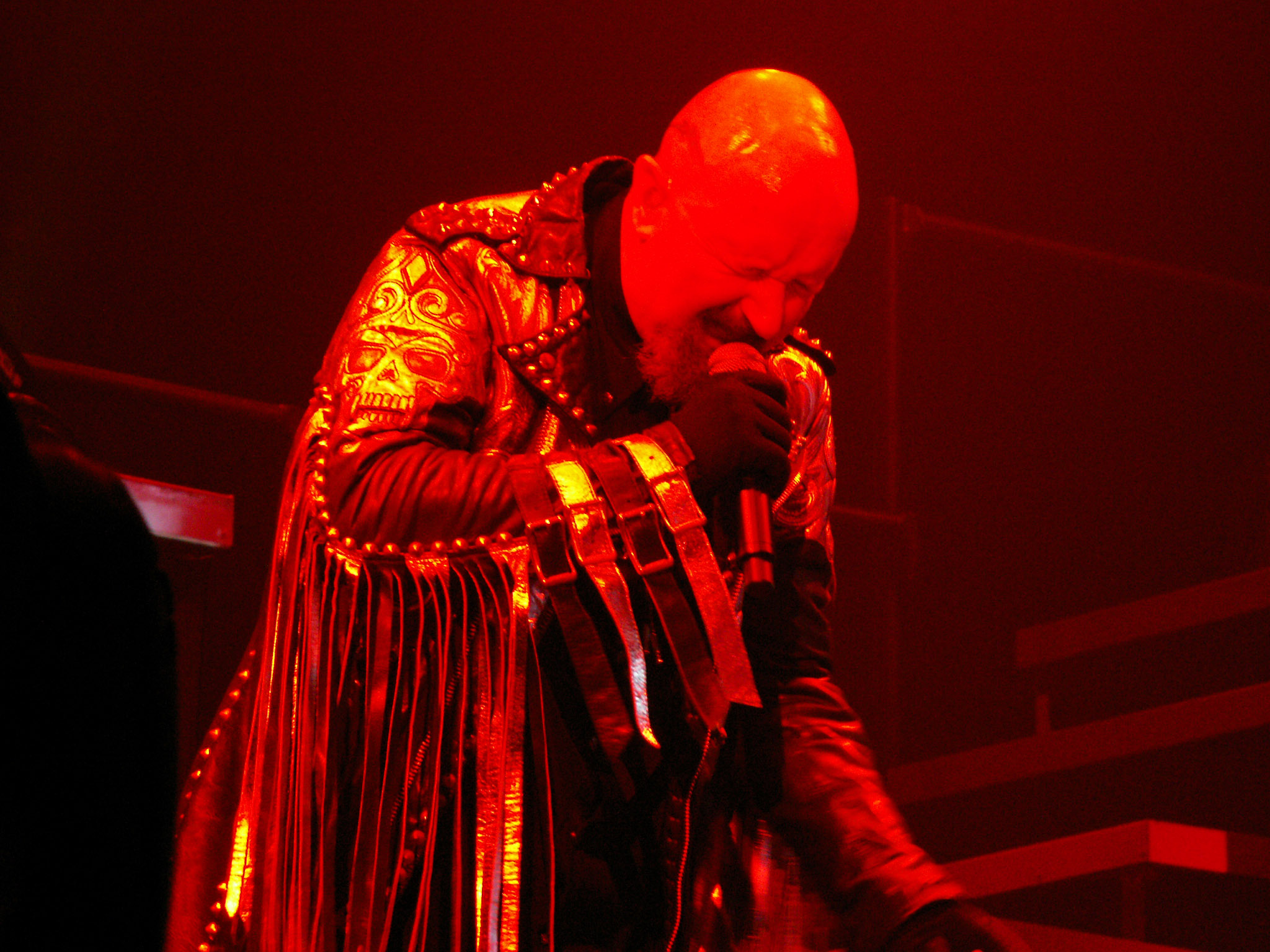
Rob Halford replaced original vocalist Al Atkins alongside drummer John Hinch.

Upon signing a deal with record label Gull in April 1974, Judas Priest enlisted Flying Hat Band frontman Glenn Tipton as co-lead guitarist. After the release and promotion of the band's debut album Rocka Rolla, Hinch was replaced by the returning Moore. The drummer performed on Sad Wings of Destiny, but left again during the sessions for its follow-up Sin After Sin, which were completed by session contributor Simon Phillips. For the album's promotional tour, Les Binks was brought in on drums. Binks remained for the albums Stained Class and Killing Machine, before he left the band and was replaced by former Trapeze drummer Dave Holland in August 1979. This lineup proved to be the most stable to date, producing six studio albums: British Steel, Point of Entry, Screaming for Vengeance, Defenders of the Faith, Turbo and Ram It Down.

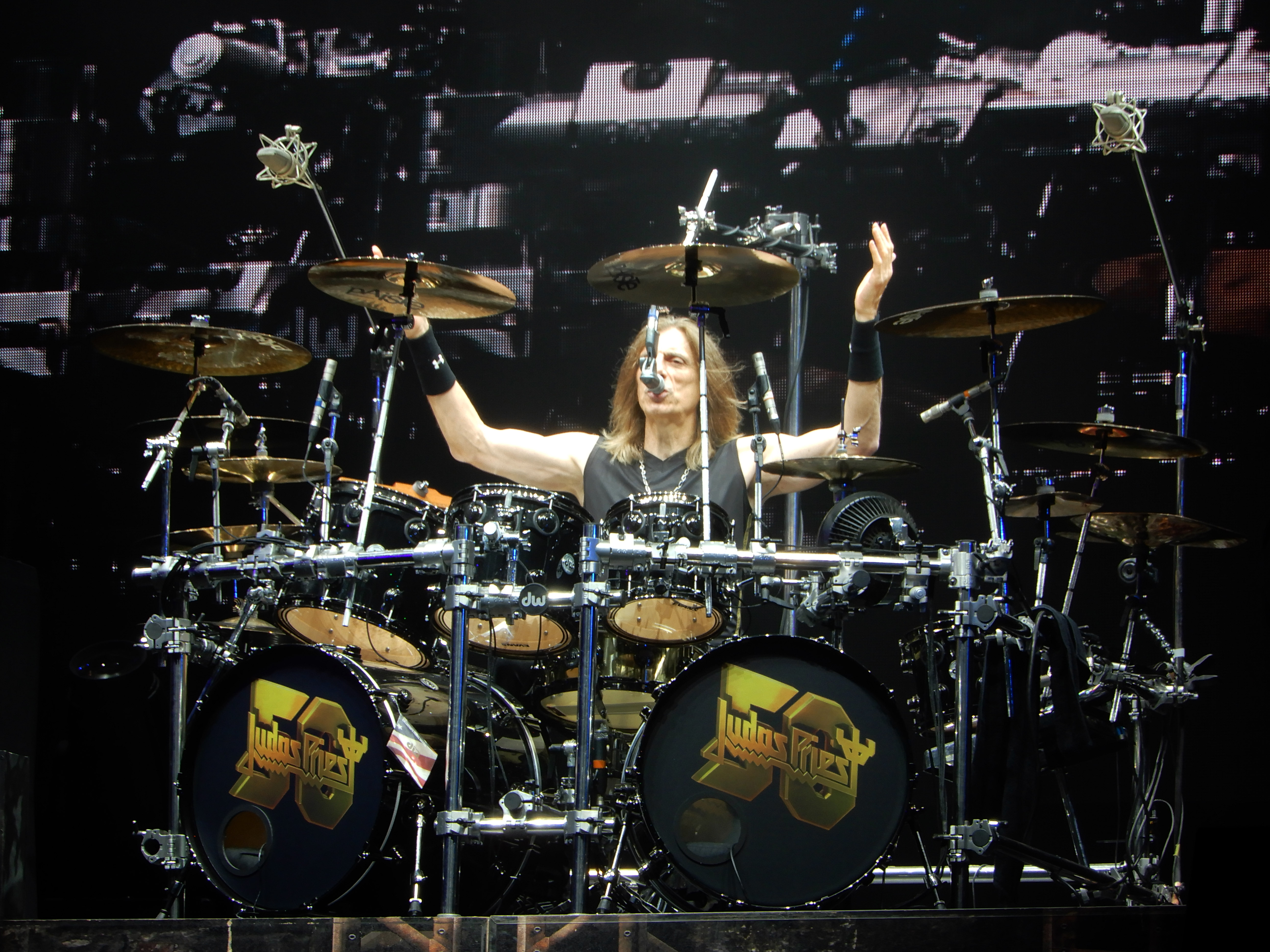
Scott Travis replaced long-time drummer Dave Holland in 1989 and has stayed to be the bands longest tenured drummer.

In November 1989, Scott Travis replaced Holland and debuted on Painkiller. The album was the last at the time to feature Halford, who later left in May 1992 due to musical differences and growing tensions. The group went on hiatus for a few years, before enlisting Tim "Ripper" Owens – frontman of a Judas Priest tribute act called British Steel – as Halford's replacement in May 1996. Owens recorded two albums with the band – 1997's Jugulator and 2001's Demolition – before Halford rejoined in July 2003. 2005's Angel of Retribution and 2008's Nostradamus followed, before Downing left and was replaced by Richie Faulkner in April 2011. The guitarist's departure was reportedly due to differences with other band members and management. In February 2018, Tipton ceased touring full-time with the band after being diagnosed with Parkinson's disease, with Andy Sneap taking his place on tour, and Tipton making occasional appearances on subsequent tours.

== Members ==
=== Current ===
Image	Name	Years active	Instruments	Release contributions
	Rob Halford	1973–1992; 2003–present	lead vocals; harmonica (1974)	all Judas Priest releases from Rocka Rolla (1974) to Painkiller (1990), and from Angel of Retribution (2005) onwards
	Glenn Tipton	1974–present (not touring full-time since 2018)	guitars; backing vocals; keyboards; synthesisers	all Judas Priest releases
	Scott Travis	1989–present	drums; backing vocals (since 2014)	all Judas Priest releases from Painkiller (1990) onwards
	Richie Faulkner	2011–present	guitars; backing vocals	all Judas Priest releases from Redeemer of Souls (2014) onwards

=== Former ===
Image	Name	Years active	Instruments	Release contributions
	Al Atkins	1969–1973	lead vocals	none
	Ian Hill	1970–2026	bass; occasional backing vocals	all Judas Priest releases
	K. K. Downing	1970–2011; 2022 (guest)	guitars; backing vocals; synthesisers (1985–1986)	all Judas Priest releases from Rocka Rolla (1974) to A Touch of Evil: Live (2009)
	John Ellis	1970–1971	drums	none
	Alan "Skip" Moore	1971–1972; 1975–1977	drums	Sad Wings of Destiny (1976)
	Chris "Congo" Campbell	1972–1973	drums	none
	John Hinch	1973–1975 (died 2021)	drums	Rocka Rolla (1974)
	Les Binks	1977–1979; 2022 (guest) (died 2025)	drums	Stained Class (1978); Killing Machine (1978); Unleashed in the East (1979)
	Dave Holland	1979–1989 (died 2018)	drums	all Judas Priest releases from British Steel (1980) to Ram It Down (1988)
	Tim "Ripper" Owens	1996–2003	lead vocals	all Judas Priest releases from Jugulator (1997) to Live in London (2003)

=== Early members ===
Image	Name	Years active	Instruments
	Brian "Bruno" Stapenhill	1969–1970	bass
	John Partridge	1969–1970	drums
	John Perry	1969 (until his death)	guitar
	Ernie Chataway	1969–1970 (died 2014)	guitar
	Fred Woolley	1970	drums

=== Session and Touring ===
Image	Name	Years active	Instruments	Release contributions
	Simon Phillips	1977 (session only)	drums	Sin After Sin (1977)
	Jeff Martin	1985–1986 (session only)	backing vocals	Turbo (1986)
	Don Airey	1990; 1999–2001; 2004; 2006–2007 (all session only)	keyboards; Minimoog bass (1990) (Note: Airey states that he played a Minimoog bass on all tracks of the Painkiller album.)	Painkiller (1990); Demolition (2001); Angel of Retribution (2005); Nostradamus (2008)
	Andy Sneap	2018–2022; 2022–present (Note: Sneap toured with Judas Priest in place of Tipton, following his Parkinson's disease diagnosis. He was dismissed when the band announced it was going to become a quartet in 2022. After five days, Sneap was asked to come back and Judas Priest became a five-piece again.)	producer; guitars; backing vocals	Firepower (2018); Invincible Shield (2024)
	Dave Rimmer	2026–present	bass	Substitute for Ian Hill and stayed following his retirement.

== Lineups ==
Period	Members	Releases
September — November 1969	Al Atkins – vocals; Bruno Stapenhill – bass; John Partridge – drums; John Perry – guitars	none
November 1969 – March 1970	Al Atkins – vocals; Bruno Stapenhill – bass; John Partridge – drums; Ernie Chataway – guitars	none
March — April 1970	Al Atkins – vocals; Bruno Stapenhill – bass; Ernie Chataway – guitars; Fred Woolley – drums	none
Band inactive April – October 1970
October 1970 – June 1971	Al Atkins – vocals; Ian Hill – bass; K. K. Downing – guitars; John Ellis – drums	none
June 1971 – June 1972	Al Atkins – vocals; Ian Hill – bass; K. K. Downing – guitars; Alan Moore – drums	none
June 1972 – May 1973	Al Atkins – vocals; Ian Hill – bass; K. K. Downing – guitars; Chris Campbell – drums	none
May 1973 – April 1974	Ian Hill – bass; K. K. Downing – guitars, backing vocals; Rob Halford – lead vocals; John Hinch – drums	none
April 1974 — October 1975	Ian Hill – bass; K. K. Downing – guitars, backing vocals; Rob Halford – lead vocals; John Hinch – drums; Glenn Tipton – guitars, backing vocals, keyboards	Rocka Rolla (1974)
October 1975 – January 1977	Rob Halford – lead vocals; K. K. Downing – guitars, backing vocals; Glenn Tipton – guitars, backing vocals, keyboards; Ian Hill – bass; Alan Moore – drums	Sad Wings of Destiny (1976)
January – March 1977	Ian Hill – bass; K. K. Downing – guitars, backing vocals; Rob Halford – lead vocals; Glenn Tipton – guitars, backing vocals, keyboards; Simon Phillips – drums (session musician)	Sin After Sin (1977)
March 1977 – July 1979	Ian Hill – bass; K. K. Downing – guitars, backing vocals; Rob Halford – lead vocals; Glenn Tipton – guitars, backing vocals, keyboards; Les Binks – drums	Stained Class (1978); Killing Machine (1978); Unleashed in the East (1979)
August 1979 – October 1989	Ian Hill – bass; K. K. Downing – guitars, backing vocals, synthesisers (1985-1986); Rob Halford – lead vocals; Glenn Tipton – guitars, backing vocals, synthesisers (1985-1986); Dave Holland – drums	British Steel (1980); Point of Entry (1981); Screaming for Vengeance (1982); Judas Priest Live (Recorded 1982, released 2006); Defenders of the Faith (1984); Turbo (1986); Priest...Live! (1987); Ram It Down (1988)
November 1989 – May 1992	Ian Hill – bass; K. K. Downing – guitars, backing vocals; Rob Halford – lead vocals; Glenn Tipton – guitars, backing vocals; Scott Travis – drums	Painkiller (1990)
Band inactive May 1992 – May 1996
May 1996 – July 2003	Ian Hill – bass; K. K. Downing – guitars, backing vocals; Glenn Tipton – guitars, backing vocals; Scott Travis – drums; Tim "Ripper" Owens – lead vocals	Jugulator (1997); '98 Live Meltdown (1998); Demolition (2001); Live in London (2003)
July 2003 – April 2011	Ian Hill – bass; K. K. Downing – guitars, backing vocals, synthesisers (2006-2007); Glenn Tipton – guitars, backing vocals, synthesisers (2006-2007); Scott Travis – drums; Rob Halford – lead vocals	Angel of Retribution (2005); Rising in the East (2005); Nostradamus (2008); A Touch of Evil: Live (2009)
April 2011 – February 2018	Ian Hill – bass; Glenn Tipton – guitars, backing vocals; Scott Travis – drums, backing vocals; Rob Halford – lead vocals; Richie Faulkner – guitars, backing vocals	Epitaph (2013); Redeemer of Souls (2014); Battle Cry (2016); Firepower (2018)
February 2018 – 10 January 2022	Ian Hill – bass; Glenn Tipton – guitars, backing vocals (recording and occasional live); Scott Travis – drums, backing vocals; Rob Halford – lead vocals; Richie Faulkner – guitars, backing vocals; Andy Sneap – guitars (touring and production)	Firepower World Tour
10–15 January 2022	Ian Hill – bass; Glenn Tipton – guitars, backing vocals (recording); Scott Travis – drums, backing vocals; Rob Halford – lead vocals; Richie Faulkner – guitars, backing vocals	none
15 January 2022 – present	Ian Hill – bass; Glenn Tipton – guitars, backing vocals (recording and occasional live); Scott Travis – drums, backing vocals; Rob Halford – lead vocals; Richie Faulkner – guitars, backing vocals; Andy Sneap – guitars, backing vocals (touring and production)	Invincible Shield (2024)

== Bibliography ==
- Popoff, Martin (8 November 2007), Judas Priest: Heavy Metal Painkillers – An Illustrated History, Toronto, Ontario, Canada: ECW Press, ISBN 978-1550227840
