= World Wide Blitz Tour =

1981 concert tour by Judas Priest

- Tour by Judas Priest
- Poster to the concert in Karlsruhe, Germany
- Location: Europe; North America
- Associated album: Point of Entry
- Start date: 13 February 1981
- End date: 14 December 1981
- Legs: 5
- No. of shows: 115 (116 scheduled)

Judas Priest concert chronology
- British Steel Tour (1980); World Wide Blitz Tour (1981); World Vengeance Tour (1982–1983)

The World Wide Blitz Tour was a 1981 concert tour by English heavy metal band Judas Priest where the band toured in Europe and North America from 13 February to 14 December 1981 in support of the album Point of Entry.

== Overview ==
=== Europe (first leg) ===
For the first European leg of the tour, the band was supported by Saxon, who were promoting their album, "Strong Arm of the Law."

=== North American leg ===
Savoy Brown supported the band for the first month of the leg until the end of May. Iron Maiden, who were promoting their album Killers, supported the band after that. Humble Pie would co-headline all of the June dates with Priest and Maiden. Whitesnake would then be the co-headliner throughout most of the July dates. Joe Perry opened a couple of the later shows in July.

The only official Judas Priest track recorded during this tour, a performance of "The Green Manalishi (With the Two Prong Crown)" from a show at Palladium in New York City, is featured on the "Some Heads Are Gonna Roll" single released in February 1984. The same track is found on the Metalogy box set.

=== Europe (final leg) ===
The final European leg was supported by Def Leppard, who were promoting their album, High 'n' Dry, and Accept.

== Personnel ==
- Rob Halford – Lead vocals
- Glenn Tipton – Lead/rhythm guitar and background vocals
- K.K. Downing – Rhythm/lead guitar and background vocals
- Ian Hill – Bass and background vocals
- Dave Holland – Drums

== Setlist ==
The setlist varied throughout the tour. The European leg had a setlist of:

1. "Hell Bent For Leather"
2. "The Ripper"
3. "Diamonds & Rust" (Joan Baez cover)
4. "Grinder"
5. "Sinner"
6. "Breaking the Law"
7. "Beyond the Realms of Death"
8. "Troubleshooter"
9. "Metal Gods"
10. "Hot Rockin'"
11. "You Don't Have to Be Old to Be Wise"
12. "Victim of Changes"
13. "The Green Manalishi (With the Two Prong Crown)" (Fleetwood Mac cover)
14. "Living After Midnight"
15. "Tyrant"

The typical setlist for the North American leg and second European leg

1. "Solar Angels"
2. "Heading Out to the Highway"
3. "Diamonds ^ Rust" (Replaced by "Metal Gods" on second European leg)
4. "Troubleshooter" (Replaced by "Hell Bent for Leather" after 6 May 1981)
5. "Breaking the Law"
6. "Sinner"
7. "Beyond the Realms of Death"
8. "Grinder"
9. "Desert Plains"
10. "Hot Rockin'"
11. "You Don't Have to Be Old to Be Wise"
12. "Victim of Changes"
13. "The Green Manalishi (With the Two Prong Crown)" (Fleetwood Mac cover)
14. "Living After Midnight"
15. "Tyrant"

Also occasionally played were:

- "United" (Played on 6 to 8 November and 12 December)
- "Genocide" (Played on 10 July)
- "Rapid Fire" (Played on 10 July)
- "Exciter" (Played on 10 July) in Atlanta

== Tour dates ==
Date	City	Country	Venue	Opening Act(s)
Europe
13 February 1981	Kerkrade	Netherlands	Rodahal	Saxon
14 February 1981	Amsterdam	Netherlands	Jaap Edenhal	Saxon
15 February 1981	Brussels	Belgium	Forest National	Saxon
16 February 1981	Paris	France	Hippodrome de Pantin	Saxon
17 February 1981	Paris	France	Hippodrome de Pantin	Saxon
18 February 1981	Ravensburg	West Germany	Oberschwabenhalle	Saxon
19 February 1981	Neunkirchen am Brand	West Germany	Hemmerleinhalle	Saxon
20 February 1981	Sindelfingen	West Germany	Messehalle	Saxon
21 February 1981	Dortmund	West Germany	Westfalenhallen	Saxon
23 February 1981	Düsseldorf	West Germany	Philipshalle	Saxon
24 February 1981	Ludwigshafen	West Germany	Friedrich-Ebert-Halle	Saxon
25 February 1981	Hanover	West Germany	Niedersachsenhalle	Saxon
26 February 1981	Kassel	West Germany	Messehalle	Saxon
27 February 1981	Wiesbaden	West Germany	Rhein-Main Halle	Saxon
28 February 1981	Strasbourg	France	Hall Tivoli	Saxon
1 March 1981	Cambrai	France	Palais des Grottes	Saxon
3 March 1981	Hamburg	West Germany	Hamburg Music Hall	Saxon
4 March 1981	West Berlin	West Germany	Neue Welt	Saxon
6 March 1981	Kiel	West Germany	Sparkassen-Arena	Saxon
8 March 1981	Stockholm	Sweden	Stockholm Concert Hall	Saxon
North America
1 May 1981	Richfield	United States	Richfield Coliseum	Savoy Brown
2 May 1981	Louisville	United States	Louisville Gardens	Savoy Brown
4 May 1981	Columbus	United States	Veterans Memorial Auditorium	Savoy Brown
5 May 1981	Springfield	United States	Prairie Capital Convention Center	Savoy Brown
6 May 1981	Indianapolis	United States	Indiana Convention Center	Savoy Brown
7 May 1981	South Bend	United States	Morris Civic Auditorium	Savoy Brown
8 May 1981	Chicago	United States	International Amphitheatre	Savoy Brown
9 May 1981	Rockford	United States	Rockford Metro Center	Savoy Brown
10 May 1981	Milwaukee	United States	Milwaukee Auditorium	Savoy Brown
12 May 1981	Des Moines	United States	Des Moines Veterans Memorial Auditorium	Savoy Brown
14 May 1981	Bloomington	United States	Met Center	Savoy Brown
15 May 1981	Omaha	United States	Omaha Civic Auditorium	Savoy Brown
16 May 1981	St. Louis	United States	Kiel Auditorium	Savoy Brown
17 May 1981	Kansas City	United States	Memorial Hall	Savoy Brown
19 May 1981	Salt Lake City	United States	Salt Palace	Savoy Brown
21 May 1981	San Bernardino	United States	Swing Auditorium	Savoy Brown
22 May 1981	Oakland	United States	Oakland Civic Auditorium	Savoy Brown, Ranger
23 May 1981	Long Beach	United States	Long Beach Arena	Savoy Brown
24 May 1981	Bakersfield	United States	Bakersfield Civic Auditorium	Savoy Brown
25 May 1981	San Diego	United States	SDSU Open Air Theater	Savoy Brown
27 May 1981	Fresno	United States	Selland Arena	Savoy Brown
29 May 1981	Portland	United States	Veterans Memorial Coliseum	Savoy Brown
30 May 1981	Seattle	United States	Seattle Center Arena	Savoy Brown
3 June 1981	Las Vegas	United States	Aladdin Theatre for the Performing Arts	Humble Pie, Iron Maiden
4 June 1981	Phoenix	United States	Arizona Veterans Memorial Coliseum	Humble Pie, Iron Maiden
5 June 1981	El Paso	United States	El Paso County Coliseum	Humble Pie, Iron Maiden
6 June 1981	Odessa	United States	Ector County Coliseum	Humble Pie, Iron Maiden
7 June 1981	Lubbock	United States	Lubbock Municipal Coliseum	Humble Pie, Iron Maiden
9 June 1981	McAllen	United States	La Villa Real Convention Center	Humble Pie, Iron Maiden
10 June 1981	Laredo	United States	Laredo Civic Center	Humble Pie, Iron Maiden
11 June 1981	San Antonio	United States	Convention Center Arena	Humble Pie, Iron Maiden
12 June 1981	Austin	United States	Austin Municipal Auditorium	Humble Pie, Iron Maiden
13 June 1981	Dallas	United States	Moody Coliseum	Humble Pie, Iron Maiden
14 June 1981	Houston	United States	Sam Houston Coliseum	Humble Pie, Iron Maiden
27 June 1981	Cleveland	United States	Agora Theatre and Ballroom	Iron Maiden, Whitesnake
1 July 1981	Landover	United States	Capital Centre	Iron Maiden, Whitesnake
2 July 1981	Asbury Park	United States	Asbury Park Convention Hall	Iron Maiden, Whitesnake
3 July 1981	Salisbury	United States	Wicomico Youth and Civic Center	Iron Maiden, Whitesnake
4 July 1981	Norfolk	United States	Norfolk Scope	Iron Maiden, Whitesnake
~~5 July 1981~~	Huntington	United States	Huntington Civic Center	Iron Maiden, Whitesnake
7 July 1981	Pittsburgh	United States	Stanley Theatre	Iron Maiden, Whitesnake
9 July 1981	Myrtle Beach	United States	Myrtle Beach Convention Center	Iron Maiden, Whitesnake
10 July 1981	Atlanta	United States	Fox Theatre	Iron Maiden, Whitesnake
11 July 1981	Johnson City	United States	Freedom Hall Civic Center	Iron Maiden, Whitesnake
12 July 1981	Memphis	United States	Ellis Auditorium	Iron Maiden, Whitesnake
14 July 1981	Evansville	United States	Roberts Municipal Stadium	Iron Maiden, Whitesnake
15 July 1981	Trotwood	United States	Hara Arena	Iron Maiden, Whitesnake
16 July 1981	Johnstown	United States	Cambria County War Memorial Arena	Iron Maiden, Whitesnake
17 July 1981	Buffalo	United States	Shea's Buffalo	Iron Maiden, Whitesnake
18 July 1981	Rochester	United States	Rochester Auditorium	Iron Maiden, Whitesnake
19 July 1981	Syracuse	United States	Landmark Theatre	Iron Maiden, Whitesnake
21 July 1981	Albany	United States	Palace Theatre	Iron Maiden
22 July 1981	New York City	United States	Palladium	Iron Maiden
23 July 1981	New York City	United States	Palladium	Iron Maiden
24 July 1981	New York City	United States	Palladium	Iron Maiden
25 July 1981	New Haven	United States	New Haven Coliseum	Iron Maiden, Joe Perry
26 July 1981	Allentown	United States	Great Allentown Fair	Iron Maiden, Joe Perry
28 July 1981	Boston	United States	Orpheum Theatre	Iron Maiden
29 July 1981	Baltimore	United States	Baltimore Civic Center	Iron Maiden
30 July 1981	Upper Darby Township	United States	Tower Theater	Iron Maiden
31 July 1981	New York City	United States	Pier 84	
Europe
6 November 1981	Kingston upon Hull	England	Hull City Hall	
7 November 1981	Manchester	England	Manchester Apollo	
8 November 1981	Manchester	England	Manchester Apollo	
9 November 1981	Leicester	England	De Montfort Hall	
10 November 1981	Bristol	England	Colston Hall	
11 November 1981	Cardiff	Wales	Sophia Gardens Pavilion	
12 November 1981	Birmingham	England	Birmingham Odeon	
13 November 1981	Birmingham	England	Birmingham Odeon	
15 November 1981	Glasgow	Scotland	The Apollo	
16 November 1981	Newcastle	England	Newcastle City Hall	
17 November 1981	Newcastle	England	Newcastle City Hall	
18 November 1981	Sheffield	England	Sheffield City Hall	
19 November 1981	Sheffield	England	Sheffield City Hall	
20 November 1981	Crawley	England	Crawley Leisure Centre	
21 November 1981	London	England	Hammersmith Odeon	
22 November 1981	London	England	Hammersmith Odeon	
23 November 1981	Southampton	England	Gaumont Theatre	
24 November 1981	Poole	England	Poole Arts Centre	
Europe
27 November 1981	Wiesbaden	West Germany	Rhein-Main Halle	Def Leppard, Accept
28 November 1981	Neunkirchen am Brand	West Germany	Hemmerleinhalle	Def Leppard, Accept
29 November 1981	Friedrichshafen	West Germany	Stadthalle	Def Leppard, Accept
30 November 1981	Saarbrücken	West Germany	Saarlandhalle	Def Leppard, Accept
1 December 1981	Rüsselsheim	West Germany	Walter-Köbel-Halle	Def Leppard, Accept
2 December 1981	Karlsruhe	West Germany	Schwarzwaldhalle	Def Leppard, Accept
3 December 1981	Ludwigshafen	West Germany	Friedrich-Ebert-Halle	Def Leppard, Accept
4 December 1981	Munich	West Germany	Rudi-Sedlmayer-Halle	Def Leppard, Accept
5 December 1981	Lausanne	Switzerland	Palais de Beaulieu	Def Leppard, Accept
6 December 1981	Clermont-Ferrand	France	Clermont-Ferrand Sports Hall	Def Leppard, Accept
7 December 1981	Nogent-sur-Marne	France	Pavillon Baltard	Def Leppard, Accept
8 December 1981	Strasbourg	France	Hall Rhenus	Def Leppard, Accept
9 December 1981	Lille	France	Palias De Sports	Def Leppard, Accept
11 December 1981	Brussels	Belgium	Forest National	Def Leppard, Accept
12 December 1981	Amsterdam	Netherlands	Jaap Edenhal	Def Leppard, Accept
13 December 1981	Essen	West Germany	Grugahalle	Def Leppard, Accept
14 December 1981	Hamburg	West Germany	Markthalle Hamburg	Def Leppard, Accept

== Boxscore ==
City	Venue	Tickets sold	Gross revenue (adjusted for inflation)
South Bend	Morris Civic Auditorium	2,274	$55,812
St. Louis	Kiel Auditorium	5,700	$134,466
Kansas City	Memorial Hall	1,850	$41,332
San Bernardino	Swing Auditorium	6,655	$168,923
Oakland	Civic Auditorium	4,891	$133,367
Long Beach	Long Beach Arena	10,090	$238,269
Portland	Memorial Coliseum	6,831	$175,756
Seattle	Center Arena	6,000	$160,163
Pittsburgh	Stanley Theater	3,347	$89,261
Johnson City	Freedom Hall	4,982	$114,570
Memphis	Ellis Auditorium	3,722	$84,256
Rochester	Auditorium	2,574	$64,341
