= The Best of Judas Priest: Living After Midnight =

Greatest hits album by Judas Priest
- Released: 1997
- Genre: Heavy metal
- Length: 64:36
- Label: Columbia
- Producer: Sony

Judas Priest chronology
Jugulator (1997)	The Best of Judas Priest: Living After Midnight (1997)	'98 Live Meltdown (1998)

Professional ratings
Review scores
Source	Rating
AllMusic	4.5/5 stars

The Best of Judas Priest: Living After Midnight is a compilation album of Judas Priest's hits, dating from their 1978 album Killing Machine (Hell Bent for Leather in the United States) through Painkiller (1990). This album was released in 1997. In 2009 the album was reported to have sold 564,000 copies in the United States.

In the booklet, the band lists its entire Sony/Columbia discography. As a result, tracks from the group's first two albums Rocka Rolla and Sad Wings of Destiny are not featured, having been recorded for Gull Records and for which the band no longer owned the copyright.

== Track listing (US release) ==
No.	Title	Writer(s)	Original album	Length
1.	"The Green Manalishi (with the Two-Pronged Crown)" (Fleetwood Mac cover)	Peter Green	Killing Machine (1978)	3:22
2.	"Living After Midnight"	Rob Halford, K.K. Downing, Glenn Tipton	British Steel (1980)	3:30
3.	"Breaking the Law" (live)	Halford, Downing, Tipton	Priest...Live! (1987)	2:21
4.	"Hot Rockin'"	Halford, Downing, Tipton	Point of Entry (1981)	3:14
5.	"Heading Out to the Highway" (live)	Halford, Downing, Tipton	Priest...Live! (1987)	4:33
6.	"The Hellion"	Halford, Downing, Tipton	Screaming for Vengeance (1982)	0:42
7.	"Electric Eye"	Halford, Downing, Tipton	Screaming for Vengeance (1982)	3:39
8.	"You've Got Another Thing Comin'"	Halford, Downing, Tipton	Screaming for Vengeance (1982)	5:04
9.	"Turbo Lover"	Halford, Downing, Tipton	Turbo (1986)	4:32
10.	"Freewheel Burning"	Halford, Downing, Tipton	Defenders of the Faith (1984)	4:23
11.	"Some Heads Are Gonna Roll"	Bob Halligan Jr.	Defenders of the Faith (1984)	4:07
12.	"Metal Meltdown"	Halford, Downing, Tipton	Painkiller (1990)	4:48
13.	"Ram It Down"	Halford, Downing, Tipton	Ram It Down (1988)	4:49
14.	"Diamonds & Rust" (live Joan Baez cover)	Joan Baez	Unleashed in the East (1979)	3:39
15.	"Victim of Changes" (live)	Al Atkins, Halford, Downing, Tipton	Unleashed in the East (1979)	7:11
16.	"Tyrant" (live)	Halford, Tipton	Unleashed in the East (1979)	4:42

== Track listing (European release) ==
1. Better by You Better than Me - 3.22
2. Take on the World - 3.02
3. The Green Manalishi (With the Two-Pronged Crown) - 3.24
4. Living After Midnight - 3.31
5. Breaking the Law - 2.35
6. United - 3.30
7. Hot Rockin' - 3.16
8. You've Got Another Thing Comin' - 5.09
9. The Hellion / Electric Eye - 4.22
10. Freewheel Burning - 4.24
11. Some Heads Are Gonna Roll - 4.07
12. Turbo Lover - 5.31
13. Locked In - 4.20
14. Johnny B. Goode - 4.39
15. Ram It Down - 4.50
16. Painkiller - 6.06
17. A Touch of Evil - 5.44
18. Night Crawler - 5.43

== Personnel ==
- Rob Halford: lead vocals
- K.K. Downing: guitars
- Glenn Tipton: guitars
- Ian Hill: bass
- Scott Travis: drums on track 12
- Dave Holland: drums on tracks 2–11, 13
- Les Binks: drums on track 1, 14–16
