= '98 Live Meltdown =

Live album by Judas Priest
- Released: 17 September 1998
- Recorded: Jugulator tour 1998
- Genre: Heavy metal
- Length: 122:31
- Label: SPV/Steamhammer
- Producer: Judas Priest and Sean Lynch

Judas Priest chronology
The Best of Judas Priest: Living After Midnight (1997)	'98 Live Meltdown (1998)	Demolition (2001)

Professional ratings
Review scores
Source	Rating
AllMusic	2/5 stars

'98 Live Meltdown is a concert album by Judas Priest, recorded and released in 1998 and is the first live album to feature new lead singer Tim "Ripper" Owens, recorded during the Jugulator World Tour. A second live album featuring Owens, Live in London, was released in 2003.

The album was reissued as part of the band's limited edition 50 Heavy Metal Years of Music box-set, released on October 2021, through Sony Music Entertainment and Legacy Recordings.

== Track listing ==
Disc one
No.	Title	Writer(s)	Length
1.	"The Hellion"	Rob Halford, K.K. Downing, Glenn Tipton	1:08
2.	"Electric Eye"	Halford, Downing, Tipton	3:47
3.	"Metal Gods"	Halford, Downing, Tipton	4:09
4.	"Grinder"	Halford, Downing, Tipton	4:26
5.	"Rapid Fire"	Halford, Downing, Tipton	4:24
6.	"Blood Stained"	Downing, Tipton	5:08
7.	"The Sentinel"	Halford, Downing, Tipton	5:46
8.	"A Touch of Evil"	Halford, Downing, Tipton, Chris Tsangarides	5:51
9.	"Burn in Hell"	Downing, Tipton	5:34
10.	"The Ripper"	Tipton	3:52
11.	"Bullet Train"	Downing, Tipton	5:58
12.	"Beyond the Realms of Death"	Halford, Les Binks	7:13
13.	"Death Row"	Downing, Tipton	4:22

Disc two
No.	Title	Writer(s)	Length
1.	"Metal Meltdown"	Halford, Downing, Tipton	5:02
2.	"Night Crawler"	Halford, Downing, Tipton	6:11
3.	"Abductors"	Downing, Tipton	5:54
4.	"Victim of Changes"	Al Atkins, Halford, Downing, Tipton	8:31
5.	"Diamonds & Rust" (Joan Baez cover)	Joan Baez	3:54
6.	"Breaking the Law"	Halford, Downing, Tipton	2:36
7.	"The Green Manalishi (With the Two Prong Crown)" (Fleetwood Mac cover)	Peter Green	4:53
8.	"Painkiller"	Halford, Downing, Tipton	6:28
9.	"You've Got Another Thing Comin'"	Halford, Downing, Tipton	8:35
10.	"Hell Bent for Leather"	Tipton	3:48
11.	"Living After Midnight"	Halford, Downing, Tipton	6:01

== Personnel ==
Judas Priest

- Tim "Ripper" Owens – vocals
- Glenn Tipton – guitars
- K. K. Downing – guitars
- Ian Hill – bass guitar
- Scott Travis – drums

Production

- Produced and mixed by Judas Priest and Sean Lynch
- Engineered by Will Shapland
- Mastered by Tim Burrell
- Album cover by Mark Wilkinson
- Photography by Ross Halfin, John McMurtrie, Babz Bell, George Chin, and John Stone

== Charts ==
Chart (1998)	Peak position
German Albums (Offizielle Top 100)	63
Japanese Albums (Oricon)	28
UK Rock & Metal Albums (OCC)	23
