= British Steel Tour =

1980 concert tour by Judas Priest

- Tour by Judas Priest
- Poster with the US tour dates
- Location: Europe; North America
- Associated album: British Steel
- Start date: 7 March 1980
- End date: 23 August 1980
- Legs: 3
- No. of shows: 83

Judas Priest concert chronology
- Hell Bent for Leather Tour (1979); British Steel Tour (1980); World Wide Blitz Tour (1981)

The British Steel Tour was a 1980 concert tour by English heavy metal band Judas Priest where the band toured in Europe and North America from 7 March to 23 August 1980 in support of their 1980 album British Steel.

== Background ==
During the United Kingdom leg, the band was supported by Iron Maiden, who were touring in support of their self-titled debut album.

== Setlist ==
Songs played

1. "Hell Bent for Leather"
2. "Delivering the Goods"
3. "The Ripper"
4. "Metal Gods"
5. "Running Wild"
6. "Living After Midnight"
7. "White Heat, Red Hot"
8. "Sinner"
9. "Beyond the Realms of Death"
10. "Diamonds & Rust" ("Joan Baez" cover)
11. "You Don't Have to Be Old to Be Wise"
12. "Exciter"
13. "Grinder"
14. "Victim of Changes"
15. "Steeler"
16. "Genocide"
17. "Breaking the Law"
18. "Tyrant"
19. "The Green Manalishi (With the Two Prong Crown)" ("Fleetwood Mac" cover) [encore]
20. "Starbreaker" [encore]
21. "Take on the World" [encore]

Typical setlist

1. "Hell Bent for Leather"
2. "The Ripper"
3. "Running Wild"
4. "Living After Midnight"
5. "Sinner"
6. "Beyond the Realms of Death"
7. "You Don't Have to Be Old to Be Wise"
8. "Grinder"
9. "Victim of Changes"
10. "Genocide"
11. "Tyrant"
12. "The Green Manalishi" ("Fleetwood Mac" Cover) [encore]

=== Europe ===
Europe songs played

1. "Hell Bent for Leather"
2. "Delivering the Goods"
3. "Running Wild"
4. "The Ripper"
5. "Living After Midnight"
6. "White Heat, Red Hot"
7. "Beyond the Realms of Death"
8. "Sinner"
9. "The Green Manalishi (With the Two Prong Crown)" (Fleetwood Mac cover)
10. "Grinder"
11. "Victim of Changes"
12. "Breaking the Law"
13. "Genocide"
14. "Starbreaker" [encore]
15. "Take on the World" [encore]
16. "Tyrant" [encore]

Europe Typical setlist

1. "Hell Bent for Leather"
2. "Delivering the Goods"
3. "Running Wild"
4. "The Ripper"
5. "White Heat, Red Hot"
6. "Beyond the Realms of Death"
7. "Sinner"
8. "The Green Manalishi (With the Two Prong Crown)" (Fleetwood Mac cover)
9. "Victim of Changes"
10. "Genocide"
11. "Starbreaker" [encore]
12. "Tyrant" [encore]

Europe typical setlist

1. "Hell Bent for Leather"
2. "Delivering the Goods"
3. "Running Wild"
4. "The Ripper"
5. "White Heat, Red Hot"
6. "Beyond the Realms of Death"
7. "Sinner"
8. "The Green Manalishi (With the Two Prong Crown)" (Fleetwood Mac cover)
9. "Victim of Changes"
10. "Breaking the Law"
11. "Genocide"
12. "Starbreaker" [encore]
13. "Take on the World" [encore]
14. "Tyrant" [encore]

Monsters of Rock England (1980)

1. "Hell Bent for Leather"
2. "The Ripper"
3. "Running Wild"
4. "Living After Midnight"
5. "Sinner"
6. "Beyond the Realms of Death"
7. "You Don't Have to Be Old to Be Wise"
8. "Grinder"
9. "Victim of Changes"
10. "The Green Manalishi (With the Two Prong Crown)" (Fleetwood Mac cover)
11. "Tyrant"

=== North America ===
Songs played

1. "Hell Bent for Leather"
2. "The Ripper"
3. "Metal Gods"
4. "Running Wild"
5. "Living After Midnight"
6. "Sinner"
7. "Diamonds & Rust" (Joan Baez cover)
8. "Beyond the Realms of Death"
9. "Exciter"
10. "You Don't Have to Be Old to Be Wise"
11. "Breaking the Law"
12. "Grinder"
13. "Victim of Changes"
14. "Steeler"
15. "Genocide"
16. "Tyrant"
17. "The Green Manalishi (With the Two Prong Crown)" (Fleetwood Mac cover)

Typical Setlist

1. "Hell Bent for Leather"
2. "Running Wild"
3. "The Ripper"
4. "Living After Midnight"
5. "Sinner"
6. "Beyond the Realms of Death"
7. "You Don't Have to Be Old to Be Wise"
8. "Grinder"
9. "Victim of Changes"
10. "Steeler"
11. "Genocide"
12. "Tyrant"
13. "The Green Manalishi (With the Two Prong Crown)" (Fleetwood Mac cover)

== Tour dates ==
Date	City	Country	Venue
Europe ^{[A]}
7 March 1980	Cardiff	Wales	Cardiff University
8 March 1980	Leeds	England	University of Leeds Refectory
9 March 1980	Bristol	England	Colston Hall
10 March 1980	Manchester	England	Manchester Apollo
11 March 1980	Sheffield	England	Sheffield City Hall
12 March 1980	Sheffield	England	Sheffield City Hall
13 March 1980	Leicester	England	De Montfort Hall
14 March 1980	London	England	Hammersmith Odeon
15 March 1980	London	England	Hammersmith Odeon
16 March 1980	Southampton	England	Gaumont Theatre
18 March 1980	Aberdeen	Scotland	Capitol Theatre
19 March 1980	Edinburgh	Scotland	Edinburgh Odeon
20 March 1980	Newcastle	England	Newcastle City Hall
21 March 1980	Newcastle	England	Mayfair Ballroom
22 March 1980	Glasgow	Scotland	The Apollo
23 March 1980	Queensferry	Wales	Deeside Leisure Centre
24 March 1980	Liverpool	England	Liverpool Empire Theatre
25 March 1980	Stoke-on-Trent	England	Trentham Ballroom
26 March 1980	Birmingham	England	Birmingham Odeon
27 March 1980	Birmingham	England	Birmingham Odeon
1 April 1980	London	England	Rainbow Theatre
Europe
12 April 1980	Hamburg	West Germany	Markthalle Hamburg
13 April 1980	West Berlin	West Germany	Neue Welt
14 April 1980	Hanover	West Germany	Niedersachsenhalle
15 April 1980	Cologne	West Germany	Sartory-Saal
16 April 1980	Neu Isenburg	West Germany	Huguenottenhalle
18 April 1980	Erlangen	West Germany	Heinrich-Lades-Halle
20 April 1980	Munich	West Germany	Schwabinger Braü
21 April 1980	Mannheim	West Germany	Mannheimer Rosengarten
22 April 1980	Karlsruhe	West Germany	Stadthalle
24 April 1980	Rouen	France	Club 44
25 April 1980	Paris	France	Bataclan
26 April 1980	Brussels	Belgium	Forest National
North America
25 May 1980	Fort Worth	United States	Will Rogers Auditorium
26 May 1980	Beaumont	United States	Beaumont Civic Center
28 May 1980	McAllen	United States	La Villa Real Convention Center
29 May 1980	Austin	United States	Oprea House
30 May 1980	Austin	United States	Oprea House
31 May 1980	Houston	United States	Sam Houston Coliseum
1 June 1980	San Antonio	United States	Convention Center Arena
2 June 1980 ^{[B]}	Corpus Christi	United States	Memorial Coliseum
4 June 1980 ^{[B]}	Amarillo	United States	Amarillo Civic Center
6 June 1980 ^{[B]}	Midland	United States	Chaparral Arena
7 June 1980 ^{[B]}	El Paso	United States	El Paso County Coliseum
9 June 1980 ^{[B]}	Tucson	United States	Tucson Community Center
10 June 1980	Albuquerque	United States	Albuquerque Civic Auditorium
12 June 1980	Phoenix	United States	Arizona Veterans Memorial Coliseum
13 June 1980	Long Beach	United States	Long Beach Arena
14 June 1980	San Bernardino	United States	Orange Pavilion
15 June 1980	San Diego	United States	SDSU Amphitheater
17 June 1980	Seattle	United States	Seattle Center Arena
19 June 1980	San Francisco	United States	Warfield Theatre
20 June 1980	Santa Monica	United States	Santa Monica Civic Auditorium
21 June 1980	Portland	United States	Veterans Memorial Coliseum
24 June 1980	Salt Lake City	United States	Salt Palace
25 June 1980	Denver	United States	Rainbow Music Hall
27 June 1980	Milwaukee	United States	Henry Maier Festival Park
28 June 1980	Chicago	United States	International Amphitheatre
29 June 1980 ^{[C]} ^{[D]} ^{[E]}	St. Louis	United States	Busch Stadium (Superjam '80)
1 July 1980	Albany	United States	Palace Theatre
2 July 1980	Rochester	United States	Auditorium Theatre
3 July 1980	Asbury Park	United States	Asbury Park Convention Hall
4 July 1980	Hartford	United States	Agora Ballroom
5 July 1980	Hempstead	United States	Calderone Concert Hall
6 July 1980	Allentown	United States	Agricultural Hall at Allentown Fairgrounds
7 July 1980	Upper Darby Township	United States	Tower Theater
8 July 1980	Towson	United States	Towson Arena
12 July 1980	New York City	United States	Palladium
20 July 1980 ^{[F]} ^{[B]}	Trotwood	United States	Hara Arena
23 July 1980 ^{[F]} ^{[B]}	Kalamazoo	United States	Wings Stadium
25 July 1980	Pekin	United States	Pekin Memorial Arena
27 July 1980^{[G]} ^{[F]} ^{[B]} ^{[H]}	Rockford	United States	Rockford Speedway (Rockford Speedway Jam '80)
28 July 1980 ^{[F]} ^{[B]}	Dubuque	United States	Five Flags Arena
30 July 1980 ^{[F]} ^{[B]}	Cleveland	United States	Cleveland Public Hall
31 July 1980 ^{[F]} ^{[B]}	Pittsburgh	United States	Stanley Theater
2 August 1980 ^{[F]} ^{[B]}	Boston	United States	Orpheum Theatre
3 August 1980 ^{[F]} ^{[B]}	Syracuse	United States	Landmark Theatre
6 August 1980	Saint Paul	United States	Saint Paul Civic Center
Europe
16 August 1980^{[I]} ^{[F]} ^{[C]} ^{[J]} ^{[K]}	Castle Donington	England	Donington Park (Monsters of Rock Donington 1980)
23 August 1980^{[L]} ^{[M]} ^{[N]} ^{[O]} ^{[J]} ^{[P]}	Nuremberg	West Germany	Zeppelin Field (Golden Summer Night Festival '80)

=== Touring Bands ===
^{A} This show was supported by Iron Maiden
^{B} This show was supported by Def Leppard
^{C} This show was in support of April Wine
^{D} This show was in support of Sammy Hagar
^{E} This show was in support of Journey
^{F} This show was supported by Scorpions
^{G} This show was in support of Heart
^{H} This show was supported by Joe Perry
^{I} This show was in support of Rainbow
^{J} This show was supported by Saxon
^{K} This show was supported by Riot
^{L} This show was in support of Ted Nugent
^{M} This show was in support of Johnny Winter
^{N} This show was supported by Molly Hatchet
^{O} This show was supported by Wishbone Ash
^{P} This show was supported by Ian Gillan

=== Boxscore ===
City	Venue	Tickets Sold	Gross Revenue (Adjusted for Inflation)
Long Beach	Long Beach Arena	6,624	$162,646
San Bernardino	Orange Showgrounds Feature Building	2,291	$62,434
San Diego	SDSU Open Air Theater	2,378	$63,673
San Francisco	Warfield Theater	1,364	$31,620
Asbury Park	Asbury Park Convention Hall	3,284	$81,014
New York City	Palladium	3,385	$92,402
Pittsburgh	Stanley Theater	2,999	$78,109
Boston	Boston Orpheum Theatre	2,800	$76,499

=== Cancelled dates ===
Date	City	Country	Venue
June 15, 1980	Fresno	United States	Warnors Theatre

== Personnel ==
- Rob Halford – lead vocals
- Glenn Tipton – lead/rhythm guitar, backing vocals
- K.K. Downing – rhythm/lead guitar, backing vocals
- Ian Hill – bass, backing vocals
- Dave Holland – drums
