= Bullet Train (song) =

Single by Judas Priest

from the album Jugulator
- B-side: "Rapid Fire ('98 version)"; "The Green Manalishi ('98 version)"
- Released: 28 March 1998
- Recorded: 1996–1997
- Studio: Silvermere Studios, Surrey, England
- Genre: Thrash metal
- Length: 5:11
- Label: SPV/Steamhammer
- Songwriters: K. K. Downing, Glenn Tipton
- Producers: Glenn Tipton; K. K. Downing; Sean Lynch

Judas Priest singles chronology
"Burn in Hell" (1997)	"Bullet Train" (1998)	"Machine Man" (2001)

"Bullet Train" is the ninth track and second single by British heavy metal band Judas Priest from their 1997 album Jugulator. The song remains one of the most popular tracks with Tim "Ripper" Owens on vocals and is featured on their live album '98 Live Meltdown.

In 1999, the song was nominated for a Grammy Award for Best Metal Performance but lost to Metallica with their song "Better than You".

== Promotion ==
CMC International held its then biggest promotional campaign to date, which started on September 30, 1997, to coincide with the song's release as a single. CMC would release 200,000 cassette samplers of Jugulator, the first time the label had done a retail sampler campaign.

== Track listing ==
Promo – CD Single (CMC CMCDJ-87232-2)
No.	Title	Writer(s)	Length
1.	"Bullet Train"	Glenn Tipton, K.K. Downing	5:05
2.	"Blood Stained"	Glenn Tipton, K.K. Downing	5:27

Promo – CD Single (Steamhammer 80000128)
No.	Title	Writer(s)	Length
1.	"Bullet Train"	Glenn Tipton, K.K. Downing	5:08

CD Single (Zero XRCN-2024 / EAN 4959407020240)
No.	Title	Writer(s)	Length
1.	"Bullet Train"	Glenn Tipton, K.K. Downing	4:08
2.	"Rapid Fire ('98 version)"	Glenn Tipton, Rob Halford and K.K. Downing	3:53
3.	"The Green Manalishi ('98 version)"	Peter Green	4:10

== Personnel ==
- Tim "Ripper" Owens – vocals
- K. K. Downing – guitars
- Glenn Tipton – guitars
- Ian Hill – bass
- Scott Travis – drums
