= Live in London (Judas Priest album) =

2003 album by Judas Priest

Live In London

Live album by Judas Priest
- Released: 8 April 2003
- Recorded: 19 December 2001
- Venue: Brixton Academy (London)
- Genre: Heavy metal
- Length: 129:04
- Label: SPV/Steamhammer

Judas Priest chronology
Demolition (2001)	Live In London (2003)	Angel of Retribution (2005)

Alternative Cover
- German Import Cover

Professional ratings
Review scores
Source	Rating
Allmusic link	2.5/5 stars

Live in London is a concert album by British heavy metal band Judas Priest, released on 8 April 2003. It was recorded at Brixton Academy on 19 December 2001, and is the last album the band released with Tim "Ripper" Owens before they reunited with Rob Halford. This contains the full concert in comparison to its DVD counterpart. The U.S. version was delayed until 8 April, three months following the European release with no known information.

== Track listing ==
All music is composed by Rob Halford, K.K. Downing and Glenn Tipton, except where noted.

Disc one
No.	Title	Writer(s)	Length
1.	"Metal Gods"		4:37
2.	"Heading Out to the Highway"		4:13
3.	"Grinder"		4:04
4.	"A Touch of Evil"	Halford, Downing, Tipton, Chris Tsangarides	5:58
5.	"Blood Stained"	Downing, Tipton	5:11
6.	"Victim of Changes"	Al Atkins, Halford, Downing, Tipton	10:08
7.	"The Sentinel"		5:31
8.	"One on One"	Downing, Tipton	6:05
9.	"Running Wild"	Tipton	3:19
10.	"The Ripper"	Tipton	3:31
11.	"Diamonds & Rust" (Joan Baez cover)	Joan Baez	4:13
12.	"Feed on Me"	Tipton	5:25
13.	"The Green Manalishi (With the Two Prong Crown)" (Fleetwood Mac cover)	Peter Green	4:51

Disc two
No.	Title	Writer(s)	Length
1.	"Beyond the Realms of Death"	Halford, Les Binks	7:15
2.	"Burn in Hell"	Downing, Tipton	5:22
3.	"Hell Is Home"	Downing, Tipton	5:47
4.	"Breaking the Law"		2:47
5.	"Desert Plains"		4:25
6.	"You've Got Another Thing Comin'"		5:20
7.	"Turbo Lover"		5:39
8.	"Painkiller"		7:17
9.	"The Hellion"		0:36
10.	"Electric Eye"		3:35
11.	"United"		2:55
12.	"Living After Midnight"		5:13
13.	"Hell Bent for Leather"	Tipton	5:47

== Personnel ==
Judas Priest

- Tim "Ripper" Owens – vocals
- Glenn Tipton – guitars
- K. K. Downing – guitars
- Ian Hill – bass guitar
- Scott Travis – drums

Production

- Engineered live by Will Shapland
- Mixed by Sean Lynch
- Engineered by Ricky Graham
- Album cover by L-Space Design
- Photography by George Chin

== Charts ==
Chart (2003)	Peak position
German Albums (Offizielle Top 100)	54
Japanese Albums (Oricon)	281

== DVD ==
Live in London

Video by Judas Priest
- Released: 23 July 2002
- Recorded: 19 December 2001
- Venue: Brixton Academy (London)
- Genre: Heavy metal
- Length: 97:07
- Label: SPV

Judas Priest chronology
Live in London (2002)	Electric Eye (2003)

Live in London is a DVD, released on 23 July 2002 by SPV. It was recorded live on 19 December 2001 at the Brixton Academy in London.

== Track listing ==
No.	Title	Length
1.	"Metal Gods"	4:36
2.	"A Touch of Evil"	5:59
3.	"Blood Stained"	5:11
4.	"Victim of Changes"	10:09
5.	"One on One"	6:05
6.	"Running Wild"	3:20
7.	"The Ripper"	3:31
8.	"Diamonds & Rust" (Joan Baez cover)	4:14
9.	"Feed on Me"	5:25
10.	"Burn in Hell"	5:23
11.	"Hell Is Home"	5:47
12.	"Breaking the Law"	2:48
13.	"Desert Plains"	4:26
14.	"Turbo Lover"	5:39
15.	"Painkiller"	7:17
16.	"Electric Eye"	3:20
17.	"United"	2:56
18.	"Living After Midnight"	5:13
19.	"Hell Bent for Leather"	5:48
Total length:		1:37:07

Extras

- Demolition Time
- Soundcheck
- Rare backstage footage
- Interviews
