= Burn in Hell =

Burn in Hell may refer to:

- "Burn in Hell" (Judas Priest song), from Jugulator
- "Burn in Hell" (Twisted Sister song), from Stay Hungry

== See also ==
- Burning Hell, an album by Brainbombs
- Burning Hell, a song by John Lee Hooker from self-titled album.
- The Burning Hell, a 1974 film by the evangelist Estus Pirkle
- The Burning Hell (band), a Canadian indie band
- "Liar Liar (Burn in Hell)", a song by The Used from Lies for the Liars
- "All Burn in Hell", a song by White Lion from Fight to Survive
