= Heading Out to the Highway =

Single by Judas Priest

from the album Point of Entry
- Released: May 1981 (US)
- Recorded: 1981
- Genre: Heavy metal
- Length: 3:47
- Label: Columbia
- Songwriters: Rob Halford; K. K. Downing; Glenn Tipton
- Producer: Tom Allom

Judas Priest singles chronology
| "Don't Go" (1981) | "Heading Out to the Highway" (1981) | "Hot Rockin'" (1981) |

Music video
- "Heading Out to the Highway" on YouTube

"Heading Out to the Highway" is a song by English heavy metal band Judas Priest from their 1981 album Point of Entry. It was released as a single later that year, and was the band's first single to reach the US Mainstream Rock chart, peaking at No. 10.

== Inspiration ==
On the lyrics, singer Rob Halford said,

That's freedom. You've got the wheel and you're not going to let anybody else take your life away from you. You're out there into the great, vast landscape of life, and life is a highway. That's just a correlation between the two sets of things. I think everybody feels like that when they get into a car, especially when they make a journey. It's like you're in some kind of control because you're "in the driver's seat," which is also another expression of being assertive. So, it's just a fun song of freedom and determination.

== Background ==
A live version was included on The Best of Judas Priest: Living After Midnight, which was not endorsed by the band. Other live versions appear on the live albums Priest...Live!, Live in London, the DVD Live at US Festival and the second disc of the 30th Anniversary Edition of the album Turbo. The song was covered by American alternative metal band Stone Sour on their covers EP Meanwhile in Burbank..., and White Wizzard on the limited edition of Over the Top.

== Reception ==
In the United States, the song peaked at number 10 on the Billboard Top Tracks chart.

PopMatters said, "More cynical minds would call this "Living After Midnight Part Two", but it’s actually the superior song, rigidity replaced by a much more relaxed groove, its ebullience a clear reflection of the band’s Ibiza surroundings, where the album was written and recorded. Perfectly suited for summertime listening, it’s nothing but fresh air and optimism, driven by a great opening riff."

== Personnel ==
=== Judas Priest ===
- Rob Halford – vocals
- K. K. Downing – guitars
- Glenn Tipton – guitars
- Ian Hill - bass
- Dave Holland – drums

== Charts ==
| Chart (1981) | Peak position |
|---|---|
| US Mainstream Rock (Billboard) | 10 |
