= Burn in Hell (Judas Priest song) =

Song by Judas Priest

Single by Judas Priest

from the album Jugulator
- Released: 16 October 1997
- Recorded: 1996–1997, Silvermere Studios, Surrey, England
- Genre: Groove metal
- Length: 6:42
- Label: SPV/Steamhammer
- Songwriters: K. K. Downing, Glenn Tipton
- Producers: Glenn Tipton; K. K. Downing; Sean Lynch

Judas Priest singles chronology
"Nightcrawler" (1991)	"Burn in Hell" (1997)	"Bullet Train" (1998)

"Burn in Hell" is a song and the first single to be released by English heavy metal band Judas Priest in 1997 for their 13th studio album Jugulator. The song is about revenge. It is featured on the two live albums '98 Live Meltdown and Live in London, both of which were recorded with Tim "Ripper" Owens. The single is also Judas Priest's first with Owens.

A music video was produced for the song and released in 1997. It was shortened down to a little over four minutes. The video features the band in their stage attire playing the song on a stage with fast camera changes and different lights. On 22 February 1999, it was featured as one of the top five videos on Let It Rock, an alternative/hard rock television program broadcast in Southern California.

== Reception ==
Owens stated publicly that "Burn in Hell" was his favorite new song, and he received consistent reviews for his performances. Rick Baert wrote in The Daily Herald that "Owens really lets loose in 'Burn in Hell,' with a choral rendition that may have cost him a vocal cord or two." Jane Scott wrote in The Plain Dealer that Owens demonstrated his enthusiasm for the song: "He started in a lower pitch, then exploded, winding up with a high shriek. In between, he pumped his fists like a Golden Glover."

While panning the rest of the Jugulator album, The Indianapolis Star called "Burn in Hell" "an intriguing anthem clearly influenced by long-timers Tipton and K. K. Downing...The strength of each band member comes through here, particularly bassist Ian Hill and drummer Scott Travis, who joined in the early '90s."

== Personnel ==
- Tim "Ripper" Owens – vocals
- K. K. Downing – guitars
- Glenn Tipton – guitars
- Ian Hill – bass
- Scott Travis – drums
