= Eilenriedehalle =

Convention center

Coordinates: 52°22′27″N 9°46′5.3″E

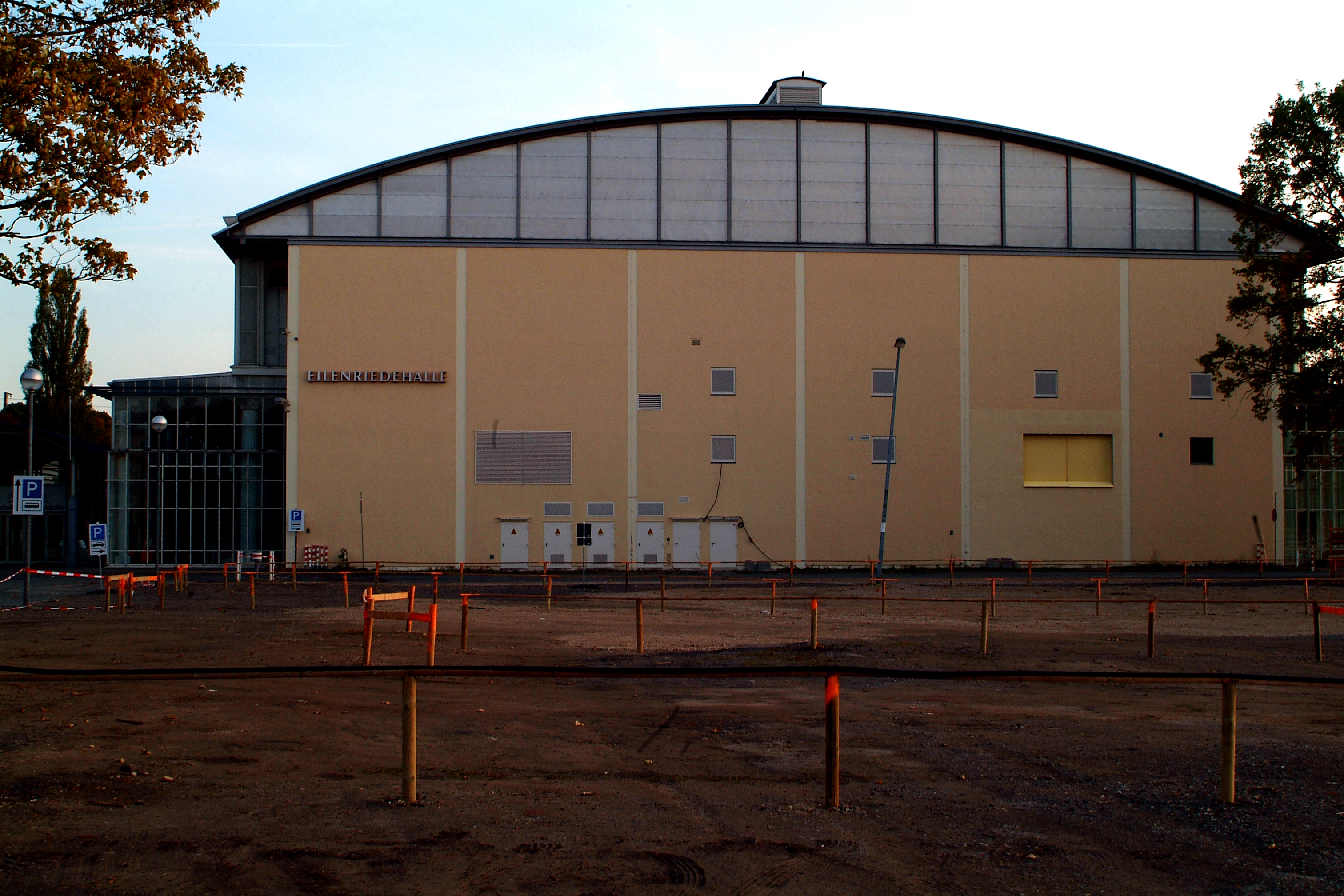
Eilenriedehalle

Eilenriedehalle is an exhibition hall located in Hanover, Germany and part of Hannover Congress Centrum. It was built in 1975 and is used extensively, for conferences, trade fairs and concerts. Without seating Eilenriedehalle can hold up to 7,500 people.

The hall has hosted concerts by many famous artists, spanning many different genres, including Iron Maiden, Whitesnake, Bryan Adams, Dio, Judas Priest, Depeche Mode and Scorpions.

== See also ==
- Niedersachsenhalle
