= Spirits of Fire =

American rock band

- Genres: Hard rock, heavy metal
- Years active: 2017–present
- Label: Frontiers
- Members: Chris Caffery; Steve Di Giorgio; Mark Zonder; Fabio Lione
- Past members: Tim "Ripper" Owens
- Website: Spirits of Fire on Facebook

Spirits of Fire is an American/Italian supergroup consisting of Savatage and Trans-Siberian Orchestra guitarist Chris Caffery, Testament bassist Steve Di Giorgio (ex-Death, ex-Iced Earth), and former Fates Warning drummer Mark Zonder. Tim "Ripper" Owens formerly of Judas Priest and Iced Earth was a founding member of the band before leaving in 2021. The new singer Fabio Lione (Angra, Turilli / Lione Rhapsody, ex-Rhapsody of Fire) was announced 8 December 2021 with their second album Embrace The Unknown that was released on 28 February 2022 via Frontiers Records.

The group was created in July 2017 by Los Angeles–based guitarist and producer Roy Z (Bruce Dickinson, Halford, Tribe of Gypsies).

Their first album, Spirits of Fire, was released on February 22, 2019, via Italian label Frontiers Records. It was produced by Roy Z; keyboards were played by Alessandro Del Vecchio (Hardline).

Their first single, "Light Speed Marching", was released on November 15, 2018.

== Members ==
Current members

- Chris Caffery – guitars, backing vocals (2017–present)
- Steve Di Giorgio – bass (2017–present)
- Mark Zonder – drums (2017–present)
- Fabio Lione – lead vocals (2021–present)

Former members

- Tim "Ripper" Owens – lead vocals (2017–2021)

== Discography ==
- Spirits of Fire (2019)
- Embrace the Unknown (2022)
