= Heinrich-Lades-Halle =

Heinrich-Lades-Halle (formerly Stadthalle Erlangen) is a conference centre located in Erlangen, Germany, which was built between 1969 and 1971. The main hall has a seating capacity of 1,250 people. Notable artists that performed at the venue include Rush, Aerosmith, Def Leppard, AC/DC, Scorpions and Whitesnake.
