= Point of Entry =

Studio album by Judas Priest
- Released: 27 February 1981
- Studios: Ibiza Sound (Ibiza, Spain)
- Genres: Heavy metal; hard rock
- Length: 37:41
- Label: Columbia
- Producers: Tom Allom; Judas Priest

Judas Priest chronology
British Steel (1980)	Point of Entry (1981)	Screaming for Vengeance (1982)

Singles from Point of Entry
- 1. "Don't Go" Released: 13 February 1981; 2. "Hot Rockin'" Released: 10 April 1981; 3. "Heading Out to the Highway" Released: May 1981 (US)

Alternative cover
- Artwork used for original release in North America, Brazil, Australia, Japan, and Hong Kong

Point of Entry is the seventh studio album by English heavy metal band Judas Priest, released on 27 February 1981 by Columbia Records. Following the commercial success of their previous album British Steel (1980), Priest pursued a more radio-friendly direction on Point of Entry. Following the conclusion of the British Steel Tour, the band began work on their next project. By this time, the band possessed sufficient funds to fly all their equipment to the state-of-the-art Ibiza Studios in Spain. This gave Point of Entry a louder, stronger, more "live" sound than previous Judas Priest albums.

== Promotion ==
Three singles were released from the album: "Heading Out to the Highway", "Don't Go" and "Hot Rockin'", all of which had accompanying music videos. The song "Heading Out to the Highway" has been a staple in live shows since its release, "Desert Plains" was regularly played throughout the 1980s and in 2002 and "Hot Rockin'" was returned to the setlist for the 2005 Reunited Tour, where Priest also played "Solar Angels" on rare occasions. On the World Wide Blitz Tour of 1981 supporting Point of Entry, "Solar Angels" had been the opening song of every show, while "Troubleshooter" was also performed on parts of the supporting tour. On the contrary, five songs from the album – "Don't Go", "Turning Circles", "You Say Yes", "All the Way" and "On the Run" – have never been performed live.

== Cover art ==
The European distribution of the album features "an intriguing and colourful sort of futuristic metal wing over a horizon shot" designed by Roslav Szaybo, who had done all of the band's CBS albums to date. The cover featured on the Canada, USA, Australasia, Brazil, Hong Kong and Japan markets, however, was designed by Columbia Record's John Berg, and instead depicts continuous stationery paper to simulate the line in the middle of the road with white cardboard boxes on the back. "The sleeve was awful," guitarist Glen Tipton said of the covers, "and we've got to blame management for that because they didn't shop around enough to get one that was suitable. The American cover was different, but that turned out to be even worse!'" The latter version was once again used for the 2001 remaster of the album.

The American artwork also saw the introduction of the extruded '3D' Judas Priest logo, which would be used up to Turbo.

== Reissues ==
The album was remastered in 2001, with two bonus tracks added, a live version of "Desert Plains" and "Thunder Road", a track from the Ram It Down sessions.

In the booklet of the Remastered CD, the band states:

Recorded on the island of Ibiza with multiple distractions, glorious sunshine, and extremely low cost alcohol, this album was regarded with mixed feelings because it was different from what people expected. The album was nearly all spontaneously written and performed in Ibiza - it was an experiment in the sense that before this we had already written the majority of the songs before going into the studio.

== Critical reception ==
Professional ratings
Review scores
Source	Rating
AllMusic	3.5/5 stars
Encyclopedia of Popular Music	3/5 stars

In 2005, Point of Entry was ranked number 352 in Rock Hard magazine's book The 500 Greatest Rock & Metal Albums of All Time. In the 2007 book Metal: The Definitive Guide, author Garry Sharpe-Young wrote that the album consists of "radio-friendly fillers." Moreover, Sharpe-Young called the original British artwork "bland" and subsequent American alternative artwork "an even worse compromise."

Opinions about the album from within the band were mixed. Bassist Ian Hill explained, "It came across… people think it's just a commercial album. And it's not, there are some good songs in there. And I think it's overlooked.". In a Louder article, it is noted that "Halford admits to being "dismayed" by the reaction it received." In the same Louder article, K.K. Downing takes on a more mixed perspective, "People don't understand how pressurised we were by the label, either to do covers or make hits", he says. "With that album, we gave them what they wanted." He cites the album as the worst he made with the band, "But then again there are some great songs on that one. That's so, so hard to answer."

== Track listing ==
All tracks are written by Glenn Tipton, Rob Halford and K. K. Downing, except where noted.

Side one
No.	Title	Length
1.	"Heading Out to the Highway"	3:47
2.	"Don't Go"	3:18
3.	"Hot Rockin'"	3:17
4.	"Turning Circles"	3:42
5.	"Desert Plains"	4:36

Side two
No.	Title	Length
6.	"Solar Angels"	4:04
7.	"You Say Yes"	3:29
8.	"All the Way"	3:42
9.	"Troubleshooter"	3:59
10.	"On the Run"	3:47
Total length:		37:41

2001 bonus tracks
No.	Title	Writer(s)	Length
11.	"Thunder Road" (Recorded during the 1988 Ram It Down sessions)	Glenn Tipton and Rob Halford	5:12
12.	"Desert Plains" (Live at Kiel Auditorium, St. Louis, Missouri; 23 May 1986)		5:03
Total length:			47:56

== Personnel ==
Judas Priest

- Rob Halford – vocals
- K. K. Downing – guitars
- Glenn Tipton – guitars
- Ian Hill – bass guitar
- Dave Holland – drums

Production

- Produced by Tom Allom and Judas Priest
- Engineered by Louis Austin
- Mixed by Tom Allom
- Mastered by Ray Staff
- UK cover design by Rosław Szaybo
- US cover design by John Berg, photography by Art Kane

== Charts ==
=== Weekly charts ===
Chart (1981)	Peak position
Canada Top Albums/CDs (RPM)	42
Finnish Albums (The Official Finnish Charts)	18
German Albums (Offizielle Top 100)	19
Norwegian Albums (VG-lista)	32
Swedish Albums (Sverigetopplistan)	14
UK Albums (Official Charts)	14
US Billboard 200	39

=== Year-end charts ===
Chart (1981)	Position
US Billboard 200	94

== Certifications ==
Region	Certification	Certified units/sales
United Kingdom (BPI)	Silver	60,000^{^}
United States (RIAA)	Gold	500,000^{^}
^{^} Shipments figures based on certification alone.
