= Niedersachsenhalle =

Coordinates: 52°22′30″N 9°46′7″E

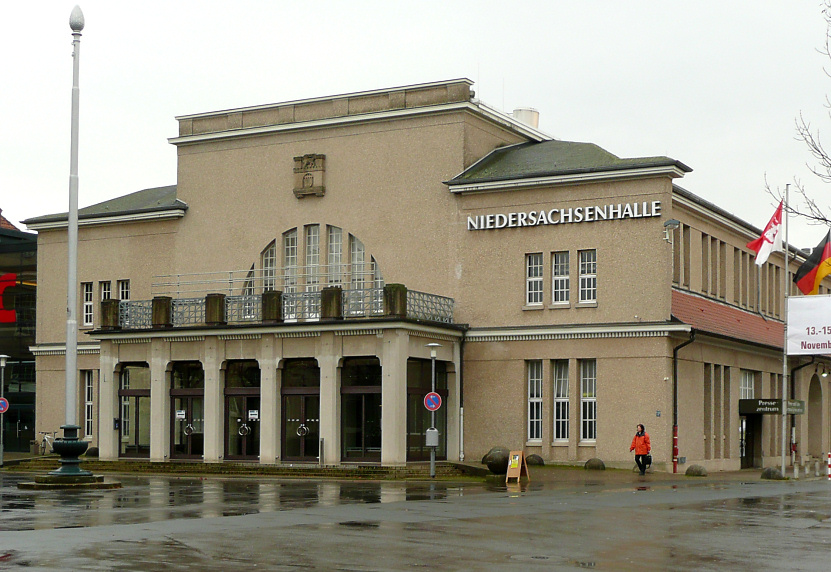
Niedersachsenhalle

Niedersachsenhalle is an exhibition hall located in Hanover, Germany and part of Hannover Congress Centrum. It covers an area of 1,627 m^{2} and has a seating capacity of 1,512 people. It is used for events such as trade fairs and concerts. Notable past performers include Pink Floyd, Iron Maiden, Metallica, Rory Gallagher, AC/DC, Frank Zappa, and many others.

== See also ==
- Eilenriedehalle
