= Jugulator =

- Cover art by Mark Wilkinson

Studio album by Judas Priest
- Released: 16 October 1997
- Recorded: 1996–1997
- Studios: Silvermere, Surrey, England
- Genres: Heavy metal; groove metal; thrash metal
- Length: 58:06
- Label: SPV
- Producer: Glenn Tipton

Judas Priest chronology
Painkiller (1990)	Jugulator (1997)	The Best of Judas Priest: Living After Midnight (1997)

Singles from Jugulator
- 1. "Burn in Hell" Released: 16 October 1997; 2. "Bullet Train" Released: 28 March 1998

Professional ratings
Review scores
Source	Rating
AllMusic	2/5 stars
Collector's Guide to Heavy Metal	5/10
Kerrang!	2/5 stars

Jugulator is the thirteenth studio album by English heavy metal band Judas Priest. It was released in Japan on 16 October 1997 and the rest of the world on 28 October 1997, by German record label SPV. It was their first studio album since Painkiller in 1990 and the first of two studio albums to include lead vocalist Tim "Ripper" Owens, replacing Rob Halford who left the band in 1992.

Jugulator is the only Judas Priest album that has never been released on any major digital media website, due to the bankruptcy of the record label and complicated rights issues.

The album was reissued as part of the band's limited edition 50 Heavy Metal Years of Music box-set, released on October 2021, through Sony Music Entertainment and Legacy Recordings.

== Lyrical content ==
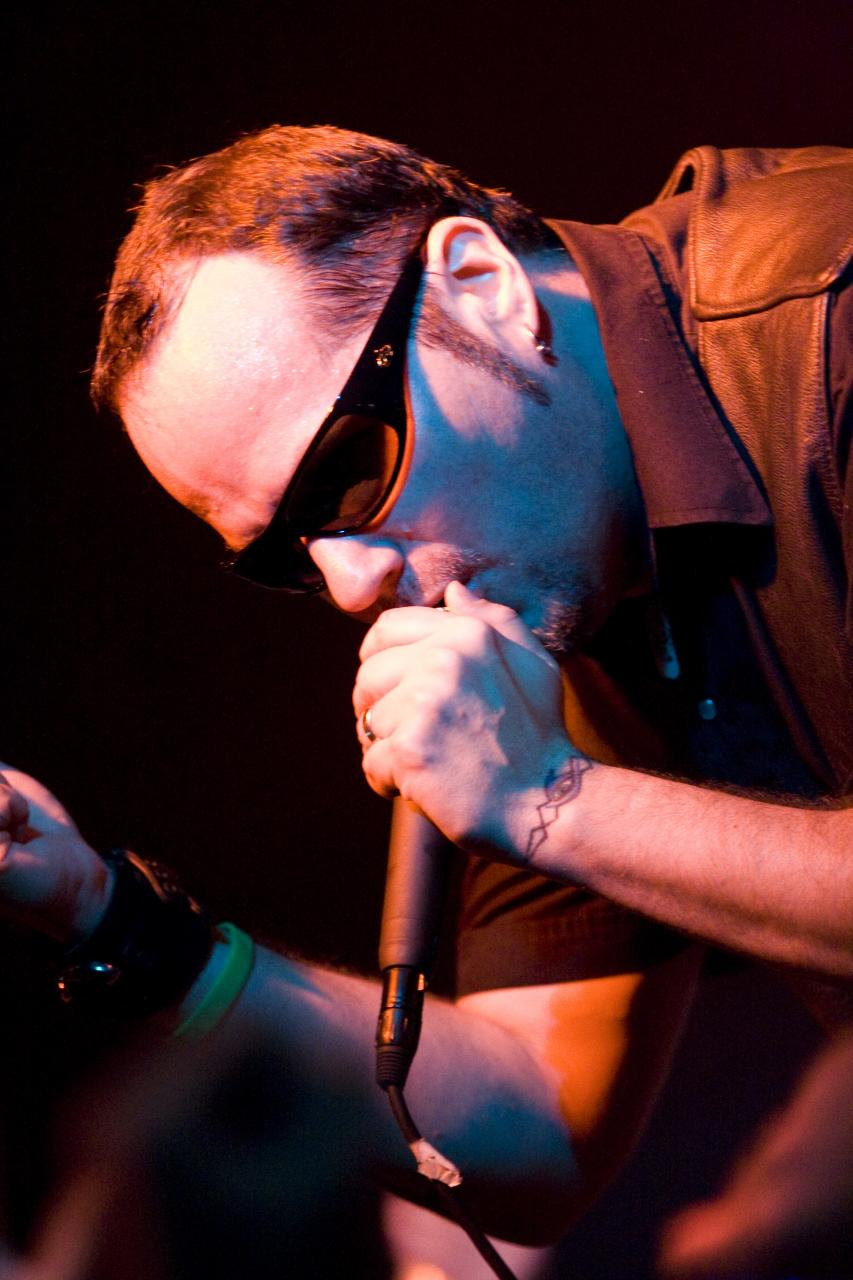
This was the band's first album with vocalist Tim "Ripper" Owens.

The lyrics dealt with darker themes than previous releases, including the eponymous mechanized demon which disembowels its prey, and the end of the world in the song "Cathedral Spires". The guitars were also tuned down as low as C# and C, making a shift from the speed metal and traditional heavy metal elements of Painkiller to a more thrash metal-oriented sound.

"Brain Dead" is written from the perspective of a man who, after a tragedy, has lost the ability to move and speak and is therefore trapped in his mind, having been placed on life support. The footnote in the CD booklet for this song reads "We all have sympathy for those left to care and despair for victims of tragedy but what of the victim himself—trapped inside his body a coffin—unable to move a muscle or blink an eye but aware of the living hell he's enduring and unable to bring it to an end—a man not even a shadow of his former self—a man who wants to be remembered for what he was—not forgotten because of what he has become."

== Reception ==
Reaction to the album was divided among those who enjoyed it on its own terms, those who liked the music but would prefer if Halford had sung it, and those who disliked it on all counts. Glenn Tipton defended the musical changes: "You must remember that two albums went missing between 1990 and Jugulator. To us, it's not the huge leap some people see it as." Tim "Ripper" Owens opines that Jugulator is a better album than 2008's Nostradamus.

"Some people felt there wasn't enough melody on Jugulator," remarked Tipton, "but we just weren't feeling very melodic at the time."

In 2018, Owens pledged to re-record this album and its follow-up Demolition as he feels that his era of the band has "been erased". Ever since Rob Halford rejoined the band, songs from both albums have been left off the band's concert setlists, although Halford stated that he is not opposed to performing the songs live.

== Promotion ==
A music video was shot for the song "Burn in Hell", though over two minutes of the song was removed in the final video. "Jugulator" and "Blood Stained" were also included on Judas Priest's box set Metalogy.

== Awards and nominations ==
"Bullet Train" was nominated for a Grammy Award for Best Metal Performance in 1999.

== Track listing ==
All lyrics are written by Glenn Tipton; all music is composed by Tipton and K. K. Downing.

No.	Title	Length
1.	"Jugulator"	5:50
2.	"Blood Stained"	5:26
3.	"Dead Meat"	4:44
4.	"Death Row"	5:04
5.	"Decapitate"	4:39
6.	"Burn in Hell"	6:42
7.	"Brain Dead"	5:24
8.	"Abductors"	5:49
9.	"Bullet Train"	5:11
10.	"Cathedral Spires"	9:17
Total length:		58:06

== Personnel ==
Judas Priest

- Tim "Ripper" Owens – vocals
- K. K. Downing – guitars
- Glenn Tipton – guitars
- Ian Hill – bass
- Scott Travis – drums

Production

- Glenn Tipton – production
- K. K. Downing – production
- Sean Lynch – production
- Recorded and mixed at Silvermere Studios
- Mastered at Whitfield Street Studios
- Mark Wilkinson – cover illustration
- Andie Airfix at Satori – design
- Ross Halfin – photography

== Charts ==
Chart (1997)	Peak position
Austrian Albums (Ö3 Austria)	34
Canada Top Albums/CDs (RPM)	87
Finnish Albums (Suomen virallinen lista)	24
German Albums (Offizielle Top 100)	9
Japanese Albums (Oricon)	9
Spanish Albums (AFYVE)	20
Swedish Albums (Sverigetopplistan)	33
Swiss Albums (Schweizer Hitparade)	43
UK Independent Albums (Official Charts)	32
UK Rock & Metal Albums (Official Charts)	14
US Billboard 200	82
