= Tim "Ripper" Owens =

American heavy metal singer (born 1967)

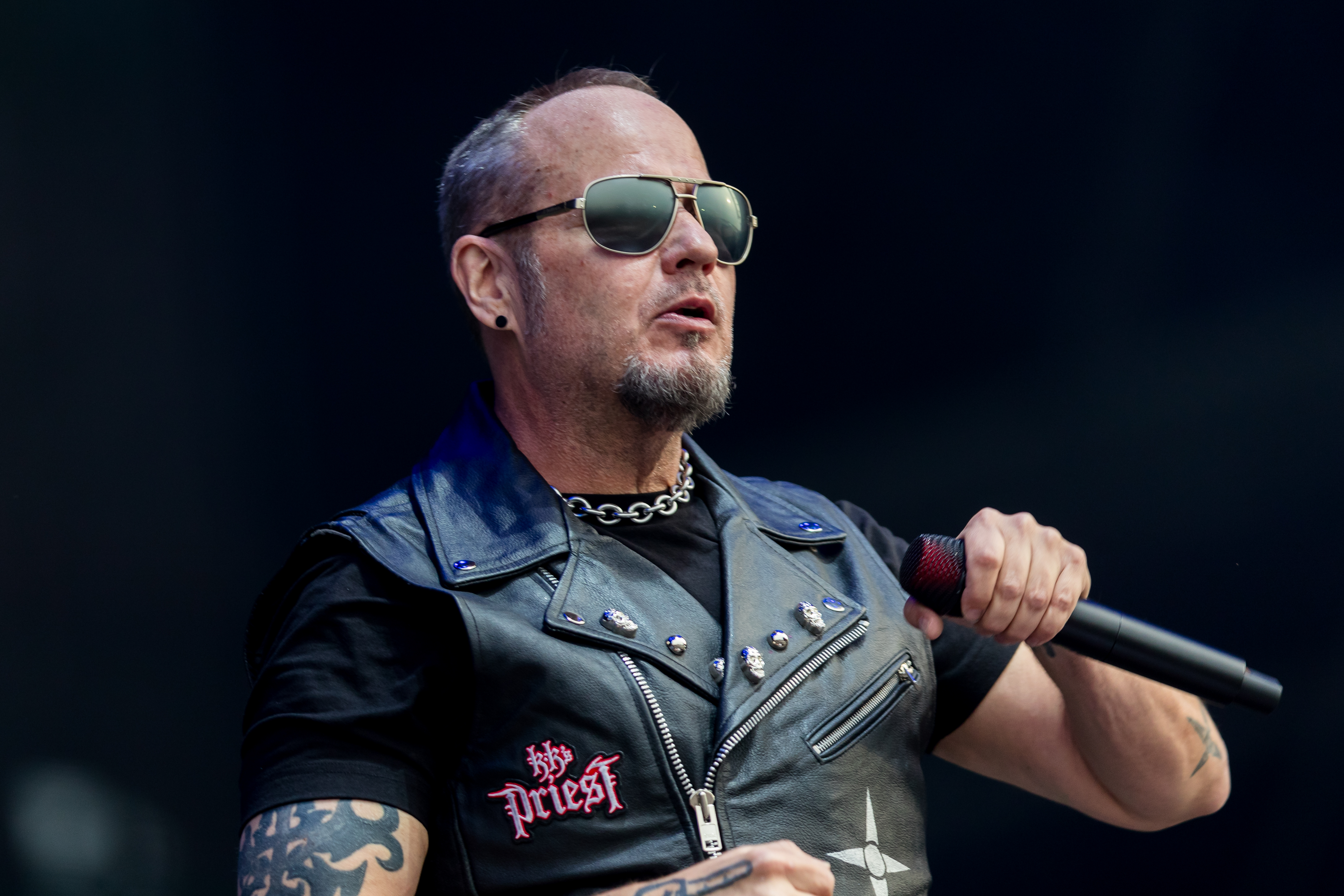
- Owens performing in 2024

Background information
- Born: Timothy S. Owens; September 13, 1967 (age 59); Akron, Ohio, U.S.
- Genre: Heavy metal
- Occupations: Singer; songwriter
- Years active: 1990–present
- Member of: DIO Disciples; Charred Walls of the Damned; KK's Priest; A New Revenge; The Three Tremors
- Formerly of: Yngwie Malmsteen; Beyond Fear; Winter's Bane; Iced Earth; Judas Priest; Spirits of Fire; Hail!
- Website: timripperowens.com

Timothy S. "Ripper" Owens (born September 13, 1967) is an American heavy metal singer who currently performs with KK's Priest, Spirits of Fire, the Three Tremors and "The Tim Ripper Monster Energy Big Band". He first gained attention as the lead singer of Judas Priest and then Iced Earth. He was given the nickname "Ripper" from his Judas Priest audition. Like his predecessor in Judas Priest, Owens has been noted for his powerful and wide ranging operatic vocal style.

In 2020, Owens was announced as the frontman for the band KK's Priest, which also features former Judas Priest member KK Downing.

== Early life ==
Owens was born in Akron, Ohio, on September 13, 1967. He graduated from Kenmore High School in 1985.

== Career ==
=== Brainicide and Winter's Bane/British Steel ===
Owens began his musical career as the singer for Brainicide, a thrash metal band based in his home town of Akron, Ohio that had also been known as Dammage, Inc. He recorded 3 demo tapes with them before the band split in 1989. Prior to joining Judas Priest in 1996, Owens fronted a band called Winter's Bane, with whom he recorded an album called Heart of a Killer in 1993. The band also featured as the Judas Priest tribute band British Steel.

=== Judas Priest ===
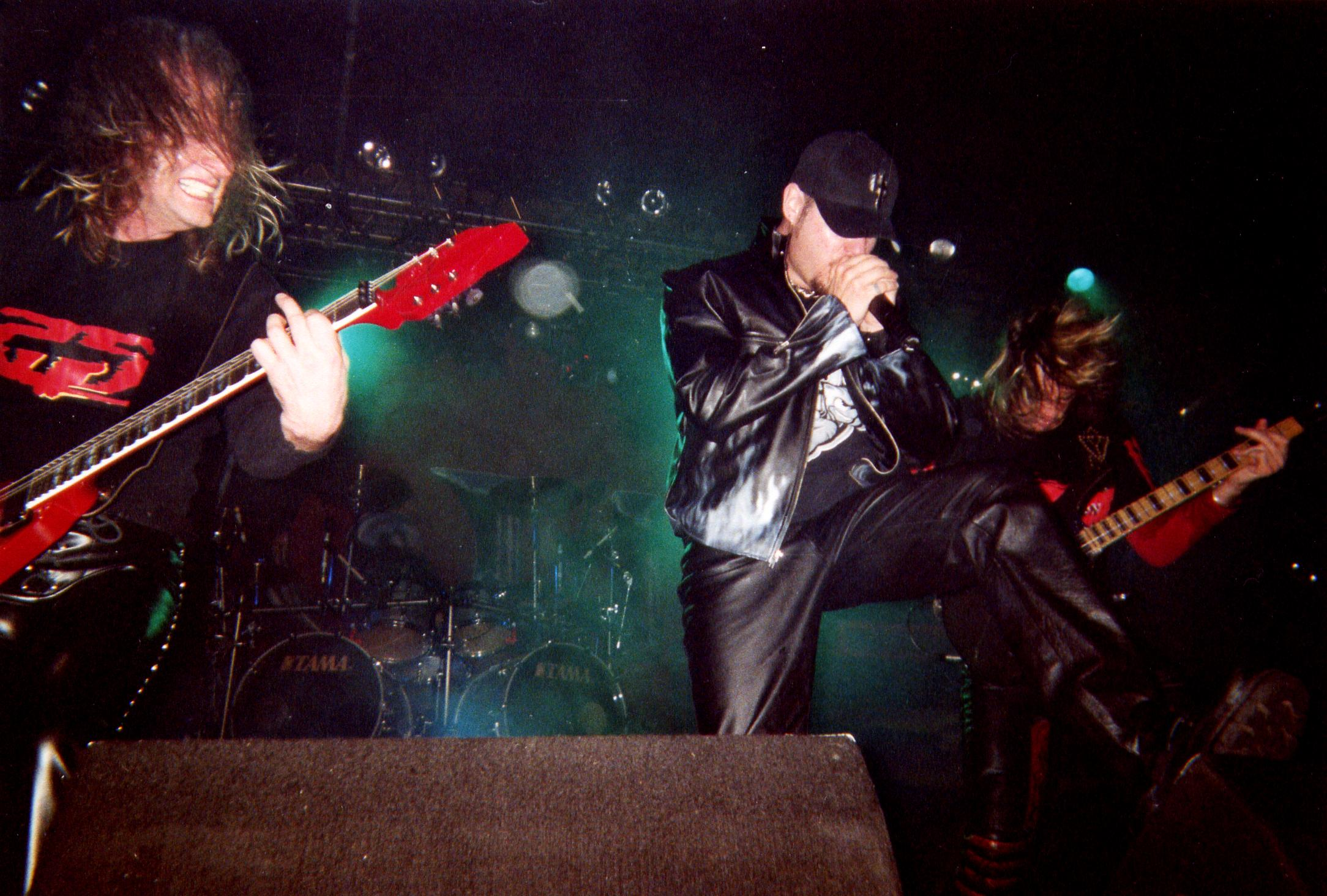
Owens (center) with Judas Priest in 2002

Owens made headlines in 1996 when he was recruited by Judas Priest as their lead singer, replacing Rob Halford. Owens recorded two studio albums with the band and also featured on two live albums and a DVD release. He also co-wrote the song, "What's My Name?", which was a bonus track on Demolition. With Judas Priest, he was nominated once for the Grammy Award for Best Metal Performance in 1999, with the song "Bullet Train" from the album Jugulator.

==== Rock Star ====
The 2001 film Rock Star is about a tribute band singer who is asked to join the band he has tried to imitate and was loosely based on Owens' career. Judas Priest disavowed the movie after they were denied creative control in the screenplay and script. Owens said of the movie, "They fabricated things and decided to pull away from my story and make their own because I guess mine was too normal. There's no telling what they put in there. If I could sue, I would."

=== Iced Earth and Yngwie Malmsteen's Rising Force ===
Judas Priest reunited with Rob Halford in 2003. Owens joined Iced Earth in the same year and their first album with Owens, The Glorious Burden, came out in early 2004. In 2006, Owens also reunited with his former Winter's Bane colleague Dennis Hayes in a band called Beyond Fear. The self-titled debut album from his new band was released in May of that year. Hayes would join Iced Earth as well in 2007 after bassist James "Bo" Wallace left due to family health issues. Owens' stay in Iced Earth ended in December 2007, when guitarist Jon Schaffer announced that Owens would be leaving the band.

On February 26, 2008, it was announced that Owens would be the new lead singer for Yngwie Malmsteen's Rising Force, replacing Doogie White. Owens quit Malmsteen's band in 2012, saying there were conflicts in show dates between his solo band and Yngwie's touring, but that he would be open to the possibility of working with him again.

In May 2009, Owens released his first solo album, Play My Game. The album featured, among others, David Ellefson, Simon Wright and Bruce Kulick. A European tour followed in 2010, accompanied by musicians Anders Buaas (guitar), Jon Vegard Naess (guitar), Are Gogstad (bass), and Henrik "Rick" Hagan (drums).

=== Charred Walls of the Damned, HAIL! and Dio Disciples ===
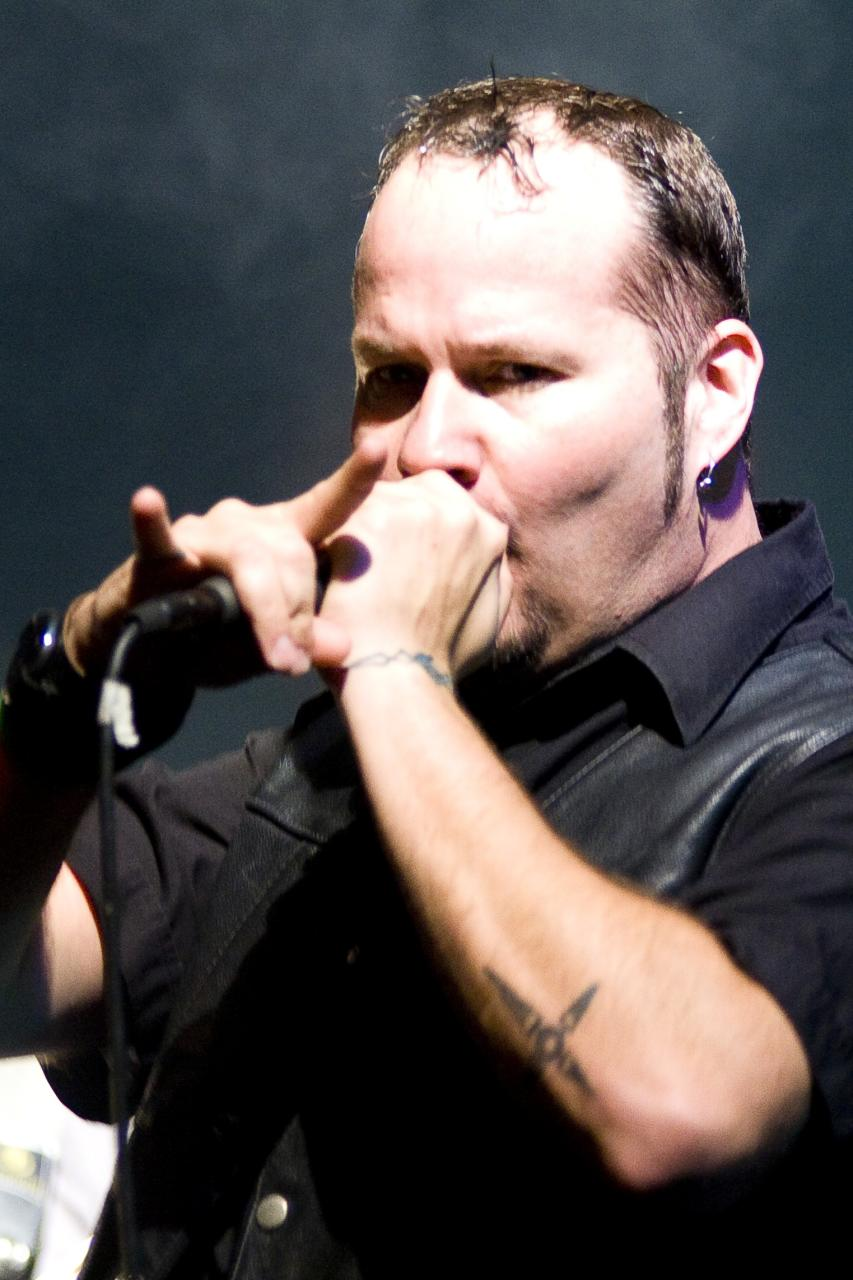
Owens in 2009

Owens also fronted Charred Walls of the Damned, a band founded in 2009 by Richard Christy, and featured former members of Iced Earth, Steve Di Giorgio (bass guitar) and Jason Suecof (lead guitar). The band's debut self-titled album was released on February 2, 2010 through Metal Blade Records.

Owens is also a member of a cover band called HAIL!. HAIL!'s rotating cast of members include Owens, Andreas Kisser, Paul Bostaph, David Ellefson, Mike Portnoy, Jimmy DeGrasso, and Roy Mayorga. Owens, DeGrasso, Ellefson, and Kisser formed the band in late 2008. They toured Europe in 2009, June 2010, and came together to perform at a benefit for Deftones bassist Chi Cheng in 2010. The lineup consisted of Owens, Portnoy, Mark Anthony of the Letter Black, Phil Demmel of Machine Head, and Ellefson. HAIL! is on their second European tour with the lineup Andreas Kisser, Owens, Paul Bostaph, and James LoMenzo.

In early 2011, Owens also joined Dio Disciples, which features former Dio members.

=== Other projects ===
Other music projects of Owens include Project Rock with Keri Kelli, Rudy Sarzo, James Kottak, and Teddy Zig Zag.

Owens owned "Ripper's Rock House", a sports eatery, restaurant and entertainment venue in Akron, Ohio. In August 2015, Bar Rescue filmed and transformed the bar into "Tim Owens' Traveler's Tavern". The venue closed permanently in September 2016.

He was also the owner of "Ripper Owens Tap House", the predecessor to "Ripper's Rock House", in Akron's Firestone Park neighborhood.

In 2015, Owens recorded music for the fictional band Witches' Lips for the heavy metal horror film Hairmetal Shotgun Zombie Massacre: The Movie. He recorded and wrote the lyrics with guitarist Marzi Montazeri of Philip H. Anselmo and The Illegals.

Ted Kirkpatrick, drummer and songwriter for the Christian metal band Tourniquet, announced on July 25, 2018, that Owens would be doing lead vocals for all the songs (except the title track "Gazing at Medusa") on their next album. The album, Gazing at Medusa, was released on October 16, 2018.

During the late 1990s and early 2000s, Owens was part of a Grunge themed tribute band called Seattle, playing covers of Nirvana, Soundgarden, Alice in Chains, Pearl Jam, and other Grunge bands of the era.

In December 2022, Owens released a solo album under the name 'Ripper', titled Return to Death Row.

In 2024, Owens once again sang on Leviathan Project's album, MCMLXXXII, which also featured Vinny Appice on drums, Bobby Koelble (Death) on lead guitar and Tommy Kay (Britny Fox) on guitar.

== Discography ==
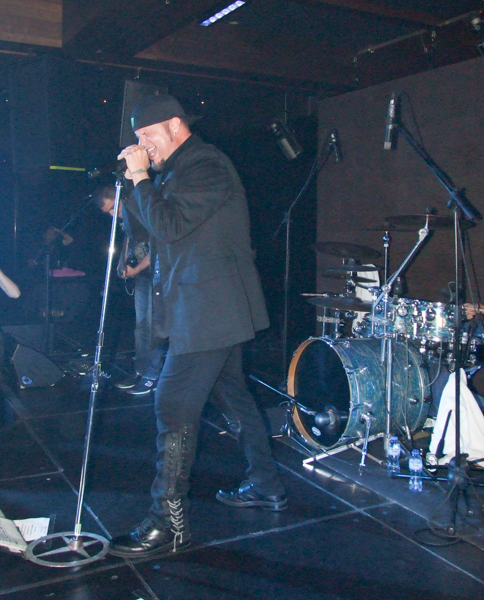
Owens performing in 2016

=== Solo ===
- Play My Game (2009)
- Return to Death Row (EP) (2022)

=== With Brainicide ===
- Brutal Mentality K7 Demo (1990)

=== With Winter's Bane ===
- Heart of a Killer (1993)

=== With Judas Priest ===
Studio Albums

- Jugulator (1997)
- Demolition (2001)

Live Albums

- '98 Live Meltdown (1998)
- Live in London (2003)

=== With Iced Earth ===
- The Glorious Burden (2004)
- Overture of the Wicked (EP) (2007)
- Framing Armageddon (Something Wicked Part 1) (2007)

=== With Beyond Fear ===
- Beyond Fear (2006)

=== With Yngwie Malmsteen's Rising Force ===
- Perpetual Flame (2008)
- Relentless (2010)

=== With Charred Walls of the Damned ===
- Charred Walls of the Damned (2010)
- Cold Winds on Timeless Days (2011)
- Creatures Watching Over the Dead (2016)

=== With the Three Tremors ===
- The Three Tremors (2019)
- Guardians of the Void (2021)

=== With Spirits of Fire ===
- Spirits of Fire (2019)

=== With A New Revenge ===
- Enemies & Lovers (2019)

=== With Leviathan Project ===
- It's Their World (Ep) (2021)
- Edge of Time (Ep) (2021)
- Sound of Galaxies (2021)
- Phantoms Vol.1 (Ep) (2022)
- MCMLXXXII (2024)

=== With KK's Priest ===
- Sermons of the Sinner (2021)
- The Sinner Rides Again (2023)

=== Tribute albums ===
- Kickstart My Heart: A Tribute to Mötley Crüe (song: "Louder than Hell", backing vocals only)
- One Way Street: A Tribute to Aerosmith (song: "Round and Round")
- Michael Schenker - Heavy Hitters (vocals on "War Pigs" by Black Sabbath)
- Numbers from the Beast: An All Star Salute to Iron Maiden (song: "Flight of Icarus")
- Bat Head Soup: A Tribute to Ozzy (song: "Mr. Crowley")
- Butchering the Beatles: A Headbashing Tribute (song: "Hey Jude")
- Hell Bent Forever: A Tribute to Judas Priest (song: "Exciter")
- Sin-Atra (song: "Witchcraft")
- Ronnie James Dio – This Is Your Life (Japanese edition) (song: "Stand Up and Shout (Live)")
- Immortal Randy Rhoads – The Ultimate Tribute Album (2015) (8 of 11 songs)
- The Doom in Us All - A Tribute to Black Sabbath (song: "Children of the Grave")

=== Other appearances ===
- Spawn - Round 2 (production, 1998)
- Soulbender - Demo (2008)
- Screamking - The Indomitable Spirit / Trail of Death (Platinum Dungeon LLC 2021)
- Ellefson, Bittner, Grigsby & Owens - Leave It Alone (memorial track for Dimebag Darrell, iTunes release) (2008)
- Roadrunner United - The Concert (DVD, live, 2008) - vocals on "Curse of the Pharaohs" by Mercyful Fate, "Abigail" by King Diamond, and "Allison Hell" by Annihilator
- We Wish You a Metal Xmas and a Headbanging New Year - vocals on "Santa Claus Is Back in Town" by Elvis Presley
- Avantasia - The Wicked Symphony (2010)
- The Claymore - Damnation Reigns (2010) - vocals on "Behind Enemy Lines"
- Memorain - Evolution (2011)
- Ralf Scheepers - Scheepers (2011) - vocals on "Remission of Sin"
- Desdemon - Through the Gates (2011) - vocals on "The Burning Martyr"
- Infinita Symphonia - A Mind's Chronicle (2011)
- Wolfpakk - Wolfpakk (2011) - vocals on "Wolfony"
- Absolute Power - Absolute Power (2011)
- SoulSpell - Hollow's Gathering (2012)
- T&N - Slave to the Empire (2012) - vocals on "Kiss of Death"
- Helker - Somewhere in the Circle (2013) – additional vocals on track 4 "Begging for Forgivenes"
- Maegi - Skies Fall (2013)
- Marius Danielsen - The Legend of Valley Doom Part 1 (2014)
- SoulSpell - We Got the Right (Helloween 30 Years Tribute) (2015)
- Carthagods - Carthagods (2015) - vocals on "My Favourite Disguise"
- Operation: Mindcrime - Resurrection (2015) - vocals on "Taking on the World"
- Trick or Treat - Rabbits' Hill Pt. 2 - vocals on "They Must Die"
- Europica - Part One (2017) - vocals on "The Patriot" and "Unsounded Crosses"
- Metal Allegiance - Metal Allegiance (2016) - co-lead vocals on "We Rock"
- Trigger Pig - Sands of Time (Single, 2017) - lead vocals
- Jano Baghoumian - "The End of Prance" (symphonic poem album, 2018) - lead vocals
- Tourniquet - Gazing at Medusa (album, 2018) - lead vocals on all but the title track
- Forsaken Age - Heavy Metal Nightmare (2020) - guest vocals on "Raven's Cry"
- Thousand Oxen Fury - Victory March (2020) - guest vocals on "Sink This Ship, Save My Soul"
- Tourniquet - Gethsemane, (single, 2020)
- Alogia (band) - Semendria (2020) - guest vocals on "Eternal Fight"
- Emerald Rage - The Devil's Warhead (single, 2020) - guest vocals on "The Devil's Warhead"
- Barry Kuzay - The Movers of the World (2021) - lead vocals on "Wyatt's Torch"
- Offensive - Awenasa (2021) - lead vocals on "Blind Ambition"
- Leviathan Project - Sound of Galaxies (2021)
- Engineered Society Project - Digital Soldiers (2021)
- My Own Maker - The Save Word (2021)
- Renegade Angel - Damnation (2021) lead and backing vocals on "Damnation"
- Pyramid - Validity (2021)
- Nergard - Eternal White (2021) - guest vocals on "Now Barely Three"
- Ashes of Ares - Emperors And Fools (2022) - guest vocals on "Monster's Lament"
- Brutality in Buddha - Crank it up from 9 to 11 (2021) – vocals sung by Ted Wray and Tim Ripper Owens
- Seventh Servant - The Tree of Life (2022) – additional vocals on track 6 "Jezebel"
- Thunder Thunder - The Final Vesper (2023)
- Steel Project - Beast Vision (single, 2023)
- Arched Fire - Pestilence (single, 2023)
- Esprit D'Air - The Trooper (single, 2023) - duet vocals sung by Esprit D'Air and Tim "Ripper" Owens
- Stormrazor- The Overture Of The Fallen (single, 2023)
