= The Green Manalishi (With the Two Prong Crown) =

1970 single by Fleetwood Mac

- UK single sleeve, featuring (L–R): Kirwan, Green, Fleetwood, Spencer, McVie

Single by Fleetwood Mac
- B-side: "World in Harmony"
- Released: 15 May 1970
- Recorded: Hollywood, January 1970; De Lane Lea Studios, 14 April 1970
- Genre: Blues rock; psychedelic rock; hard rock
- Length: 4:36
- Label: Reprise (RS27007)
- Songwriter: Peter Green

Fleetwood Mac British singles chronology
"Oh Well" (1969)	"The Green Manalishi (With the Two Prong Crown)" (1970)	"Dragonfly" (1971)

Fleetwood Mac American singles chronology
"Rattlesnake Shake" (1969)	"The Green Manalishi (With the Two Prong Crown)" (1970)	"Jewel Eyed Judy" (1971)

"The Green Manalishi (With the Two Prong Crown)" is a song written by Peter Green and recorded by Fleetwood Mac. It was released as a single in the UK in May 1970 and reached No. 10 on the British charts, a position it occupied for four consecutive weeks, and was the band's last UK top 10 hit until "Tusk" reached No. 6 in 1979. "The Green Manalishi" was the last song Green made with Fleetwood Mac before leaving the band.

== Composition ==
The song was written during Green's final months with the band, at a time when he was using LSD heavily. While there are several theories about the meaning of the title "Green Manalishi", Green always maintained that the song is about money, as represented by the devil. Green was reportedly angered by the other band members' refusal to share their financial gains.

Green has explained that he wrote the song after experiencing a drug-induced dream in which he was visited by a green dog which barked at him from the afterlife. He understood that the dog represented money. "It scared me because I knew the dog had been dead a long time. It was a stray and I was looking after it. But I was dead and had to fight to get back into my body, which I eventually did. When I woke up, the room was really black and I found myself writing the song." Green wrote the lyrics the following day in Richmond Park.

== Recording ==
Fleetwood Mac played "Green Manalishi" live on a few occasions before they began work on the song in the recording studio. They recorded parts of the song in Warner/Reprise Studios, in Hollywood, California, during a break in touring. The band returned to the song on 14 April 1970 at De Lane Lea Studios in London. One of the band's guitarists, Jeremy Spencer, elected not to attend either recording session. Spencer had also been absent for most of the recording sessions for the band's Then Play On album that was released the previous year.

Martin Birch, who served as the producer for these recording sessions, recalled that Green was initially frustrated because he could not get the sound he wanted, but Danny Kirwan reassured him that they would stay in the studio all night until the band achieved a satisfactory take. Green had played the band a demo of "Green Manalishi" and expected the rest of the band to replicate the parts that he had recorded. The band recorded several instruments for "Green Manalishi", including a six-string bass and "lots of drums". They recorded 27 different takes of the song, of which seven were false starts. Three different spools of tape were used to record the song, with take seven on the third spool being designated as the master. Once the master was established, the band commenced with overdubs.

To achieve the guitar tone found on the intro, Birch placed large monitor speakers in an underground concrete car park and captured the guitar sounds emanating from the speakers with microphones at the end of the car park. This technique allowed Birch to attain natural reverb from the acoustics in the car park. Green later said that the session left him exhausted and singled out the recording session for "Green Manalishi" as one of his favourite musical memories. He was also fond of the "shrieking guitars" that he played with Kirwan and had expected the song to reach number one. In a 1997 interview, Green expressed his belief that "'Green Manalishi' was quite good, it was on the way to brilliant, but it should have been a little bit quieter."

== Critical reception ==
In the 16 May 1970 edition of New Musical Express, Derek Johnson said that the song's "ethereal voice wail behind the penetrating guitars and insistent beats" and felt that it "should be the very devil of a hit". That same week, Peter Jones reviewed the song in Record Mirror, saying that it possessed a "heavy, polished-yet-rough overall sound. Good fierce vocal lines, but the basic guitar drive and drum-thud is what makes it tick." A few weeks later, Chris Welch reviewed the song for Melody Maker, saying that it had a "strange, moody sound" with "dramatic and effective" production.

== Live versions ==
Fleetwood Mac began performing the song at the end of 1969, with Green introducing it as "a song about the devil." A 16-minute live version of "The Green Manalishi" was recorded in February 1970, prior to the single's recording in April, but it initially remained unreleased until 1998, when it was issued on the Live in Boston: Remastered album.

Following Green's departure, Fleetwood Mac continued to play the song on a few occasions, including their Live at the Record Plant performance on 15 December 1974, which was recorded for a live-broadcast on KSAN-FM. The band also performed the song soon after Lindsey Buckingham and Stevie Nicks joined. During certain performances of the song, Nicks would join Fleetwood behind his drum set to play congas. On 25 February 2020, Fleetwood performed the song at a tribute concert for Peter Green. ZZ Top's Billy Gibbons handled vocals on the song and Kirk Hammett handled the song's lead guitar and also played the song on the 1959 Les Paul guitar nicknamed Greeny that once belonged to Green.

== World in Harmony ==
The B-side of the single was an instrumental written by Green and Danny Kirwan, titled "World In Harmony". Fleetwood Mac had played the song live on a few occasions starting in January 1970 and briefly attempted to record it during a break in the United States. The band recorded the final version at De Lane Studios, with sessions beginning on 16 April 1970. At the time of the song's recording, "World in Harmony" carried the working title "Danny's One". The only Fleetwood Mac song bearing a Kirwan/Green writing credit, the two had plans to collaborate further on a guitar-driven album, but the project never materialised. Kirwan was responsible for the majority of the composition with the exception of the middle section, which was created by Green. Kirwan gave him a co-writing credit for this contribution.

Similar to the recording sessions for "Green Manalishi", Spencer did not participate in any capacity on "World in Harmony". During the sessions, which took place over two days, Green, McVie, and Kirwan engaged in a disagreement over the intro. Parts of this verbal altercation were captured on an alternate take of "World in Harmony" that later appeared on The Vaudeville Years compilation album in 1998. Of the twelve takes recorded on 16 April, the band completed four of them, with the remaining eight comprising false starts and incomplete takes. Work resumed on "World in Harmony" the following day, which resulted in five additional takes. The band selected take six from the previous day as the master. Green's guitar was assigned to the left channel and Kirwan's was placed on the right; additional guitars were also overdubbed and treated with reverb.

== Personnel ==
- Peter Green – guitar, vocals, six string bass
- Danny Kirwan – guitar
- John McVie – bass guitar
- Mick Fleetwood – drums, gong, maracas

== Chart positions ==
Chart (1969)	Peak position
Belgium (Ultratop 50 Flanders)	16
Belgium (Ultratop 50 Wallonia)	44
Ireland (IRMA)	14
Netherlands (Single Top 100)	6
UK Singles (Official Charts)	10
West Germany (GfK)	16

== Judas Priest version ==
"The Green Manalishi (With the Two Pronged Crown)"

Single by Judas Priest

from the album Hell Bent for Leather
- Released: May 1979
- Recorded: 1978
- Studio: Utopia (London); Basing Street (London); CBS (London)
- Genre: Heavy metal
- Length: 3:23
- Label: Columbia
- Songwriter: Peter Green
- Producers: James Guthrie, Judas Priest

Heavy metal band Judas Priest covered the song on their 1979 album Hell Bent for Leather (the American version of Killing Machine). The first worldwide release was on the band's live album, Unleashed in the East, released later that year. The band performed it on Live Aid at JFK Stadium, Pennsylvania in 1985.

Adrien Begrand of PopMatters said the cover "succeeded in such a way that the Priest version is now far more famous than the original. They make it their own, accelerating the pace just enough to achieve a better balance of force and menace, and the groove created by drummer Les Binks cinches it. Priest’s towering version is nevertheless an all-time heavy metal classic."

A re-recording of the song, subtitled the '98 version, was included as one of the B-sides to the single "Bullet Train," and later as a bonus track on the German and Australian versions of the band’s 2001 album Demolition.

=== Personnel ===
Judas Priest

- Rob Halford - vocals
- Glenn Tipton - guitars
- K. K. Downing - guitars
- Ian Hill - bass
- Les Binks - drums
