= Living After Midnight =

1980 single by Judas Priest

Single by Judas Priest

from the album British Steel
- Released: 21 March 1980
- Recorded: January–February 1980; Startling Studios; Ascot, Berkshire
- Genre: Heavy metal; pop metal
- Length: 3:31
- Label: Columbia
- Songwriters: Rob Halford; K. K. Downing; Glenn Tipton
- Producer: Tom Allom

Judas Priest singles chronology
"Evening Star" (1979)	"Living After Midnight" (1980)	"Breaking the Law" (1980)

Music video
- "Living After Midnight" on YouTube

"Living After Midnight" is a song by English heavy metal band Judas Priest. It was originally featured on their 1980 album British Steel, which was their first gold album in the United States selling more than 500,000 copies (and eventually went platinum for selling at least one million). The song speaks to the hedonistic, rebellious spirit of the late 1970s and early 1980s, and is among the band's most popular songs.

== Background ==
The song title came about when Glenn Tipton awakened Rob Halford with his loud guitar playing at 4 AM, during the band's stay at Tittenhurst Park to record British Steel in 1980. Halford commented to Tipton that he was "really living after midnight", and Tipton replied that Halford's comment was a great title for the song he was working on.

== Video ==
The music video, directed by Julien Temple and shot live at the Sheffield City Hall, begins with drummer Dave Holland playing an invisible drum kit. During the guitar solo, fans on the front row play along with their cardboard guitars (which were the prominent fan symbols of the new wave of British heavy metal movement).

== Reception ==
PopMatters said, "'Living After Midnight' still sticks in the craws of some fuddy-duddy metal old-timers, but as trite as this little party anthem is, its hook is irresistible and glorious, the sound of a band learning that it never hurts to have a little fun once in a while. The song is oddly clean-cut, hedonism rendered a little innocent, and kind of sweet." BBC agreed it, "epitomised the new breed of radio friendly metal".

In 2012, Loudwire ranked the song number five on its list of the 10 greatest Judas Priest songs, calling it, "Perhaps the greatest Judas Priest song to sing along with," and in 2019, Louder Sound ranked the song number three on its list of the 50 greatest Judas Priest songs.

== Cover versions ==
This song has been covered by The Donnas on their album The Donnas Turn 21 (2001), by Saul Blanch on the tribute album Acero Argentino: Tributo a Judas Priest (2006), by L.A. Guns on Hell Bent Forever: A Tribute to Judas Priest (2008) and by Iron Savior as a bonus track on the Japanese release of their Condition Red (2002) album.

It was covered by Disturbed on the Tribute to British Steel (2010) CD by Metal Hammer UK music magazine, incorporating the opening drum salvo from Judas Priest's 1990 song "Painkiller". It also appears as one of the bonus songs available with some distributions of Disturbed's album Asylum (2010), and also features on their B-sides compilation album The Lost Children (2011).

In 1981, Italian rock singer Vasco Rossi adapted the riff of "Living After Midnight" for his song "Dimentichiamoci questa città", included in his fourth studio album Siamo solo noi; the song became a success in Italy and Rossi used it for his first promotional video.

== Charts ==
Chart (1980)	Peak position
Australian Singles (Kent Music Report)	91
UK Singles (OCC)	12

== Personnel ==
- Rob Halford – vocals
- Glenn Tipton – lead guitar
- K. K. Downing – rhythm guitar
- Ian Hill – bass
- Dave Holland – drums
