= Ian Hill =

English bassist, member of Judas Priest

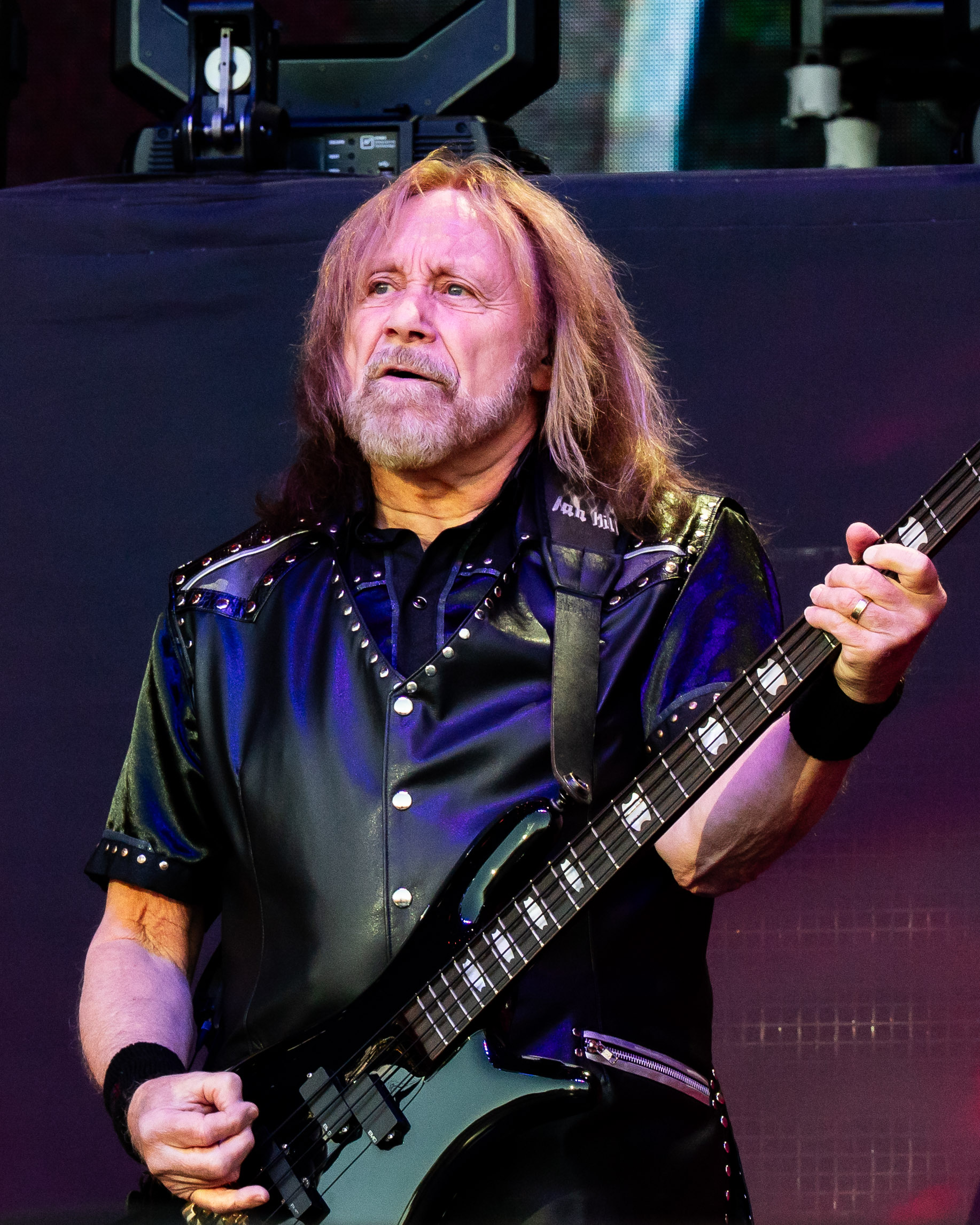
- Hill performing in 2024

Background information
- Born: Ian Frank Hill; 20 January 1952 (age 74); West Bromwich, England
- Genre: Heavy metal
- Occupation: Bassist
- Years active: 1969–2026
- Formerly of: Judas Priest

Ian Frank Hill (born 20 January 1952) is an English retired musician, known as the former bassist of the heavy metal band Judas Priest, which he joined in 1970. Along with lead guitarist Glenn Tipton, he is one of only two members who have appeared on all of the band's studio albums. Though not an original member, Hill was the longest-serving member of Judas Priest prior to his departure and subsequent retirement in 2026.

== Judas Priest ==
In 1970, together with schoolmate K. K. Downing, Hill joined heavy metal band Judas Priest. He played bass in the band and was the longest-serving member of the band, following Downing's departure in 2011 and until Hill's retirement in 2026.

During the early years of the band, he played bass by finger-picking, but since the album Killing Machine he has played with a pick.

Hill is credited with playing bass on all of Judas Priest's albums, but on Painkiller his playing was double-tracked with Don Airey's bass on a Minimoog synthesizer. Hill is responsible for bringing Rob Halford into Judas Priest. The two met while Hill was dating Halford's sister and mentioned that he needed a new vocalist for his band. Halford accepted, leaving his previous band Hiroshima, and brought along drummer John Hinch, who would later be dropped by the band after their debut, Rocka Rolla, due to "musical inadequacy", according to Judas Priest's website.

When Hill was asked about his reaction to the 2001 film Rock Star, which was originally inspired by the real-life story of Tim "Ripper" Owens, a singer in a Judas Priest tribute band who was chosen to replace singer Rob Halford when he left the band, in an interview with PopMatters magazine, Hill responded "Well, it was a true work of fiction, you know? When we heard about the production company were going to make a movie based, as far as we knew, about Ripper joining the band we offered our help. We said 'If there's anything you want to know, talk to us at the time.' And certainly our communication was cut off and that was it and they went off on their own tangent." Hill added "I mean, I quite enjoyed the movie. [laughs] It was entertaining, you know?" Hill was quoted as saying "It had nothing to do with Rob Halford, Ripper Owens and Judas Priest, it's got nothing to do with that, whatsoever. It was fiction. Apart from the fact that 'Local Boy Makes Good'? That was the only true aspect of the movie." Hill was quick to add "I watched it once. I don't have the urge to watch it again. [laughs]"

In October 2026, Hill announced that he would be leaving Judas Priest, after arthritis in his shoulders, hands and knees had made it increasingly difficult for him to play. He was replaced by Dave Rimmer of Uriah Heep.

== Personal life ==
Hill learned how to play the double bass from his father, a bass player for local jazz acts. His father died when he was fifteen. Hill married Rob Halford's sister, Sue, in 1976 and they divorced in 1984. Together they have a son, Alex, who was born in 1980. Hill lived in Florida while he was married to his second wife, Letitia. They had a daughter. He met his present wife, Jean, in 1999, and married in 2006. The couple resides in Staffordshire.

He is a supporter of West Bromwich Albion F.C.

== Musical equipment ==
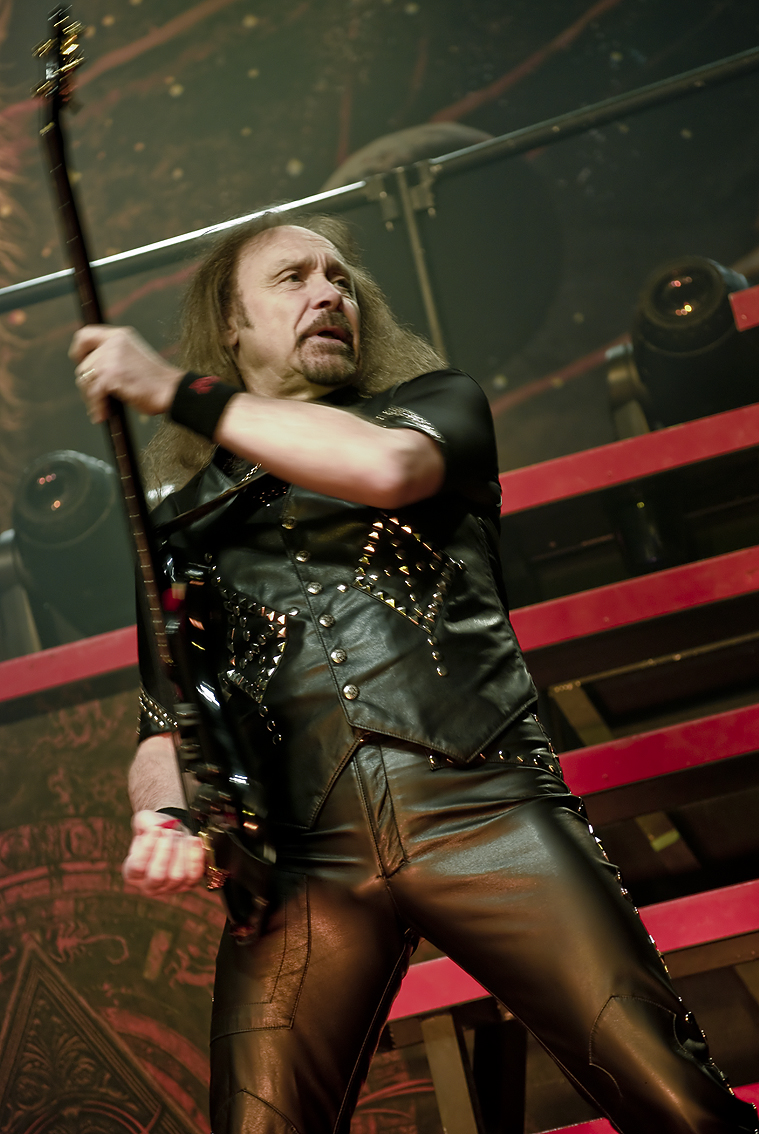
Hill performing in 2009

In the early years of Judas Priest, Hill played a 1970s Fender Jazz Bass, switching to Hamer in the mid-1980s. From the 80s to the end of his career, Hill played Spector basses. Spector currently produces an Ian Hill signature bass guitar, based on Hill's NS-2 and fitted with a narrower neck, with an optional tuning of BEAD. He played using a nylon flatpick of 0.75 mm thickness.

While Hill used a wide range of different amplifiers through his career, he began using SWR products in the late 1990s. His latest rig consisted of two SWR SM1500 amplifiers and four SWR TRIAD cabinets. During the Jugulator and Demolition recording sessions, Hill used a five-string Spector bass to access the lower registers needed through the use of down tuned guitars by Tipton and Downing.

== Discography ==
- Rocka Rolla (1974)
- Sad Wings of Destiny (1976)
- Sin After Sin (1977)
- Stained Class (1978)
- Killing Machine (1978)
- British Steel (1980)
- Point of Entry (1981)
- Screaming for Vengeance (1982)
- Defenders of the Faith (1984)
- Turbo (1986)
- Ram It Down (1988)
- Painkiller (1990)
- Jugulator (1997)
- Demolition (2001)
- Angel of Retribution (2005)
- Nostradamus (2008)
- Redeemer of Souls (2014)
- Firepower (2018)
- Invincible Shield (2024)
