= Retribution Tour =

2005 concert tour by Judas Priest

- Tour by Judas Priest
- Associated album: Angel of Retribution
- Start date: 23 February 2005
- End date: 3 December 2005
- No. of shows: 111 (113 scheduled)

Judas Priest concert chronology
- Reunited Tour (2004); Retribution Tour (2005); Nostradamus World Tour (2008–2009)

The Retribution Tour was a 2005 concert tour by English heavy metal band, Judas Priest, which was in support of the album, Angel of Retribution. It ran from 23 February 2005 until 3 December 2005.

The 18 & 19 May shows from Tokyo were filmed, in which the footage from the 19 May show was used for the live DVD, Rising in the East, which was released on 15 November 2005.

== Setlist ==
From 23 February 2005

1. "The Hellion"
2. "Electric Eye"
3. "Riding on the Wind"
4. "The Ripper"
5. "A Touch of Evil"
6. "Judas Rising"
7. "Revolution"
8. "Hot Rockin'"
9. "Breaking the Law"
10. "I'm a Rocker"
11. "Diamonds & Rust" (Joan Baez cover)
12. "Deal With the Devil"
13. "Hellrider"
14. "Beyond the Realms of Death"
15. "Exciter"
16. "Victim of Changes"
17. "The Green Manalishi (With the Two Prong Crown) (Fleetwood Mac cover)
18. "Painkiller"
19. "Hell Bent for Leather"
20. "Living After Midnight"
21. "You've Got Another Thing Comin'"

From 2 March 2005

1. "The Hellion"
2. "Electric Eye"
3. "Metal Gods"
4. "Riding on the Wind"
5. "The Ripper"
6. "A Touch of Evil"
7. "Judas Rising"
8. "Revolution"
9. "Hot Rockin'"
10. "Breaking the Law"
11. "I'm a Rocker"
12. "Diamonds & Rust" (Joan Baez cover)
13. "Deal With the Devil"
14. "Beyond the Realms of Death"
15. "Turbo Lover"
16. "Exciter"
17. "Victim of Changes"
18. "The Green Manalishi (With the Two-Pronged Crown) (Fleetwood Mac cover)
19. "Painkiller"
20. "Hell Bent for Leather"
21. "Living After Midnight"
22. "You've Got Another Thing Comin'"

From 19 May 2005

1. "The Hellion"
2. "Electric Eye"
3. "Metal Gods"
4. "Riding on the Wind"
5. "The Ripper"
6. "A Touch of Evil"
7. "Judas Rising"
8. "Revolution"
9. "Hot Rockin'"
10. "I'm a Rocker"
11. "Diamonds & Rust" (Joan Baez cover)
12. "Worth Fighting For"
13. "Deal With the Devil"
14. "Beyond the Realms of Death"
15. "Turbo Lover"
16. "Hellrider"
17. "Victim of Changes"
18. "Exciter"
19. "Painkiller"
20. "Hell Bent for Leather"
21. "Living After Midnight"
22. "You've Got Another Thing Comin'"

From 5 October 2005

1. "The Hellion"
2. "Electric Eye"
3. "Solar Angels"
4. "Riding on the Wind"
5. "A Touch of Evil"
6. "Judas Rising"
7. "Revolution"
8. "I'm a Rocker"
9. "Breaking the Law"
10. "Diamonds & Rust" (Joan Baez cover)
11. "Worth Fighting For"
12. "Beyond the Realms of Death"
13. "Turbo Lover"
14. "Hellrider"
15. "Victim of Changes"
16. "Painkiller"
17. "Desert Plains"
18. "Living After Midnight"
19. "You've Got Another Thing Comin'"

== Tour dates ==
The band would tour with In Flames for the first European leg, with Scorpions for the UK leg, second European leg and Japanese leg, with Queensrÿche for the first North American leg, with Whitesnake for the Latin American leg and with Anthrax for most of the second North American leg. Hatebreed was added to the lineup for the 5 October date only

Date	City	Country	Venue
Europe
23 February 2005	Copenhagen	Denmark	Valbyhallen
25 February 2005	Karlstad	Sweden	Löfbergs Lila Arena
26 February 2005	Stockholm	Sweden	Globe Arena
28 February 2005	Oulu	Finland	Oulu Ice Hall
2 March 2005	Tampere	Finland	Tampere Ice Stadium
3 March 2005	Helsinki	Finland	Hartwall Arena
5 March 2005	Gothenburg	Sweden	Scandinavium
8 March 2005	Oslo	Norway	Oslo Spektrum
10 March 2005	Essen	Germany	Grugahalle
11 March 2005	Offenbach am Main	Germany	Stadthalle Offenbach
13 March 2005	Munich	Germany	Zenith
14 March 2005	Böblingen	Germany	Sporthalle
16 March 2005	London	England	Hammersmith Apollo
17 March 2005	London	England	Hammersmith Apollo
19 March 2005	Birmingham	England	NEC Arena
21 March 2005	Manchester	England	Carling Apollo Manchester
22 March 2005	Manchester	England	Carling Apollo Manchester
24 March 2005	Belfast	Ireland	Odyssey
26 March 2005	Glasgow	Scotland	S.E.C.C.
27 March 2005	Newcastle	England	Metro Radio Arena
28 March 2005	Sheffield	England	Hallam FM Arena
30 March 2005	Cardiff	Wales	Cardiff International Arena
31 March 2005	Plymouth	England	Plymouth Pavilions
2 April 2005	's-Hertogenbosch	Netherlands	Brabanthallen
4 April 2005	Zwickau	Germany	Stadthalle
~~6 April 2005~~	Katowice	Poland	Spodek
7 April 2005	Brno	Czech Republic	DRFG Arena
8 April 2005	Vienna	Austria	Planet.tt Bank Austria Halle Gasometer
10 April 2005	Milan	Italy	Palatrussardi
12 April 2005	Madrid	Spain	Palacio Vistalegre
13 April 2005	Lisbon	Portugal	MEO Arena
14 April 2005	Corunna	Spain	Coliseum
16 April 2005	Zaragoza	Spain	Plaza de Toros de Zaragoza
17 April 2005	Badalona	Spain	Palau Municipal d'Esports de Badalona
Japan
8 May 2005	Yokohama	Japan	Pacifico Yokohama
10 May 2005	Nagoya	Japan	Nagoya Shimin Kaikan
11 May 2005	Kanazawa	Japan	Koseinenkin Hall
13 May 2005	Hiroshima	Japan	Yubinchokin Hall
14 May 2005	Fukuoka	Japan	Zepp
16 May 2005	Osaka	Japan	Osaka-jō Hall
18 May 2005	Tokyo	Japan	Nippon Budokan
19 May 2005	Tokyo	Japan	Nippon Budokan
North America
30 May 2005	Cuyahoga Falls	United States	Blossom Music Center
1 June 2005	Saint Paul	United States	Xcel Energy Center
3 June 2005	Tinley Park	United States	Tweeter Center
4 June 2005	Clarkston	United States	DTE Energy Music Theatre
5 June 2005	Toronto	Canada	Molson Canadian Amphitheatre
7 June 2005	Darien	United States	Darien Lake Performing Arts Center
8 June 2005	Manchester	United States	Verizon Wireless Arena
10 June 2005	Holmdel	United States	PNC Bank Arts Center
11 June 2005	Uncasville	United States	Mohegan Sun Arena
12 June 2005	Mansfield	United States	Tweeter Center
14 June 2005	Scranton	United States	Ford Pavilion
15 June 2005	Hershey	United States	Giant Center
17 June 2005	Wantagh	United States	Jones Beach Theater
18 June 2005	Camden	United States	Tweeter Center
19 June 2005	Bristow	United States	Nissan Pavilion
21 June 2005	Atlanta	United States	HiFi Buys Amphitheatre
22 June 2005	Tampa	United States	Ford Amphitheatre
23 June 2005	West Palm Beach	United States	Sound Advice Amphitheatre
25 June 2005	Selma	United States	Verizon Wireless Amphitheater
26 June 2005	Dallas	United States	Smirnoff Music Center
28 June 2005	Albuquerque	United States	Journal Pavilion
29 June 2005	Greenwood Village	United States	Fiddler's Green Amphitheatre
1 July 2005	Reno	United States	Grand Sierra Resort
2 July 2005	Mountain View	United States	Shoreline Amphitheatre
4 July 2005	Ridgefield	United States	Clark County Amphitheater
6 July 2005	Auburn	United States	White River Amphitheatre
8 July 2005	Irvine	United States	Verizon Wireless Amphitheater
9 July 2005	Las Vegas	United States	Mandalay Bay Events Center
10 July 2005	Phoenix	United States	Cricket Wireless Pavilion
North America / South America
1 September 2005	Monterrey	Mexico	Auditorio Citibanamex
3 September 2005	Mexico City	Mexico	Palacio de los Deportes
6 September 2005	Porto Alegre	Brazil	Gigantinho
8 September 2005	Rio de Janeiro	Brazil	Citibank Hall
9 September 2005	São Paulo	Brazil	Anhembi Convention Center
11 September 2005	Buenos Aires	Argentina	Estadio Arquitecto Ricardo Etcheverry
13 September 2005	Santiago	Chile	Pista Atlética Estadio Nacional
16 September 2005	San Juan	Puerto Rico	Roberto Clemente Coliseum
23 September 2005	Mount Pleasant	United States	Soaring Eagle Casino
25 September 2005	Cincinnati	United States	Riverbend Music Center
26 September 2005	Champaign	United States	Champaign Assembly Hall
27 September 2005	Champaign	United States	Champaign Assembly Hall
28 September 2005	Rockford	United States	Rockford Metro Center
29 September 2005	Kalamazoo	United States	Wings Stadium
1 October 2005	Milwaukee	United States	U.S Cellular Arena
2 October 2005	Moline	United States	The MARK of the Quad Cities
4 October 2005	Portland	United States	State Theatre
5 October 2005	Bridgeport	United States	Harbor Yard Arena
7 October 2005	Lowell	United States	Tsongas Center
8 October 2005	Syracuse	United States	Landmark Theatre
9 October 2005	Atlantic City	United States	Borgata Events Center
11 October 2005	Poughkeepsie	United States	Mid-Hudson Civic Center
12 October 2005	Montreal	Canada	Centre Bell
14 October 2005	Ottawa	Canada	Corel Centre
15 October 2005	London	Canada	John Labatt Center
18 October 2005	Winnipeg	Canada	MTS Centre
20 October 2005	Edmonton	Canada	Rexall Place
21 October 2005	Calgary	Canada	Scotiabank Saddledome
23 October 2005	Vancouver	Canada	Pacific Coliseum
24 October 2005	Vernon	Canada	Multiplex
26 October 2005	West Valley	United States	E Center
28 October 2005	Kelseyville	United States	Konocti Harbor
29 October 2005	San Diego	United States	IPayOne Center
30 October 2005	Long Beach	United States	Long Beach Arena
31 October 2005	San Diego	United States	IPayOne Center
Europe
24 November 2005	Kyiv	Ukraine	Palace of Sports
27 November 2005	Moscow	Russia	Dvorets Sporta Luzhniki
28 November 2005	Saint Petersburg	Russia	Ledovy Dvorets
1 December 2005	Tallinn	Estonia	Saku Suurhall
2 December 2005	Riga	Latvia	Kipsala Exhibition Hall
3 December 2005	Vilnius	Lithuania	Utenos pramogų arena

Cancelled dates

24 September 2005	Burgettstown	KeyBank Pavilion

== Box office score data ==
The attendance data reveals the first batch of box office scores from select venues from 1 October to 21 October 2005. The second batch reveals the select scores from 25 June to 12 November 2005

Venue	City	Tickets sold / available	Gross revenue
Verizon Wireless Amphitheater	Selma	11,976 / 19,262 (62%)	
Journal Pavilion	Albuquerque	6,771 / 12,121 (55%)	
Coors Amphitheatre	Englewood	4,626 / 16,738 (27%)	$164,781
White River Amphitheatre City	Auburn	4,977 / 19,512 (25%)	
Mandalay Bay Events Center	Las Vegas	5,245 / 7,094 (74%)	
Shoreline Amphitheatre City	Mountain View	11,303 / 22,000 (51%)	
Riverbend Music Center	Cincinnati	5,673 / 20,500 (27%)	
Rockford MetroCentre	Rockford	2,124 / 6,602 (32%)	
U.S. Cellular Arena	Milwaukee	3,698 / 8,605 (43%)	
State Theatre	Portland	817 / 1,750 (46%)	
Arena at Harbor Yard	Bridgeport	2,007 / 6,097 (32%)	$99,317
Paul E. Tsongas Arena	Lowell	1,716 / 6,800 (25%)	
Borgata Event Center	Atlantic City	2,053 / 2,255 (91%)	
Bell Centre	Montreal	4,747 / 5,000 (94%)	
Corel Centre	Ottawa	2,722 / 3,184 (85%)	
John Labatt Centre	London (Can)	2,910 / 3,199 (91%)	
MTS Centre	Winnipeg	5,024 / 7,682 (65%)	$214,784
Rexall Place	Edmonton	4,850 / 7,500 (64%)	$223,261
Pengrowth Saddledome	Calgary	5,824 / 7,500 (75%)	$255,571
Pacific Coliseum	Vancouver	4,004 / 8,000 (50%)	$181,272
