= Painkiller Tour =

1990–91 concert tour by Judas Priest

- Tour by Judas Priest
- Poster with the UK tour dates
- Associated album: Painkiller
- Start date: 18 October 1990
- End date: 15 April 1991
- No. of shows: 63 in North America; 43 in Europe; 4 in Oceania; 1 in South America; 111 total

Judas Priest concert chronology
- Mercenaries of Metal Tour (1988); Painkiller Tour (1990–1991); Operation Rock & Roll (1991)

The Painkiller Tour was a concert tour by English heavy metal band Judas Priest which was in support of the album Painkiller. It ran from 18 October 1990 until 15 April 1991.

This tour introduced new drummer Scott Travis from Racer X, who joined the band in 1989 after previous drummer Dave Holland's departure that same year. He has remained with the band ever since, surpassing Holland as the band's longest serving drummer.

== Pre-tour ==
Judas Priest performed at the third annual Foundations Forum in Los Angeles on 13 September 1990, 5 days before the release of Painkiller. It was recorded and put together along with the performance from Iron Maiden vocalist Bruce Dickinson's solo band (recorded on 27 June 1990 in London) as a bootlegged split live album. The setlist for the event is as follows:

1. "Riding on the Wind"
2. "Grinder"
3. "Heading Out to the Highway"
4. "Between the Hammer and the Anvil"
5. "Bloodstone"
6. "Better By You, Better Than Me" (Spooky Tooth cover)
7. "The Green Manalishi (With the Two Prong Crown)"(Fleetwood Mac cover)
8. "Leather Rebel"
9. "Hell Bent for Leather"
10. "You've Got Another Thing Comin'"

Encore:

1. "Living After Midnight"

Note

- The live versions of "Better By You, Better Than Me" and "Leather Rebel" appear as bonus tracks on the 2001 re-issues of Stained Class and Painkiller respectively.

== Setlist ==
1. "Blood Red Skies" (Intro Only)
2. "Hell Bent for Leather"
3. "Grinder"
4. "The Hellion"
5. "Electric Eye"
6. "All Guns Blazing"
7. "Between The Hammer And The Anvil" (Replaced by "The Sentinel" after 29 October 1990)
8. "Metal Gods"
9. "Bloodstone" (Dropped after 19 October 1990)
10. "Night Crawler"
11. "The Ripper"
12. "Beyond the Realms of Death"
13. "Metal Meltdown" (Replaced by "Riding On The Wind" after 25 October 1990)
14. Drum Solo (Added 31 October 1990(?)*)
15. "A Touch of Evil" (Removed after 11 February 1991)
16. "Victim of Changes"
17. "Painkiller"
18. "The Green Manalishi (With the Two Prong Crown)" (Fleetwood Mac cover)
19. "You've Got Another Thing Comin'"

Encore:

1. "Breaking the Law"
2. "Living After Midnight"

"Heading Out to the Highway" was also played once.

== Tour dates ==
The band toured with Megadeth and Testament on the North American leg and with Pantera and Annihilator on the European and UK leg. Exodus and Death Angel were originally billed for the European leg, but were dropped for unknown reasons and was replaced by Pantera. They also performed at the second annual Rock in Rio festival with Queensrÿche, Megadeth, Lobão and Sepultura on 23 January 1991.

Date	City	Country	Venue
North American leg #1
18 October 1990	Montreal	Canada	Montreal Forum
19 October 1990	Quebec City	Canada	Colisée de Québec
22 October 1990	Toronto	Canada	Maple Leaf Gardens
25 October 1990	Winnipeg	Canada	Winnipeg Arena
26 October 1990	Regina	Canada	Regina Agridome
28 October 1990	Calgary	Canada	Olympic Saddledome
29 October 1990	Edmonton	Canada	Northlands Coliseum
31 October 1990	Vancouver	Canada	Pacific Coliseum
1 November 1990	Portland	United States	Veterans Memorial Coliseum
2 November 1990	Spokane	United States	Spokane Coliseum
3 November 1990	Reno	United States	Lawlor Events Center
4 November 1990	Sacramento	United States	ARCO Arena
5 November 1990	Oakland	United States	Oakland-Alameda County Arena
7 November 1990	Tempe	United States	ASU Activity Center
8 November 1990	Los Angeles	United States	Los Angeles Memorial Sports Arena
9 November 1990	Irvine	United States	Irvine Meadows Amphitheatre
10 November 1990	San Diego	United States	San Diego Sports Arena
11 November 1990	San Diego	United States	San Diego Sports Arena
12 November 1990	Salt Lake City	United States	Salt Palace
14 November 1990	El Paso	United States	Special Events Center
16 November 1990	San Antonio	United States	Hemisfair Arena
17 November 1990	Dallas	United States	Reunion Arena
18 November 1990	Houston	United States	The Summit
20 November 1990	Denver	United States	McNichols Sports Arena
21 November 1990	Albuquerque	United States	Tingley Coliseum
23 November 1990	Tulsa	United States	Expo Square Pavilion
24 November 1990	Kansas City	United States	Municipal Auditorium
25 November 1990	Omaha	United States	Omaha Civic Auditorium
27 November 1990	Columbus	United States	Taft Coliseum
28 November 1990	Rosemont	United States	Rosemont Horizon
29 November 1990	Saint Paul	United States	St. Paul Civic Center
1 December 1990	Indianapolis	United States	Market Square Arena
2 December 1990	Richfield	United States	Richfield Coliseum
3 December 1990	Dayton	United States	Hara Arena
5 December 1990	Auburn Hills	United States	The Palace of Auburn Hills
6 December 1990	Rochester	United States	War Memorial Auditorium
7 December 1990	Worcester	United States	Centrum in Worcester
8 December 1990	New Haven	United States	New Haven Veterans Memorial Coliseum
9 December 1990	Landover	United States	Capital Centre
11 December 1990	Atlanta	United States	Omni Coliseum
13 December 1990	Hampton	United States	Hampton Coliseum
14 December 1990	East Rutherford	United States	Brendan Byrne Arena
15 December 1990	Uniondale	United States	Nassau Veterans Memorial Coliseum
16 December 1990	Philadelphia	United States	Spectrum
17 December 1990	Pittsburgh	United States	Civic Arena
19 December 1990	Lakeland	United States	Lakeland Civic Center
20 December 1990	Miami	United States	Miami Arena
21 December 1990	Tampa	United States	USF Sun Dome
23 December 1990	Orlando	United States	Orlando Arena
9 January 1991	Portland	United States	Cumberland County Civic Center
10 January 1991	Binghamton	United States	Broome County Memorial Arena
11 January 1991	Syracuse	United States	Oncenter War Memorial Arena
12 January 1991	Providence	United States	Providence Civic Center
14 January 1991	Albany	United States	Knickerbocker Arena
15 January 1991	Wilkes-Barre, Pennsylvania	United States	Kingston Armory
16 January 1991	Toledo	United States	Toledo Sports Arena
17 January 1991	Kalamazoo	United States	Wings Event Center
18 January 1991	Pittsburgh	United States	Palumbo Center
Rock in Rio II
23 January 1991	Rio de Janeiro	Brazil	Maracanã Stadium
European Leg
31 January 1991	Copenhagen	Denmark	K.B. Hallen
1 February 1991	Gothenburg	Sweden	Scandinavium
2 February 1991	Stockholm	Sweden	Hovet
4 February 1991	Helsinki	Finland	Helsinki Ice Hall
6 February 1991	Oslo	Norway	Rockefeller Music Hall
8 February 1991	Essen	Germany	Grugahalle
9 February 1991	Hamburg	Germany	Alsterdorfer Sporthalle
11 February 1991	Berlin	Germany	Eissporthalle an der Jafféstraße
12 February 1991	Hanover	Germany	Eilenriedehalle
14 February 1991	Saarbrücken	Germany	Saarlandhalle
15 February 1991	Ravensburg	Germany	Oberschwabenhalle
16 February 1991	Würzburg	Germany	s.Oliver Arena
18 February 1991	Offenbach	Germany	Stadthalle Offenbach
19 February 1991	Munich	Germany	Olympiahalle
20 February 1991	Vienna	Austria	Bank-Austria Zelt
21 February 1991	Graz	Austria	Eisstadion Liebenau
23 February 1991	Lucerne	Switzerland	Festhalle
24 February 1991	Bolzano	Italy	Palasport / Stadthalle
25 February 1991	Ljubljana	Yugoslavia	Tivoli Hall
26 February 1991	Zagreb	Yugoslavia	Dom Sportova
1 March 1991	Rome	Italy	Teatro Tendastrisce
2 March 1991	Brescia	Italy	Palasport
4 March 1991	Stuttgart	Germany	Hanns-Martin-Schleyer-Halle
5 March 1991	Ludwigshafen am Rhein	Germany	Friedrich-Ebert-Halle
6 March 1991	Koblenz	Germany	Rhein-Mosel Halle
8 March 1991	Zaragoza	Spain	Plaza de Toros de Zaragoza
9 March 1991	San Sebastián	Spain	Velódromo de Anoeta
10 March 1991	Madrid	Spain	Palacio de Deportes de la Comunidad de Madrid
12 March 1991	Villeurbanne	France	Le Transbordeur
13 March 1991	Cascais	Portugal	Pavilhão do Grupo Dramático e Sportivo de Cascais
15 March 1991	Arnhem	Netherlands	Rijnhal
16 March 1991	Brussels	Belgium	Forest National
17 March 1991	Paris	France	Le Zénith
19 March 1991	Aston	England	Aston Arena
20 March 1991	Manchester	England	Manchester Apollo
22 March 1991	London	England	Hammersmith Apollo
23 March 1991	London	England	Hammersmith Apollo
24 March 1991	Newport	Wales	Newport Centre
26 March 1991	Sheffield	England	Sheffield City Hall
27 March 1991	Newcastle	England	Newcastle City Hall
28 March 1991	Edinburgh	Scotland	Edinburgh Playhouse
30 March 1991	Belfast	Northern Ireland	Ulster Hall
31 March 1991	Dublin	Ireland	SFX Centre
North American leg #2
4 April 1991	Fairbanks	United States	Carlson Center
7 April 1991	Anchorage	United States	William A. Egan Civic and Convention Center
8 April 1991	Anchorage	United States	William A. Egan Civic and Convention Center
Asia leg
12 April 1991	Osaka	Japan	Osaka-jō Hall
13 April 1991	Yokohama	Japan	Yokohama Arena
14 April 1991	Tokyo	Japan	NHK Hall
15 April 1991	Tokyo	Japan	Yoyogi National Gymnasium
