= Rising in the East =

Video by Judas Priest
- Released: 15 November 2005
- Recorded: 19 May 2005
- Venue: Nippon Budokan (Tokyo, Japan)
- Genre: Heavy metal
- Length: 120:03
- Label: Rhino

Judas Priest chronology
Electric Eye (2003)	Rising in the East (2005)	Live Vengeance '82 (2006)

Professional ratings
Review scores
Source	Rating
Allmusic	link

Rising in the East is a live DVD of Judas Priest, released on 15 November 2005, performing a concert in Tokyo's Nippon Budokan, filmed on 19 May 2005. It is the first straight-to-DVD release.

== Release ==
In unconfirmed internet reports, the DVD was to be pushed back to January 2006 while other online retailers still listed its release for 15 November 2005. In addition, two different cover arts had surfaced with former website Play.com displaying a cover art unlike one displayed on Amazon.

== Information ==
The band filmed two sold-out performances on 18 & 19 May 2005 in Tokyo in which the latter footage was used instead. Glenn Tipton explains that the band decided to film their performances at the Budokan "because it's a special venue. It's world-renowned. We thought it was an ideal choice. We filmed both nights but we ended up using the second night only for this DVD. We wanted it to be as live and as real as possible, and when you start taking from different shows there isn't continuity. We wanted it to be one show and that's exactly what it is." Rob Halford says that the display of Rising in the East to the fans "is the first time seeing us reunited for a full-length show in the DVD format. I think the DVD compounds all the great things that Priest fans and metal fans all around the world love about the band. Priest is still a powerful, physical, full-on experience in the live domain. What this DVD is intended to do is give longtime Priest fans another great memory to add to their collection, and it's also an opportunity for new Priest fans to explore all the great things we're achieving three decades later."

== Track listing ==
No.	Title	Length
1.	"The Hellion" (Instrumental)	1:22
2.	"Electric Eye"	3:42
3.	"Metal Gods"	4:44
4.	"Riding on the Wind"	3:23
5.	"The Ripper"	3:09
6.	"A Touch of Evil"	6:04
7.	"Judas Rising"	4:28
8.	"Revolution"	4:55
9.	"Hot Rockin'"	3:41
10.	"Breaking the Law"	3:21
11.	"I'm a Rocker"	3:50
12.	"Diamonds & Rust" (Joan Baez cover)	4:14
13.	"Worth Fighting for"	4:39
14.	"Deal with the Devil"	4:26
15.	"Beyond the Realms of Death"	6:52
16.	"Turbo Lover"	6:14
17.	"Hellrider"	5:42
18.	"Victim of Changes"	11:29
19.	"Exciter"	5:57
20.	"Painkiller"	7:09

Encores

No.	Title	Length
21.	"Hell Bent for Leather"	4:18
22.	"Living After Midnight"	6:54
23.	"You've Got Another Thing Comin'"	9:23
Total length:		2:00:03

== Personnel ==
- Rob Halford – vocals
- K.K. Downing – electric guitar
- Glenn Tipton – guitar
- Ian Hill – bass guitar
- Scott Travis – drums

== Sales and certifications ==
Region	Certification	Certified units/sales
United States (RIAA)	Gold	50,000^{^}
^{^} Shipments figures based on certification alone.

== Release history ==
Release formats for Rising in the East
Region	Date	Label	Format	Ref.
North America	15 November 2005	Rhino	DVD	
France	12 December 2005	Rhino	DVD	
Japan	21 December 2005	Rhino	DVD	
Various	15 November 2005	Rhino	DVD	
UK	30 January 2006	Rhino	DVD	
