= Reunited Tour =

2004 concert tour by Judas Priest

- Tour by Judas Priest
- Start date: 2 June 2004
- End date: 2 September 2004
- No. of shows: 47

Judas Priest concert chronology
- Demolition World Tour (2001–2002); Reunited Tour (2004); Retribution Tour (2005)

The Reunited Tour was a 2004 concert tour by English heavy metal band Judas Priest. It ran from 2 June 2004 until 2 September 2004. This tour celebrated the return of Rob Halford since his departure in 1992, replacing vocalist Tim "Ripper" Owens. The band also began performing in E♭ tuning during this tour, which would since be their primary sound.

The 25 June show from Valencia was filmed and used as part of a mini documentary entitled, Reunited, which is featured on the DualDisc release of the 2005 album Angel of Retribution.

== Setlist ==
1. "The Hellion"
2. "Electric Eye"
3. "Metal Gods"
4. "Heading Out to the Highway"
5. "The Ripper"
6. "A Touch of Evil"
7. "The Sentinel"
8. "Turbo Lover"
9. "Victim of Changes"
10. "Diamonds & Rust" (Joan Baez cover)
11. "Breaking the Law"
12. "Beyond the Realms of Death"
13. "The Green Manalishi (With the Two Prong Crown)" (Fleetwood Mac cover)
14. "Painkiller"

Encore:

1. "Hell Bent for Leather"
2. "Living After Midnight"
3. "United"
4. "You've Got Another Thing Comin'"

== Tour dates ==
The band embarked on a warm-up tour in Europe with Annihilator. They also took part in the 2004 edition of Ozzfest in North America as the co-headliner.

Date	City	Country	Venue
Europe
2 June 2004	Hanover	Germany	AWD Hall
4 June 2004	Nuremberg	Germany	Zeppelinfeld
5 June 2004	Bologna	Italy	Gods of Metal
6 June 2004	Frauenfeld	Switzerland	Festhalle Rüegerholz
8 June 2004	Berlin	Germany	Treptow Arena
10 June 2004	Norje	Sweden	Sweden Rock Festival
12 June 2004	Lichtenvoorde	Netherlands	Arrow Rock Festival
13 June 2004	Oberhausen	Germany	König Pilsener Arena
14 June 2004	Prague	Czech Republic	Tipsport Arena
16 June 2004	Budapest	Hungary	Petőfi Csarnok
18 June 2004	Sofia	Bulgaria	Akademik Stadium
20 June 2004	Malakasa	Greece	Rockwave Festival
24 June 2004	Badalona	Spain	Palau Municipal d'Esports de Badalona
25 June 2004	Valencia	Spain	Plaza de Toros de Valencia
27 June 2004	Dessel	Belgium	Graspop Metal Meeting
North America
10 July 2004	Hartford	United States	Meadows Music Theatre
12 July 2004	Mansfield	United States	Tweeter Center
14 July 2004	Wantagh	United States	Tommy Hilfiger at Jones Beach Theater
16 July 2004	Holmdel	United States	PNC Bank Arts Center
17 July 2004	Cadott	United States	Cadott Festival Grounds
18 July 2004	Bristow	United States	Nissan Pavilion
20 July 2004	Columbus	United States	Germain Amphitheater
22 July 2004	Nashville	United States	Starwood Amphitheatre
24 July 2004	Greenwood Village	United States	Fiddler's Green Amphitheatre
26 July 2004	Nampa	United States	Idaho Center
27 July 2004	Auburn	United States	White River Amphitheatre
29 July 2004	Mountain View	United States	Shoreline Amphitheatre
30 July 2004	Wheatland	United States	Sleep Train Amphitheatre
31 July 2004	San Bernardino	United States	San Manuel Amphitheater
3 August 2004	Albuquerque	United States	Isleta Amphitheater
4 August 2004	El Paso	United States	Don Haskins Center
5 August 2004	Dallas	United States	Smirnoff Music Center
7 August 2004	Selma	United States	Verizon Wireless Amphitheater
8 August 2004	The Woodlands	United States	C.W. Mitchell Pavilion
10 August 2004	Bonner Springs	United States	Verizon Wireless Amphitheater
12 August 2004	Maryland Heights	United States	UMB Bank Pavilion
14 August 2004	East Troy	United States	Alpine Valley Music Theatre
17 August 2004	Clarkston	United States	DTE Energy Music Theatre
18 August 2004	Toronto	Canada	Molson Amphitheatre
19 August 2004	Cuyahoga Falls	United States	Blossom Music Center
21 August 2004	Tinley Park	United States	Tweeter Center
24 August 2004	Noblesville	United States	Verizon Wireless Music Center
26 August 2004	Camden	United States	Tweeter Center
28 August 2004	Burgettstown	United States	Post-Gazette Pavilion
29 August 2004	Uncasville	United States	Mohegan Sun Arena
31 August 2004	Raleigh	United States	Alltel Pavilion at Walnut Creek
2 September 2004	Tampa	United States	Ford Amphitheatre

Cancelled dates

23 June 2004	Grenoble, France	Le Summum	Technical difficulties with the venue
4 September 2004	West Palm Beach	Sound Advice Amphitheatre	Due to threat of Hurricane Frances
