= Operation Rock & Roll =

1991 concert tour

- Tour by Judas Priest, Alice Cooper, Motörhead, Dangerous Toys and Metal Church
- Associated album: Painkiller; Hey Stoopid; 1916; Hellacious Acres; The Human Factor
- Start date: 9 July 1991
- End date: 19 August 1991
- No. of shows: 31
Judas Priest tour chronology
Painkiller Tour (1990–1991)	Operation Rock & Roll (1991)	Jugulator Tour (1998)

Operation Rock & Roll was a 1991 concert tour featuring Judas Priest, Alice Cooper, Motörhead, Dangerous Toys and Metal Church. It ran from 9 July 1991 until 19 August 1991 in the United States and Canada. This tour was in honor of the US forces involved in Operation Desert Storm during the Gulf War. This would also be Judas Priest's final tour with Rob Halford until 2004.

Judas Priest continued to tour in support of Painkiller, with Alice Cooper supporting Hey Stoopid, Motörhead supporting 1916, Dangerous Toys supporting Hellacious Acres and Metal Church supporting The Human Factor.

== Rob Halford incident ==
On the 19 August 1991 show in Toronto, the last date of the tour, an incident occurred when Rob Halford collided with the drum riser as he was making his entrance onstage on his Harley-Davidson motorcycle as Judas Priest was set to perform, breaking his nose in the process. He was left unconscious as "Hell Bent for Leather" was being performed. Crew members struggled to search for Halford in the heavy induced fog, not knowing where he was. After a short while, guitarist Glenn Tipton stumbled upon him on the ground and Halford was then assisted by the crew members. He regained consciousness afterwards and finished the show with a plaster on the bridge of his nose. After the show, he was transferred to the local medical clinic where he was treated for a concussion.

In the 2004 Reunited documentary, Tipton explained that so much dry ice, smoke and pyrotechnics was the primary factor that the center of the stage got stuck, "Rob went down on the ramp on the bike, and, so lucky, he'd actually just caught the top of his head, you know, I mean it could've literally have killed him. And it knocked him off. So we started the number not knowing what had gone on because there was so much dry ice and smoke, until I stepped on Rob, [Laughs] I actually stepped on Rob, 'What's this? On the stage', you know, 'some Priest prop.' And it was Rob and he was stunned so we played the first song which was, I'm not sure whether it was "Electric Eye" or, without him...anyway true to professional form he rallied around and joined us on stage in the second number."

== Set lists ==
Metal Church setlist

1. "The Human Factor"
2. "Start the Fire"
3. "In Mourning"
4. "Fake Healer"
5. "Badlands"
6. "Date with Poverty"

Dangerous Toys setlist

1. "Sportin' A Woody"
2. "Sticks & Stones"
3. "Sugar, Leather & The Nail"
4. "Angel N U"
5. "Line' Em Up"
6. "Gimmie No Lip"
7. "Scared"
8. "Teas'n Pleas'n"

Motörhead setlist

1. "Doctor Rock" or "I'll Be Your Sister"
2. "Traitor"
3. "No Voices in the Sky"
4. "Metropolis"
5. "The One to Sing the Blues"
6. "I'm So Bad (Baby I Don't Care)"
7. "Going to Brazil"
8. "Love Me Forever"
9. "Angel City"
10. "Killed By Death"
11. "Ace of Spades"

Alice Cooper setlist

1. "Under My Wheels"
2. "Trash"
3. "No More Mr. Nice Guy"
4. "Billion Dollar Babies"
5. "Love's a Loaded Gun"
6. "Bed of Nails"
7. "I'm Eighteen"
8. "I Love the Dead / Devil's Food / Steven / Black Widow Jam"
9. "Sick Things"
10. "Feed My Frankenstein"
11. "Cold Ethyl"
12. "Only Women Bleed"
13. "Poison"
14. "Go to Hell"
15. "School's Out"

Encore:

16. "Hey Stoopid"
17. "Elected"

Judas Priest setlist

1. "Hell Bent for Leather"
2. "Heading Out to the Highway"
3. "The Hellion"
4. "Electric Eye"
5. "Diamonds & Rust" (Joan Baez cover) (Dropped after 14 July 1991)
6. "All Guns Blazing"
7. "Metal Gods"
8. "Some Heads Are Gonna Roll"
9. "The Ripper"
10. "Night Crawler"
11. "A Touch of Evil"
12. "Painkiller"
13. "The Green Manalishi (With the Two Prong Crown)" (Fleetwood Mac cover)
14. "Breaking the Law"
15. "Living After Midnight"
16. "You've Got Another Thing Comin'"

"Turbo Lover" and "Victim of Changes" were also occasionally performed.

== Tour dates ==
Date	City	Country	Venue
9 July 1991	Salt Lake City	United States	Salt Palace
12 July 1991	Irvine	United States	Irvine Meadows
13 July 1991	Mountain View	United States	Shoreline Amphitheatre
14 July 1991	Sacramento	United States	Cal Expo Amphitheatre
16 July 1991	Morrison	United States	Red Rocks Amphitheatre
19 July 1991	Cedar Rapids	United States	Five Seasons Center
20 July 1991	Tinley Park	United States	World Music Theater
21 July 1991	Antioch	United States	Starwood Amphitheatre
23 July 1991	Lakeland	United States	Lakeland Civic Center
24 July 1991	Orlando	United States	Orlando Arena
25 July 1991	Atlanta	United States	Coca-Cola Lakewood Amphitheatre
27 July 1991	Houston	United States	The Summit
28 July 1991	Dallas	United States	Coca-Cola Starplex Amphitheatre
30 July 1991	Charlotte	United States	Blockbuster Pavilion
31 July 1991	Raleigh	United States	Walnut Creek Amphitheatre
2 August 1991	Burgettstown	United States	Star Lake Amphitheater
3 August 1991	Clarkston	United States	Pine Knob Music Theatre
4 August 1991	Merrillville	United States	Star Plaza Theatre
6 August 1991	Noblesville	United States	Deer Creek Music Center
7 August 1991	Richfield	United States	Richfield Coliseum
8 August 1991	Weedsport	United States	Cayuga County Fair Speedway
9 August 1991	East Rutherford	United States	Brendan Byrne Arena
10 August 1991	Philadelphia	United States	Spectrum
11 August 1991	Bristol	United States	Lake Compounce
13 August 1991	Old Orchard Beach	United States	The Ball Park
14 August 1991	Mansfield	United States	Great Woods
15 August 1991	Landover	United States	Capital Centre
16 August 1991	Middletown	United States	Orange County Fair Speedway
17 August 1991	Montreal	Canada	Montreal Forum
19 August 1991	Toronto	Canada	CNE Grandstand
