= Dangerous Toys (album) =

Studio album by Dangerous Toys
- Released: May 9, 1989
- Recorded: September–November 1988
- Studios: Sound City Studios, Van Nuys, California
- Genres: Glam metal, southern rock
- Length: 39:02
- Label: Columbia
- Producer: Max Norman

Dangerous Toys chronology
Dangerous Toys (1989)	Hellacious Acres (1991)

Singles from Dangerous Toys
- 1. "Teas'n Pleas'n" Released: 1989; 2. "Scared" / "Bones in the Gutter" Released: 1989; 3. "Sportin' a Woody" Released: 1990

Professional ratings
Review scores
Source	Rating
AllMusic	4/5 stars
Classic Rock	6/10 stars
The Collector's Guide to Heavy Metal	5/10

Dangerous Toys is the debut album by Texas hard rock band Dangerous Toys, released in 1989. It includes the singles "Teas'n Pleas'n" and "Scared," the former covered by Shadows Fall on Fallout from the War, the latter a tribute to Alice Cooper. "Sportin' a Woody" was also released as a single to promote the album.

Although second guitarist Danny Aaron is pictured on the album's back cover and credited for playing, he does not play on the album. Tim Trembley left Dangerous Toys before the recording sessions began, leaving Scott Dalhover their only guitarist, who played all guitar parts on the album.

Dangerous Toys remains the band's best-selling album, having been certified gold by the RIAA in 1994, and receiving their highest chart position in the United States at number 65.

== Track listing ==
All music is composed by Dangerous Toys.

No.	Title	Lyrics	Length
1.	"Teas'n, Pleas'n"	Jason McMaster, Tim Trembley	3:12
2.	"Scared"	McMaster	4:02
3.	"Bones in the Gutter"	McMaster	3:25
4.	"Take Me Drunk"	McMaster	3:56
5.	"Feels Like a Hammer"	McMaster	4:11
6.	"Sport'n a Woody"	McMaster	3:28
7.	"Queen of the Nile"	McMaster	3:27
8.	"Outlaw"	McMaster, Trembley	3:20
9.	"Here Comes Trouble"	McMaster	3:20
10.	"Ten Boots (Stompin')"	Mike Watson	3:11
11.	"That Dog"	McMaster	3:27

== Personnel ==
=== Dangerous Toys ===
- Jason McMaster - lead vocals
- Scott Dalhover - lead guitar
- Mike Watson - bass, backing vocals
- Mark Geary - drums
- Danny Aaron - rhythm guitar, backing vocals (credited, but did not play)

=== Additional musicians ===
- Paula Salvatore, Simms Ellison - backing vocals on "Feels Like a Hammer"

=== Production ===
- Max Norman - production, engineering, mixing at Record Plant, Los Angeles
- Aaron Isaacs, Bruce Barris - assistant engineering
- Bob Ludwig - mastering at Masterdisk, New York

== Charts ==
Chart (1989)	Peak position
US Billboard 200	65

== Certifications ==
Region	Certification	Certified units/sales
United States (RIAA)	Gold	500,000^{^}
^{^} Shipments figures based on certification alone.
