= The R*tist 4*merly Known as Dangerous Toys =

Studio album by Dangerous Toys
- Released: October 17, 1995
- Recorded: June–July 1995
- Studios: Austin Recording Studio, Austin, Texas
- Genre: Alternative metal
- Length: 55:26
- Label: DMZ Records
- Producers: Tom Fletcher, Harry B. Friedman II

Dangerous Toys chronology
Pissed (1994)	The R*tist 4*merly Known as Dangerous Toys (1995)	Vitamins and Crash Helmets Tour – Greatest Hits Live (1999)

Professional ratings
Review scores
Source	Rating
AllMusic	3/5 stars
The Collector's Guide to Heavy Metal	8/10

The R*tist 4*merly Known as Dangerous Toys is the fourth album by Dangerous Toys. It was released in 1995, and is the band's last studio album to date. It is also the only Dangerous Toys album not to feature bassist Mike Watson, who had shortly left after the recording of its predecessor Pissed; instead of replacing him, the band recorded as a four-piece, with frontman Jason McMaster handling bass duties.

== Album title ==
The album's title is a parody of the name used in reference to American recording artist Prince from 1991 to 2000, while the cover artwork is a spoof of his 1988 album Lovesexy.

The album's title was reportedly conceived as a joke from the band, who − following some lineup changes that occurred between Pissed and this album − had considered changing their name before deciding to release it as a Dangerous Toys album.

== Legacy ==
Metal Hammer included the album cover on their list of "50 most hilariously ugly rock and metal album covers ever".

== Track listing ==
1. "Share the Kill" – 3:22
2. "Cure the Sane" – 4:09
3. "The Numb" – 4:10
4. "Take Me Swiftly" – 4:16
5. "Heard It All" – 5:04
6. "Transmission" – 5:45
7. "Words on the Wall" – 3:29
8. "Better to Die" – 4:42
9. "Down Inside" – 3:20
10. "New Anger" – 3:40
11. "Monster Man" – 3:57
12. "To Live the Lie" – 6:52
13. "Mom & Dad" – 2:40

== Personnel ==
Dangerous Toys

- Jason McMaster – vocals, bass
- Scott Dalhover – lead guitar
- Paul Lidel – rhythm guitar
- Mark Geary – drums

Production

- Tom Fletcher – production, engineering, mixing
- Kevin Reeves – mastering
- Harry B. Friedman II – executive production
