= Pissed (album) =

Studio album by Dangerous Toys
- Released: June 1994
- Recorded: February 25 – March 22, 1994
- Studio: The Office, Van Nuys, California
- Genre: Glam metal, heavy metal
- Length: 38:18
- Label: dos/DMZ; EMP Label Group
- Producer: Billy Sherwood, Tom Fletcher

Dangerous Toys chronology
Hellacious Acres (1991)	Pissed (1994)	The R*tist 4*merly Known as Dangerous Toys (1995)

Pissed is the third studio album by American glam metal band Dangerous Toys, released in June 1994. It is the band's first album to feature guitarist Paul Lidel, and their last with bassist Mike Watson, who left just prior to the album's tour.

== Production ==
Recorded in Northridge, California, the album was produced by Billy Sherwood and Tom Fletcher.

== Critical reception ==
Professional ratings
Review scores
Source	Rating
AllMusic	2/5 stars
The Collector's Guide to Heavy Metal	8/10

The Columbus Dispatch wrote that Dangerous Toys' "aggressive brand of hard rock is familiar but fresh."

== Reissues ==
In May 2017, it was announced that Pissed would be reissued on September 8, 2017, by EMP Label Group.

== Track listing ==
All songs by Dangerous Toys.

1. "Pissed" – 4:10
2. "Paintrain" – 4:30
3. "The Law Is Mine" – 3:20
4. "Promise the Moon" – 3:43
5. "Strange" – 4:17
6. "Loser" – 3:59
7. "Hard Luck Champion" – 3:36
8. "Screamin' for More" – 3:02
9. "Oh Well, So What!" – 3:20
10. "Illustrated Man" – 4:28

== Personnel ==
Dangerous Toys

- Jason McMaster - lead vocals
- Scott Dalhover - lead guitar
- Paul Lidel - rhythm guitar, backing vocals
- Mike Watson - bass, backing vocals
- Mark Geary - drums

Production

- Billy Sherwood - production, mixing
- Tom Fletcher - production, engineering, mixing
- Wally Trauogh - mastering
- Richard Easterling - remastering (2017 reissue)
- Thom Hazaert - A&R, executive production (2017 reissue)
- David Ellefson - executive production (2017 reissue)
