= Vitamins and Crash Helmets Tour – Greatest Hits Live =

Vitamins & Crash Helmets Tour - Greatest Hits Live

Live album by Dangerous Toys
- Released: 1999
- Genre: Heavy metal
- Length: 73:08
- Label: Deadline/Cleopatra

Dangerous Toys chronology
The R*tist 4*merly Known as Dangerous Toys (1995)	Vitamins & Crash Helmets Tour - Greatest Hits Live (1999)

Professional ratings
Review scores
Source	Rating
AllMusic	2.5/5 stars
The Collector's Guide to Heavy Metal	7/10

Vitamins & Crash Helmets Tour - Greatest Hits Live is the first live album by heavy metal band Dangerous Toys. It was released in 1999.

== Track listing ==
1. "Outlaw" - 3:46
2. "Take Me Drunk" - 3:59
3. "Queen of the Nile" - 3:34
4. "Bones in the Gutter" - 3:25
5. "Sport'n a Woody" - 3:23
6. "Scared" - 4:17
7. "Teas'n Pleas'n" - 5:01
8. "Best of Friends" - 5:28
9. "Angel N. U." - 5:10
10. "Ten Boots" - 3:07
11. "Line 'Em Up" - 3:01
12. "Gimme No Lip" - 3:19
13. "Gunfighter for Love" - 3:52
14. "Promise the Moon" - 3:56
15. "Pissed" - 3:52
16. "Share the Kill" - 3:22
17. "Transmission" - 5:33
18. "Dangerous Toys" - 5:03

All songs by Dangerous Toys.

== Personnel ==
- Jason McMaster: lead vocals
- Scott Dalhover: lead guitar
- Mike Watson: bass, backing vocals
- Paul Lidel: rhythm guitar, slide guitar, backing vocals
- Mark Geary: drums
