= Demolition (Judas Priest album) =

Studio album by Judas Priest
- Released: 16 July 2001
- Recorded: 1999–2001
- Studios: Silvermere, Surrey, England
- Genres: Heavy metal; Nu metal
- Length: 70:44
- Label: SPV
- Producer: Glenn Tipton

Judas Priest chronology
'98 Live Meltdown (1997)	Demolition (2001)	Angel of Retribution (2005)

Singles from Demolition
- 1. "Machine Man" Released: 1 June 2001

Professional ratings
Review scores
Source	Rating
AllMusic	3/5 stars
Blabbermouth.net	4/10
Kerrang!	4/5 stars
Rolling Stone	link
Sputnikmusic	1.5/5

Demolition is the fourteenth studio album by English heavy metal band Judas Priest, and the first in the decade of the 2000s. It is the second and final studio album to feature Tim "Ripper" Owens on vocals. It is also the only Judas Priest studio album to feature a Parental Advisory label on the album cover due to the songs "Machine Man", "Hell Is Home", and "Metal Messiah" containing profanity.

In October 2021, the album was reissued as part of the band's limited edition 50 Heavy Metal Years of Music box-set, through Sony Music Entertainment and Legacy Recordings.

== Background and reception ==
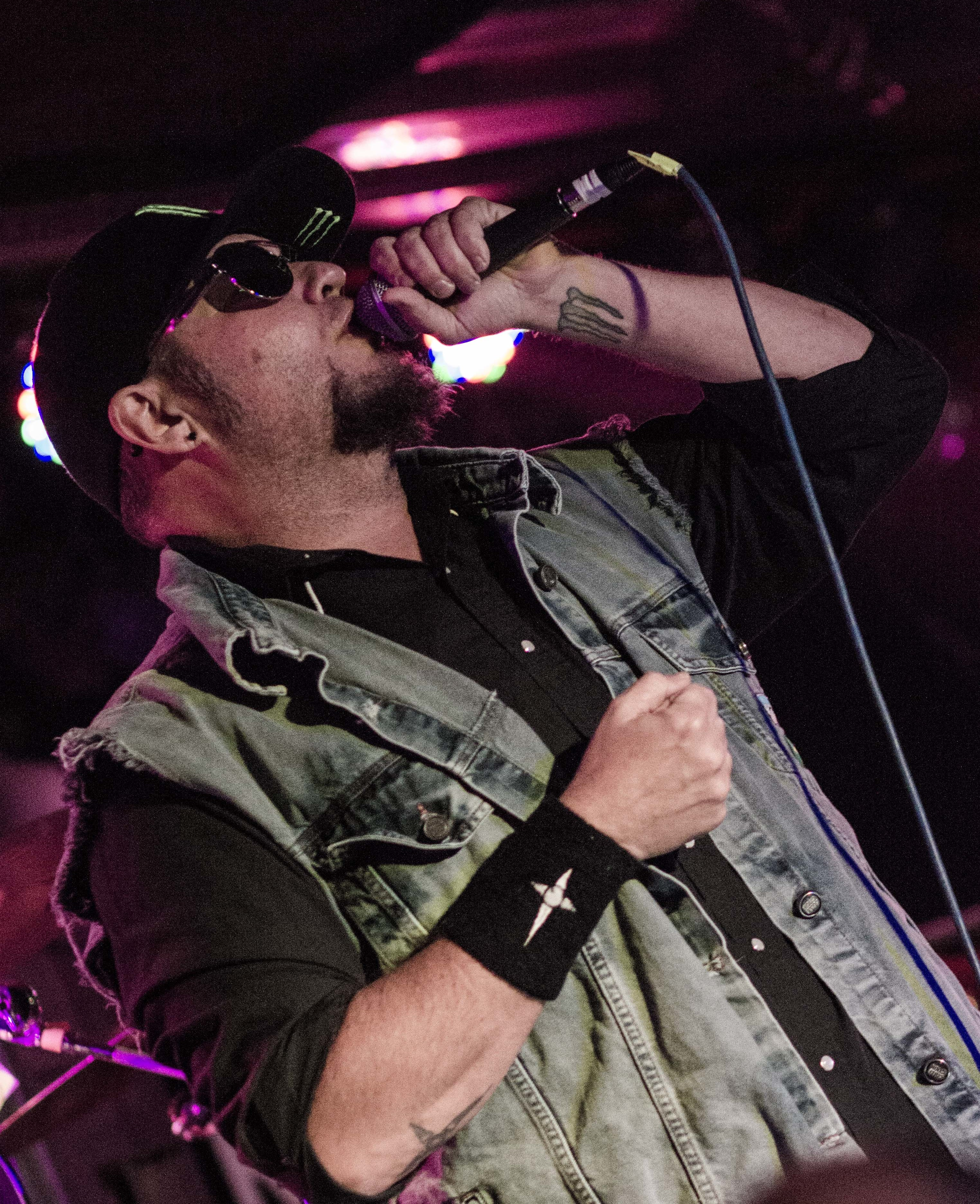
Demolition is the second and final Judas Priest album with vocalist Tim "Ripper" Owens.

In 2018, Tim "Ripper" Owens pledged to re-record this album and its predecessor Jugulator as he feels that his era of the band has "been erased". Ever since Rob Halford rejoined the band, songs from both albums have been left off the band's concert setlists, although Halford stated that he is not opposed to performing the songs live.

Guitarist Richie Faulkner cites "Hell Is Home" as his favourite song, "It's really heavy and the vocal melody is really great. I think Ripper sings it really well. It's probably one of my favorite Priest songs of the Ripper era. 'Hell Is Home' — I really like that."

== Songwriting and production ==
The album was produced by guitarist Glenn Tipton, who also took over as the primary songwriter. The band's main songwriting team had long consisted of Rob Halford, K. K. Downing, and Tipton. After Halford departed, however, Downing and Tipton wrote all the songs on Jugulator. On this album, many of the songs were written solely by Tipton, with contributions from Downing on several songs. Former producer Chris Tsangarides, who cowrote "A Touch of Evil" on Painkiller, also assisted in the writing of a few songs. Drummer Scott Travis cowrote "Cyberface" – his only contribution to writing in the band's history. (Les Binks was Priest's only other drummer to cowrite a song.) This was the first album since Painkiller to feature a guest appearance by keyboardist Don Airey, who had played on "A Touch of Evil."

"People will wonder if a new Priest album is as good as any of the fifteen that came before it," Tipton acknowledged. "I'm confident they'll think this one is. It has some manic, hooligan tracks, like 'Machine Man' and 'Bloodsuckers', as well as a typical 'Ripper' song in 'Jekyll and Hyde'.

The songs "Machine Man" and "Feed on Me" were included in Judas Priest's box set Metalogy.

== Track listing ==
No.	Title	Writer(s)	Length
1.	"Machine Man"	Glenn Tipton	5:35
2.	"One on One"	K. K. Downing, Tipton	6:44
3.	"Hell Is Home"	Downing, Tipton	6:18
4.	"Jekyll and Hyde"	Tipton	3:19
5.	"Close to You"	Downing, Tipton	4:28
6.	"Devil Digger"	Tipton	4:45
7.	"Bloodsuckers"	Downing, Tipton	6:18
8.	"In Between"	Tipton	5:41
9.	"Feed on Me"	Tipton	5:28
10.	"Subterfuge"	Tipton, Chris Tsangarides	5:12
11.	"Lost and Found"	Downing, Tipton	4:57
12.	"Cyberface"	Tipton, Scott Travis	6:45
13.	"Metal Messiah"	Tipton, Tsangarides	5:14
Total length:			70:44

Bonus tracks on Digipak pressing
No.	Title	Writer(s)	Length
14.	"Rapid Fire" (Re-recorded version)	Rob Halford, Downing, Tipton	3:53
15.	"The Green Manalishi" (Re-recorded version)	Peter Green	4:09
Total length:			78:46

Bonus tracks on Australian pressing
No.	Title	Writer(s)	Length
14.	"What's My Name" (also bonus track on Japanese pressing)	Owens, Downing, Tipton	3:45
15.	"The Green Manalishi" (Re-recorded version)	Green	4:09
16.	"Rapid Fire" (Re-recorded version)	Halford, Downing, Tipton	3:53
Total length:			82:31

== Personnel ==
Judas Priest

- Tim "Ripper" Owens – vocals
- Glenn Tipton – guitars
- K. K. Downing – guitars
- Ian Hill – bass guitar
- Scott Travis – drums

Additional musician

- Don Airey – keyboards

Production

- Produced and arranged by Glenn Tipton; co-produced by Sean Lynch
- Mastered by Jon Astley
- Front cover and booklet by L-Space Design
- Back cover image by Benjamin Davies
- Photography by Mick Hutson

== Charts ==
Chart (2001)	Peak position
Austrian Albums (Ö3 Austria)	50
French Albums (SNEP)	72
German Albums (Offizielle Top 100)	16
Japanese Albums (Oricon)	22
Swedish Albums (Sverigetopplistan)	55
Swiss Albums (Schweizer Hitparade)	72
US Billboard 200	165
