= Irvine Meadows Amphitheatre =

Former amphitheatre in Irvine, California

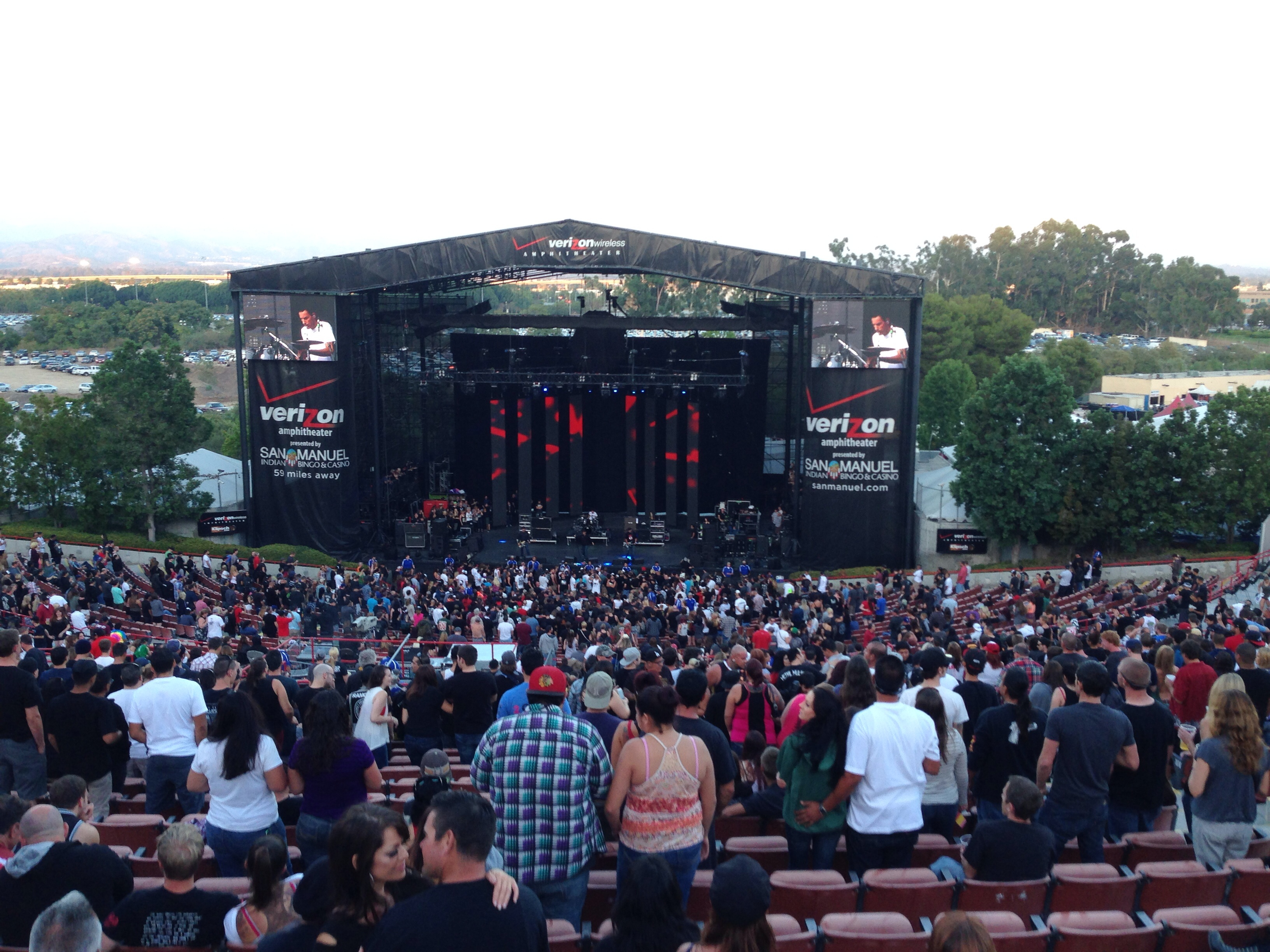
- Venue during Epicenter 2013
- Interactive map of Irvine Meadows Amphitheatre
- Former names: Irvine Meadows Amphitheatre (1981-99; 2014-16); Verizon Wireless Amphitheater (2000-14)
- Address: 8808 Irvine Center Drive; Irvine, CA 92618
- Coordinates: 33°38′15″N 117°44′59″W
- Owner: Irvine Company
- Operator: Live Nation
- Seating type: Reserved seating, lawn seating
- Capacity: 16,085
- Type: Amphitheatre

Construction
- Opened: August 21, 1981
- Closed: October 30, 2016
- Demolished: Late 2016

Website
- livenation.com

Irvine Meadows Amphitheatre (later known as Verizon Wireless Amphitheater) was an amphitheater operating from 1981 to 2016 in Irvine, California.

== History ==
The venue was built in 1980, funded by four local private investors under the Irvine Meadows Partnership. Providing 10,418 reserved seats, and 5,667 on the lawn seating, the outdoor arena was the largest amphitheater in Orange County until its final closure. The architecture was designed by Gin Wong Associates, based in Los Angeles. Built on a hillside, the venue's unique design created a natural steep slope toward the stage.

The site was previously part of Lion Country Safari, one of seven such parks located in the United States. The owner of the safari park held a 29-year lease, and subleased a portion to the owners of the Irvine Meadows Amphitheatre in 1981. The safari park closed in 1984, with the owner still holding 13 years on the lease, which he then subleased to the operators of the Wild Rivers water park and the Camp Frasier (later Camp James) summer camp, which became the neighbors of the Irvine Meadows Amphitheatre. The water park and summer camp closed in 2011, with the land turned into a housing development by the Irvine Company.

The amphitheatre was famous for hosting popular music festivals, including Area2 Festival, Fishfest, Gigantour, Lilith Fair, Lollapalooza, Projekt Revolution and Uproar Festival, a benefit concert for the recently deceased Social Distortion guitarist Dennis Danell. Since 1987, the establishment was the summer home of the Pacific Symphony Orchestra, as well as the annual KROQ Weenie Roast.

Because of the 1993 opening of the Arrowhead Pond of Anaheim (now Honda Center), Irvine Meadows increasingly became an alternative to the much larger Pond, in addition to being a venue for amphitheater tours. Live Nation (formerly SFX Entertainment) bought the lease on the Amphitheatre in 1998.

=== New ownership ===
The Amphitheatre was renamed to the Verizon Wireless Amphitheater in April 2000. The 7-year sponsorship deal between Verizon Wireless and SFX Entertainment, then owner of the amphitheatre, was a multimillion-dollar contract. Verizon renewed this contract for another 7 years, extending it to 2014, but did not opt to renew a second time, and the name reverted to the original Irvine Meadows Amphitheatre moniker in 2015. Gwen Stefani was the last performer at the venue on October 29 and 30, 2016.

=== Closure ===
The Irvine Company had informed the operators of the amphitheatre that the land lease would not be renewed after 2016, so the amphitheatre was closed and demolition started in November 2016, shortly after the final concert. The Irvine Company chose to build housing on the terrain, such that the entire space of the original Irvine-based Lion Country Safari Park would become a 3,700-unit housing development. The Andalucia neighborhood now occupies the site of the former amphitheatre, with nearby neighborhoods of Laguna Alturra and Los Olivos also in the immediate vicinity.

Live Nation and FivePoint built a temporary amphitheatre at the Orange County Great Park named FivePoint Amphitheatre in 2017, for a limited term of three years, based on the Conditional Use Permit process.

== Notable events ==
=== 1980s ===
Tom Petty and the Heartbreakers were the first rock act to perform there, on September 18, 1981. They were joined onstage by surprise guest Stevie Nicks, who performed "Stop Draggin' My Heart Around" with the band. Ozzy Osbourne recorded a performance called Speak of the Devil at the venue on June 12, 1982, for home video release in Japan, later released on DVD in the US in 2012.

Queen performed on September 11, 1982. This was Taylor Hawkins's first-ever concert, which inspired him to be a drummer.

The Grateful Dead performed at the amphitheatre fifteen times from 1983 through 1989, and the Jerry Garcia Band played a further four times from 1984 through 1994.

Oingo Boingo played its annual Halloween concerts at the venue, from 1986 through 1991, and one final time in 1993, before moving the remaining 1994 and 1995 shows to Universal Amphitheatre in Los Angeles. Tangerine Dream performed on June 6, 1986, captured on the illicit recording Somnambulistic Imagery. The Smiths performed on August 28 of that year on their The Queen Is Dead tour. Bon Jovi performed for three consecutive nights on their Slippery When Wet tour, from June 20–22, 1987. Michael Jackson performed three concerts at the amphitheatre from November 7–9, 1988, during his Bad tour. Metallica performed for three nights on their ...And Justice for All tour from September 21–23, 1989.

New Order (band) also played at the venue five times between 1985 and 1989, the two most notable gigs being on September 12, 1987, when they played the entirety of the singles compilation album Substance 1987 for the main set, before encoring with the Joy Division songs Atmosphere (Joy Division song) and Love Will Tear Us Apart, and a cover of Sister Ray by The Velvet Underground, and June 16, 1989 while touring the Technique (album) album, with the whole set being dedicated to Pete de Freitas of Echo & the Bunnymen, who had died in a motorcycle accident on June 14, 1989.

=== 1990s ===
Rush performed on June 29, 1990, for the band's Presto tour. Judas Priest, Alice Cooper, Motörhead, Dangerous Toys and Metal Church performed together on July 12, 1991 as part of the Operation Rock & Roll tour. Glenn Danzig and his solo band Danzig and White Zombie performed a Halloween concert in 1992 that sold out that none of the big commercial bands could sell out with people outside of the venue dancing around bonfires. Depeche Mode also appeared at the venue on May 20, 1994, as part of their USA Summer Tour '94. The Eagles performed on six consecutive nights, from May 27 – June 1, 1994, for their Hell Freezes Over reunion tour. In 1996, Kiss performed at the Irvine Meadows Amphitheatre as part of their highly anticipated reunion tour, Alive/Worldwide, featuring the original lineup: Paul Stanley, Gene Simmons, Ace Frehley and Peter Criss. The show at Irvine served as a warm-up event, taking place on June 15 during the KROQ Weenie Roast. It marked the first performance of the band in their iconic makeup and costumes since the late 1970s. Prince and the New Power Generation performed during their Jam of the Year Tour on October 12, 1997. Phish performed two single-night engagements in 1999 and 2000.

=== 2000s ===
Britney Spears performed to a sold out crowd on her Oops!... I Did It Again World Tour on July 29th, 2000. Iron Maiden, Motörhead and Dio performed on August 24, 2003, while Mars was vividly visible to the audience against the backdrop of the stage. Dream Theater and Megadeth performed on July 24, 2005. Kelly Clarkson performed on August 1, 2006, during her Addicted Tour. After the show, she wrote the song "Irvine" at the venue, later released as a hidden track on her 2007 album My December. Miley Cyrus performed in October 2008 for the promotional show of the series Hannah Montana.

=== 2010s ===
Fall Out Boy performed on March 26, 2016, during their Winter Is Coming Tour. Bernie Sanders hosted a political rally at the venue on May 22 of that year. Fifth Harmony performed on September 9, 2016, during their 7/27 Tour.

== See also ==
- List of contemporary amphitheatres
