= Painkiller (Judas Priest album) =

- Cover art by Mark Wilkinson

Studio album by Judas Priest
- Released: 17 September 1990
- Recorded: January–March 1990
- Studios: Miraval Studios, Correns, France and Wisseloord Studios, Hilversum, Netherlands
- Genres: Heavy metal; speed metal
- Length: 45:52
- Label: Columbia
- Producers: Chris Tsangarides; Judas Priest

Judas Priest chronology
Ram It Down (1988)	Painkiller (1990)	Jugulator (1997)

Singles from Painkiller
- 1. "Painkiller" Released: 3 September 1990; 2. "A Touch of Evil" Released: 11 March 1991

Rob Halford chronology
Ram It Down (1988)	Painkiller (1990)	War of Words (1993)

Painkiller is the twelfth studio album by English heavy metal band Judas Priest, released on 17 September 1990 in Europe and on and 18 September in the United States. The album was released following the band's highly publicised 1990 subliminal messages trial earlier that year, in which frontman Rob Halford and the band were cleared of civil charges and found not liable for the attempted suicides of two young men in December 1985 relating to the band's music.

Painkiller was the last Judas Priest album to feature long-time vocalist Halford until his return for the 2005 album Angel of Retribution and the first to feature drummer Scott Travis.

== Recording and music ==
Painkiller is the first Judas Priest album to feature drummer Scott Travis, who replaced long-time drummer Dave Holland in 1989. Travis was previously a member of Los Angeles band Racer X and with his heavy use of double kicks, Travis gave Judas Priest a new sound and heavier edge. Painkiller was described as heavy metal and, due to its relatively intense sound and faster tempos, speed metal.

The album was recorded at Miraval Studios, Brignoles, France in early 1990 and mixed at Wisseloord Studios, Hilversum, the Netherlands later that year. It was produced by the band and Chris Tsangarides, marking the first time since 1978's Killing Machine that Judas Priest had not worked with Tom Allom and the first time since 1976's Sad Wings of Destiny that Judas Priest and Tsangarides worked together.

Don Airey was brought in to play keyboards on "A Touch of Evil". In a 2020 interview, Airey stated that he also doubled most of the album's bass parts on a Minimoog synthesizer.

== Release ==
Despite the album being finished in March 1990, the album's release was delayed due to the pending, much-publicized subliminal message trial that began on 16 July 1990. The band was the subject of a civil lawsuit alleging their recording was responsible for the suicide attempts of two young men in Reno, Nevada on 23 December 1985. The case was eventually dismissed on 24 August 1990. With the trial behind them, the band finally released the album on 17 September 1990 on LP, cassette and CD.

The album was certified Gold by RIAA in January 1991. A remastered CD was released in May 2001, including a live recording of "Leather Rebel" and a previously unreleased song, "Living Bad Dreams". The album received a Grammy nomination for Best Metal Performance at the 33rd Annual Grammy Awards, losing to Metallica's cover of the Queen song "Stone Cold Crazy".

In 2025 the album was remastered by Tom Allom and Matt Colton for a 35th anniversary reissue.

== Reception ==
Professional ratings
Review scores
Source	Rating
AllMusic	4/5 stars
The Rolling Stone Album Guide	3/5 stars
Sputnikmusic	5/5
Record Collector	4/5 stars
The Great Rock Discography	8/10
Select	3/5 medals
Encyclopedia of Popular Music	3/5 stars
NME	3/10

Critical reaction to Painkiller has been positive. Steve Huey of AllMusic, praised the album, saying that it was one of Judas Priest's best albums in years adding that "Travis' thunderous (and crisp-sounding) percussive maelstrom lights an immediate fire under the bandmembers' asses; Glenn Tipton and K.K. Downing tear through a crushing, diabolical riff; and Rob Halford starts shrieking like a wicked witch, giving perhaps the most malevolent-sounding performance of his career. It's a startling statement of musical purpose that arrived seemingly out of nowhere, heralding a comeback that rivals George Foreman's." Mikesn of Sputnikmusic gave the album a 5 out of 5, stating that "Painkiller is full of many memorable riffs and leads from Glenn and K.K. Among the finest moments of the album come from the intense riffing combined with Halford's wailing vocals. The songs found on Painkiller are very energetic from start to finish, and each member seems to feed off each other's performances."

Most of the album's tracks were performed live on the Painkiller World Tour, with the title track becoming one of the band's concert staples. "Hell Patrol", "All Guns Blazing", "A Touch of Evil", "Night Crawler" and "Between the Hammer and the Anvil" have all returned to the setlist on later tours, while "Metal Meltdown" and "Leather Rebel" were retired after only a few performances in 1990. "One Shot at Glory" and its intro "Battle Hymn" were the only songs on the album that had not been played live until August 2021, when they were added in the band's setlist at the Bloodstock Open Air festival.

Guitarist Richie Faulkner spoke highly regarding the album, "the guitar playing on that record is stunning, as we all know: "Painkiller," "One Shot at Glory," "Hell Patrol." All those tracks are relentless guitar playing, like a master, you put that on, learn that and you've probably got everything down in your toolbox for a heavy metal guitar."

== Rob Halford's departure ==
Following the tour for this album, singer Rob Halford left the band in May 1992 and maintained little contact with his former bandmates throughout the 1990s. The reason for this was growing tensions within the band, along with Halford's desire to explore new musical territory by creating a new band of his own, Fight. Contractually, Halford was required to leave Judas Priest to allow sales of any Fight material. Judas Priest remained inactive for several years after Halford had gone; however, the band would eventually re-vamp, record, and tour, recruiting new singer Tim "Ripper" Owens in 1996, who would perform on the studio albums Jugulator and Demolition.

== Track listing ==
All tracks are written by Glenn Tipton, Rob Halford and K. K. Downing, except "A Touch of Evil" by Tipton, Halford, Downing and Chris Tsangarides.

Side one
No.	Title	Length
1.	"Painkiller"	6:06
2.	"Hell Patrol"	3:35
3.	"All Guns Blazing"	3:56
4.	"Leather Rebel"	3:34
5.	"Metal Meltdown"	4:46

Side two
No.	Title	Length
6.	"Night Crawler"	5:44
7.	"Between the Hammer & the Anvil"	4:47
8.	"A Touch of Evil"	5:42
9.	"Battle Hymn" (instrumental)	0:56
10.	"One Shot at Glory"	6:46
Total length:		45:52

2001 bonus tracks
No.	Title	Length
11.	"Living Bad Dreams" (Recorded during the 1990 Painkiller sessions)	5:20
12.	"Leather Rebel" (Live at Foundation's Forum, Los Angeles, California, 13 September 1990)	3:38
Total length:		54:50

== Personnel ==
Personnel taken from Painkiller liner notes, except where noted.

Judas Priest

- Rob Halford – vocals
- K. K. Downing – guitars
- Glenn Tipton – guitars
- Scott Travis – drums
- Ian Hill – bass (credited but may not actually appear)

Lead guitar credits

- "Painkiller" – middle of song: Tipton, end of song: Downing
- "Hell Patrol" – first half of lead break: Downing, second half of lead break: Tipton
- "All Guns Blazing" – all leads: Tipton
- "Leather Rebel" – Tipton & Downing together, runs at end of lead break by Downing
- "Metal Meltdown" – intro first half: Downing, intro second half: Tipton, first section of lead break: Downing, second section of lead break: Tipton, third section of lead break: Downing, fourth section of lead break: Tipton
- "Night Crawler" – Tipton & Downing together
- "Between the Hammer & the Anvil" – first half of lead break: Downing, second half of lead break: Tipton
- "Touch of Evil" – All leads: Tipton
- "One Shot at Glory" – Entry lick: Tipton, second verse entry lick: Downing, first section of lead break: Downing, second section of lead break: Tipton, third section of lead break: both, outro: Tipton

Additional musician

- Don Airey – keyboards on "A Touch of Evil" and "Living Bad Dreams"; Minimoog bass on all other songs (uncredited for the latter)

Production

- Produced by Judas Priest and Chris Tsangarides
- Engineered by Attie Bauw and Patrice Rouillon
- Equipment management by Tom Calcaterra
- Recorded and mixed by Tipton, Halford, Downing, and Tsangarides
- Remastered by Jon Astley (2001 reissue)
- Cover illustration by Mark Wilkinson, based on an original concept by Judas Priest
- Original graphics by Peacock Marketing & Design

== Charts ==
Chart (1990)	Peak position
Australian Albums (ARIA)	60
Austrian Albums (Ö3 Austria)	22
Canada Top Albums/CDs (RPM)	29
Finnish Albums (The Official Finnish Charts)	15
German Albums (Offizielle Top 100)	7
Japanese Albums (Oricon)	13
New Zealand Albums (RMNZ)	27
Norwegian Albums (VG-lista)	19
Swedish Albums (Sverigetopplistan)	19
Swiss Albums (Schweizer Hitparade)	14
UK Albums (Official Charts)	26
US Billboard 200	26

== Certifications ==
Region	Certification	Certified units/sales
Canada (Music Canada)	Gold	50,000^{^}
Japan (RIAJ) 1996 release	Gold	100,000^{^}
United States (RIAA)	Gold	500,000^{^}
^{^} Shipments figures based on certification alone.
