= Hellacious Acres =

Studio album by Dangerous Toys
- Released: June 4, 1991
- Recorded: November 1990–February 1991
- Studios: Village Recorder, Santa Monica, AT Track Record, North Hollywood, Summa Music Group, West Hollywood, California
- Genres: Glam metal, heavy metal
- Length: 46:43
- Label: Columbia
- Producer: Roy Thomas Baker

Dangerous Toys chronology
Dangerous Toys (1989)	Hellacious Acres (1991)	Pissed (1994)

Singles from Hellacious Acres
- 1. "Gimme No Lip" Released: 1991; 2. "Line 'Em Up" Released: 1991

Professional ratings
Review scores
Source	Rating
AllMusic	3/5 stars
Classic Rock	6/10 stars
The Collector's Guide to Heavy Metal	6/10

Hellacious Acres is the second album by heavy metal band Dangerous Toys, released in 1991. It was produced by Roy Thomas Baker, and includes a cover of Bad Company's "Feel Like Makin' Love", while "Line 'Em Up" and "Gimme' No Lip" were released as singles to promote the album. This is Dangerous Toys' last album to be released on Columbia Records, and the only album that guitarist Danny Aaron played on, as he left the band during the 1991-1992 Hellacious Acres tour.

== Track listing ==
All music is composed by Dangerous Toys.

No.	Title	Lyrics	Length
1.	"Gunfighter"	Jason McMaster	4:48
2.	"Gimme No Lip"	McMaster, Mike Watson	3:32
3.	"Sticks & Stones"	McMaster, Watson	3:14
4.	"Best of Friends"	Watson	5:22
5.	"On Top"	McMaster	4:17
6.	"Sugar, Leather & The Nail"	McMaster	3:18
7.	"Angel N U"	McMaster	6:55
8.	"Feel Like Makin' Love" (Bad Company cover)	Paul Rodgers, Mick Ralphs	4:34
9.	"Line 'Em Up"	McMaster	3:00
10.	"Gypsy (Black-n-Blue Valentine)"	McMaster, Watson, Jack Ponti, Vic Pepe	4:09
11.	"Bad Guy"	McMaster	3:34

== Personnel ==
Dangerous Toys

- Jason McMaster - lead vocals
- Scott Dalhover - lead guitar
- Mike Watson - bass, backing vocals
- Danny Aaron - rhythm guitar, slide guitar, backing vocals
- Mark Geary - drums

Additional musicians

- Waste 'O' Skin Choir - gang vocals on "Sticks & Stones"
  - Brian Baker, Chris Gates, Michael Hannon, David Roach, George Dolivo, Greg Fields, Andy Rogers, Vickie James Wright, Chris Andrada, Mitch Dean

Production

- Roy Thomas Baker - production
- Timm Baldwin - engineering
- Rick Ornstien, Ken Pavlakovich, Jim Champagne, Scott Blockland - assistant engineering
- George Marino - mastering at Sterling Sound, NYC

== Charts ==
Chart (1991)	Peak position
US Billboard 200	67
