= Dangerous Toys =

American rock band

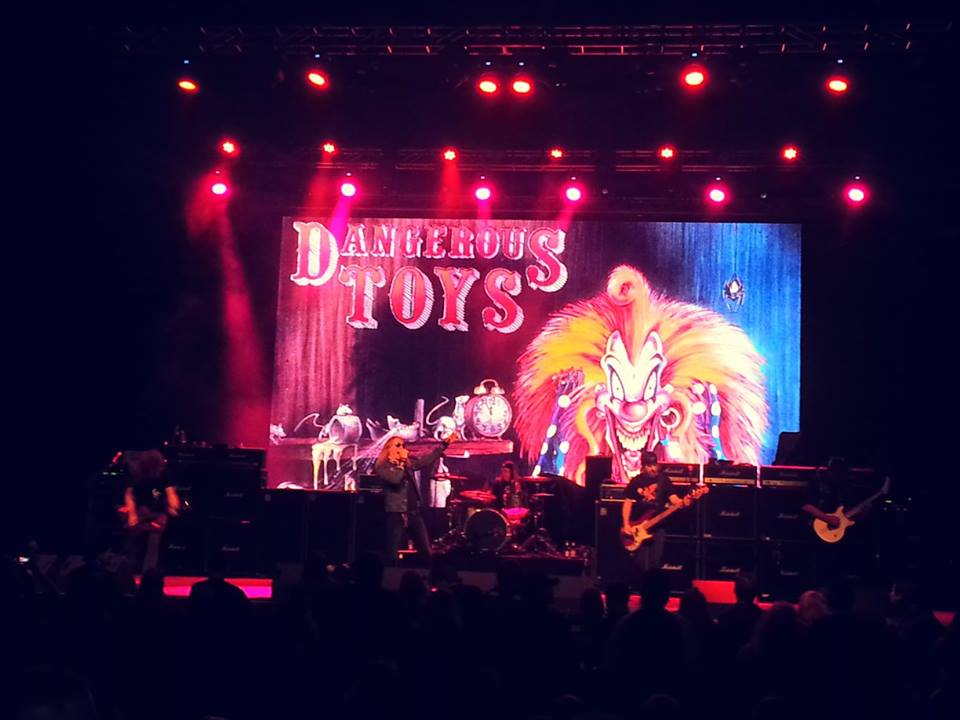

Background information
- Also known as: Onyxx (1987–1988)
- Origin: Austin, Texas, United States
- Genres: Hard rock; glam metal; Southern rock; Southern metal; Grunge
- Years active: 1987–present
- Labels: Columbia; DOS; DMZ; EMP Label Group
- Spinoff of: Watchtower
- Members: Jason McMaster; Scott Dalhover; Mark Geary; Paul Lidel; Mike Watson
- Past members: Tim Trembley; Danny Aaron; Kevin Fowler; Michael Hannon
- Website: dangeroustoys.us

Dangerous Toys is an Austin, Texas-based rock band, formed in 1987. Their original lineup included frontman Jason McMaster (previously of Watchtower), lead guitarist Scott Dalhover, rhythm guitarist Tim Trembly, bassist Mike Watson and drummer Mark Geary. After Trembly left in 1988, they cycled through a number of rhythm guitarists, including Danny Aaron and Kevin Fowler, before Paul Lidel (formerly of Dirty Looks) was hired in 1994. In stark contrast to most of their glam metal peers, the band, as RockLists.com put it, "played hard rock with a wink, the lyrics often good for a laugh."

Dangerous Toys released four full-length albums and one live album before unofficially disbanding at the turn of the millennium. The band found mainstream success with its debut album Dangerous Toys (1989), which featured the singles "Teas'n, Pleas'n" and "Scared" and it was certified gold by the RIAA five years after its release. Their next two albums, Hellacious Acres (1991) and Pissed (1994), were not as successful as the self-titled debut, but also received acclaim. The commercial failure and poor reception of the band's fourth album The R*tist 4*merly Known as Dangerous Toys (1995) led the band to go on hiatus. Dangerous Toys resurfaced in 1999, and has since continued as mostly a live act, although they have occasionally been hinting at an upcoming fifth studio album.

== History ==
=== Formation, Dangerous Toys and Hellacious Acres (1987–1991) ===
Dangerous Toys was formed in October 1987. Jason McMaster of progressive metal band, Watchtower was invited by Tim Trembley to join his band, Onyxx, as its singer. Onyxx included Scott Dalhover (guitar), Mark Geary (drums) and Mike Watson (bass).

In 1988, now calling themselves Dangerous Toys, the band was signed to Columbia Records, after a publishing representative had signed them to a deal in March at South by Southwest. Soon afterwards Tim Trembley left the band and they were without a second guitarist. On their eponymous debut album, which was produced by Max Norman (Megadeth, Ozzy Osbourne), Scott Dalhover played all the guitar tracks. Shortly before its release, guitarist Danny Aaron joined; despite not playing on the album, he appears on the back cover. Released in May 1989, Dangerous Toys gave the band its major breakthrough, peaking at number 65 on the Billboard 200, receiving gold certification by the RIAA, and the singles "Teas'n Pleas'n" and "Scared" enjoying heavy rotation on MTV's Headbangers Ball. Dangerous Toys toured worldwide in support of the album during 1989 and 1990, performing from clubs to arenas and amphitheaters with such acts as The Cult, L.A. Guns, Stryper, Faster Pussycat, The Almighty, Bonham and Junkyard.

Dangerous Toys also contributed to a song on the soundtrack for the 1989 Wes Craven movie Shocker, "Demon Bell (The Ballad of Horace Pinker)".

In 1991, their second album, Hellacious Acres, was released. It was produced by Roy Thomas Baker, who had produced albums for several major rock artists (The Cars, Queen, Journey), and featured the singles "Sticks and Stones" and "Line 'Em Up"; videos were shot for both of them and received some airplay on Headbangers Ball. However, the singles did not chart and the album was not as successful as the self-titled debut, ending up at number 67 on the Billboard 200 chart. Shortly after embarking on the Operation Rock & Roll tour with Judas Priest, Alice Cooper, Motörhead and Metal Church, Dangerous Toys was dropped from Columbia.

=== Lineup changes, Pissed and The R*tist 4*merly Known as Dangerous Toys (1992–1998) ===
In 1992, guitarist Danny Aaron left the band and was replaced by Kevin Fowler. Fowler never played on a Dangerous Toys album, but he did tour with the band - performing in over 200 live shows during 1993. In January 1994, Paul Lidel of Dirty Looks, a hard rock band from Erie, Pennsylvania, replaced Fowler.

The third Dangerous Toys album, Pissed (DMZ/Dos/Antones [USA], Bullet Proof [Europe]. 1994), was full of pent up anger, bile, and venom. The band's lyrics and attitude became harsher and the music had a darker tone, with song titles like "Loser" and "Hard Luck Champion."

In 1994, just after they finished recording the Pissed album, bassist Mike Watson was replaced by Michael Hannon from Salty Dog (Geffen). Hannon toured with the band, performing in over 200 shows during 1994 and 1995.

After touring, Hannon left, so Jason McMaster played bass in addition to performing lead vocals. The band considered changing their name, but stuck with Dangerous Toys, even poking fun at their name on the title of their fourth (and final) studio album to date; The R*tist 4*merly Known as Dangerous Toys (DMZ/Dos/Antones. 1995). The humor backfired: fan reaction was not favorable and the album barely sold.

=== Subsequent activities (1999–2017) ===
In 1999, Dangerous Toys released a live album, Vitamins and Crash Helmets Tour-Live Greatest Hits (Deadline/Cleopatra). After that, band activity slowed.

Singer Jason McMaster performs in various Austin-based rock-bands, including Sad Wings, Capricorn USA, and Broken Teeth a band formed in 1999 with Dangerous Toys guitarist Paul Lidel. Lidel left Broken Teeth in 2006 and now writes and performs with Adrenaline Factor, Jokerville, 99 Crimes and Scream Therapy. Lidel is also a music instructor who trains future would-be guitar rockstars. Drummer Mark Geary and bassist Mike Watson record and perform in an Austin-based heavy metal band called Proof of Life.

In 2001, they played a few shows in their hometown of Austin, Texas and in Tokyo, Japan, rejoined by their original bassist, Mike Watson. They reunited for another set of live shows in Austin and Tokyo during February 2003, Austin in May 2005, and at Bat Fest (an annual Austin event) with Rhino Bucket in September 2006. Portions of the 2006 show were recorded and initially intended for release as XX, a 20-year career retrospective CD/DVD. The XX project was postponed indefinitely in mid-2007. The band was also rumored to be working on a new album during this period, but nothing has come out of it.

In 2006, "Teas'n, Pleas'n" was covered by Shadows Fall on their compilation album Fallout from the War, featuring guest vocals from Toys' vocalist Jason McMaster.

In 2007, Dangerous Toys recorded a cover of Lynyrd Skynyrd's hit song "Simple Man" for An All Star Tribute to Lynyrd Skynyrd (Deadline/Cleopatra). Also in 2007, they performed an unannounced short set at the end of a show featuring the member's current bands (Adrenaline Factor, Proof of Life and Broken Teeth).

In 2008, they performed a handful of shows. Most notable was a 20th Anniversary show in Austin on November 8, with all original band members.

In March 2012, McMaster married photographer Kate Patten in a private ceremony in West Hollywood, California.

In 2017, it was announced that Dangerous Toys had signed a deal with EMP Label Group, the label of Megadeth bassist David Ellefson to reissue remastered versions of several of the band's catalog releases including Pissed, The R*tist 4*merly Known as Dangerous Toys, and XX: Live. Pissed was re-released on September 8, 2017 on vinyl LP, picture disc, and CD.

=== Potential fifth studio album (2018–present) ===
Though not a full-time ongoing band, Dangerous Toys is still active to this day, performing at least one live show every year. McMaster had stated in interviews there would be no new material under the Dangerous Toys name, but would never rule it out.

Despite McMaster's previous statements, Dangerous Toys guitarist Scott Dalhover revealed on his Facebook page in September 2018 that he was working on demos with him for what will be the band's fifth studio album. During their performance at the Rocklanta festival in Atlanta on March 30, 2019, they performed their first song in 24 years "Hold Your Horses". When asked in June 2022 about the status of the new Dangerous Toys album, guitarist Paul Lidel said, "I'm really excited about the new Dangerous Toys songs! I think they have the vibe of the first Dangerous Toys album, along with sort of a Van Halen meets Aerosmith, meets ZZ Top kind of thing too. Recording has begun but is going very slowly because of logistics. Everyone lives far apart." Dalhover announced on his Facebook page on August 22, 2025 that the band was going to release two new albums in 2026; as of November 2026, however, there have been no updates on those upcoming albums.

Dangerous Toys released Demolition, an album of unreleased recordings dating back to the late 1980s and early 1990s, on December 12, 2025.

== Members ==
=== Current ===
- Jason McMaster – lead vocals (1987–present), bass (1995–2001)
- Scott Dalhover – lead guitar (1987–present)
- Mark Geary – drums (1987–present)
- Paul Lidel – rhythm guitar (1994–present)
- Mike Watson – bass (1987–1994, 2001–present)

=== Former ===
- Tim Trembly – rhythm guitar (1987–1988)
- Danny Aaron – rhythm guitar (1989–1992)
- Kevin Fowler – rhythm guitar (1992–1994)
- Michael Hannon – bass (1994–1995)

== Discography ==
=== Studio albums ===
Year	Title	Label	Billboard Album Chart peak position	Weeks on chart	RIAA certifications
1989	Dangerous Toys	Columbia	65	36	Gold
1991	Hellacious Acres	Columbia	67	9	—
1994	Pissed	DOS Records	—	—	—
1995	The R*tist 4*merly Known as Dangerous Toys	DMZ Records	—	—	—

=== Live albums ===
- Vitamins and Crash Helmets Tour – Greatest Hits Live (1999, Cleopatra)

=== Compilation albums ===
- The Ultimate Dangerous Toys – Sleaze Metal Kings from Texas (2004, Deadline)
- Dangerous Toys – Greatest Tricks (2020, Release)
- Demolition (2025, Deadline Music)

=== Singles ===
Year	Title	Peak chart positions	Album
Year	Title	US Main	Album
1989	Teas'n, Pleas'n	—	Dangerous Toys
1989	Scared	46	Dangerous Toys
1990	Sport'n A Woody	—	Dangerous Toys
1991	Gimme No Lip	—	Hellacious Acres
1991	Line 'Em Up	—	Hellacious Acres
2025	Rock Shock Cowboy	—	Demolition

== See also ==
- List of glam metal bands and artists
