= Revolution (Judas Priest song) =

Single by Judas Priest

from the album Angel of Retribution
- Released: 2005
- Recorded: October–December 2004
- Genre: Heavy metal
- Length: 4:42
- Label: Epic
- Songwriter(s): Rob Halford; K. K. Downing; Glenn Tipton
- Producer(s): Roy Z

Judas Priest singles chronology
"Machine Man" (2001)	"Revolution" (2005)	"War" (2008)

"Revolution" is a song on the album Angel of Retribution, by the heavy metal band Judas Priest. It was their first single since 1992's "Night Crawler" to enter in the United States charts. It reached No. 23 in the Mainstream Rock Tracks chart.

According to the producer, Roy Z:

The bass intro to 'Revolution' is actually from a cassette tape the band recorded back in the 1970s. We loaded the riff into Pro Tools and built the rest of the song around it. We went for a raw, modern '70s vibe. It is a wide-open rock and roll song.

K. K. Downing said yet that:

I'm proud of the fact that we really worked hard. The album cover, the message about peoples' perceptions of rock and metal – 'Revolution' with Rob singing, 'Time to change' on the outro – youngsters with aspirations to pick up a guitar, they're listening to the radio thinking, 'Well, that is what I need to be doing ...

It was well received by the fans and it is still played live since its release.

The song has a similar riff to "Mountain Song", by Jane's Addiction.

The song was used in the 2005 intro of All Japan Pro Wrestling's Battle Banquet TV show.

== Chart performance ==
Chart (2005)	Peak position
Billboard Mainstream Rock Chart (US)	23
