= Angel of Retribution =

- Cover art by Mark Wilkinson

Studio album by Judas Priest
- Released: 1 March 2005
- Recorded: April–December 2004
- Studios: Sound City (Van Nuys, California) Old Smithy (Worcestershire, England)
- Genre: Heavy metal
- Length: 52:32
- Labels: Sony BMG; Epic (US)
- Producer: Roy Z

Judas Priest chronology
Demolition (2001)	Angel of Retribution (2005)	Nostradamus (2008)

Singles from Angel of Retribuition
- 1. "Revolution" Released: 2005

Professional ratings
Aggregate scores
Source	Rating
Metacritic	69/100
Review scores
Source	Rating
AllMusic	3/5 stars
Blabbermouth	8/10
laut.de	4/5 stars
Mojo	3/5 stars
Now	2/5 Ns
PopMatters	6/10
Rock Hard (de)	9/10
Rolling Stone	3.5/5 stars
Uncut	3.5/5 stars

Angel of Retribution is the fifteenth studio album by English heavy metal band Judas Priest, released in 2005. It is the band's first album since 1990s Painkiller to feature Rob Halford. The album debuted at No. 13 on the US Billboard 200 chart, which makes it the fourth highest charting Judas Priest album in the US. The album was produced by Roy Z, who co-wrote the song "Deal with the Devil". It won a 2005 Metal Hammer award for Best Album. In the 2005 Burrn! magazine Readers' Pop Poll, it was voted Best Album of the Year and Best Album Cover.

== Album information ==
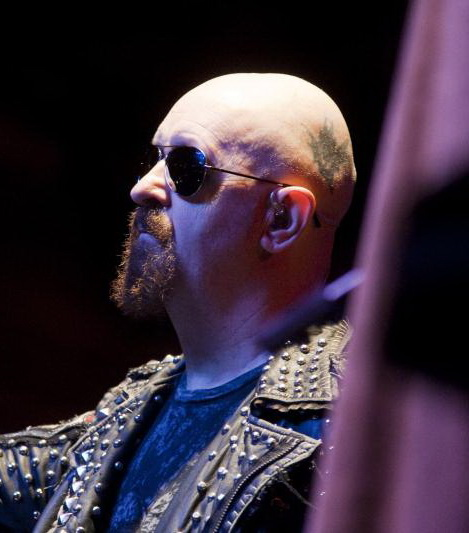
Angel of Retribution marked the return of vocalist Rob Halford.

Angel of Retribution was originally scheduled to be released in late 2004, but the label changed the release date to early 2005, hoping for better sales. Early pressings have the year 2004 printed on the covers. In a descriptive detail about the album, Glenn Tipton explains, "We've got a lot of energy. We're firing on all cylinders and it's obvious on this album. I think it's the most natural JUDAS PRIEST album. A lot of people who have listened to it have said it's timeless. You couldn't really date it." Rob Halford adds, "That decade that we were out of each other's company just seems to have vanished in smoke. When we got together to begin writing the new material for 'Angel of Retribution', it was really a continuation of where we would have been had we made the next record after 'Painkiller'. All the pieces were already in place."

Six of the album's songs have been performed live, with "Hellrider", "Deal With the Devil", "Worth Fighting For" and "Revolution" only appearing on 2005 setlists. "Judas Rising" was also performed in 2005 and returned for the 2011–12 and 2019 tours, and "Angel" being added to the setlist in 2008-9 and then reappearing for a few shows in 2018.

== Lyrical references ==
Within the album, nods to the sound of past albums and songs are found, as well as lyrics that apparently reference earlier songs. The song "Demonizer" references both "The Hellion" from Screaming for Vengeance, as well as "Painkiller" from Painkiller. "Hellrider" mentions the title track of Ram It Down, and "Tyrant" from Sad Wings of Destiny. "Eulogy" references "Stained Class" and "The Sentinel" from the albums Stained Class and Defenders of the Faith, respectively. Finally, "Worth Fighting For" acts as a sequel/prequel to "Desert Plains" from Point of Entry.

The song "Deal With the Devil" can be viewed as an autobiography of Judas Priest, telling their origins from the Black Country of England's West Midlands, mentioning their transitory days gigging around England and practising at the Church of Holy Joseph in Walsall, which is where Judas Priest was effectively born. "Deal With the Devil" also mentions the song "Blood Red Skies" from Ram It Down and "Take on the World" from Killing Machine.

== Reception ==
The album generally received favourable reviews from critics and fans. However, Classic Rock Magazine reviewer Geoff Barton awarded the album three out of five stars in March 2005, dropping the overall score solely due to his dislike of the track '"Lochness". Barton claimed that the track sends 'the entire record crashing down in flames... Lochness is so ill-conceived, so long-drawn out, droning and dismal, that is single-handedly destroys what would otherwise have been a triumphant Halford-led return.' The song, however, has since been reappraised by many fans as underrated.

As 2008, sales for Angel of Retribution reached 500,000 units worldwide, with 184,000 units in the US alone

== DualDisc ==
The album was released on the DualDisc format which had traditional CD content on one side and DVD content on the other side. The DVD side of this album featured a documentary entitled "Reunited" as well as the entire album in an enhanced audio format. It was released as a 2-disc set containing Compact Disc audio and DVD video in Europe, Japan and USA.

== Track listing ==
All tracks are written by Glenn Tipton, Rob Halford and K. K. Downing, except where noted.

No.	Title	Length
1.	"Judas Rising"	4:15
2.	"Deal with the Devil" (Tipton, Halford, Downing, Roy Ramirez)	3:54
3.	"Revolution"	4:42
4.	"Worth Fighting For"	4:17
5.	"Demonizer"	4:35
6.	"Wheels of Fire"	3:41
7.	"Angel"	4:23
8.	"Hellrider"	6:23
9.	"Eulogy"	2:54
10.	"Lochness"	13:28
Total length:		52:32

== Personnel ==
Credits adapted from liner notes:

Judas Priest

- Rob Halford – vocals
- Glenn Tipton – guitars
- K. K. Downing – guitars
- Ian Hill – bass guitar
- Scott Travis – drums

Additional musician

- Don Airey – keyboards

Production

- Produced by Roy Z and Judas Priest
- Engineered by Roy Z, engineered in the US by Joe Barresi
- Mixed by Roy Z and Stan Katayama
- Mastered by Tom Baker from Precision Mastering
- Cover concept by Judas Priest
- Design and illustrations by Mark Wilkinson

Reunited mini documentary (DualDisc edition)

- Produced and directed by Aubrey Powell
- Audio produced and mixed by Tom Allom

== Charts ==
=== Weekly charts ===
Chart (2005)	Peak position
Australian Albums (ARIA)	58
Austrian Albums (Ö3 Austria)	10
Belgian Albums (Ultratop Flanders)	37
Belgian Albums (Ultratop Wallonia)	89
Danish Albums (Hitlisten)	19
Dutch Albums (Album Top 100)	46
French Albums (SNEP)	43
Finnish Albums (Suomen virallinen lista)	6
German Albums (Offizielle Top 100)	5
Hungarian Albums (MAHASZ)	14
Irish Albums (IRMA)	40
Italian Albums (FIMI)	40
Japanese Albums (Oricon)	8
Norwegian Albums (VG-lista)	6
Scottish Albums (Official Charts)	36
Spanish Albums (Promusicae)	6
Swedish Albums (Sverigetopplistan)	3
Swiss Albums (Schweizer Hitparade)	19
UK Albums (Official Charts)	39
UK Rock & Metal Albums (Official Charts)	2
US Billboard 200	13

=== Year-end charts ===
Chart (2005)	Position
Swedish Albums (Sverigetopplistan)	94
