= A Touch of Evil =

Single by Judas Priest

from the album Painkiller
- B-side: "Between the Hammer & the Anvil"
- Released: 11 March 1991
- Recorded: 1990
- Genre: Heavy metal
- Length: 5:42
- Label: Columbia
- Songwriters: Rob Halford; K. K. Downing; Glenn Tipton; Chris Tsangarides
- Producer: Chris Tsangarides

Judas Priest singles chronology
"Painkiller" (1990)	"A Touch of Evil" (1991)	"Night Crawler" (1992)

Music video
- "A Touch of Evil" on YouTube

"A Touch of Evil" is a song by the English heavy metal band Judas Priest, from their 1990 album Painkiller. The record was released as the second single from the album via Columbia Records label.

== Overview ==
It is the only song on the album that was co-written by producer Chris Tsangarides, who wrote the song's guitar riff, while the rest of the song was written by the main songwriting team of Rob Halford, K. K. Downing, and Glenn Tipton. Tsangarides would team up again with Tipton for songwriting eleven years later, for Judas Priest's album Demolition, released in 2001, on which the two of them wrote the songs "Subterfuge" and "Metal Messiah".

It is one of the few songs on the album on which the synthesizers (which had originally been featured on several songs, but had been removed from some) remained part of the song. These synthesizers were played by rock veteran keyboardist Don Airey. Between the slow drums and the eerie keyboards, the song was given a chilling sound, making it a sort of pseudo-ballad. However, when played live, the keyboard intro is replaced by a guitar riff which Glenn plays.

The song's lyrics deal with demonic possession, black magic, and temptation to commit acts of evil. However, according to Halford himself, as cited in Metal Hammer in January 2004, the lyrics deal with a love-related theme, although metaphorically.

The song features a classically inspired guitar solo by Glenn Tipton.

== Personnel ==
Personnel taken from Painkiller liner notes, except where noted.

Judas Priest

- Rob Halford – vocals
- Glenn Tipton – lead guitar
- K. K. Downing – rhythm guitar
- Ian Hill – bass (credited but may not actually appear)
- Scott Travis – drums

with:

- Don Airey – keyboards, Minimoog bass

== Music video ==
A music video was made for the song, vividly depicting each element of the song's lyrics. The video shows a young boy having various visions of things, while flashing images of the band playing the song in between, similar to the way the band are seen in the "Painkiller" video. The song was edited for the music video, and was cut from 5:42 to 4:54, and—among other things—a notable amount of Tipton's guitar solo was cut out from the song.

== Charts ==
Chart (1991)	Peak position
UK Singles (Official Charts)	58
US Mainstream Rock (Billboard)	29
