= Painkiller (Judas Priest song) =

1990 song by Judas Priest

Single by Judas Priest

from the album Painkiller
- Released: 3 September 1990
- Genre: Speed metal
- Length: 6:06
- Label: Columbia
- Songwriters: Rob Halford; K. K. Downing; Glenn Tipton
- Producer: Chris Tsangarides

Judas Priest singles chronology
"Ram It Down" (1988)	"Painkiller" (1990)	"A Touch of Evil" (1991)

Music video
- "Painkiller" on YouTube

Lyric video
- "Painkiller" on YouTube

"Painkiller" is a song by English heavy metal band Judas Priest, released in 1990; it was later released as a single on Columbia Records. It is off the band's twelfth album of the same name as the opening track. The lyrics tell the story of the Painkiller, the character featured on the cover of the album, who is a cyborg superhero who saves mankind from destruction.

"Painkiller" has become one of Judas Priest's most popular songs.

== Composition ==
The drum intro was composed by Scott Travis in the studio initially just as a warm-up routine while the engineers were testing the drum microphones.

Guitarist Glenn Tipton said that the "Painkiller" solo is one of his favorites to perform (the other being the solo on “Beyond the Realms of Death”).

== Reception ==
PopMatters said, "Nobody saw this song coming. Featuring a thunderous intro by new drummer Scott Travis – a colossal improvement over the technically limited Dave Holland – and highlighted by Halford’s maniacal performance, this was Priest embracing extremity without pandering, and sounding once again vital, relevant, and best of all, more powerful than ever."

In 2012, Loudwire ranked the song number two on its list of the 10 greatest Judas Priest songs. In 2019, Louder Sound ranked the song number one on its list of the 50 greatest Judas Priest songs.

== Cover versions ==
Japanese band Babymetal performed an abridged version of the song at the 2016 Alternative Press Music Awards alongside Rob Halford, which led into another Judas Priest song, "Breaking the Law." Babymetal performed these songs later in the year during their tour supporting Red Hot Chili Peppers, with singer Su-metal performing all vocals and RHCP's Chad Smith playing drums.

American death metal band Death covered the song on their album The Sound of Perseverance.

== Personnel ==
Personnel taken from Painkiller liner notes, except where noted.

Judas Priest

- Rob Halford – vocals
- Glenn Tipton – guitar (first solo)
- K. K. Downing – guitar (second solo)
- Ian Hill – bass (credited but may not actually appear)
- Scott Travis – drums

Additional musicians

- Don Airey – Minimoog bass

== Charts ==
Chart (1990–1991)	Peak position
UK Singles (OCC)	74
