= Iced Earth discography =

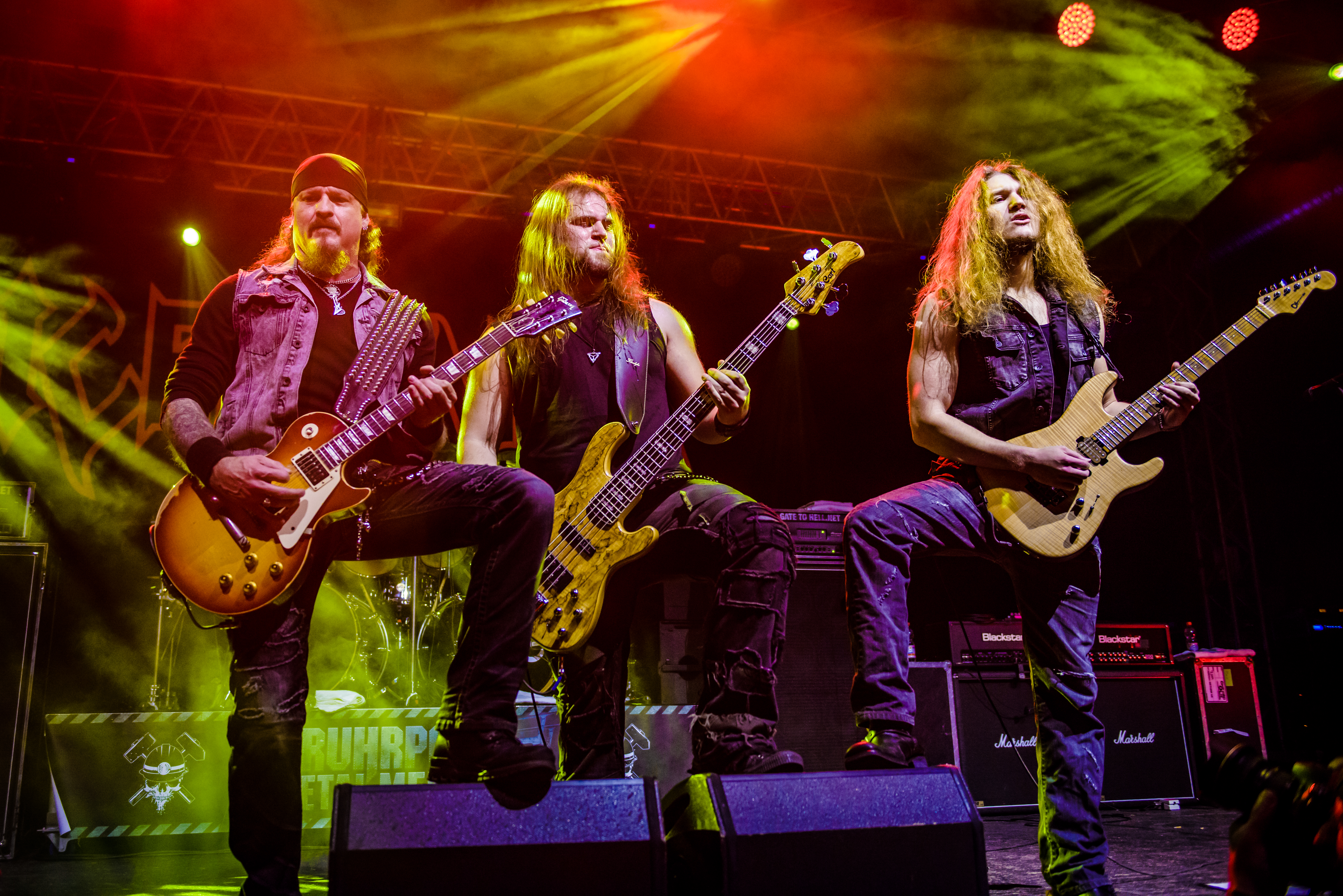
- Iced Earth performing in Germany in 2016
- Studio albums: 12
- Extended plays: 4
- Live albums: 2
- Compilation albums: 3
- Singles: 5
- Video albums: 3
- Music videos: 11
- Box sets: 3

The discography of Iced Earth, an American heavy metal band, consists of thirteen studio releases (twelve original studio albums and one covers album), two live albums, three compilations, five singles, three videos, and eleven music videos. Originally formed as Purgatory by guitarist Jon Schaffer on January 20, 1985, the band spent five years playing live locally and went through several line-up changes. After changing their name to Iced Earth, the band recorded the demo Enter the Realm (1989), which landed them a deal with the German label, Century Media Records. One year later, the band recorded their self-titled album Iced Earth, followed by 1991's Night of the Stormrider, which peaked at number 60 on the Japanese Oricon charts. Three years later, Iced Earth released Burnt Offerings, featuring new vocalist Matt Barlow, followed by The Dark Saga (1996).

In 1997, the band re-recorded the best of their early material, and released it as a compilation titled Days of Purgatory. Released in 1998, Something Wicked This Way Comes reached number 19 on the German Media Control Charts. They followed up with the live album Alive in Athens (1999). In 2001, the band released their sixth full-length Horror Show—which reached the top 30 on the Austrian Ö3 Top 40 and German charts—and later that year, the five-disc box set Dark Genesis, which contained remastered versions of their first three studio albums, the demo Enter the Realm, and seventh studio album, titled Tribute to the Gods. The latter disc was released separately in 2002.

Two years later, Iced Earth signed a deal with SPV, and hired singer Tim "Ripper" Owens to record vocals for The Glorious Burden. The album reached the top 30 in Austria, Finland and Germany. For the first time, the band charted on the American Billboard 200, at number 145. Between 2007 and 2008, the band released two concept albums for the conclusion of the Something Wicked saga. The first part, titled Framing Armageddon (2007), reached the top 30 on the German and Swedish Sverigetopplistan charts. The following year, they released the second part The Crucible of Man, which reached the top 40 on the Austrian, Finnish, German, and Swiss charts.

On March 3, 2011, Iced Earth vocalist Matt Barlow issued a statement on the band's official website, stating that he was retiring from the band (for a second time) in order to spend more time with his family. Shortly after announcing Barlow's departure from the band, Iced Earth announced that Into Eternity frontman Stu Block had been chosen as the band's new lead vocalist. The following album, Dystopia, had commercial and critical success with many praising Stu Block as the new vocalist. The band's latest album, Incorruptible, was released on June 16, 2017.

== Albums ==
=== Studio albums ===
Year	Album details	Peak chart positions											Sales
Year	Album details	US	AUT	BEL	CAN	FIN	FRA	GER	JPN	NLD	SWE	SWI	Sales
1990	Iced Earth: Released: November 1990; Label: Century Media; Format: CD, cassette, LP	—	—	—	—	—	—	—	—	—	—	—	
1991	Night of the Stormrider: Released: November 11, 1991; Label: Century Media; Format: CD, cassette, LP	—	—	—	—	—	—	—	60	—	—	—	
1995	Burnt Offerings: Released: April 18, 1995; Label: Century Media; Format: CD, cassette, LP	—	—	—	—	—	—	—	—	—	—	—	
1996	The Dark Saga: Released: July 23, 1996; Label: Century Media; Format: CD, cassette, LP	—	—	—	—	—	—	—	—	—	—	—	US: 21,011+
1998	Something Wicked This Way Comes: Released: July 7, 1998; Label: Century Media; Format: CD, cassette, LP	—	50	—	—	—	—	19	—	—	—	—	US: 41,590+
2001	Horror Show: Released: June 26, 2001; Label: Century Media; Format: CD, LP	—	32	—	—	—	90	28	—	—	—	86	US: 31,967+
2004	The Glorious Burden: Released: January 13, 2004; Label: Steamhammer; Format: CD, LP	145	24	69	—	30	80	15	199	87	39	77	US: 70,000+
2007	Framing Armageddon: Something Wicked Part 1: Released: September 11, 2007; Label: Steamhammer; Format: CD, LP	79	36	84	—	—	77	19	162	60	28	56	
2008	The Crucible of Man: Something Wicked Part 2: Released: September 9, 2008; Label: Steamhammer; Format: CD, LP	79	34	72	—	35	86	28	—	63	46	39	
2011	Dystopia: Released: October 18, 2011; Label: Century Media; Format: CD, LP	67	51	61	—	34	107	23	—	85	29	53	
2014	Plagues of Babylon: Released: January 21, 2014; Label: Century Media; Format: CD, LP	49	27	34	—	—	126	5	—	85	—	23	
2017	Incorruptible: Released: June 16, 2017; Label: Century Media; Format: CD, LP	42	18	29	64	47	104	15	—	—	—	17	
"—" denotes releases that did not chart or were not released in that country.

=== Covers albums ===
Year	Album details	Peak chart positions											Sales
Year	Album details	US	AUT	BEL	CAN	FIN	FRA	GER	JPN	NLD	SWE	SWI	Sales
2002	Tribute to the Gods: Released: November 12, 2002; Label: Century Media; Format: CD, LP	—	32	—	—	—	90	28	—	—	—	—	
"—" denotes releases that did not chart or were not released in that country.

=== Live albums ===
Year	Album details
1999	Alive in Athens: Released: July 19, 1999; Label: Century Media; Format: CD, LP, DVD; Platinum – Greece
2013	Live in Ancient Kourion: Released: April 15, 2013; Label: Century Media; Format: CD, LP, DVD
2022	Bang Your Head: Released: May 27, 2022; Label: Ravencraft Productions; Format: CD

=== Compilation albums ===
Year	Album details
1997	Days of Purgatory: Released: June 6, 1997; Label: Century Media; Format: CD
2004	The Blessed and the Damned: Released: July 26, 2004; Label: Century Media; Format: CD
2008	Enter the Realm of the Gods: Released: March 31, 2008; Label: Century Media; Format: CD
2022	A Narrative Soundscape: Released: January 21, 2022; Label: Ravencraft Productions; Format: CD

== Extended plays ==
Year	EP details
1989	Enter the Realm: Released: April 12, 1989; Label: Self Released; Format: Cassette, Vinyl
1999	The Melancholy E.P.: Released: April 19, 1999; Label: Century Media; Format: CD
2007	Overture of the Wicked: Released: June 4, 2007; Label: SPV; Format: CD
2011	5 Songs: Released: September 19, 2011; Label: Century Media; Format: CD

== Singles ==
Year	Song	Peak chart positions				Album
Year	Song	US Sales	FIN	FRA	GER	Album
2001	"Frankenstein"	—	—	—	—	Horror Show
2003	"The Reckoning"	—	—	—	42	The Glorious Burden
2007	"Setian Massacre"/"Ten Thousand Strong"	—	—	—	—	Framing Armageddon
2008	"I Walk Among You"	—	—	74	—	The Crucible of Man
2011	"Dante's Inferno 2011"	—	—	—	—	

== Box sets ==
Year	Box details
2001	Dark Genesis: Released: November 26, 2001; Label: Century Media; Format: CD
2008	Slave to the Dark: Released: February 22, 2008; Label: Century Media; Format: CD/DVD
2010	Box of the Wicked: Released: April 26, 2010; Label: SPV/Steamhammer; Format: CD

== Videos ==
Year	Video details
2005	Gettysburg (1863): Released: June 6, 2005; Label: Steamhammer; Format: DVD
2006	Alive in Athens: Released: October 30, 2006; Label: Century Media; Format: DVD
2011	Festivals of the Wicked: Released: June 27, 2011; Label: Century Media; Format: DVD
2013	Live in Ancient Kourion: Released: April 15, 2013; Label: Century Media; Format: DVD

== Music videos ==
Year	Title	Director
1990/91	"Colors"	Unknown
1990/91	"Life and Death"	Jon Ericson
1991/92	"Desert Rain"	Unknown
1999	"Melancholy (Holy Martyr)"	Unknown
2003	"When the Eagle Cries"	Brian Smith
2004	"The Reckoning"	Brian Smith
2005	"Declaration Day"	Machine
2007	"Ten Thousand Strong"	Roger Johannsen
2011	"Dystopia"	Unknown
2011	"Anthem"	Kosch Fabian
2017	"Black Flag"	Ivan Colic
