= The Blessed and the Damned =

Greatest hits album by Iced Earth
- Released: July 26, 2004
- Recorded: 1990–2001
- Genre: Power metal; heavy metal; thrash metal
- Length: 2:04:48
- Label: Century Media

Iced Earth chronology
The Glorious Burden (2004)	The Blessed and the Damned (2004)	Overture of the Wicked (2007)

Alternate album cover
- "The Damned" cover version of the album

Professional ratings
Review scores
Source	Rating
AllMusic	link

The Blessed and the Damned is a double CD best of compilation album by American heavy metal band Iced Earth. The CD-booklet can be reversed, to show either angels or demons on the cover. The booklet also includes Jon Schaffer's comments on previous albums and his life. Even though the CD was released after The Glorious Burden, the biography in the booklet makes no mention of it. This is probably because Iced Earth left their record label Century Media Records prior to The Glorious Burden, and signed with SPV. In turn, Century Media released this compilation album.

== Track listing ==
=== Disc one ===
No.	Title	Lyrics	Music	Original album	Length
1.	"Burning Times"	Matt Barlow; Jon Schaffer	Barlow; Schaffer	Something Wicked This Way Comes	3:43
2.	"Wolf"	Schaffer	Schaffer	Horror Show	5:20
3.	"The Hunter"	Schaffer	Schaffer	The Dark Saga	3:55
4.	"Curse the Sky"	Schaffer	Randall Shawver; Schaffer	Iced Earth	4:43
5.	"Melancholy (Holy Martyr)"	Schaffer	Schaffer	Something Wicked This Way Comes	4:44
6.	"Stormrider"	Schaffer	Shawver; Schaffer	Night of the Stormrider	4:48
7.	"Burnt Offerings"	Schaffer	Shawver; Schaffer	Burnt Offerings	7:21
8.	"Travel in Stygian" (live)	Schaffer	Schaffer	Alive in Athens	9:06
9.	"Dark Saga"	Schaffer	Schaffer	The Dark Saga	3:43
10.	"Written on the Walls"	Gene Adam	Adam; Shawver; Schaffer; Dave Abell	Iced Earth	6:07
11.	"Damien"	Schaffer	Schaffer	Horror Show	9:11

=== Disc two ===
No.	Title	Lyrics	Music	Original album	Length
1.	"Angels Holocaust"	Schaffer	Schaffer	Days of Purgatory	4:54
2.	"Desert Rain"	Schaffer	Schaffer; Abell	Days of Purgatory	6:38
3.	"Last December"	Schaffer	Schaffer	Burnt Offerings	3:23
4.	"Watching Over Me"	Schaffer	Schaffer	Something Wicked This Way Comes	4:26
5.	"Pure Evil" (live)	Schaffer	Shawver; Schaffer	Alive in Athens	6:37
6.	"The Path I Choose"	Schaffer	Shawver; Schaffer	Night of the Stormrider	5:55
7.	"I Died for You"	Schaffer	Schaffer	The Dark Saga	3:47
8.	"Disciples of the Lie"	Schaffer	Schaffer	Something Wicked This Way Comes	4:04
9.	"When the Night Falls"	Schaffer	Schaffer	Days of Purgatory	7:50
10.	"Jack"	Barlow	Schaffer	Horror Show	4:12
11.	"Iced Earth"	Schaffer	Schaffer	Iced Earth	5:23
12.	"Violate" (live)	Schaffer	Schaffer	Alive in Athens	4:12

== Personnel ==
- Jon Schaffer − rhythm guitar, backing vocals on all songs. vocals on track 6 on disc one
- Matt Barlow − vocals on tracks 1–3, 5, 7–9, and 11 on disc one; tracks 1–5, 7–10, and 12 on disc two
- Gene Adam − vocals on tracks 4 and 10 on disc one; track 11 on disc two
- John Greely − vocals on track 6 on disc two
- Randall Shawver − lead guitar on tracks 3–4, 6–7, and 9–10 on disc one; tracks 1–3, 6–7, 9, and 11 on disc two
- Larry Tarnowski − lead guitar on tracks 1–2, 5, 8, and 11 on disc one; tracks 4–5, 8, 10, and 12 on disc two
- Dave Abell − bass on tracks 3–4, 6–7, and 9–10 on disc one; tracks 3, 6–7, and 11 on disc two
- James MacDonough − bass on tracks 1, 5, and 8 on disc one; tracks 1, 2, 4–5, 8, 9 and 12 on disc two
- Steve Di Giorgio − bass on tracks 2 and 11 on disc one, and track 10 on disc two
- Mark Prator − drums on tracks 3 and 9 on disc one; track 7 on disc two
- Richey Secchiari − drums on track 6 on disc one; track 6 on disc two
- Mike McGill − drums on tracks 4 and 10 on disc one; track 11 on disc two
- Richard Christy − drums on tracks 2 and 11 on disc one; track 10 on disc two
- Brent Smedley − drums on tracks 1, 5, and 8 on disc one; tracks 1, 2, 4, 5, 8, 9, and 12 on disc two
- Rodney Beasley − drums on track 7 on disc one; track 3 on disc two
- Leo Hao – cover art
