= Dark Genesis =

Box set by Iced Earth
- Released: November 27, 2001
- Recorded: Jan 1988–Aug 2001
- Genre: Power metal; heavy metal; thrash metal
- Length: 3:36:13
- Label: Century Media
- Producer: Iced Earth

Iced Earth chronology
| Horror Show (2001) | Dark Genesis (2001) | Tribute to the Gods (2002) |

Professional ratings
Review scores
| Source | Rating |
|---|---|
| AllMusic | 4/5 stars |

Dark Genesis is a five-disc box set by American heavy metal band Iced Earth, released on November 27, 2001. It contains remastered & remixed versions of their first three studio albums (Iced Earth, Night of the Stormrider and Burnt Offerings), their rare demo Enter the Realm, and a newly recorded tribute CD, Tribute to the Gods, which contains covers of many songs that have influenced Iced Earth. The Tribute to the Gods CD was the last Iced Earth release to feature lead guitarist Larry Tarnowski, and the last to feature Matt Barlow until his 2007 return. As well, that same disc marked bassist James MacDonough's first Iced Earth disc since 1999, as he had been absent during the recording of Horror Show.

== Misprinting error ==
Once the Dark Genesis box set was released, reports started coming in of misprintings on the discs. Disc one (Enter the Realm) would play disc three (Night of the Stormrider), disc two (Iced Earth) would play disc four (Burnt Offerings), disc three would play disc one and disc four would play disc two. Disc five (Tribute to the Gods) remained true to its printing. This fault got back to Iced Earth, who quickly released a statement on their official website about how disappointed and embarrassed they were about the errors and gave everyone their humble apologies, despite not being their fault at all. It was announced that through investigations, 3,000 of the 4,000 shipped units were affected with this error. The statement also insisted fans to send back their error discs along with their names and addresses to Century Media's head office and they'll be replaced with new discs with the correct printings on them.

== Track listing ==
=== Disc one ===
Enter the Realm remastered, 1989

| No. | Title | Lyrics | Music | Length |
|---|---|---|---|---|
| 1. | "Enter the Realm" | (instrumental) | Jon Schaffer | 0:54 |
| 2. | "Colors" | Schaffer | Randall Shawver; Shaffer | 5:04 |
| 3. | "Nightmares" | Schaffer | Schaffer | 3:32 |
| 4. | "Curse the Sky" | Schaffer | Shawver; Schaffer | 4:44 |
| 5. | "Solitude" | (instrumental) | Shawver; Schaffer | 1:44 |
| 6. | "Iced Earth" | Schaffer | Schaffer | 5:32 |

=== Disc two ===
Iced Earth remastered & remixed 2001, originally 1990

| No. | Title | Lyrics | Music | Length |
|---|---|---|---|---|
| 1. | "Iced Earth" | Schaffer | Schaffer | 5:23 |
| 2. | "Written on the Walls" | Gene Adam | Adam; Shawver; Schaffer; Dave Abell | 6:07 |
| 3. | "Colors" | Schaffer | Shawver; Schaffer | 4:51 |
| 4. | "Curse the Sky" | Schaffer | Shawver; Schaffer | 4:44 |
| 5. | "Life and Death" | Schaffer | Shawver; Schaffer | 6:08 |
| 6. | "Solitude" | (instrumental) | Shawver; Schaffer | 1:44 |
| 7. | "The Funeral" | (instrumental) | Shawver; Schaffer | 6:16 |
| 8. | "When the Night Falls" | Schaffer | Schaffer | 9:01 |

=== Disc three ===
Night of the Stormrider remastered & remixed 2001, originally 1991

| No. | Title | Lyrics | Music | Length |
|---|---|---|---|---|
| 1. | "Angels Holocaust" | Schaffer | Schaffer | 4:52 |
| 2. | "Stormrider" | Schaffer | Shawver; Schaffer | 4:48 |
| 3. | "The Path I Choose" | Schaffer | Shawver; Schaffer | 5:53 |
| 4. | "Before the Vision" | Schaffer | Shawver; Abell | 1:36 |
| 5. | "Mystical End" | Schaffer | Schaffer | 4:43 |
| 6. | "Desert Rain" | Schaffer | Schaffer; Abell | 6:56 |
| 7. | "Pure Evil" | Schaffer | Shawver; Schaffer | 6:33 |
| 8. | "Reaching the End" | Schaffer | Schaffer | 1:11 |
| 9. | "Travel in Stygian" | Schaffer | Schaffer | 9:31 |

=== Disc four ===
Burnt Offerings remastered & remixed 2001, originally 1995

| No. | Title | Lyrics | Music | Length |
|---|---|---|---|---|
| 1. | "Burnt Offerings" | Schaffer | Shawver; Schaffer | 7:22 |
| 2. | "Last December" | Schaffer | Schaffer | 3:23 |
| 3. | "Diary" | Matt Barlow | Shawver; Schaffer; Abell | 6:14 |
| 4. | "Brainwashed" | Schaffer | Shawver; Schaffer | 5:22 |
| 5. | "Burning Oasis" | Schaffer | Shawver; Schaffer; Abell | 6:00 |
| 6. | "Creator Failure" | Schaffer | Shawver; Schaffer; Abell | 6:02 |
| 7. | "The Pierced Spirit" | Schaffer | Shawver; Abell | 1:54 |
| 8. | "Dante's Inferno" | Schaffer | Schaffer | 16:26 |

=== Disc five ===
Tribute to the Gods, 2001

| No. | Title | Writer(s) | Original artist | Length |
|---|---|---|---|---|
| 1. | "Creatures of the Night" | Paul Stanley; Adam Mitchell | Kiss | 4:01 |
| 2. | "The Number of the Beast" | Steve Harris | Iron Maiden | 4:33 |
| 3. | "Highway to Hell" | Bon Scott; Angus Young; Malcolm Young | AC/DC | 3:23 |
| 4. | "Burnin' for You" | Donald Roeser; Richard Meltzer | Blue Öyster Cult | 4:26 |
| 5. | "God of Thunder" | Stanley | Kiss | 3:56 |
| 6. | "Screaming for Vengeance" | Rob Halford; K.K. Downing; Glenn Tipton | Judas Priest | 4:37 |
| 7. | "Dead Babies" | Alice Cooper; Glen Buxton; Michael Bruce; Dennis Dunaway; Neal Smith | Alice Cooper | 5:40 |
| 8. | "Cities on Flame with Rock and Roll" | Roeser; Albert Bouchard; Sandy Pearlman | Blue Öyster Cult | 3:59 |
| 9. | "It's a Long Way to the Top (If You Wanna Rock 'n' Roll)" | Scott; Young; Young | AC/DC | 4:42 |
| 10. | "Black Sabbath" | Ozzy Osbourne; Tony Iommi; Geezer Butler; Bill Ward | Black Sabbath | 5:30 |
| 11. | "Hallowed Be Thy Name" | Harris | Iron Maiden | 7:08 |

== Personnel ==
- Jon Schaffer − rhythm guitar on all tracks, lead vocals on "Stormrider" and "God of Thunder"
- Gene Adam − vocals on discs one and two
- Matt Barlow − vocals on discs four and five
- John Greely − vocals on disc three
- Randall Shawver − lead guitar on discs 1–4
- Larry Tarnowski − lead guitar on disc five
- Dave Abell − bass guitar on discs 1–4
- James MacDonough − bass guitar on disc five
- Greg Seymour − drums on disc one
- Mike McGill − drums on disc two
- Rick Secchiari − drums on disc three
- Rodney Beasley − drums on disc four
- Richard Christy − drums on disc five
