= Days of Purgatory =

Compilation album by Iced Earth
- Released: June 6, 1997
- Recorded: Morrisound Studios
- Genres: Thrash metal; power metal
- Length: 80:27 (1CD edition); 122:47 (2CD edition)
- Label: Century Media
- Producer: Jim Morris

Iced Earth chronology
The Dark Saga (1996)	Days of Purgatory (1997)	Something Wicked This Way Comes (1998)

Professional ratings
Review scores
Source	Rating
AllMusic	4.5/5 stars

Days of Purgatory is an album by American heavy metal band Iced Earth, released on June 6, 1997. It is a collection of remixes and remakes from previous albums, with the exception of their then-recent record The Dark Saga. Most of the songs from the Enter the Realm EP, Iced Earth, and Night of the Stormrider were re-sung by Matt Barlow, and on some of the songs the drums and bass were redone. The 2-CD version also has rough mixes of several songs from Burnt Offerings with the opening to the title track re-recorded. The album cover features artwork of the Chaos Comics character Purgatori.

The reason for the album was to improve the original songs, create nostalgia for older fans and introduce newer fans to Iced Earth's older work. The 2-CD limited edition was originally produced for European audiences but has since been released in the United States. Days of Purgatory was the last new release from the band featuring longtime guitarist Randall Shawver, and the first to feature bassist James MacDonough and drummer Brent Smedley.

The song "Written on the Walls" from the band's self-titled album was given completely new lyrics and renamed "Cast in Stone". The only songs left unrecorded from the band's first albums were "Mystical End", "The Path I Choose", and "Curse the Sky", though the latter two were both performed live with Barlow on vocals. "Winter Nights" was recorded during early sessions for Night of the Stormrider while Gene Adam was still on vocals, but this was the track which prompted Schaffer to ask Adam to get singing lessons, as it was felt he could not handle the high notes. Therefore, the song was not used on the album due to its acrimonious history, though it would have fit in with the storyline of the album. Live performances of this song from that era (such as Wuppertal '91) show him struggling to sing it, probably contributing to his dismissal. Schaffer eventually dug the song out of the vaults to use on this album with Barlow providing vocals, but, as mentioned in the album's booklet, used a 1986 Purgatory demo for the backing track instead.

== Track listing ==
=== One-CD edition ===
No.	Title	Lyrics	Music	Original album	Length
1.	"Enter the Realm"	(instrumental)	Jon Schaffer	Enter the Realm	0:54
2.	"Colors"	Schaffer	Randall Shawver; Schaffer	Iced Earth	4:50
3.	"Angels Holocaust"	Schaffer	Schaffer	Night of the Stormrider	4:53
4.	"Stormrider"	Schaffer	Shawver; Schaffer	Night of the Stormrider	4:47
5.	"Winter Nights"	Schaffer	Schaffer	(previously unreleased)	3:55
6.	"Nightmares"	Schaffer	Schaffer	Enter the Realm	3:42
7.	"Pure Evil"	Schaffer	Shawver; Schaffer	Night of the Stormrider	6:33
8.	"Solitude"	(instrumental)	Shawver; Schaffer	Iced Earth	1:44
9.	"When the Night Falls"	Schaffer	Schaffer	Iced Earth	9:01
10.	"Desert Rain"	Schaffer	Schaffer; Dave Abell	Night of the Stormrider	6:56
11.	"The Funeral"	(instrumental)	Shawver; Schaffer	Iced Earth	6:15
12.	"Cast in Stone" (rewritten version of "Written on the Walls")	Matt Barlow	Shawver; Schaffer; Abell	Iced Earth	5:59
13.	"Reaching the End"	Schaffer	Schaffer	Night of the Stormrider	1:11
14.	"Travel in Stygian"	Schaffer	Schaffer	Night of the Stormrider	9:32
15.	"Iced Earth"	Schaffer	Schaffer	Iced Earth	5:22

=== Two-CD edition ===
==== Disc one ====
No.	Title	Lyrics	Music	Original album	Length
1.	"Enter the Realm"		Schaffer	Enter the Realm	0:54
2.	"Colors"	Schaffer	Shawver; Schaffer	Iced Earth	4:50
3.	"Angels Holocaust"	Schaffer	Schaffer	Night of the Stormrider	4:53
4.	"Stormrider"	Schaffer	Shawver; Schaffer	Night of the Stormrider	4:47
5.	"Winter Nights"	Schaffer	Schaffer	(previously unreleased)	3:55
6.	"Nightmares"	Schaffer	Schaffer	Enter the Realm	3:42
7.	"Before the Vision"	Schaffer	Shawver; Abell	Night of the Stormrider	1:35
8.	"Pure Evil"	Schaffer	Shawver; Schaffer	Night of the Stormrider	6:33
9.	"Solitude"	(instrumental)	Shawver; Schaffer	Iced Earth	1:44
10.	"The Funeral"	(instrumental)	Shawver; Schaffer	Iced Earth	6:15
11.	"When the Night Falls"	Schaffer	Schaffer	Iced Earth	9:01

==== Disc two ====
No.	Title	Lyrics	Music	Original album	Length
1.	"Burnt Offerings"	Schaffer	Shawver; Schaffer	Burnt Offerings	7:22
2.	"Cast in Stone" (rewritten version of "Written on the Walls")	Barlow	Shawver; Schaffer; Abell	Iced Earth	5:59
3.	"Desert Rain"	Schaffer	Schaffer; Abell	Night of the Stormrider	6:56
4.	"Brainwashed"	Schaffer	Shawver; Schaffer	Burnt Offerings	5:22
5.	"Life and Death"	Schaffer	Shawver; Schaffer	Iced Earth	6:07
6.	"Creator Failure"	Schaffer	Shawver; Schaffer; Abell	Burnt Offerings	6:02
7.	"Reaching the End"	Schaffer	Schaffer	Night of the Stormrider	1:11
8.	"Travel in Stygian"	Schaffer	Schaffer	Night of the Stormrider	9:32
9.	"Dante's Inferno"	Schaffer	Schaffer	Burnt Offerings	16:26
10.	"Iced Earth"	Schaffer	Schaffer	Iced Earth	5:22

== Personnel ==
- Jon Schaffer – rhythm guitar, vocals
- Randall Shawver – lead guitar
- Matt Barlow – lead vocals
- Brent Smedley – drums on tracks 1, 2, 5, 6, 9, 21
- James MacDonough – bass on 1, 2, 5, 6, 9, 21
- Dave Abell – bass on 3, 4, 7, 8, 10–20
- Mike McGill – drums on 10, 11, 13, 16
- Richey Secchiari – drums on 3, 4, 7, 8, 14, 18, 19
- Rodney Beasley – drums on 12, 15, 17, 20

Additional personnel

- Howard Helm – keyboards
- Kent Smith – keyboards
