= List of Iced Earth band members =

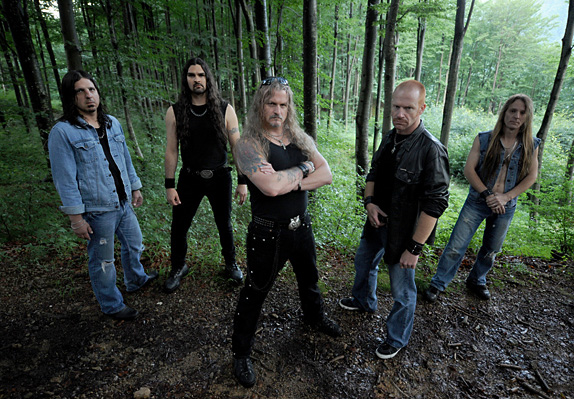
Iced Earth in 2008

Iced Earth is an American heavy metal band from Tampa, Florida. Formed in 1985 under the name Purgatory, the group originally consisted of vocalist Gene Adam, lead guitarist Bill Owen, rhythm guitarist Jon Schaffer, bassist Richard Bateman and drummer Greg Seymour. The band has been inactive since February 2021, when vocalist Stu Block, lead guitarist Jake Dreyer, bassist Luke Appleton and drummer Brent Smedley all left in response to band leader Schaffer's involvement in the January 6 United States Capitol attack.

== History ==
=== 1985–1998 ===
Jon Schaffer and Greg Seymour officially formed Iced Earth (originally known as Purgatory) on January 20, 1985. The first full lineup was completed shortly thereafter with the addition of Gene Adam, Bill Owen and Richard Bateman. The original incarnation released two demos in 1985 – Burning Oasis and Psychotic Dreams – before Bateman was replaced by Dave Abell in time for the recording of a third, Horror Show. In 1987, Owen made way for new lead guitarist Randall Shawver. The following year, Purgatory changed its name to Iced Earth. The first demo under the new moniker, Enter the Realm, was released in 1989. Seymour left shortly after its release due to tensions with Schaffer, and was replaced by Mike McGill. The band signed with Century Media Records and issued its self-titled full-length debut the following year.

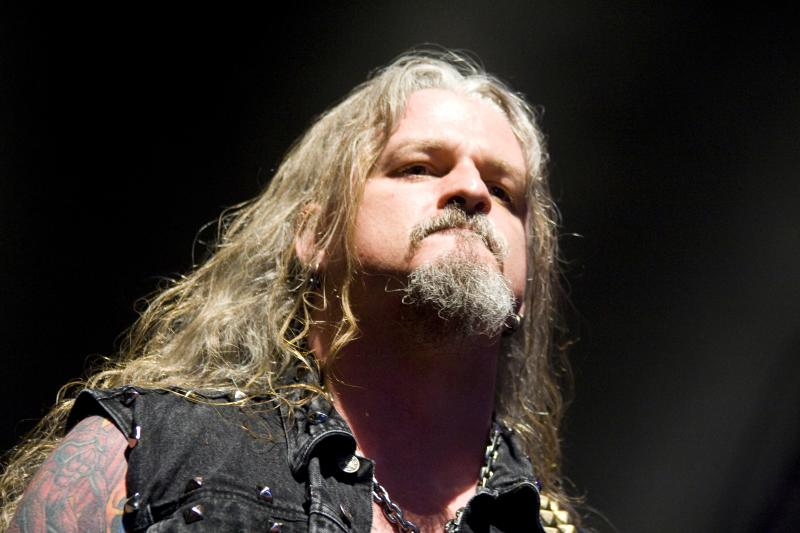
By 1997, guitarist Jon Schaffer was the only original member of Iced Earth still a member of the band.

After touring in promotion of Iced Earth, the band saw further personnel changes in the spring of 1991 when Adam and McGill were replaced by John Greely and Rick Secchiari, respectively, for the production of Night of the Stormrider. After the album was released, Rodney Beasley took over on drums for subsequent live shows. The album was promoted on a short touring cycle running until the fall of 1992, when the group went on a hiatus for two years. In 1995 they returned with Burnt Offerings, which marked the debut of Beasley and new vocalist Matt Barlow. Mark "The Creeper" Prator took over from Beasley on a session basis for the recording of The Dark Saga.

Before The Dark Saga was released, long-term bassist Abell was replaced by Keith Menser. The new bassist featured in photography for the album, but was replaced shortly after its release by James MacDonough, who brought with him bandmate Brent Smedley as Iced Earth's new drummer. The new lineup released Days of Purgatory, a collection of reworked older tracks, in 1997. Just before the recording of Something Wicked This Way Comes in early 1998, Schaffer decided to relocate the band back to his home state of Indiana, which prompted lead guitarist Shawver to leave. The album featured Prator on drums, as Smedley was unavailable due to "personal reasons".

=== 1998–2008 ===
With new lead guitarist Larry Tarnowski in place of Shawver, Iced Earth toured throughout 1998 and early 1999, releasing their first live album Alive in Athens from the cycle. In the summer of 2000, Smedley was replaced by Richard Christy. For the recording of Horror Show, MacDonough was also replaced by Steve Di Giorgio, although by the time it was released in May 2001 the former had already returned after Di Giorgio reportedly pulled out of touring due to "prior commitments". Covers album Tribute to the Gods followed in 2002, before Tarnowski left in March 2003 to focus on his studies. He was replaced in June by Ralph Santolla, shortly after Barlow also announced his departure from the group. Tim "Ripper" Owens took over on vocals, following his departure from Judas Priest in July.

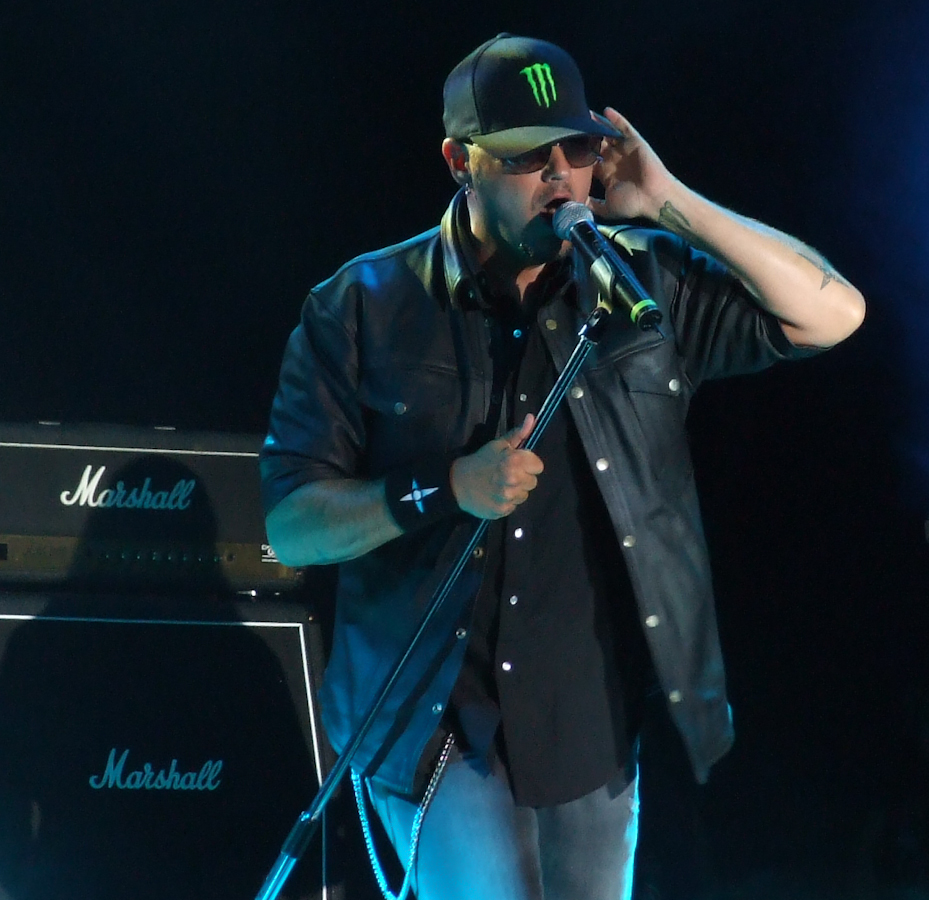
After his departure from Judas Priest in 2003, Tim "Ripper" Owens took over as Iced Earth vocalist.

Following the release of Owens' and Santolla's Iced Earth debut The Glorious Burden, Christy left the band in May 2004 to work on The Howard Stern Show, with Bobby Jarzombek taking his place. In July, Santolla also left to join Sebastian Bach's solo band. The guitarist was not immediately replaced, and by September MacDonough had also left to join Megadeth. Iced Earth remained inactive for almost two years after the lineup changes, before it was announced at the end of June 2006 that the group had added Ernie Carletti as its new lead guitarist. By October, Carletti had been replaced by Tim Mills as the former was facing charges of rape, kidnapping and weapons possession, while former drummer Brent Smedley had returned in place of Jarzombek. On the last day of the year, Schaffer announced that James "Bo" Wallace was the band's new bassist.

Iced Earth recorded Overture of the Wicked in February 2007, with Schaffer performing bass after Wallace's departure due to "family health issues". The next month, Mills left the band to focus on his business Bare Knuckle Pickups. He was replaced in May by Troy Seele, who had performed some lead guitars on the recently completed album Framing Armageddon: Something Wicked Part 1. After a European tour to promote the album, it was announced in December 2007 that Owens was to be replaced by the returning Matt Barlow. At the same time, Owens' former Winter's Bane bandmate Hayes was also dismissed. He was replaced in March 2008 by Freddie Vidales.

=== Since 2008 ===
After the release of 2008's The Crucible of Man: Something Wicked Part 2, Iced Earth continued touring intermittently for several years, before Matt Barlow announced his second departure from the band in March 2011. His replacement was announced as Into Eternity's Stu Block, who took over after a final run of shows with Barlow ending in August. The new vocalist debuted on a re-recorded version of "Dante's Inferno" and new album Dystopia, which were the last contributions of Vidales who was replaced by Luke Appleton in April 2012. In May 2013, Brent Smedley left for a second time to return home and take care of his family, with Raphael Saini taking his place.

Saini recorded the 2014 album Plagues of Babylon and performed a run of shows, before he was replaced by former Testament and Slayer drummer Jon Dette in November 2013. Dette continued touring with Iced Earth until April 2015, when Smedley was able to return to the band. During writing for a new album, Troy Seele left the group in August 2016 in order to focus on his family responsibilities. He was replaced the next month by Jake Dreyer, current band Witherfall with Joseph Michael (Sanctuary). Dreyer debuted on Incorruptible, which was released the following year. Iced Earth's lineup remained constant until January 2021, when band leader Jon Schaffer was put in federal custody after his involvement in the 2021 United States Capitol attack. The next month, Block, Dreyer and Appleton announced their departures from the band. By 2024, Smedley had also left the band.

== Members ==
=== Current ===
| Image | Name | Years active | Instruments | Release contributions |
|---|---|---|---|---|
| | Jon Schaffer | 1985–present | rhythm guitar; backing and lead vocals; keyboards; mandolin; studio bass (2007–2008) | all Iced Earth releases |

=== Former ===
| Image | Name | Years active | Instruments | Release contributions |
|---|---|---|---|---|
| | Gene Adam | 1985–1991 | lead vocals | all Iced Earth releases from Burning Oasis (1985) to Iced Earth (1990) |
| | Greg Seymour | 1985–1989 | drums | Burning Oasis (1985); Psychotic Dreams (1985); Horror Show (1986); Enter the Realm (1989) |
| | Bill Owen | 1985–1987 | lead guitar | Burning Oasis (1985); Psychotic Dreams (1985); Horror Show (1986) |
| | Richard Bateman | 1985–1986 (died 2018) | bass | Burning Oasis (1985); Psychotic Dreams (1985) |
| | Dave Abell | 1986–1996 | bass | all Iced Earth releases from Horror Show (1986) to The Dark Saga (1996) |
| | Randall Shawver | 1987–1998 | lead guitar | all Iced Earth releases from Enter the Realm (1989) to Days of Purgatory (1997) |
| | Mike McGill | 1989–1991 | drums | Iced Earth (1990) |
| | John Greely | 1991–1993 | lead vocals | Night of the Stormrider (1991) |
| | Rick Secchiari | 1991 | drums | Night of the Stormrider (1991) |
| | Rodney Beasley | 1992–1995 | drums | Burnt Offerings (1995) |
| | Matt Barlow | 1993–2003; 2007–2011 | lead vocals | all Iced Earth releases from Burnt Offerings (1995) to The Glorious Burden (2004); The Crucible of Man: Something Wicked Part 2 (2008); Festivals of the Wicked (2011) – two shows |
| | Mark Prator | 1996; 1998 (both session) | drums; backing vocals | The Dark Saga (1996); Something Wicked This Way Comes (1998); The Glorious Burden (2004) |
| | Keith Menser | 1996 | bass | none |
| | Brent Smedley | 1996–2000; 2006–2013; 2015–2021 | drums; percussion | Days of Purgatory (1997); Alive in Athens (1999); all Iced Earth releases from Overture of the Wicked (2007) to Live in Ancient Kourion (2013); Incorruptible (2017) |
| | James MacDonough | 1996–2000; 2001–2004 | bass | all Iced Earth releases from Days of Purgatory (1997) to The Glorious Burden (2004), except Horror Show (2001) |
| | Larry Tarnowski | 1998–2003 | lead guitar; backing and occasional lead vocals | Something Wicked This Way Comes (1998); Alive in Athens (1999); Horror Show (2001); Tribute to the Gods (2002) |
| | Richard Christy | 2000–2004 | drums | Horror Show (2001); Tribute to the Gods (2002); The Glorious Burden (2004) |
| | Steve Di Giorgio | 2000–2001 | bass | Horror Show (2001) |
| | Ralph Santolla | 2003–2004 (died 2018) | lead guitar | The Glorious Burden (2004) – four tracks only |
| | Tim "Ripper" Owens | 2003–2007 | lead vocals | The Glorious Burden (2004); Overture of the Wicked (2007); Framing Armageddon: Something Wicked Part 1 (2007); Festivals of the Wicked (2011) – one show |
| | Bobby Jarzombek | 2004–2006 | drums | none |
| | Ernie Carletti | 2006 | lead guitar | none |
| | Tim Mills | 2006–2007 | lead guitar | Overture of the Wicked (2007); Framing Armageddon: Something Wicked Part 1 (2007) – one track only |
| | James "Bo" Wallace | 2006–2007 | bass | none |
| | Troy Seele | 2007–2016 | lead guitar; backing vocals | all Iced Earth releases from Framing Armageddon: Something Wicked Part 1 (2007) to Plagues of Babylon (2014) |
| | Freddie Vidales | 2008–2012 | bass; backing vocals | Festivals of the Wicked (2011); "Dante's Inferno 2011" (2011); Dystopia (2011) |
| | Stu Block | 2011–2021 | lead vocals | all Iced Earth releases from "Dante's Inferno 2011" (2011) to Incorruptible (2017) |
| | Luke Appleton | 2012–2021 | bass; backing vocals | Live in Ancient Kourion (2013); Plagues of Babylon (2014); Incorruptible (2017) |
| | Raphael Saini | 2013 | drums | Plagues of Babylon (2014) |
| | Jon Dette | 2013–2015 | drums | none |
| | Jake Dreyer | 2016–2021 | lead guitar | Incorruptible (2017) |

== Lineups ==
| Period | Members | Releases |
|---|---|---|
| Early 1985 – 1986 (as Purgatory) | Gene Adam – lead vocals; Bill Owen – lead guitar; Jon Schaffer – rhythm guitar, backing vocals; Richard Bateman – bass; Greg Seymour – drums | Burning Oasis (1985); Psychotic Dreams (1985) |
| 1986–1987 (as Purgatory) | Gene Adam – lead vocals; Bill Owen – lead guitar; Jon Schaffer – rhythm guitar, backing vocals; Dave Abell – bass; Greg Seymour – drums | Horror Show (1986) |
| 1987–1989 (as Purgatory until 1988) | Gene Adam – lead vocals; Randall Shawver – lead guitar; Jon Schaffer – rhythm guitar, backing vocals; Dave Abell – bass; Greg Seymour – drums | Enter the Realm (1989) |
| 1989–1991 | Gene Adam – lead vocals; Randall Shawver – lead guitar; Jon Schaffer – rhythm guitar, backing vocals; Dave Abell – bass; Mike McGill – drums | Iced Earth (1990) |
| Spring – late 1991 | John Greely – lead vocals; Randall Shawver – lead guitar; Jon Schaffer – rhythm guitar, vocals; Dave Abell – bass; Rick Secchiari – drums | Night of the Stormrider (1991) |
| Spring – fall 1992 | John Greely – lead vocals; Randall Shawver – lead guitar; Jon Schaffer – rhythm guitar, vocals; Dave Abell – bass; Rodney Beasley – drums | none |
Band on hiatus fall 1992 – late 1994
| Late 1994 – late 1995 | Matt Barlow – lead vocals; Randall Shawver – lead guitar; Jon Schaffer – rhythm guitar, vocals; Dave Abell – bass; Rodney Beasley – drums | Burnt Offerings (1995) |
| Late 1995 – early 1996 | Matt Barlow – lead vocals; Randall Shawver – lead guitar; Jon Schaffer – rhythm guitar, vocals; Dave Abell – bass; Mark Prator – drums, backing vocals (session) | The Dark Saga (1996) |
| Early – spring 1996 | Matt Barlow – lead vocals; Randall Shawver – lead guitar; Jon Schaffer – rhythm guitar, vocals; Keith Menser – bass | none |
| Spring 1996 – early 1998 | Matt Barlow – lead vocals; Randall Shawver – lead guitar; Jon Schaffer – rhythm guitar, vocals; James MacDonough – bass; Brent Smedley – drums | Days of Purgatory (1997) |
| March 1998 (temporary recording lineup) | Matt Barlow – lead vocals; Larry Tarnowski – lead guitar (session); Jon Schaffer – rhythm guitar, vocals; James MacDonough – bass; Mark Prator – drums (session) | Something Wicked This Way Comes (1998) |
| Spring 1998 – summer 2000 | Matt Barlow – lead vocals; Larry Tarnowski – lead guitar, backing vocals; Jon Schaffer – rhythm guitar, vocals; James MacDonough – bass; Brent Smedley – drums | Alive in Athens (1999) |
| Summer – late 2000 | Matt Barlow – lead vocals; Larry Tarnowski – lead guitar, backing vocals; Jon Schaffer – rhythm guitar, vocals; James MacDonough – bass; Richard Christy – drums | none |
| Late 2000 – spring 2001 | Matt Barlow – lead vocals; Larry Tarnowski – lead guitar, backing vocals; Jon Schaffer – rhythm guitar, vocals; Steve Di Giorgio – bass; Richard Christy – drums | Horror Show (2001) |
| Spring 2001 – March 2003 | Matt Barlow – lead vocals; Larry Tarnowski – lead guitar, backing vocals; Jon Schaffer – rhythm guitar, vocals; James MacDonough – bass; Richard Christy – drums | Tribute to the Gods (2001) |
| July 2003 – May 2004 | Tim "Ripper" Owens – lead vocals; Ralph Santolla – lead guitar; Jon Schaffer – rhythm guitar, vocals; James MacDonough – bass; Richard Christy – drums | The Glorious Burden (2004) |
| May – July 2004 | Tim "Ripper" Owens – lead vocals; Ralph Santolla – lead guitar; Jon Schaffer – rhythm guitar, vocals; James MacDonough – bass; Bobby Jarzombek – drums | none |
| July – September 2004 | Tim "Ripper" Owens – lead vocals; Jon Schaffer – guitar, vocals; James MacDonough – bass; Bobby Jarzombek – drums | none |
Band on hiatus September 2004 – June 2006
| June – October 2006 | Tim "Ripper" Owens – lead vocals; Ernie Carletti – lead guitar; Jon Schaffer – rhythm guitar, vocals; Bobby Jarzombek – drums | none |
| October – December 2006 | Tim "Ripper" Owens – lead vocals; Tim Mills – lead guitar; Jon Schaffer – rhythm guitar, vocals; Brent Smedley – drums | none |
| December 2006 – February 2007 | Tim "Ripper" Owens – lead vocals; Tim Mills – lead guitar; Jon Schaffer – rhythm guitar, vocals; James "Bo" Wallace – bass; Brent Smedley – drums | none |
| February – March 2007 | Tim "Ripper" Owens – lead vocals; Tim Mills – lead guitar; Jon Schaffer – guitar, bass, vocals; Brent Smedley – drums | Overture of the Wicked (2007) |
| March – May 2007 | Tim "Ripper" Owens – lead vocals; Jon Schaffer – guitar, vocals; Dennis Hayes – bass, backing vocals; Brent Smedley – drums | Framing Armageddon (2007) |
| May – December 2007 | Tim "Ripper" Owens – lead vocals; Troy Seele – lead guitar, backing vocals; Jon Schaffer – rhythm guitar, vocals; Dennis Hayes – bass, backing vocals; Brent Smedley – drums | Festivals of the Wicked (2011) – one show |
| December 2007 – March 2008 | Matt Barlow – lead vocals; Troy Seele – lead guitar, backing vocals; Jon Schaffer – guitar, bass, vocals; Brent Smedley – drums | The Crucible of Man (2008) |
| March 2008 – August 2011 | Matt Barlow – lead vocals; Troy Seele – lead guitar, backing vocals; Jon Schaffer – rhythm guitar, vocals; Freddie Vidales – bass, backing vocals; Brent Smedley – drums | Festivals of the Wicked (2011) – two shows |
| August 2011 – April 2012 | Stu Block – lead vocals; Troy Seele – lead guitar, backing vocals; Jon Schaffer – rhythm guitar, vocals; Freddie Vidales – bass, backing vocals; Brent Smedley – drums | "Dante's Inferno 2011" (2011); Dystopia (2011) |
| April 2012 – May 2013 | Stu Block – lead vocals; Troy Seele – lead guitar, backing vocals; Jon Schaffer – rhythm guitar, vocals; Luke Appleton – bass, backing vocals; Brent Smedley – drums | Live in Ancient Kourion (2013) |
| May – November 2013 | Stu Block – lead vocals; Troy Seele – lead guitar, backing vocals; Jon Schaffer – rhythm guitar, vocals; Luke Appleton – bass, backing vocals; Raphael Saini – drums | Plagues of Babylon (2014) |
| November 2013 – April 2015 | Stu Block – lead vocals; Troy Seele – lead guitar, backing vocals; Jon Schaffer – rhythm guitar, vocals; Luke Appleton – bass, backing vocals; Jon Dette – drums | none |
| April 2015 – August 2016 | Stu Block – lead vocals; Troy Seele – lead guitar, backing vocals; Jon Schaffer – rhythm guitar, vocals; Luke Appleton – bass, backing vocals; Brent Smedley – drums, percussion | none |
| September 2016 – February 2021 | Stu Block – lead vocals; Jake Dreyer – lead guitar; Jon Schaffer – rhythm guitar, vocals; Luke Appleton – bass, backing vocals; Brent Smedley – drums, percussion | Incorruptible (2017) |
Band inactive since February 2021
