= Tribute to the Gods =

Studio album of cover songs by Iced Earth
- Released: 2002
- Recorded: 2001
- Genre: Heavy metal
- Length: 51:55
- Label: Century Media

Iced Earth chronology
| Dark Genesis (2001) | Tribute to the Gods (2002) | The Glorious Burden (2004) |

Professional ratings
Review scores
| Source | Rating |
|---|---|
| AllMusic | 3/5 stars |

Tribute to the Gods is a covers album by heavy metal band Iced Earth. It is notable as the last Iced Earth album featuring Larry Tarnowski on lead guitar, and the last featuring singer Matt Barlow on vocals until his 2007 return. It was also their last album with Century Media until they returned to the label in 2010. This record was first released in 2001 in the box set Dark Genesis, but was re-released as a standalone disc in 2002. It was then re-released as part of the set Enter the Realm of the Gods along with the band's 1989 demo Enter the Realm in 2008 with new cover artwork.

== Track listing ==
| No. | Title | Writer(s) | Original artist | Length |
|---|---|---|---|---|
| 1. | "Creatures of the Night" | Paul Stanley; Adam Mitchell | Kiss | 4:01 |
| 2. | "The Number of the Beast" | Steve Harris | Iron Maiden | 4:33 |
| 3. | "Highway to Hell" | Bon Scott; Angus Young; Malcolm Young | AC/DC | 3:23 |
| 4. | "Burnin' for You" | Donald Roeser; Richard Meltzer | Blue Öyster Cult | 4:26 |
| 5. | "God of Thunder" | Stanley | Kiss | 3:56 |
| 6. | "Screaming for Vengeance" | Rob Halford; K.K. Downing; Glenn Tipton | Judas Priest | 4:37 |
| 7. | "Dead Babies" | Alice Cooper; Glen Buxton; Michael Bruce; Dennis Dunaway; Neal Smith | Alice Cooper | 5:40 |
| 8. | "Cities on Flame with Rock and Roll" | Roeser; Albert Bouchard; Sandy Pearlman | Blue Öyster Cult | 3:59 |
| 9. | "It's a Long Way to the Top (If You Wanna Rock 'n' Roll)" | Scott; A. Young; M. Young | AC/DC | 4:42 |
| 10. | "Black Sabbath" | Ozzy Osbourne; Tony Iommi; Geezer Butler; Bill Ward | Black Sabbath | 5:30 |
| 11. | "Hallowed Be Thy Name" | Steve Harris | Iron Maiden | 7:08 |
| Total length: | | | | 51:55 |

== Personnel ==
- Jon Schaffer − rhythm guitar, vocals on "God of Thunder"
- Matt Barlow − vocals
- Larry Tarnowski − lead guitar
- James MacDonough − bass guitar
- Richard Christy − drums

Additional personnel

- Jim Morris – guitar solo on "God of Thunder" and "Dead Babies" and backing vocals
