= Overture of the Wicked =

EP by Iced Earth
- Released: June 4, 2007
- Recorded: March 2007
- Studios: Soaring Eagle Sound, Nashville, Indiana
- Genres: Power metal; heavy metal; thrash metal
- Length: 22:25
- Label: SPV
- Producers: Jim Morris; Jon Schaffer

Iced Earth chronology
The Blessed and the Damned (2004)	Overture of the Wicked (2007)	Framing Armageddon: Something Wicked Part 1 (2007)

Professional ratings
Review scores
Source	Rating
AllMusic	3.5/5 stars
Jukebox:Metal	5/5 stars

Overture of the Wicked is an EP by American heavy metal band Iced Earth, released in June 2007. The EP features the band's new single "Ten Thousand Strong" which was recorded for the new album released later that same year Framing Armageddon, as well as a rerecording of the original "Something Wicked" song cycle (from the album Something Wicked This Way Comes). The re-recorded tracks are also slightly rearranged, with the piano intro to "The Coming Curse" notably absent in the new version. This EP was reissued as part of Iced Earth's Box of the Wicked collection.

The four songs features most of the band's October 2006-March 2007 lineup, with guitarist Jon Schaffer playing bass, as former bassist James "Bo" Wallace left before recording began. Overture of the Wicked is the only official Iced Earth release with former guitarist Tim Mills, and the first with drummer Brent Smedley since 1999's The Melancholy E.P.

On the reasoning behind doing the EP, Tim Owens said:

Because it's what the story is about, the next two records are about. So Jon wanted to just re-release that, put that out there so that people kind of start getting familiar with it again. I mean, he wouldn't have done anything else, it just fit what we were doing and since the album was coming out, he thought while we're here let's do the "Something Wicked Trilogy", re-record it. Start the story off again; familiarize people before a couple of times.

—

== Track listing ==
No.	Title	Lyrics	Music	Length
1.	"Ten Thousand Strong"	Jon Schaffer	Schaffer	3:54
2.	"Prophecy"	Schaffer	Schaffer	6:00
3.	"Birth of the Wicked"	Schaffer	Schaffer	4:31
4.	"The Coming Curse"	Schaffer	Schaffer	8:00
Total length:				22:25

== Personnel ==
- Jon Schaffer – rhythm and lead guitars, bass guitar, backing vocals
- Tim "Ripper" Owens – lead vocals
- Tim Mills – lead guitar
- Brent Smedley – drums
