= Brush-fires of the Mind =

Studio album by Sons of Liberty
- Released: December 18, 2009 (digital); July 12, 2010 (CD/LP)
- Genre: Heavy metal
- Length: 45:50
- Label: Century Media Records

Sons of Liberty chronology
Brush-fires of the Mind (2009)	Spirit of the Times (2011)

Professional ratings
Review scores
Source	Rating
About.com	3.5/5 stars
Metal Hammer (GER)	4/7 stars
Jukebox:Metal	3/5 stars

Brush-fires of the Mind is the only album by Jon Schaffer's heavy metal solo-project Sons of Liberty. The album was released on the project's website on December 18, 2009, to download for free if you sign up for the Sons of Liberty newsletter. It is also available as a high quality download, however, this one is not for free. All music and lyrics were written by Schaffer himself, he also plays all guitars and sings lead vocals.

The album has been released on CD (regular version and limited edition) and 12" vinyl by Century Media Records on July 12, 2010

The album is a concept album about corrupt world leaders holding the rest of the world in slavery. It is a subject that Schaffer holds close to heart, as is shown on the band's website where there are links and references to literature dealing with the subject. Between some of the songs Schaffer quotes, among others, Thomas Jefferson and Abraham Lincoln. Also, there are several speeches heard by various modern world leaders, including John F. Kennedy. Several different covers of the album exist.

== Track listing ==
Music and lyrics written by Jon Schaffer.

1. "Jekyll Island" – 7:19
2. "Don't Tread on Me" – 5:08
3. "False Flag" – 4:50
4. "Our Dying Republic" – 3:48
5. "Indentured Servitude" – 4:42
6. "Tree of Liberty" – 6:11
7. "Feeling Helpless?" – 4:01
8. "The Cleansing Wind" – 4:33
9. "We the People" – 5:18

== Personnel ==
- Jon Schaffer – lead and backing vocals, rhythm and lead guitar, drum programming

=== Guest musicians ===
- Jim Morris – guitar solos on "Jekyll Island", "Our Dying Republic", "Indentured Servitude", "The Cleansing Wind", and backing vocals and additional drum programming
- Ruben Drake – bass guitar and electric stand-up bass
- Troy Seele – guitar solos on "Don't Tread on Me", "Feeling Helpless"
- Howard Helm – piano on "The Cleansing Wind", backing vocals
- Jeff Brandt – backing vocals
