= Morrisound Recording =

Audio recording studio in Florida, USA

Coordinates: 28°03′28″N 82°23′36″W

- Type: Recording studio
- Industry: Music
- Founded: 1981; 45 years ago in Tampa, Florida, U.S.
- Founder: Jim and Tom Morris
- Headquarters: 8003 North 9th Street, Tampa, Florida, U.S.
- Website: morrisound.com

Morrisound Recording (also Morrisound Studios) is an audio recording facility in Tampa, Florida, United States, owned and operated by brothers Jim and Tom Morris. Since its opening in 1981, Morrisound has been responsible for the popularization of death metal, but caters to other genres.

== History ==
Producer Scott Burns recalled thinking the production on albums of thrash metal bands such as Dark Angel, Kreator or Celtic Frost "sounded like shit". He said, "There was this general consensus that nobody who produced stuff like Sepultura gave a shit about it [...] no one ever tried to make them sound good. And at the time, Jim and Tom really were pioneers as far as doing drum triggering. And they invested money in PC electronics and figured [out] how to use that to make high really good recordings." Scott joined them and learned how to record and produce from trial and error.

Morris and Burns spent countless hours attempting to achieve the heaviest possible drum sounds. Morris stated, "[...] you gotta have a drum kit that can cut through a wall of blasting guitars. So it was extremely important to have a good acoustic space and solid engineering technique, and that was something we passed on to Scott and a few other guys we worked with. And eventually, Scott wound up doing a bunch of wall-to-wall death metal sessions."

Loudwire wrote "With high-quality production that differentiated one band from another, artists in Tampa could carve and cultivate their own identities. Sure, there were similarities [...] to the untrained ear, it was a mess, but that just made it a more exclusive form of music for those who could separate one cacophonic tone from another."

In May of 2025, the studio was awarded a Historical Marker by Hillsborough County.

== Influence and legacy ==
Suffocation guitarist Terrance Hobbs referred to Morrisound as the "Mecca for death metal and heavy metal" during the 1990s. Former Cannibal Corpse vocalist Chris Barnes said "Scott [Burns] knew what to do with fast and brutal bands, and not a lot of guys did at the time [...] It really drew people from the death metal scene down here. That was a big factor in Tampa becoming a haven here. They wanted to be close to the studio".

Notable albums recorded at Morrisound include works by bands such as Steve Morse, Sepultura, Savatage, Morbid Angel, Death, Control Denied, Napalm Death, Obituary, Incubus, Cannibal Corpse, Demolition Hammer, Deicide, Malevolent Creation, Iced Earth, Six Feet Under, End-Time Illusion, Trans-Siberian Orchestra, Atheist, Kamelot, Seven Mary Three, Transmetal and Demons and Wizards.

== Selected albums recorded ==
- Agent Steel - Unstoppable Force (1987)
- Atrocity - Hallucinations (1990)
- Atheist - Piece of Time (1990)
- Atheist - Unquestionable Presence (1991)
- Brooke Hogan - About Us ft. Paul Wall (2006)
- Cancer - Death Shall Rise (1991)
- Cannibal Corpse - Eaten Back to Life (1990)
- Cannibal Corpse - Butchered at Birth (1991)
- Cannibal Corpse - Tomb of the Mutilated (1992)
- Cannibal Corpse - The Bleeding (1994)
- Transmetal - El Infierno de Dante(1994)
- Cannibal Corpse - Vile (1996)
- Cannibal Corpse - Gallery of Suicide (1998)
- Control Denied - The Fragile Art of Existence (1999)
- Crimson Glory - Transcendence (1988)
- Cynic - Focus (1993)
- Death - Leprosy (1988)
- Death - Spiritual Healing (1990)
- Death - Human (1991)
- Death - Individual Thought Patterns (1993)
- Death - Symbolic (1995)
- Death - The Sound of Perseverance (1998)
- Deicide - Sacrificial demo
- Deicide - Deicide (1990)
- Deicide - Legion (1992)
- Deicide - Once upon the Cross (1995)
- Deicide - Serpents of the Light (1997)
- Deicide - In Torment in Hell (2001)
- Demolition Hammer - Tortured Existence (1991)
- Demons & Wizards - Demons and Wizards (2000)
- Demons & Wizards - Touched by the Crimson King (2005)
- Doctor Butcher - Doctor Butcher (1994)
- Exhorder - Slaughter in the Vatican (1990)
- Iced Earth - Iced Earth (1990)
- Iced Earth - Night of the Stormrider (1991)
- Iced Earth - Burnt Offerings (1995)
- Iced Earth - The Dark Saga (1996)
- Iced Earth - Days of Purgatory (1997)
- Iced Earth - Something Wicked This Way Comes (1998)
- Iced Earth - The Glorious Burden (2004)
- Iced Earth - Dystopia (2011)
- Kamelot - Eternity (1995)
- Kamelot - Dominion (1997)
- Kamelot - Siége Perilous (1998)
- Kreator - Renewal (1992)
- Malevolent Creation - The Ten Commandments (1991)
- Malevolent Creation - In Cold Blood (1997)
- Master - Master (1990)
- Morbid Angel - Altars of Madness (1989)
- Morbid Angel - Blessed Are the Sick (1991)
- Morbid Angel - Covenant (1993)
- Morbid Angel - Formulas Fatal to the Flesh (1998)
- Morbid Angel - Gateways to Annihilation (2000)
- Napalm Death - Harmony Corruption (1990)
- Nocturnus - The Key (1990)
- Nocturnus - Thresholds (1992)
- Obituary - Slowly We Rot (1989)
- Obituary - Cause of Death (1990)
- Obituary - The End Complete (1992)
- Obituary - World Demise (1994)
- Savatage - Sirens (1983)
- Savatage - Edge of Thorns (1993)
- Savatage - Handful of Rain (1994)
- Seven Mary Three - American Standard (1995)
- Seven Mary Three - Orange Ave. (1998)
- Seven Mary Three - The Economy of Sound (2001)
- Sepultura - Arise (1991)
- Saigon Kick - Water (1993)
- Saigon Kick - Devil in the Details (1995)
- Six Feet Under - Haunted (1995)
- Six Feet Under - Bringer of Blood (2003)
- Six Feet Under - Death Rituals (2008)
- Steve Morse - The Introduction (1984)
- Toxik - World Circus (1987)
- Terrorizer - World Downfall (1989)
- Warrant - Dog Eat Dog (1992)

== See also ==
- Florida death metal
