= Something Wicked This Way Comes (Iced Earth album) =

Studio album by Iced Earth
- Released: June 22, 1998
- Recorded: March 1998
- Studios: Morrisound Studios, Tampa, Florida
- Genres: Power metal; thrash metal
- Length: 61:56
- Label: Century Media
- Producer: Jim Morris

Iced Earth chronology
Days of Purgatory (1997)	Something Wicked This Way Comes (1998)	Alive in Athens (1999)

Something Wicked This Way Comes is the fifth studio album by American heavy metal band Iced Earth. Released on June 22, 1998, it was the band's first album to feature bassist James MacDonough and guitarist Larry Tarnowski, and is the only Iced Earth album to be solely produced by Jim Morris, who has worked with the band since 1996's The Dark Saga.

Recorded in March 1998, Something Wicked This Way Comes introduced Jon Schaffer's fictional story Something Wicked Saga, which would be later expanded upon by the band. The song "Watching Over Me" was written as a tribute to Schaffer's deceased childhood friend Bill Blackmon, who inspired the name "Iced Earth". The album received mixed reviews; it was noted as significantly "heavier" than its predecessor, The Dark Saga. It charted in Germany and Austria. During the album's supporting tour, the band recorded their first live album, entitled Alive in Athens.

== Background ==
As with the band's previous album, The Dark Saga, Iced Earth were again faced with line-up changes. Long-time guitarist Randall Shawver left the band prior to the recording of Something Wicked This Way Comes, as did drummer Brent Smedley, who was unable to play on the album for personal reasons. Because of these changes, only guitarist Jon Schaffer, vocalist Matt Barlow and bassist James MacDonough were credited as "Iced Earth", making Something Wicked This Way Comes the first of only two albums to feature a three-piece line-up of the band; the other one being The Crucible of Man.

== Writing and recording ==
Musically, Something Wicked This Way Comes is significantly heavier than its predecessor, The Dark Saga. According to Jon Schaffer, because many of Iced Earth's fans felt that The Dark Saga lacked in speed and heaviness, the band tried to have a more diverse collection of songs on Something Wicked This Way Comes. Even though some material had already been written prior to the actual writing process, Schaffer has admitted that he struggled writing the remaining songs, attributing these problems to growing stress. One of the songs written right after The Dark Saga was "Watching Over Me", which is about Schaffer's childhood friend Bill Blackmon, who died in a motorcycle accident just before Schaffer moved to Florida in 1984.

The album is the first to feature Jon Schaffer's Something Wicked Saga. Originally Schaffer had planned to have the entire record be a concept album on the "Something Wicked" storyline, but because some songs unrelated to the concept had already been written following The Dark Saga, the band decided to only have the last three tracks be connected to the storyline. The last three songs ("Prophecy", Birth of the Wicked" and "The Coming Curse") make up the "Something Wicked" trilogy, which introduces the central figure of the saga, Set Abominae (who also appears on the album's front cover).

Something Wicked This Way Comes was recorded in March 1998 at Morrisound Studios, in Tampa, Florida. It is the only Iced Earth studio album not to be co-produced by Jon Schaffer. Instead, Jim Morris (who has co-produced all of the band's albums from The Dark Saga onward) is the sole producer. Because Iced Earth didn't have a lead guitarist or a drummer, the band hired a number of guest musicians. Mark Prator, who had previously played on The Dark Saga, was recruited to play the drums, while Larry Tarnowski was hired as the lead guitarist (although some additional lead guitar parts were played by Jim Morris). Other guests featured on the album included Howard Helm (keyboards), Roger Hughes (mandolin) and Susan McQuinn (flute), among others.

== Release ==
Something Wicked This Way Comes was released on July 7, 1998. For the album's supporting tour, drummer Brent Smedley rejoined the band, while guitarist Larry Tarnowski was hired as a full-time member as well. While on tour, a music video was shot for the track "Melancholy (Holy Martyr)" at Wacken Open Air, 1998. The band also recorded their first live album, Alive in Athens, in Athens, Greece on January 23 and 24, 1999.

== Critical reception ==
Professional ratings
Review scores
Source	Rating
AllMusic	3/5 stars
Chronicles of Chaos	4/10
Metal Storm	9.5/10

Since its release, Something Wicked This Way Comes has had a polarized reaction from critics. Some have viewed the album as one of Iced Earth's strongest, while others have considered it one of their weakest.

Metal Storm gave the album a 9.5 out of 10 and called it "the most important release of Iced Earth", as well as "a must have". On the other hand, Chronicles of Chaos called the album "tried, tested and tired". AllMusic saw somewhat similarly, feeling that the album was "virtually replicating their previous effort, The Dark Saga, but with somewhat less inspired results".

Despite the criticism, several songs such as "Burning Times", "Stand Alone" and the "Something Wicked" trilogy received considerable praise. Metal Storm was impressed by the musicianship of "Stand Alone", and called the "Something Wicked" trilogy "the best piece of music that Iced Earth [have] ever played". Allmusic also felt that the band seemed most at home during the "Something Wicked" trilogy. "Burning Times" and "Stand Alone" were also some of Allmusic's track picks.

In 2019, Metal Hammer ranked Something Wicked This Way Comes as the 11th best power metal album of all time.

== Track listing ==
All songs written by Jon Schaffer, except where noted.

No.	Title	Writer(s)	Length
1.	"Burning Times"	Matt Barlow; Schaffer	3:44
2.	"Melancholy (Holy Martyr)"		4:47
3.	"Disciples of the Lie"		4:03
4.	"Watching Over Me"		4:28
5.	"Stand Alone"	Barlow; Schaffer	2:44
6.	"Consequences"		5:36
7.	"My Own Savior"	Barlow; Jim Morris; Schaffer	3:39
8.	"Reaping Stone"	Barlow; James MacDonough; Schaffer	4:02
9.	"1776" (instrumental)		3:33
10.	"Blessed Are You"		5:05
11.	"Prophecy"		6:18
12.	"Birth of the Wicked"		4:16
13.	"The Coming Curse"		9:33
Total length:			61:56

Japanese bonus tracks
No.	Title	Writer(s)	Length
14.	"Stormrider" (live)	Schaffer; Randall Shawver	4:48

2008 Slave to the Dark bonus tracks
No.	Title	Lyrics	Music	Length
14.	"Shooting Star" (originally by Bad Company)	Paul Rodgers	Rodgers	5:16
15.	"Electric Funeral" (originally by Black Sabbath)	Geezer Butler	Butler; Tony Iommi; Ozzy Osbourne; Bill Ward	4:53
16.	"The Ripper" (originally by Judas Priest)	Glenn Tipton	Tipton	2:44

== Personnel ==
Iced Earth

- Matt Barlow – vocals
- Jon Schaffer – guitar
- James MacDonough – bass guitar

Additional musicians

- Howard Helm – piano (on track 13)
- Roger Hughes – mandolin (on track 10)
- Tracy Marie LaBarbera – backing vocals (on tracks 2, 4 and 7)
- Susan McQuinn – flute (on track 9)
- Jim Morris – keyboards, backing vocals, lead guitar (on track 4)
- Mark Prator – drums
- Larry Tarnowski – lead guitar (on all except track 4)

Other personnel

- Jim Morris – producer, engineer
- Greg Capullo – artwork
- Travis Smith – artwork
- Olga MacRae – photography
- Michael Haynes – photography
- Carsten Drescher – layout
- Philipp Schulte – product coordination

== Chart positions ==
Year	Chart	Position
1998	German Charts	19
1998	Austrian Charts	50
