= Iced Earth =

American heavy metal band

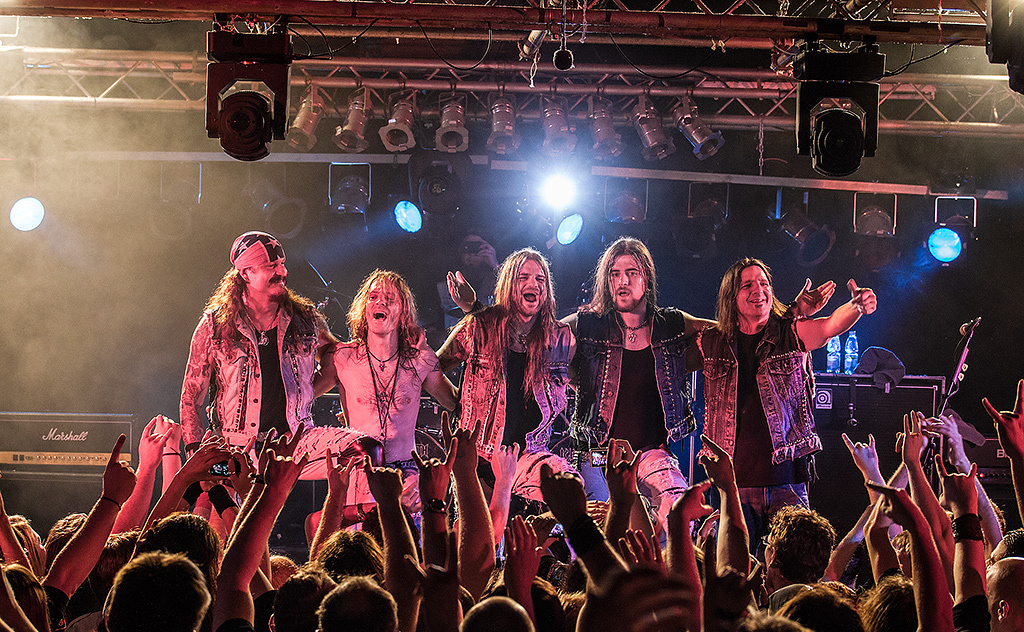
- Iced Earth in 2012

Background information
- Also known as: The Rose (1984–1985); Purgatory (1985–1988)
- Origin: Tampa, Florida, U.S.
- Genres: Thrash metal; power metal; heavy metal
- Years active: 1984–2021 (on hiatus)
- Labels: Century Media; SPV
- Spinoffs: Demons & Wizards; Sons of Liberty
- Members: Jon Schaffer
- Past members: (See: list of former band members)
- Website: icedearth.com

Iced Earth is an American heavy metal band currently composed of only bandleader Jon Schaffer, formed in Tampa, Florida, and based in Columbus, Indiana. They were formed in 1984 under the name the Rose, then Purgatory, by guitarist and main songwriter Schaffer and original drummer Greg Seymour. Iced Earth released their debut album in 1990 and have since released twelve studio albums, four EPs, three compilations, three box sets, three live albums and eleven music videos.

After releasing the demo EP Enter the Realm (1989) and signing to Century Media Records, the band released two full-length studio albums – Iced Earth (1990) and Night of the Stormrider (1991) – before taking a two-year hiatus from 1992 to 1994, after which the band returned with new lead vocalist Matt Barlow. Iced Earth went on to release four studio albums with him in over half a decade: Burnt Offerings (1995), The Dark Saga (1996), Something Wicked This Way Comes (1998) and Horror Show (2001).

After Horror Show, Barlow quit the band and joined the police force, while Iced Earth continued on with Tim "Ripper" Owens, formerly of Judas Priest, on vocals. With Owens, the band released two studio albums (2004's The Glorious Burden and 2007's Framing Armageddon). In late 2007, Barlow rejoined the band, and they recorded one more album with him: The Crucible of Man (2008). In 2011, Barlow once again left Iced Earth, and was replaced by Into Eternity frontman Stu Block. Dystopia, Block's first album with the group, was released that October; the album received a positive response, with some critics calling it one of Iced Earth's best albums. The group recorded two more albums with Block: Plagues of Babylon (2014) and Incorruptible (2017).

Iced Earth has had numerous lineup changes; as of 2021, there had been over thirty musicians in and out of the band since its formation, with Schaffer as the sole constant member. Following Schaffer's January 2021 arrest by the FBI for his involvement in the 2021 United States Capitol attack, the rest of the lineup departed, and the band was dropped from their longtime label Century Media. Schaffer was sentenced to three years probation in 2024, and pardoned by President Donald Trump in January 2025.

== History ==
=== Formation and early years (1984–1989) ===
The central figure of Iced Earth is guitarist Jon Schaffer, who formed the band on January 20, 1985, in Tampa, Florida. Schaffer's original vision for the band started under the moniker The Rose in 1984.

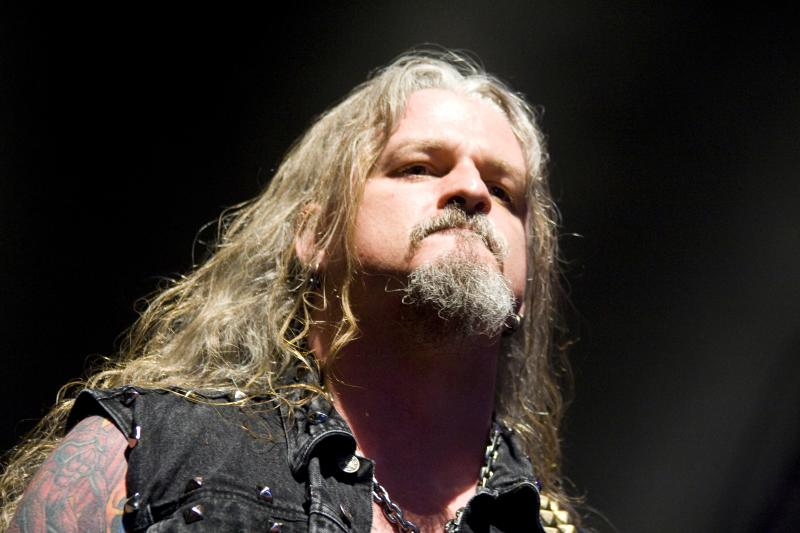
Guitarist Jon Schaffer, who founded the band in 1984, is the only remaining member of Iced Earth.

The group was short-lived, after which Schaffer formed a band called Purgatory. The group recorded a demo in 1985, titled Psychotic Dreams. In 1988, Purgatory changed its name to Iced Earth. According to Schaffer, a friend of his who died in a motorcycle accident prior to Schaffer moving to Florida was responsible for the name. In 1989, Iced Earth recorded another demo called Enter the Realm, with the lineup of Gene Adam on vocals, Randall Shawver on lead guitar, Dave Abell on bass, Greg Seymour on drums and Schaffer on rhythm guitar and vocals. All of the songs on Enter the Realm would later appear on the band's debut album, with the exception of "Nightmares" and the title track.

=== Self-titled debut album and Night of the Stormrider (1990–1993) ===
After getting signed to Century Media Records, the band, now with Mike McGill on drums, recorded their debut album at Morrisound Recording, with Tom Morris and Schaffer as producers. Iced Earth was released in November 1990 in Europe and on February 25, 1991, in the US. Following the album's release, Iced Earth toured Europe with Blind Guardian.

Prior to recording their second album, singer Gene Adam was let go from the band after he refused to take singing lessons. Adam was subsequently replaced by John Greely, as was drummer McGill by Richey Secchiari. The album, entitled Night of the Stormrider, was again recorded at Morrisound Recording, with Schaffer and Morris as producers. The album was released on November 11, 1991, in Europe, but in the US, the release was delayed until April 1992, so the album wouldn't compete with the group's debut album. Following Night of the Stormrider's release, Iced Earth again toured Europe with Blind Guardian.

=== Burnt Offerings and The Dark Saga (1994–1997) ===
Following the supporting tour for Night of the Stormrider, Iced Earth entered a two-year hiatus from 1992 to 1994. During this downtime, the band was faced with issues that almost resulted in them breaking up, but eventually Iced Earth resurfaced with Burnt Offerings. Heralded as Iced Earth's heaviest album, Burnt Offerings was released on April 14, 1995, and was the band's first album to feature drummer Rodney Beasley and vocalist Matthew Barlow.

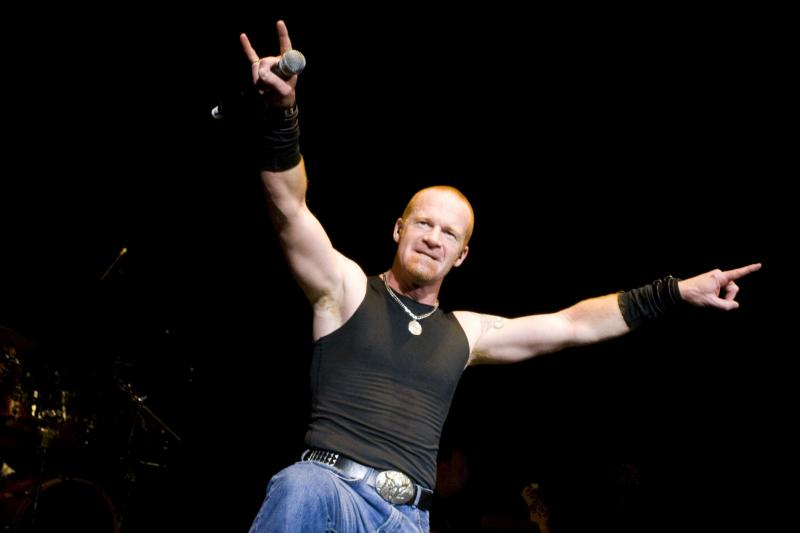
Matt Barlow joined the band for 1995's Burnt Offerings. He would record three more albums with Iced Earth before his first departure from the band in 2003.

In January 1996, Iced Earth began recording their fourth studio album, this time with Tom Morris' brother Jim Morris acting as co-producer, along with Schaffer. The album was also the first to feature drummer Mark Prator, and the last to feature longtime bassist Dave Abell, who left the group after finishing recording. Although Abell was credited for playing on the album, bassist Keith Menser appears on the back cover, because Century Media demanded the touring lineup to appear on the cover. Menser was fired after he didn't learn any of the band's songs for the tour, so he was soon replaced by James MacDonough. Mark Prator was also let go from the band, and was subsequently replaced by Brent Smedley. Released on May 23, 1996, The Dark Saga was a concept album based on the comic book character Spawn. Musically, the album was much more melodic and straightforward than previous Iced Earth albums. For the supporting tour, Iced Earth was joined by Nevermore.

On April 21, 1997, Iced Earth released their first compilation album: Days of Purgatory. The album featured songs from their first two albums, as well as the Enter the Realm demo, resung by Matt Barlow, with new drums and bass on some tracks as well. The album also featured a few songs from Burnt Offerings, remixed and remastered.

=== Something Wicked This Way Comes and Alive in Athens (1998–1999) ===
In March 1998, work began on the band's fifth studio album, with Jim Morris returning as the producer. Prior to the recording process, longtime guitarist Randall Shawver left the group. Guitarist Larry Tarnowski handled lead guitar duties on the album, but was credited as a session musician rather than a full-time member. Brent Smedley was also unable to play on the album for personal reasons and was temporarily replaced by Mark Prator, whom Smedley had originally replaced in 1996. Released on June 17, 1998, Something Wicked This Way Comes was notable for featuring the debut of Schaffer's Something Wicked Saga, which he would expand upon on future albums. While on the supporting tour for Something Wicked This Way Comes (with Brent Smedley back on drums), the band recorded their first live album in Athens, Greece on January 23 and 24, 1999. Entitled Alive in Athens, the three-CD set was recorded in front of a sold-out audience (both nights) at the Rodon Club. The album was released on July 19, 1999.

Also in 1999, the band released The Melancholy E.P. Originally conceived as a radio-only single, the EP contained three previously released songs ("Melancholy (Holy Martyr)", "Watching Over Me" and "I Died for You"), as well as two new ones (cover versions of Bad Company's "Shooting Star" and Black Sabbath's "Electric Funeral"). However, Century Media Records did not end up releasing the EP, so it was made available as a limited 1500-copy special release.

=== Horror Show and The Glorious Burden (2000–2004) ===
In 2000, work began on Iced Earth's sixth studio album. Entitled Horror Show, the album contained songs based on horror films and literature, such as Dracula, The Phantom of the Opera and the Wolf Man. Released on June 26, 2001, the album was the band's first to feature drummer Richard Christy, and the third with guitarist Larry Tarnowski (now a full-time member). Originally, Steve di Giorgio played bass on the album, but left the group after the recording process. According to Schaffer, Di Giorgio was required and agreed to go on tour, but left due to "prior commitments". He was replaced by James MacDonough. Horror Show was also the first Iced Earth album to be partially recorded at Schaffer's home studio "Schaffer Sound".

On November 26, 2001 (March 5, 2002, in America) the band released the box set Dark Genesis, which featured the band's first three albums plus the Enter the Realm demo, remastered and remixed with new cover art. The set also featured a new album, entitled Tribute to the Gods. It was Iced Earth's seventh studio album, featuring songs from such bands as Iron Maiden, Kiss and Blue Öyster Cult.

After the events of 9/11, Matt Barlow stated that he wanted to start contributing to the "real world". Barlow approached Schaffer with this in late 2002, but Schaffer convinced Barlow to stay with the band. When Iced Earth began recording their next studio album, Schaffer realized that Barlow's vocals were not what he desired; he felt that they lacked passion and quality, so he decided to let Barlow go after all. Barlow became a police officer in the Georgetown Police Dept. in Georgetown, Delaware.

After Barlow's departure, Iced Earth continued work on their next album, and eventually Schaffer got Tim "Ripper" Owens, from Judas Priest, to sing on the record as a favor. Owens, who was still in Judas Priest at the time, was originally supposed to be credited as a guest musician, but after singer Rob Halford rejoined Judas Priest, Owens joined Iced Earth full-time. Prior to the recording process, Tarnowski was let go from the band, so the lead guitar parts on the album were played by producer Jim Morris and session guitarist Ralph Santolla.

Prior to the album's release, Iced Earth released The Reckoning. The single contained four songs off the new album that the band felt were most likely to get radio airplay. The Glorious Burden was released on January 12, 2004, in Europe and on January 13, in the United States. Much like how Horror Show was based on horror films and literature, The Glorious Burden was inspired by historical events. It was also the band's first album with their new record company SPV. Following the supporting tour, James MacDonough left Iced Earth to join Megadeth.

=== Framing Armageddon and The Crucible of Man (2005–2010) ===
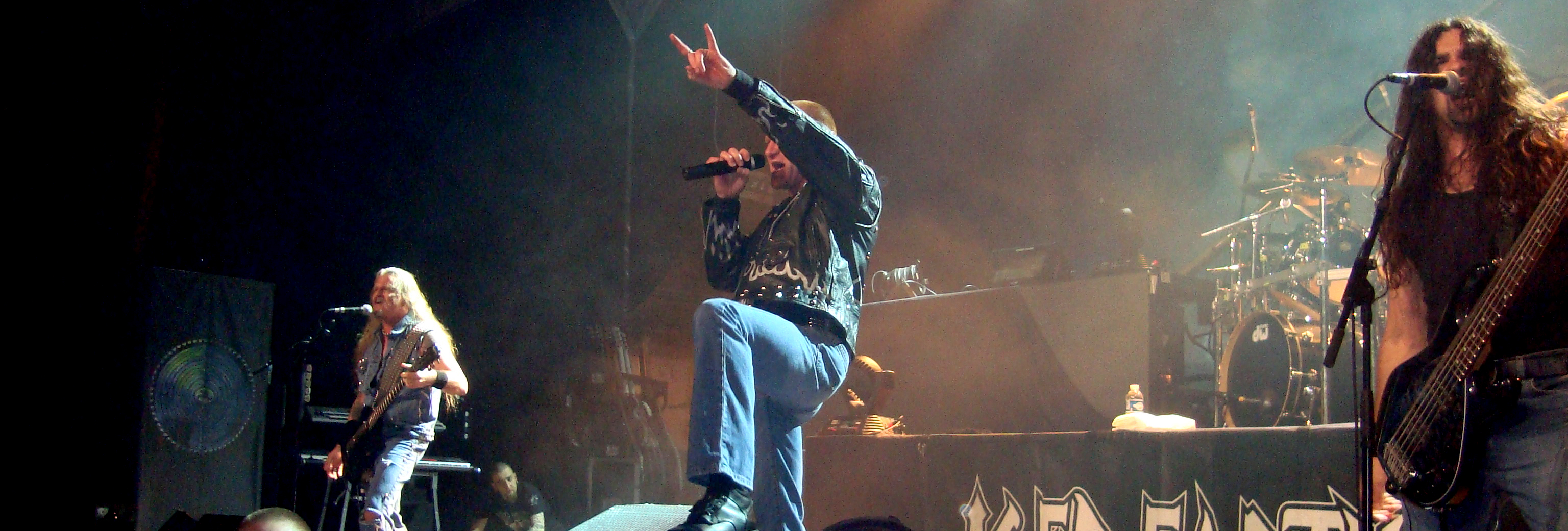
Iced Earth in Stockholm, 2009

After The Glorious Burden, work began on the group's next album, which would be an expanded concept album on the "Something Wicked" storyline from Something Wicked This Way Comes. Before starting work on the album, Iced Earth was faced with multiple lineup changes. In July 2006, Ernie Carletti was chosen as the group's new lead guitar player, but after being faced with rape and kidnapping charges, he was replaced by Tim Mills. Incidentally, Mills was also forced to leave Iced Earth in order to concentrate on his own business, "Bare Knuckle Pickups". In October 2006, Brent Smedley rejoined Iced Earth again, replacing Richard Christy on the drums. Because the band were left without a bassist and lead guitar player, Schaffer ended up performing most of the lead guitar and bass parts on the album (although some tracks featured playing from producer Jim Morris, guitarist Troy Seele and bassist Dennis Hayes) In May 2007, Seele was announced as a permanent member of the band, as was Dennis Hayes two months earlier.

Before releasing the full-length album, Iced Earth released the EP Overture of the Wicked, which featured re-recorded versions of the original "Something Wicked" trilogy as well as a new track entitled "Ten Thousand Strong". Framing Armageddon: Something Wicked Part 1 was released on September 7, 2007, in Germany, September 10, in the rest of Europe, and on September 11, in the United States.

In December 2007, it was announced that Barlow would be rejoining Iced Earth after five years. Following his return, work continued on Iced Earth's next album, originally titled Revelation Abomination: Something Wicked Part 2. The majority of the album's music had been recorded at the same time as Framing Armageddon, and originally Schaffer had planned to finish the album after the end of 2007. However, work on the album had to be pushed back, due to Barlow's prior commitments to his other band, Pyramaze. In early 2008, it was announced that Dennis Hayes had been replaced by bassist Freddie Vidales.

Before releasing their next full-length album, Iced Earth released the single I Walk Among You, which contained a new song from the forthcoming album, as well as two songs from Framing Armageddon, resung by Barlow. After being retitled The Crucible of Man: Something Wicked Part 2, Iced Earth's tenth studio album was released in September 2008. After The Crucible of Man, the band released Box of the Wicked in early 2010. The box set contained Framing Armageddon: Something Wicked Part 1, The Crucible Of Man: Something Wicked Part 2, the Overture of the Wicked EP and the I Walk Among You single, as well as a bonus CD, containing one song from Framing Armageddon, now with Barlow on lead vocals, as well as three previously unreleased live tracks from the Graspop Metal Meeting festival in 2008. The box set also included a poster and a booklet. Also in early 2010, Iced Earth signed a new contract with their former record company, Century Media Records.

=== Dystopia (2011–2012) ===
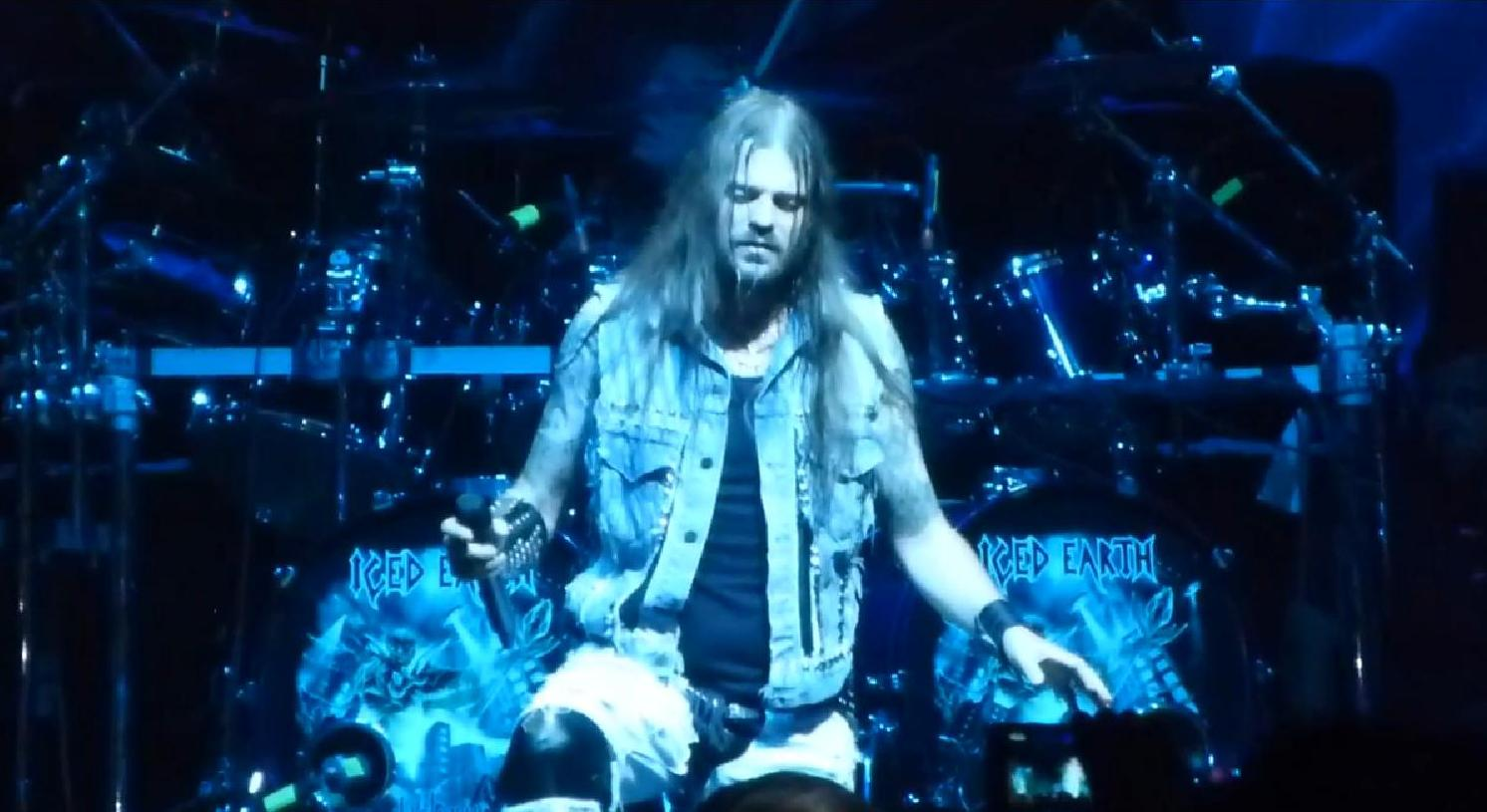
Stu Block joined Iced Earth for 2011's Dystopia and subsequent albums.

In March 2011, Barlow issued a statement on Iced Earth's official website, stating that he was retiring from the band due to family commitments, among other things. Barlow still took part in the band's 2011 summer tour, and played his final show with Iced Earth on August 6, 2011, at the Wacken Open Air festival in Germany. Shortly after announcing Barlow's departure, Iced Earth revealed that Into Eternity frontman Stu Block had been chosen as the band's new lead vocalist. With Block now on board, Iced Earth began recording their next studio album in May 2011.

On June 27, 2011, the band released the DVD Festivals of the Wicked, which featured shows from Metal Camp Open Air (2008), the Rock Hard Festival (2008) and Wacken Open Air (2007). On September 7, 2011, Iced Earth released a re-recorded version of the song "Dante's Inferno", from the album Burnt Offerings. The band's new album Dystopia was released on October 17, 2011, in Europe and October 18 in the United States. While not a concept album, many of the album's songs were inspired by dystopian themes and films such as V for Vendetta, Dark City and Equilibrium. Two songs ("Dystopia" and "Tragedy and Triumph") also featured the return of the "Something Wicked" storyline. After the Dystopia's release, Iced Earth kicked off the Dystopia World Tour, which was heralded as "the most extensive world tour Iced Earth has ever undertaken" and taking the band "to countries it has never previously played".

On April 10, 2012, it was announced that Freddie Vidales had left Iced Earth. He was subsequently replaced by Luke Appleton from Fury UK. On August 19, 2012, Iced Earth recorded a new live CD/DVD in Cyprus, entitled Live in Ancient Kourion.

=== Plagues of Babylon and Incorruptible (2013–2020) ===
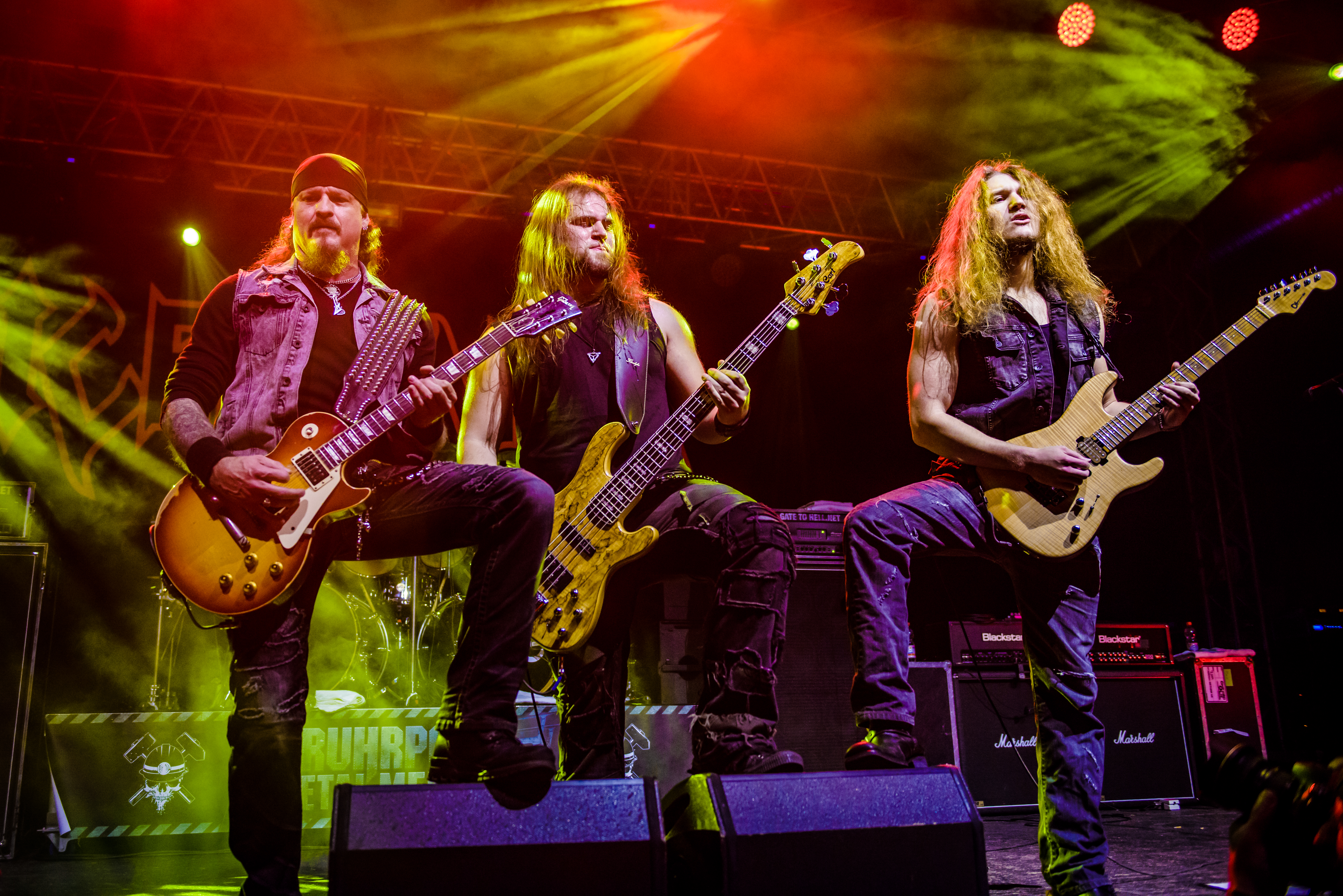
Iced Earth in 2016

Iced Earth began writing new material for their twelfth studio album in early 2013. Drummer Smedley left the band in May 2013 for personal reasons. Raphael Saini played drums on the album, titled Plagues of Babylon, as well as filling in on tour until Jon Dette took over on drums in November 2013. The album was released in January 2014, reaching position #5 on the German Media Control Charts, which is band's highest chart position in their entire career.

On April 7, 2015, following a period of inactivity as a result of Schaffer requiring cervical fusion surgery, the band announced that Iced Earth would begin writing for their 13th studio album. The announcement also revealed that drummer Smedley had rejoined the band, replacing Dette, and that the new album was to be tentatively titled The Judas Goat, with an expected release date and subsequent touring cycle in early 2016. In August 2016, lead guitarist Troy Seele announced his departure from the band, citing family reasons. He was replaced on September 25, 2016, by Jake Dreyer.

On December 6, 2016, Schaffer spoke in an interview with Fernando Bonenfant from Metal Wani and announced that the new album would be called Incorruptible, originally due for release in May 2017. On March 13, 2017, the band confirmed that they had completed work on the album for a mid-June release. On April 6, the artwork was revealed with the album being set for a June 16 release. The release of the album also fulfilled the band's second deal with Century Media Records.

On October 26, 2018, it was revealed that Jon Schaffer had recruited previous Iced Earth members Gene Adam (vocals) and Bill Owen (lead guitar)—along with guests Jim Morris (lead guitar), Ruben Drake (bass guitar), and Mark Prator (drums)—to form Jon Schaffer's Purgatory, taking the name from the precursor to Iced Earth. The band had re-recorded old pre-Iced Earth demos, including (in their original form) tracks that were later re-recorded for Iced Earth releases. This EP, titled Purgatory, was released in December 2018.

Iced Earth's 1989 demo Enter the Realm was released on CD and vinyl for the first time on April 12, 2019, exactly 30 years after its original release.

In a Facebook Live chat that took place on April 14, 2020, Schaffer confirmed that, after "a little bit of time off", Iced Earth would start working on their thirteenth studio album for a spring 2021 release. He stated: "[W]orking on a new Iced Earth album is gonna be challenging until we see how all this plays out, because it's an international band. Stu's in Canada and Luke is in the U.K., so that makes it even more difficult for travel…. If we lived in the same town or even in the same country, it would make things a lot easier. But we will [get around to making a new album]…my plan was to focus on it in the back half of this year and have a release in spring of 2021. But the world's flipped upside down and has gotten pretty weird lately."

=== Hiatus since Schaffer's arrest (2021–present) ===
In early January 2021, Schaffer appeared on the Most Wanted section of the FBI after being photographed taking part of the 2021 United States Capitol attack. On January 9, Block posted a message via his personal Instagram account on behalf of the rest of the band members regarding Schaffer's situation:

"Some of you have been concerned by our silence, which we understand. We needed some time to properly process the information and find out some facts before we made a statement. First and foremost we absolutely DO NOT condone nor do we support riots or the acts of violence that the rioters were involved in on January 6th at the US Capitol building. We hope that all those involved that day are brought to justice to be investigated and answer for their actions."

On January 17, it was announced that Schaffer was in FBI custody, on six felony charges, after turning himself in to authorities. Iced Earth and Demons & Wizards were both dropped from Century Media due to these events. On February 15, 2021, vocalist Stu Block and bassist Luke Appleton both announced their resignation from the band as a result of the event. On the same day, Jake Dreyer also announced his departure, stating that he would be focusing on his band Witherfall. By 2024, Smedley had also left.

Schaffer entered a guilty plea of unlawfully entering Congress and obstructing an official proceeding on April 16, 2021, and was granted sponsorship for United States Federal Witness Protection Program. Schaffer was eventually sentenced to three years probation.

A compilation album A Narrative Soundscape was released in January 2022 as a companion of Schaffer's lyrics anthology Wicked Words and Epic Tales. It features 15 songs of the band in "stripped" acoustic-ambient versions and with spoken lyrics.

== Musical style and lyrical themes ==
Iced Earth has been described as power metal, heavy metal, and thrash metal. When asked about the band's musical style, Schaffer, Iced Earth's chief songwriter, said: "We're a metal band. That's what we are. We have every dynamic from Pink Floyd to Slayer and everything in between." In a 2019 interview with Guitar World, he said, "I think that a lot of power-metal stuff is kind of cheesy, actually. This is just something that I'm not into."

Iced Earth's music has evolved and shifted several times during the band's history. On the group's 1990 self-titled debut album, the band's sound was characterized by time changes, acoustic passages and Iron Maiden-type galloping rhythms. Many of these elements carried over to the follow-up album Night of the Stormrider, which added keyboards and piano, as well as some choral arrangements. 1995's Burnt Offerings has been heralded as Iced Earth's heaviest album, and included the band's longest song to date, "Dante's Inferno". As a counter measure to Burnt Offerings, 1996's The Dark Saga featured a much more subdued sound compared to previous releases. The focus was less on technical musicianship, but on emotion and melody. Something Wicked This Way Comes combined elements found on previous albums with new ideas. The "Something Wicked Trilogy", which closes the album, took many cues from the Night of the Stormrider album. Iced Earth continued to expand their sound throughout the 2000s, like adding a full-piece orchestra to the song "Gettysburg" from 2004's The Glorious Burden.

Common lyrical themes in Iced Earth's music have been religion, history, fantasy, literature, and films. The band has also released several concept albums, the first being 1991's Night of the Stormrider. The second, 1996's The Dark Saga, was based on the Todd McFarlane comic book character Spawn. 1998's Something Wicked This Way Comes introduced the Something Wicked Saga, which was later expanded upon on 2007's Framing Armageddon: Something Wicked Part 1, and 2008's The Crucible of Man: Something Wicked Part 2. Iced Earth have also released several albums written around a theme. 2001's Horror Show was largely based on horror literature and films, 2004's The Glorious Burden was inspired by history and war, while 2011's Dystopia centered on dystopian themes in literature and film.

== Band members ==
Current

- Jon Schaffer – rhythm guitar, acoustic guitar, backing vocals, keyboards, mandolin (1984–present)

== Discography ==
- Iced Earth (1990)
- Night of the Stormrider (1991)
- Burnt Offerings (1995)
- The Dark Saga (1996)
- Something Wicked This Way Comes (1998)
- Horror Show (2001)
- The Glorious Burden (2004)
- Framing Armageddon: Something Wicked Part 1 (2007)
- The Crucible of Man: Something Wicked Part 2 (2008)
- Dystopia (2011)
- Plagues of Babylon (2014)
- Incorruptible (2017)
