= Horror Show (album) =

Studio album by Iced Earth
- Released: June 26, 2001
- Recorded: December 2000–January 2001
- Studios: Morrisound Recording, Tampa; Schaffer Sound Studios, Indiana
- Genres: Power metal; thrash metal
- Length: 61:36
- Label: Century Media
- Producers: Jim Morris; Jon Schaffer

Iced Earth chronology
Alive in Athens (1999)	Horror Show (2001)	Dark Genesis (2001)

Professional ratings
Review scores
Source	Rating
AllMusic	4/5 stars
Metal Storm	(7.4/10)

Horror Show is the sixth studio album from the American heavy metal band Iced Earth, released June 26, 2001. It is a concept album based on classic monsters and horror-movie icons, including Dracula, Frankenstein, and The Phantom. It was the first Iced Earth album to feature drummer Richard Christy, and the only album to feature Steve Di Giorgio on bass, though he did not tour with the band.

There was a special limited-edition two-disc set. The second disc included the instrumental track, "Transylvania", an Iron Maiden cover, along with an interview with bandleader/rhythm guitarist Jon Schaffer. There is also a single-disc version with "Transylvania", but without the interview. The song "Dracula" includes the line "the blood is the life", a quote from Deuteronomy 12:23. However, it is likely lifted from the 1992 version of Bram Stoker's Dracula which also features the line. As in "Dracula", many of the lyrics are lifted straight from the movies they were inspired by. Unlike other releases, it features much writing from Matt Barlow.

By the end of the song "Damien" there is a section where Barlow's reversed voice repeats the message that is also in the middle, silent section of the song. So, if the song is played backwards, the true message can be heard. This kind of reversed voice was also done by Iron Maiden in the beginning of their song "Still Life" of their fourth studio album Piece of Mind.

== Track listing ==
All lyrics and music written by Jon Schaffer, except where noted.

No.	Title	Lyrics	Music	Length
1.	"Wolf" (inspired by The Wolf Man films)			5:20
2.	"Damien" (inspired by The Omen films)			9:12
3.	"Jack" (inspired by Jack the Ripper)	Matt Barlow		4:14
4.	"Ghost of Freedom" (inspired by Matt Barlow's own concept [cited by the interview on disc 2])	Barlow; Schaffer	Barlow; Schaffer	5:12
5.	"Im-Ho-Tep (Pharaoh's Curse)" (inspired by The Mummy)	Barlow	Larry Tarnowski; Schaffer	4:45
6.	"Jekyll & Hyde" (inspired by The Strange Case of Dr. Jekyll and Mr. Hyde)	Barlow		4:39
7.	"Dragon's Child" (inspired by Creature from the Black Lagoon)	Barlow		4:19
8.	"Transylvania" (Iron Maiden cover)	(Instrumental)	Steve Harris	4:23
9.	"Frankenstein" (inspired by Frankenstein)			3:50
10.	"Dracula" (inspired by Dracula)			5:54
11.	"The Phantom Opera Ghost" (inspired by The Phantom of the Opera)			8:41
Total length:				61:36

- Some early US pressings and promo versions of the album misspell the title of Track 6 ("Jekyll & Hyde") as "Jeckyl & Hyde".

=== Limited edition ===
The initial pressing was presented in a standard two-disc jewel case with no reference to the tracks on the bonus disc (nor the disc itself) except for a sticker on the front. Because "Transylvania" is moved out of the track list, "Dragon's Child" has its full ending, increasing its length.

==== Disc one ====
No.	Title	Lyrics	Music	Length
1.	"Wolf"			5:20
2.	"Damien"			9:12
3.	"Jack"	Barlow		4:14
4.	"Ghost of Freedom"	Barlow; Schaffer	Barlow; Schaffer	5:12
5.	"Im-Ho-Tep (Pharaoh's Curse)"	Barlow	Tarnowski; Schaffer	4:45
6.	"Jekyll & Hyde"	Barlow		4:39
7.	"Dragon's Child"	Barlow		4:21
8.	"Frankenstein"			3:50
9.	"Dracula"			5:54
10.	"The Phantom Opera Ghost"			8:41

==== Disc two ====
No.	Title	Lyrics	Music	Length
1.	"Transylvania" (Iron Maiden cover)	(Instrumental)	Harris	4:30
2.	"Interview with Jon Schaffer" (conducted by Sumit Chandra)			69:27

== Personnel ==
- Matt Barlow – vocals
- Jon Schaffer – rhythm, lead and acoustic guitar, mandolin, keyboards, vocal
- Larry Tarnowski – guitar solos in all songs except "Ghost of Freedom"
- Richard Christy – drums
- Steve Di Giorgio – bass guitar (studio recording only)

=== Additional personnel ===
- Yunhui Percifield – lead vocal in "The Phantom Opera Ghost" as "Christine", backing vocals
- Richie Wilkison – backing vocals
- Rafaela Farias – backing vocals
- Sam King – backing vocals
- Jim Morris – backing vocals, keys, guitar solo in "Ghost of Freedom"
- Howard Helm – keys (pipe organ) on "The Phantom Opera Ghost"

== Charts ==
=== Monthly ===
Year	Chart	Position
2001	Poland (ZPAV Top 100)	59
