= Matt Barlow =

American heavy metal singer

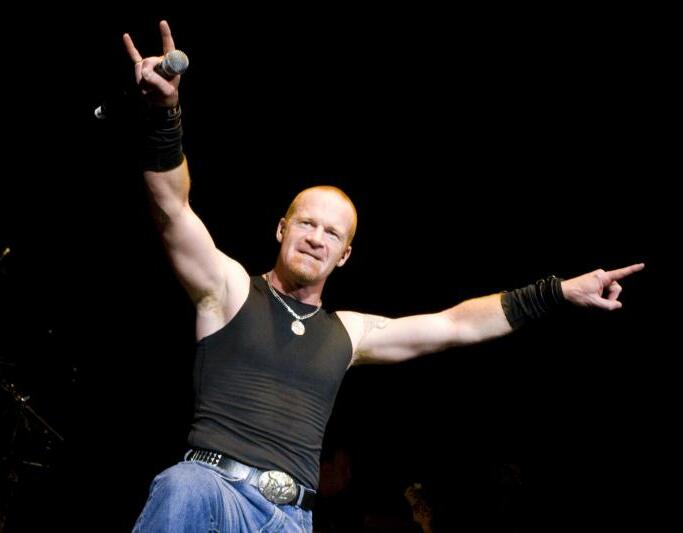
- Barlow in 2010

Background information
- Born: Matthew Barlow; March 10, 1971 (age 55); Biloxi, Mississippi, U.S.
- Genres: Heavy metal; power metal
- Occupations: Singer; songwriter
- Years active: 1988–2003, 2007–2011, 2012–present
- Member of: Ashes of Ares; The First State Force Band; Schaffer/Barlow Project
- Formerly of: Iced Earth; Pyramaze; Cauldron

Matthew Barlow (born March 10, 1971) is an American heavy metal singer. He is the lead singer for Ashes of Ares and former lead singer of Iced Earth and Pyramaze. He is Jon Schaffer's brother-in-law.

== History ==
Barlow joined Iced Earth after the Night of the Stormrider tour with Blind Guardian in Europe, as a replacement for John Greely. The first album on which Barlow can be heard is Burnt Offerings (1995). Barlow left the band in 2003, much to the chagrin of many fans. His reason for leaving was due to personal beliefs related to the September 11 terrorist attacks. He took a look at his life and realized that he wanted to contribute to the "real world" instead of living the illusion of a "rock star." He approached Jon Schaffer with this in late 2002, but Schaffer, known for his persuasive personality, convinced Barlow to stay with the band. When the band recorded The Glorious Burden, Schaffer decided that Barlow's vocals were not what he desired them to be; he believed they lacked the passion and quality that Barlow was known for. He decided to let Barlow go after all and hired Tim "Ripper" Owens, former lead singer of Judas Priest.

Barlow became a police officer in the police department in Georgetown, Delaware. He was also a vocalist for the First State Force Band, which is made up of law enforcement members from different departments throughout Delaware. The band performs for schools, aiming to promote positive values through music.

On April 13, 2007, Barlow returned to music more fully as the new lead singer of Danish progressive power metal band Pyramaze. Barlow accepted the offer to join Pyramaze because it would allow him to return to the music scene, while still being able maintain his current job.

However, on December 11, 2007, it was announced that Barlow had officially re-joined Iced Earth and would be singing on The Crucible of Man and following albums. Pyramaze confirmed that he would remain with them to record their album Immortal, but that their professional relationship would end there.

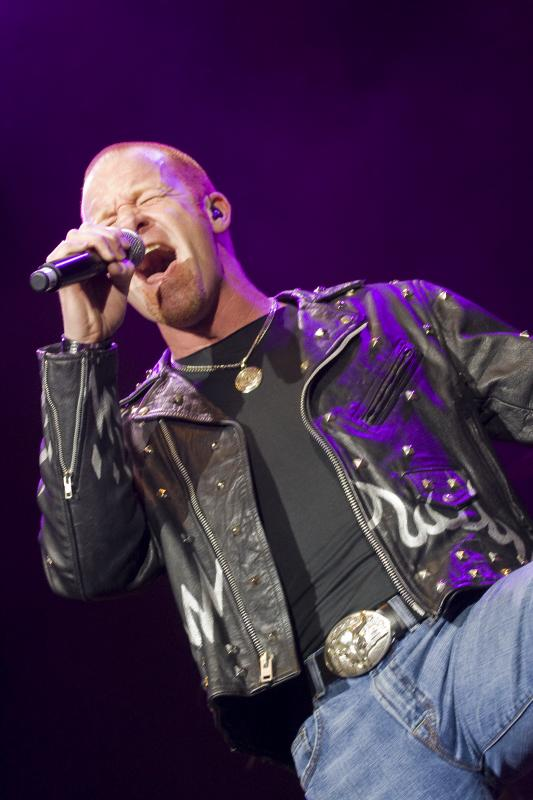
Barlow performing in 2010

On March 3, 2011, Matt Barlow announced that he will again be leaving Iced Earth after the band finishes its European festival shows, citing his commitment to his family and the need for Iced Earth to tour more as his reasons for retirement. On August 6, Barlow performed his farewell show with Iced Earth at the Wacken Open Air festival.

On June 26, 2012, Barlow announced on his Facebook page the creation of a new band named Ashes of Ares with former Iced Earth bassist Freddie Vidales and Nevermore drummer Van Williams, posting on YouTube two one-minute teaser videos. The band signed with Nuclear Blast, and the self-titled album released on September 6, 2013.

In May 2013, Barlow contributed vocals to American power metal band Artizan's album Ancestral Energy, being featured on the album's final track.

On January 1, 2017, a joint project with Jonah Weingarten of Pyramaze named We Are Sentinels was announced by Barlow on his Facebook page.

In 2020 he reunited with Jon Schaffer for a christmas EP, Winter Nights under the banner Schaffer/Barlow Project.

== Discography ==
=== Cauldron ===
- Cauldron Demo (1990)
- Driven by Hate (1993)

=== Iced Earth ===
Studio albums

- Burnt Offerings (1995)
- The Dark Saga (1996)
- Days of Purgatory (1997)
- Something Wicked This Way Comes (1998)
- The Melancholy E.P. (1999)
- Horror Show (2001)
- Tribute to the Gods (2002)
- The Crucible of Man: Something Wicked Part 2 (2008)

Live albums

- Alive in Athens (1999)
- Alive in Athens (2006, DVD)
- Festivals of the Wicked (2011)

=== Pyramaze ===
Studio albums

- Immortal (2008)

=== Ashes of Ares ===
Studio albums

- Ashes of Ares (2013)
- Well of Souls (2018)
- Emperors and Fools (2022)
- New Messiahs (2025)

=== We Are Sentinels ===
- We Are Sentinels (2018)

=== Schaffer/Barlow Project ===
- Winter Nights (2020)
