= Iced Earth (album) =

- European and Japanese cover

Studio album by Iced Earth
- Released: November 1990
- Recorded: August 1990
- Studios: Morrisound Studios, Tampa
- Genres: Power metal; thrash metal
- Length: 43:57
- Label: Century Media
- Producer: Tom Morris

Iced Earth chronology
Iced Earth (1990)	Night of the Stormrider (1991)

Alternative cover
- American cover

Alternative cover
- Remastered cover

Professional ratings
Review scores
Source	Rating
AllMusic	2/5 stars

Iced Earth is the debut studio album by American heavy metal band Iced Earth. It was released in November 1990 internationally and February 1991 in North America. The album has three different covers (a European/Japanese cover, an American cover and a remastered cover). This album was Mike McGill's only album with Iced Earth, as well as the only one featuring singer Gene Adam on vocals.

Iced Earth's first three albums (this album, Night of the Stormrider, and Burnt Offerings) were remastered in 2001, and each had a new cover.

== Track listing ==
All lyrics written by Jon Schaffer and all music written by Schaffer and Randall Shawver, except where noted.

No.	Title	Lyrics	Music	Length
1.	"Iced Earth"		Schaffer	5:22
2.	"Written on the Walls"	Gene Adam	Adam; Shawver; Schaffer; Dave Abell	6:06
3.	"Colors"			4:50
4.	"Curse the Sky"			4:41
5.	"Life and Death"			6:07
6.	"Solitude"	(Instrumental)		1:44
7.	"The Funeral"			6:15
8.	"When the Night Falls"		Schaffer	9:01
Total length:				43:57

== Personnel ==
- Gene Adam − lead vocals
- Randall Shawver − lead guitar
- Jon Schaffer − rhythm guitar, backing vocals
- Dave Abell − bass
- Mike McGill − drums
