= The Dark Saga =

Studio album by Iced Earth
- Released: July 23, 1996
- Recorded: January–February 1996
- Studios: Morrisound Studios, Tampa, Florida
- Genres: Power metal; thrash metal
- Length: 43:54
- Label: Century Media
- Producers: Jim Morris; Jon Schaffer

Iced Earth chronology
Burnt Offerings (1995)	The Dark Saga (1996)	Days of Purgatory (1997)

The Dark Saga is the fourth studio album by American heavy metal band Iced Earth. Released on July 23, 1996, it was the band's first album to feature drummer Mark Prator, as well as the last with bassist Dave Abell and lead guitarist Randall Shawver. The Dark Saga was also the first Iced Earth album to be co-produced by Jim Morris, who since then has worked on all of the band's releases.

Recorded in early 1996, The Dark Saga is a concept album based on the Todd McFarlane comic book character Spawn (who also appears on the album's cover). Because of this, the album features a much more melodic and simplified sound compared to other Iced Earth albums. While the response to The Dark Saga was mostly positive, some viewed these musical changes as a disappointment.

== Writing and recording ==
Musically The Dark Saga is much more melodic and simplified compared to Iced Earth's previous albums (majority of the songs on The Dark Saga are under four minutes long). According to rhythm guitarist Jon Schaffer, the shift in musical style was due to a much more positive feeling going into the writing, as opposed to the band's previous album Burnt Offerings. Schaffer has stated that Burnt Offerings was not his intended musical direction, which is why The Dark Saga is much more keen on melody and vocals.

The Dark Saga was the last Iced Earth album to feature longtime bassist Dave Abell, who left the group after finishing recording. Although Abell was credited for playing on the album, bassist Keith Menser appears on the back cover, because the band's label, Century Media Records, wanted the touring line-up to appear on the cover. Incidentally, Keith Menser was fired right after he showed up for the audition and had not learned any of the band's songs for the supporting tour, as well as showing up with a trunk full of promo material trying to use the tour to promote his own band. He was replaced by James MacDonough. Drummer Mark Prator was also let go from the band, following the recording process, and was subsequently replaced by Brent Smedley. For this reason, Mark Prator also does not appear on the album's back cover. Recorded between January and February 1996, The Dark Saga was the first Iced Earth album not to be co-produced by Tom Morris. Instead, Morris' brother Jim Morris co-produced the album, along with Jon Schaffer.

== Cover art ==
The cover art of The Dark Saga depicts comic book artist Todd McFarlane's character Spawn (on whom the entire album is based). Jon Schaffer, who was a big fan of Spawn, originally contacted the director of promotions for Todd McFarlane, about possibly writing music for the upcoming Spawn film adaptation and animated series. Schaffer eventually met McFarlane and asked if he would do an album cover for Iced Earth, to which McFarlane agreed. Later on, Schaffer decided that the whole album should be based on Spawn, seeing how the character would be on the cover anyway. At first, McFarlane wasn't on board with the idea, but allowed the band to go along with it.

== Release and promotion ==
The Dark Saga was released on May 20, 1996. The cover art work allowed the album to market in comic book shops. Iced Earth also made several appearances at comic book conventions to promote the album. Todd McFarlane was also satisfied with the album. However, Iced Earth's music wasn't used in any of McFarlane's films. During the album's supporting tour, Iced Earth played their first headlining concerts in Germany.

== Critical reception ==
Professional ratings
Review scores
Source	Rating
AllMusic	4.5/5 stars
Chronicles of Chaos	7/10
Metal Storm	8.5/10
Sputnikmusic	3/5

Reviews for The Dark Saga were fairly positive, but some viewed the album as a disappointment, following Burnt Offerings. Much of the negative feedback was attributed to simplified songwriting, and lack of intensity.

Sephiroth, of Metal Storm, called The Dark Saga "a great album that has to be listened to entirely in order to grasp the harmonic line which gives it unity". Adrian Bromley, of Chronicles of Chaos, felt similarly, calling the album "a cool concept record that manages to keep the listener going from start to finish", but was disappointment by the album's reduced heaviness. Eduardo Rivadavia, of AllMusic, on the other hand, was pleased by the musical changes and called The Dark Saga "a strong album, and one of the band's best", while Mike Stagno, of Sputnikmusic felt that the album "is not the best example of the band's skill".

Despite the criticism, the album was praised for Matt Barlow's vocals, as well as Jon Schaffer and Randall Shawver's guitar playing. Eduardo Rivadavia called Barlow's vocal performance "impressive throughout", while Mike Stagno felt that "Barlow's deeper vocal style also helps the songs sound much more emotional". Rivadavia also named Schaffer and Shawver's interplay the highlight of The Dark Saga.

== Track listing ==
All lyrics and music written by Jon Schaffer, except where noted.

No.	Title	Lyrics	Music	Length
1.	"Dark Saga"			3:43
2.	"I Died for You"			3:47
3.	"Violate"			3:38
4.	"The Hunter"			3:55
5.	"The Last Laugh"	Matt Barlow	Schaffer; Randall Shawver	3:47
6.	"Depths of Hell"	Al Simmons	Schaffer; Shawver	3:02
7.	"Vengeance Is Mine"	Barlow	Schaffer; Shawver	4:22
8.	"Scarred"		Schaffer; Shawver	5:54
9.	"Slave to the Dark"			4:03
10.	"A Question of Heaven"			7:40
Total length:				43:54

European limited edition bonus track
No.	Title	Lyrics	Music	Length
11.	"The Ripper" (Judas Priest cover)	Glenn Tipton	Tipton	2:41

2008 Slave to the Dark bonus tracks
No.	Title	Length
11.	"Hellspawn (Mix 1)"	3:42
12.	"Hellspawn (Mix 2)"	3:43

== Personnel ==
Iced Earth

- Matt Barlow – lead vocals
- Jon Schaffer – rhythm guitar, vocals, co-producer
- Randall Shawver – lead guitar
- Dave Abell – bass guitar
- Mark Prator – drums, backing vocals

Other personnel

- Jim Morris – co-producer, engineer, backing vocals
- Kate Barlow – backing vocals
- Michael Haines – photography
- Carsten Drescher – layout
- Todd McFarlane – artwork
- Philipp Schulte – product coordination
