= Burnt Offerings (album) =

Studio album by Iced Earth
- Released: April 18, 1995
- Recorded: Morrisound Studios (Tampa, Florida)
- Genres: Thrash metal; power metal
- Length: 52:39
- Label: Century Media
- Producers: Tom Morris; Jon Schaffer

Iced Earth chronology
Night of the Stormrider (1991)	Burnt Offerings (1995)	The Dark Saga (1996)

Alternative cover
- 2001 reissue cover

Professional ratings
Review scores
Source	Rating
AllMusic	4/5 stars
Metal Storm	10/10

Burnt Offerings is the third studio album by American heavy metal band Iced Earth. Released on April 18, 1995, it was the group's first album since 1991's Night of the Stormrider, after which the band took a three-year layoff. During this time they recruited drummer Rodney Beasley and singer Matthew Barlow, replacing Rick Secchiari and John Greely, respectively.

Burnt Offerings has been described as Iced Earth's heaviest and darkest record. Rhythm guitarist and main songwriter Jon Schaffer has said that the heaviness of the songs were a result of his frustration with the music industry. Schaffer's frustration is particularly evident in the title track, which talks about the problems the band had to endure during its downtime.

The album is also notable for including one of the longest songs Iced Earth has ever recorded; "Dante's Inferno". Clocking in at 16 minutes and 26 seconds, "Dante's Inferno" is based on the Inferno segment of Dante Alighieri's epic poem, the Divine Comedy. The album starts with a spoken line from Bram Stoker's Dracula. The album's original cover art was also a painting by Gustave Doré, of Lucifer from the Divine Comedy.

== Track listing ==
All lyrics and music written by Jon Schaffer, except where noted.

No.	Title	Lyrics	Music	Length
1.	"Burnt Offerings"		Schaffer; Randall Shawver	7:22
2.	"Last December"			3:23
3.	"Diary"	Matt Barlow	Dave Abell; Schaffer; Shawver	6:14
4.	"Brainwashed"		Schaffer; Shawver	5:22
5.	"Burning Oasis"		Abell; Schaffer; Shawver	6:00
6.	"Creator Failure"		Abell; Schaffer; Shawver	6:02
7.	"The Pierced Spirit"		Abell; Shawver	1:54
8.	"Dante's Inferno": I. "Denial, Lust, Greed"; II. "The Prodigal, The Wrathful, Medusa"; III. "The False Witness, Angel of Light"			16:26

On the original CD, released in 1995, "Dante's Inferno" was divided into three parts on a single track. On subsequent re-releases since then, the song has been listed as one track.

=== 2008 Slave to the Dark bonus disc ===
No.	Title	Lyrics	Music	Length
1.	"Burnt Offerings" (Rough mix)		Schaffer; Shawver	7:13
2.	"Last December" (Rough mix)			3:25
3.	"Diary" (Rough mix)	Barlow	Abell; Schaffer; Shawver	6:17
4.	"Brainwashed" (Rough mix)		Schaffer; Shawver	5:26
5.	"Burning Oasis" (Rough mix)		Abell; Schaffer; Shawver	6:06
6.	"Creator Failure" (Rough mix)		Abell; Schaffer; Shawver	6:06
7.	"The Pierced Spirit" (Rough mix)		Abell; Shawver	1:57
8.	"Dante's Inferno" (Rough mix: I. "Denial, Lust, Greed"; II. "The Prodigal, The Wrathful, Medusa"; III. "The False Witness, Angel of Light)			16:22

== Personnel ==
Iced Earth

- Matthew Barlow − lead vocals
- Jon Schaffer − rhythm guitar, lead guitar, vocals, co-producer
- Dave Abell − bass
- Randall Shawver − lead guitar
- Rodney Beasley − drums

Additional musicians

- Howard Helm − keyboards

Other personnel

- Tom Morris – co-producer, engineer
- Tim Hubbard – photography
- Axel Hermann – artwork (on 2001 reissue)
- Travis Smith – artwork (on 2001 reissue)
- Jim Morris – mixing, mastering (on 2001 reissue)
