= Night of the Stormrider =

Studio album by Iced Earth
- Released: November 11, 1991
- Recorded: 1991
- Studios: Morrisound Studios, Tampa
- Genres: Power metal; thrash metal
- Length: 46:06
- Label: Century Media
- Producers: Tom Morris; Jon Schaffer

Iced Earth chronology
Iced Earth (1990)	Night of the Stormrider (1991)	Burnt Offerings (1995)

Alternative cover

Night of the Stormrider is the second studio album by the American heavy metal band Iced Earth, released in 1991 through Century Media Records. It is a concept album centered on an idea that was created by the band's leader Jon Schaffer. Night of the Stormrider is the only Iced Earth album to feature lead singer John Greely and drummer Rick Secchiari. The album was re-released in a remixed and remastered version in 2002 by producer Jim Morris.

== Concept meaning ==
The album's concept is about a man who is betrayed by religion and turns away from it in anger. The dark forces of nature reach out to this enraged man and use him as their vessel to bring death and destruction to Earth. He is commanded to travel to a desert, where he is given visions that reveal the truth of humanity, and warp his mind further to make him the "Stormrider". After the destruction of the world, he is then damned forever into the depths of Hell, also referenced as the River Styx. After being forever damned and taunted by evil spirits, he eventually sees what he has done, and realizes that it is too late to repent.

Professional ratings
Review scores
Source	Rating
AllMusic	2.5/5 stars
Metal Storm	8.5/10

== Track listing ==
All lyrics and music written by Jon Schaffer, except where noted.

No.	Title	Music	Length
1.	"Angels Holocaust"		4:53
2.	"Stormrider"	Schaffer; Randall Shawver	4:47
3.	"The Path I Choose"	Schaffer; Shawver	5:54
4.	"Before the Vision"	Dave Abell; Shawver	1:35
5.	"Mystical End"		4:44
6.	"Desert Rain"	Abell; Schaffer	6:56
7.	"Pure Evil"	Schaffer; Shawver	6:33
8.	"Reaching the End"		1:11
9.	"Travel in Stygian"		9:32
Total length:			46:06

2008 Slave to the Dark bonus track
No.	Title	Music	Length
10.	"Stormrider" (live)	Schaffer; Shawver	4:48

== Personnel ==
Iced Earth

- John Greely – vocals
- Jon Schaffer – rhythm guitar, backing vocals, lead vocals (on track 2), co-producer
- Randall Shawver – lead guitar
- Dave Abell – bass
- Rick Secchiari – drums

Additional musicians

- Roger Huff – keyboards
- Kent Smith – keyboards

Other personnel

- Tom Morris – producer, engineer
- Jim Morris – mixing, mastering (on 2002 remixed and remastered version)
- Axel Hermann – artwork
- Travis Smith – artwork (on 2002 remixed and remastered version)
- Rick Borstelman – artwork
- Frank Albrecht – photography
- Dirk Rudolph – layout
- Philipp Schulte – product coordination
