= Jon Schaffer =

American guitarist (born 1968)

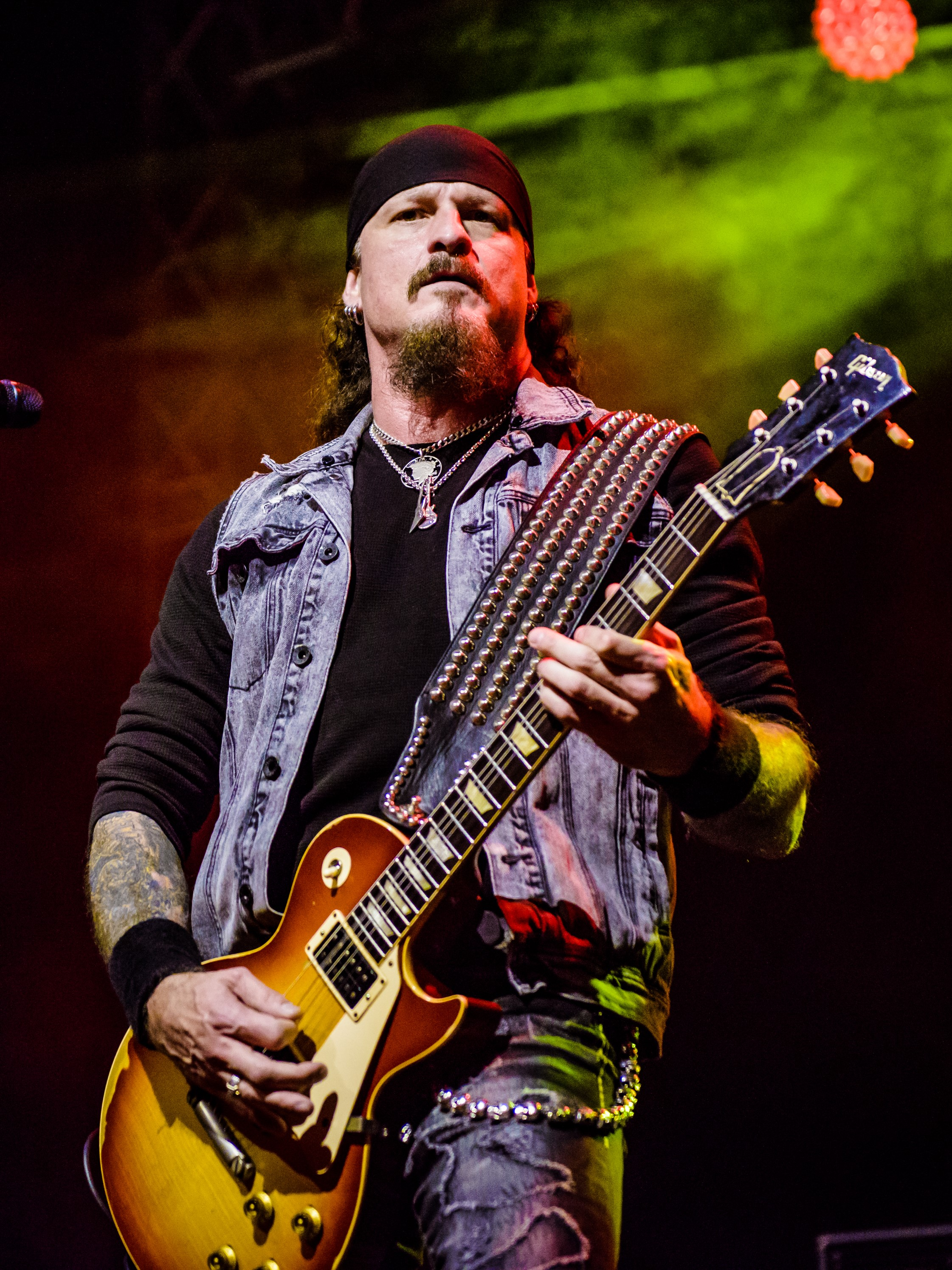
- Schaffer in 2016

Background information
- Born: Jon Ryan Schaffer; March 15, 1968 (age 58); Franklin, Indiana, U.S.
- Genres: Heavy metal; power metal; thrash metal; progressive metal
- Occupations: Musician; songwriter
- Instruments: Guitar; vocals
- Years active: 1984–2021; 2026–present
- Member of: Iced Earth; Sons of Liberty; Purgatory; Schaffer/Barlow Project
- Formerly of: Demons & Wizards

Jon Ryan Schaffer (/ˈʃeɪfər/ SHAY-fər; born March 15, 1968) is an American heavy metal musician. He is the rhythm guitarist, bandleader and principal songwriter of the Indiana-based heavy metal band Iced Earth, which he formed in 1985 under the name Purgatory. He is also the lead singer in his political side project Sons of Liberty and, until 2021, played guitar for Demons & Wizards, his collaboration with Blind Guardian frontman Hansi Kürsch.

Schaffer pleaded guilty to crimes related to his participation in the January 6 United States Capitol attack in 2021 and was sentenced to three years probation before being pardoned in 2025.

== Early life ==
Schaffer was originally introduced to rock music at the age of three. His older sister introduced Jon to bands such as Black Sabbath, Deep Purple, Alice Cooper, and Blue Öyster Cult. In 1979, at the age of eleven, Schaffer attended a Kiss concert with his father. Since then, he has said that this was the moment when he realized what he wanted to do for a living.

Schaffer went to a Lutheran school for five years, during which he developed a lot of anger and rebellion, due to the abusive nature of the pastors. Allegedly, on one occasion, one of the pastors "shoved a bar of soap down Schaffer's throat", because the pastor felt threatened by his refusal to submit, after he could not answer Schaffer's questions about evolution versus creationism. According to Schaffer, this had an effect on him forming a band, so that he could "prove these people wrong".

In 1984, at the age of 16, Schaffer moved to Tampa, Florida. Shortly before he left, one of Schaffer's childhood friends died in a motorcycle accident, which made Schaffer even more determined to move to Florida and start a band. While in Tampa, Schaffer slept in his car. Later he nearly lost his life in a car accident, after which he got an apartment and a job as a roofer.

== Career ==
=== Iced Earth ===
In 1984, Schaffer formed a short-lived band called "the Rose". The band quickly broke up, after which Jon formed what would later become Iced Earth under the name "Purgatory" on January 20, 1985. Schaffer played rhythm guitar and also designed the band's logo. The logo had originally been used for the Rose, but after the band broke up, Schaffer reused the logo for Purgatory and later for Iced Earth.

In 1990, after some line-up changes, the band, now known as Iced Earth, released their self-titled debut album. In addition to playing rhythm guitar and singing backing vocals, Jon also acted as co-producer on the album, as he has done on all Iced Earth albums since. The following year, the band released the follow-up album, Night of the Stormrider, which also featured Jon singing lead vocals on the song "Stormrider".

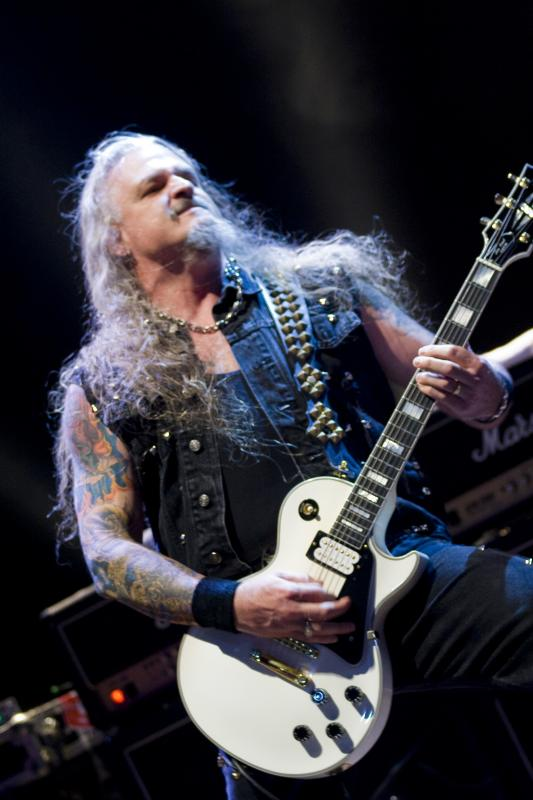
Schaffer performing with Iced Earth in 2010

After some downtime between 1992 and 1995, Iced Earth re-emerged with a new line up, which included singer Matt Barlow, who would stay with the band until 2003. The band released the albums Burnt Offerings and The Dark Saga in 1995 and 1996 respectively, until in 1998, Iced Earth released the album Something Wicked This Way Comes, which featured three songs ("Prophecy", "Birth of the Wicked" and "The Coming Curse") that were based on Jon Schaffer's Something Wicked concept. The songs tell the story of a character that Jon created, called Set Abominae, who also appears on the album's front cover.

After Something Wicked This Way Comes, Iced Earth released the album Horror Show in 2001, after which work began on the follow-up album, The Glorious Burden. Originally Matt Barlow had recorded the vocal tracks for the album, but due to his lack of interest in the band following the events of 9/11, he left the group in 2003 and joined the Georgetown Police Department in Georgetown, Delaware. Matt was replaced by former Judas Priest-singer Tim "Ripper" Owens, who resung the entire album. The Glorious Burden was released in January 2004, after which Jon started work on two concept albums based on his Something Wicked storyline. The first album, Framing Armageddon: Something Wicked Part 1 was released on September 11, 2007, after which, in December 2007, it was announced that Matt Barlow would be returning to Iced Earth. The second album, The Crucible of Man: Something Wicked Part 2, was released September 5, 2008, and featured Matt once again on vocals.

In 2011, after about two years back in the band, Matt Barlow issued a statement saying that he was leaving Iced Earth in order to spend more time with his family. Matt Barlow was later replaced by Stu Block from Into Eternity, who had opened for Iced Earth in 2008. With Block, the band recorded the album Dystopia, which was released on October 17, 2011. From October 2011, to December 2012, Iced Earth toured in support of Dystopia, during which time they recorded the album Live in Ancient Kourion.

=== Demons & Wizards ===
Demons & Wizards was a side project Schaffer put together with Blind Guardian frontman Hansi Kürsch. Schaffer and Hansi had originally met in the early 1990s, when Iced Earth and Blind Guardian toured together. Demons & Wizards released their self-titled debut album in 2000. Besides Jon and Hansi, the album also featured Mark Prator on drums and Jim Morris on lead guitar. The group's second album, Touched by the Crimson King was released in 2005, and featured a number of guest musicians, including Bobby Jarzombek, Jim Morris, Rubin Drake, Howard Helm, Kathy Helm, Tori Fuson, Jesse Morris and Krystyna Kolaczynski.

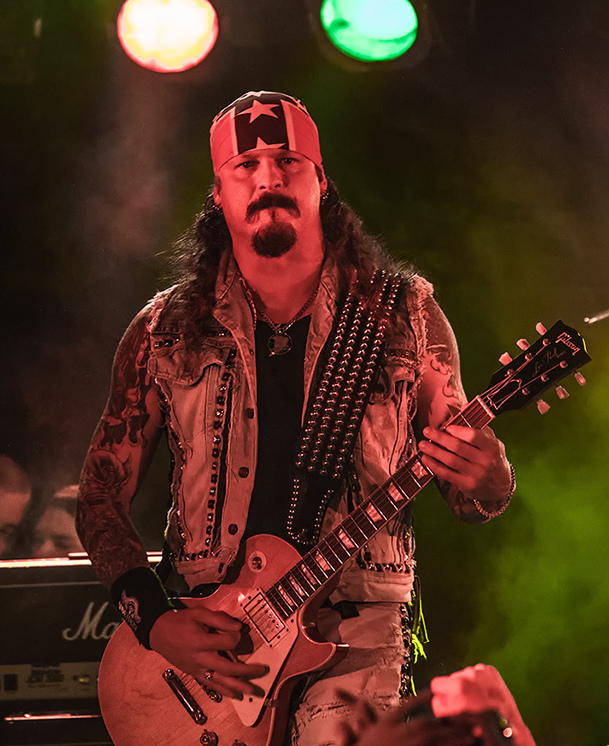
Schaffer performing in 2012

In a video update in 2011, Schaffer and Kürsch talked about the future of Demons & Wizards and stated, that it was only a matter of their schedules lining up when they are going to start work on a third album. III was subsequently released in 2020.

In 2021, following Schaffer's involvement in the storming of the U.S. Capitol, Kürsch announced he was leaving the band.

=== Sons of Liberty ===
Sons of Liberty is a political side project Schaffer formed in 2009. Sons of Liberty's debut album, Brush-fires of the Mind, was released in December 2009 as a free download on the band's website (the album was later made available on CD and vinyl as well). Schaffer sang, played guitar and programmed the drums, but the album also featured a number of guests, including Jim Morris, Ruben Drake, Troy Seele, Howard Helm and Jeff Brandt. During the supporting tour, Jon Schaffer was backed up by Seele, Freddie Vidales and Brent Smedley.

In December 2011, Sons of Liberty released the EP Spirit of the Times. Once again, the album featured Schaffer singing, playing guitar and programming the drums, as well as Jim Morris and Ruben Drake.

In February 2026, Schaffer revived the Sons of Liberty project, releasing Thought Crimes (Volumes 1 & 2), a remixed compilation album of their prior two releases, with the programmed drums re-recorded by drummer Mark Prator.

=== Other work ===
Schaffer used to own a store called the "Spirit of '76". He also participated in the film Silver Circle. In 2012, Schaffer was featured as a guest vocalist on Anarchadia's album Let Us All Unite, performing on the track "True World Order". Schaffer has also expressed interest in doing comic book series based on the Night of the Stormrider album and the Something Wicked Saga.

== Participation in the January 6 United States Capitol attack ==
On January 6, 2021, Schaffer, a founding lifetime member of the far-right Oath Keepers militia, was photographed among those who stormed the U.S. Capitol building. After appearing on the Most Wanted section of the FBI's website, he turned himself in on January 17 and was held on six felony charges. At a November 2020 Washington, D.C. Trump rally, Schaffer told German daily newspaper Die Welt,

"My name is Jon Schaffer. I'm from Indiana. A group of thugs and criminals hijacked this country a long time ago. Now they're making their big move, and it's not gonna happen. And that's what it is. These are globalists. These are the scum of the earth. These are the criminals that are behind all the fraudulent fee on currency, they're behind all the wars, they're behind all the shit, they're behind divide-and-conquer tactics, behind the racial divide. It's all nonsense, it's all garbage. People need to wake up and snap out of the matrix, because they're going down. They've made the move. They're messing with the wrong people here — trust me on that. And we needed it to be open like this — open fraud, open theft. Because now we see you, and you're going down. Mark my words".

"I think this goes beyond President Trump," Jon continued. "President Trump is a populist. He's not your typical Republican. He's not establishment. He's not going out starting wars all over the place, like they do. Which is funny — where are all the Democrats that were anti-war?"

On April 16, 2021, Schaffer agreed to plead guilty to two charges: obstructing an official proceeding of Congress and trespassing on restricted grounds of the Capitol while armed with a dangerous weapon. He was the first participant in the storming to plead guilty. Prosecutors agreed to a recommendation of between 3.5 and 4.5 years in prison, depending on his cooperation in prosecuting other rioters. He would also be granted sponsorship for the United States Federal Witness Protection Program.

According to Schaffer's attorney, while Schaffer was held at an Indiana jail, other inmates made death threats against him, and threw feces at him. He was subsequently transferred to a jail in Washington, D.C. In October 2024, Schaffer was sentenced to three years of probation, 120 hours of community service and $1,200 in restitution and fines. Schaffer issued a statement saying "I profoundly regret my actions on January 6th, 2021", adding "I’m not excusing my impulsive behavior. I was wrong, and I take ownership of my actions. I own the fact that I made a huge mistake, and I wish I never would have gone there. In fact, the consequences have been devastating of my life, family, friends, business, colleagues and business partners."

On January 20, 2025, the day President Donald Trump took office for his second term, Schaffer, among many others was given a Presidential Pardon.

== Personal life ==
In 1996, while performing in Berlin, Schaffer injured his neck, for which he had surgery in 2000. In the early 2000s, he had surgery again, this time for lower-back problems. In 2005, Schaffer's daughter was born, whom he credits for giving him "perspective", that he "never had before".

Besides playing music, Schaffer enjoys studying history and current events, as well as "standing against, and exposing, tyranny". He also enjoys riding motorcycles, scuba diving, white water rafting and exercising. Schaffer has listed Tom Schaffer, Thomas Jefferson, George Washington, Samuel Adams, Patrick Henry, Stephen Toboz, Steve Harris, Ronnie James Dio, Hansi Kürsch, Aaron Russo, G. Edward Griffin and Ron Paul as people who inspire him.

In a 2009 interview with InfoWars founder Alex Jones discussing their mutual political views, Schaffer revealed that "My father was a John Birch guy. When I was a young child I remember things that he and his friends would talk about, concerning the UN and stuff".

Schaffer was irreligious for the majority of his life, and had been critical of organized religion and Christianity in particular. During his incarceration for his involvement in the January 6 attack, Schaffer began reading the Bible and became interested in converting to Christianity, motivated partially by a falling-out between him and his daughter. While living in Florida after his release, he began attending services at several churches in his area, eventually settling on Lakeview Church in Tarpon Springs, whose pastor Tim Miller privately baptized him in his pool. Since moving back to Indiana, he has attended services at Cornerstone Church, a non-denominational, premillennial church in Trafalgar. Schaffer discussed the details of his conversion in a podcast interview with his church in April 2025.

== Discography ==
=== With Iced Earth ===
- 1990: Iced Earth
- 1991: Night of the Stormrider
- 1995: Burnt Offerings
- 1996: The Dark Saga
- 1998: Something Wicked This Way Comes
- 2001: Horror Show
- 2004: The Glorious Burden
- 2007: Framing Armageddon: Something Wicked Part 1
- 2008: The Crucible of Man: Something Wicked Part 2
- 2011: Dystopia
- 2014: Plagues of Babylon
- 2017: Incorruptible

=== With Demons & Wizards ===
- 2000: Demons & Wizards
- 2005: Touched by the Crimson King
- 2020: III

=== With Sons of Liberty ===
- 2009: Brush-fires of the Mind
- 2011: Spirit of the Times (EP)
- 2026: Thought Crimes (Volumes 1 & 2) (Compilation)

=== With Jon Schaffer's Purgatory ===
- 2018: Purgatory (EP)

=== With Schaffer/Barlow Project ===
- 2020: Winter Nights (EP)

== See also ==
- List of cases of the January 6 United States Capitol attack (M-S)
- Criminal proceedings in the January 6 United States Capitol attack
- List of people granted executive clemency in the second Trump presidency
