= Tim Roth (musician) =

Canadian musician (born 1975)

- Born: December 6, 1975 (age 50)
- Genres: Progressive death metal; melodic death metal; power metal
- Occupations: Musician; songwriter
- Instruments: Vocals; guitar
- Years active: 1996-present
- Labels: DVS; Century Media
- Member of: Into Eternity

Tim Roth (born December 6, 1975) is the guitarist, backing vocalist and only remaining founding member of Canadian melodic death metal and progressive metal band, Into Eternity. Roth is very much the mastermind of Into Eternity, plays the majority of their guitar solos and also was originally the lead vocalist. His primary guitar is an Ibanez S470, and has said that he does not use amplifiers in studio recordings, but uses instead a program called Amp Farm.

He has been playing guitar for 32 years. He has a somewhat unconventional style of playing revolved on his unique alternate picking style and sweep/tap arpeggios. His vocal style consists of high pitched clean power metal vocals and a more black metal oriented shriek (complementing the deeper death metal growls of his co-vocalists). He has posted several videos on YouTube teaching viewers how to play Into Eternity songs and the bands musical style in general.

== Discography ==
=== Into Eternity ===
- 1999/2000: Into Eternity
- 2001: Dead or Dreaming
- 2004: Buried in Oblivion
- 2006: The Scattering of Ashes
- 2008: The Incurable Tragedy
- 2018: The Sirens

== See also ==
- Stu Block
- Into Eternity
