= Dystopia (Iced Earth album) =

Studio album by Iced Earth
- Released: October 17, 2011
- Recorded: May–July 2011
- Studios: Morrisound Recording, Tampa
- Genres: Power metal; heavy metal; thrash metal
- Length: 45:05
- Label: Century Media
- Producers: Jim Morris; Jon Schaffer

Iced Earth chronology
The Crucible of Man: Something Wicked Part 2 (2008)	Dystopia (2011)	Plagues of Babylon (2014)

Alternative cover
- Tour Edition cover

Dystopia is the tenth studio album by American heavy metal band Iced Earth. Released on October 17, 2011, it was the band's first album to feature vocalist Stu Block, who joined after previous vocalist Matt Barlow left the band. Dystopia was also the only Iced Earth studio album to feature bassist Freddie Vidales and drummer Brent Smedley until his return in 2015.

The album was recorded during the summer of 2011 at Morrisound Recording, with co-producer Jim Morris. While not a concept album, many of the album's songs are inspired by dystopian themes and films, very much like the group's 2001 album Horror Show, which was largely inspired by horror films and other similar subjects. Two songs off of Dystopia (the title track and "Tragedy and Triumph") feature the return of rhythm guitarist Jon Schaffer's Something Wicked concept, which has appeared on many of the band's previous albums.

During its first week, the album sold over 6,000 copies in the United States and charted in eight countries, including Germany, Finland and the UK. The album was met with a very positive response, with some critics calling it one of Iced Earth's best albums. Many also praised Stu Block's performance and wide vocal range. Dystopia was followed by a world tour which included dates in countries that Iced Earth had never played before, including Cyprus, China and Australia.

== Background ==
On March 3, 2011, Iced Earth vocalist Matt Barlow issued a statement on the band's official website, stating that he was retiring from the band (for a second time) in order to spend more time with his family. Barlow was still going to take part in the band's upcoming festival appearances during the summer, and he played his final concert with Iced Earth on August 6, 2011, at the Wacken festival in Germany.

Shortly after announcing Barlow's departure from the band, Iced Earth announced that Into Eternity frontman Stu Block had been chosen as the band's new lead vocalist. According to band founder and rhythm guitarist Jon Schaffer, one of the CEOs at Century Media told him about Stu Block. Although Schaffer was uncertain about Block's voice at that point, he was impressed by Block's "presence" and "passion." Block was then sent some instrumental tracks of older songs, for which he recorded vocals and then sent them back to Schaffer. He was then flown out to meet Schaffer and to see how the two would gel together. During this time, they wrote two songs together; "End of Innocence" and "Dark City".

== Writing and recording ==
According to Jon Schaffer, his approach to Dystopia was much more focused compared to previous albums from the last ten years or so. Among other things, Schaffer cited his "awakening" and the following Sons of Liberty project for sparking his interest in Iced Earth again, along with Stu Block joining the band.

A large part of the writing was done at Schaffer's home studio in Indiana. According to Block, the way he and Schaffer would go about writing the film-based lyrics was by watching the film, jotting down notes about the plot, and then start writing to the music.

The album was recorded at Morrisound Recording between May and July with producer Jim Morris, who has worked as producer/co-producer and occasional musician on all of the band's albums from The Dark Saga onward. The band began master tracking the album in mid July.

=== Songs ===
Musically, the album follows the same pattern as previous Iced Earth albums, containing a diverse collection of material, from songs influenced by thrash and speed metal, like "Boiling Point" and "Days of Rage", to mid-tempo ballads, such as "End of Innocence" and "Anguish of Youth".

A buddy of mine said, "You know Jon, this whole Something Wicked thing could be true". I thought about it a moment and said, "Well, I don't know about that. But there are some creepy parallels in contemporary life". So as I was thinking about all of the great movies, albums, and books with dystopian themes, I remembered that conversation and it occurred to me that the Something Wicked story could continue in a few tracks here very nicely.

— Jon Schaffer on the idea of continuing the Something Wicked Saga on Dystopia.

While not a concept album, many of the album's songs were inspired by dystopian themes and films, such as V for Vendetta, Dark City, Soylent Green, and Equilibrium. Two songs, "Dystopia" and "Tragedy and Triumph," feature the return of Jon Schaffer's Something Wicked Saga, which had previously appeared on the albums Something Wicked This Way Comes, Framing Armageddon and The Crucible of Man. According to Schaffer, the first song, "Dystopia", is "a step back timeline-wise" from the last song on The Crucible of Man, "Come What May". While "Come What May" "sets the scenario that it is up to us and the decisions we make that will determine the future of the human race," "Dystopia" takes place "in a time when people are in highly controlled prison-like city states". This leads to their "eventual emancipation" in the last song, "Tragedy and Triumph".

The song "Anthem" was described by Block as a celebration of "people, the human spirit, and life", while "Boiling Point" talks about people who are "at the end of their road". "Anguish of Youth" talks about teenage suicide and "End of Innocence" was about Block's mother who was battling cancer.

== Release and promotion ==
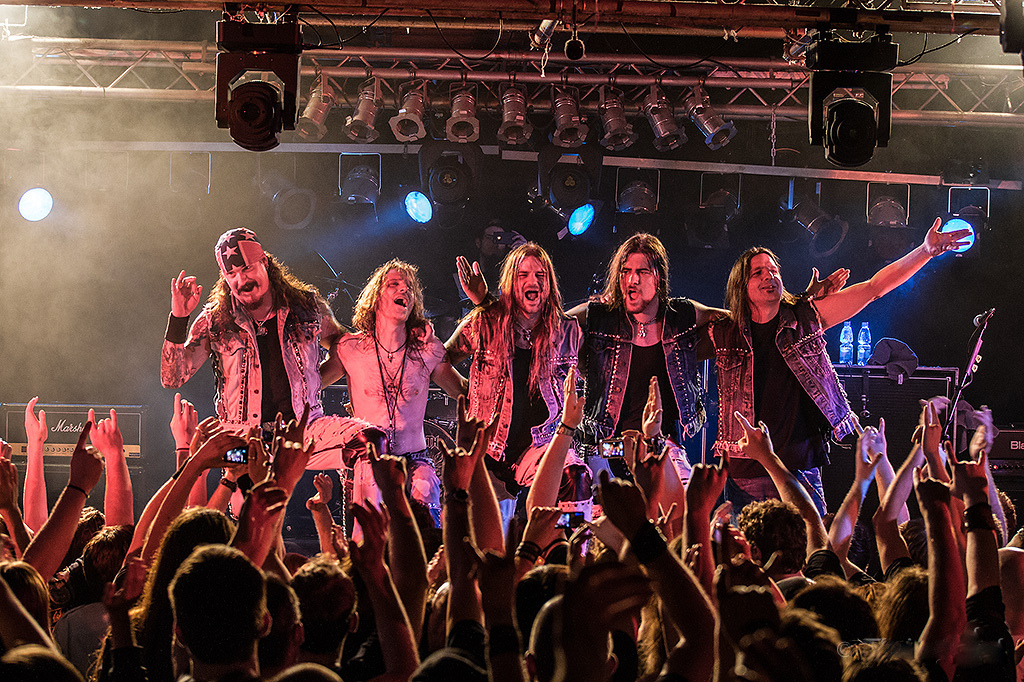
Iced Earth in December 2012.

On July 27, the cover art and release dates for Dystopia were revealed. The album was set to be released on October 17 in Europe and on October 18 in the US. The tracks "Anthem" and "Days of Rage" were released early on a promotional EP that came with the October 2011 issue of Rock Hard magazine. On October 6, the title-track was made available for streaming on Revolver magazine's official website. Between September 16 and October 21, Century Media posted five "making of" episodes online, which featured footage from the album's recording process.

The album was released via Century Media Records on October 17 in Europe, and on October 18 in the US. The album was made available as a normal CD, a gatefold LP and as a digital download as well as two limited editions. The first was a limited digipak that included two bonus tracks, a slipcase, and a printed patch. The second was a limited deluxe box set containing the limited digipak with the printed patch and bonus tracks, as well as a belt buckle, a lighter, a wrist band, a beer coaster, and a set of 3 buttons. During its first week, Dystopia sold 6,100 copies in the United States.

On October 28, the music video for the title track was released. The second music video, "Anthem", was released on January 24, 2012. The video was filmed at the Essigfabrik in Cologne, Germany on December 7, 2011, during the band's Dystopia World Tour.

On June 14, 2012, it was announced that a limited tour edition of Dystopia would be available at merchandise stands on the band's upcoming US tour with Volbeat. The tour edition includes the original full-length album, as well as covers of Iron Maiden's "The Trooper" and Black Sabbath's "The Mob Rules", and the 2011 re-recording of "Dante's Inferno". A bonus disc also contains both music videos from Dystopia, as well as a "Making of Dystopia" interview with the band, and exclusive cell phone skins and desktop backgrounds.

The album was followed by an extensive world tour, which started on October 30, 2011, in Bochum, Germany. Prior to the album's release, the tour was named "the most extensive world tour Iced Earth has ever undertaken" and that it would take the band "to countries it has never previously played". The tour featured a total of 133 dates. Iced Earth also recorded a live CD/DVD on August 19, 2012, in Cyprus.

On October 31, 2011, Iced Earth announced a co-headlining tour across North America with Symphony X. On April 18, 2012, it was announced that Iced Earth (along with Hellyeah) would be supporting Volbeat on their North American tour, starting June 18, 2012.

On the first European leg of the Dystopia World Tour, Iced Earth was supported by Fury UK and White Wizzard. During the tour's first North American leg, Iced Earth was supported by Warbringer. Evergrey, Steel Engraved and Deadshape Figure supported Iced Earth during the third and final European leg.

== Critical reception ==
Professional ratings
Review scores
Source	Rating
About.com	4/5 stars
AllMusic	3/5 stars
BW&BK	8.5/10 stars
Hallowed.se	6/7 stars
Jukebox:Metal	5/5 stars
Imperiumi.net	(10-/10)
Kaaoszine.fi	6/10 stars
Metal Army America	(A)
The Metal Critic	(8.2/10)
Metal Storm	7.5/10 stars
The Newreview	3.5/5 stars
Ultimate Guitar	(8.3/10)

The response to the album has been highly positive. Mape Ollila, from the Finnish music website Imperiumi, called the album "without a doubt Iced Earth's best album as whole, since 1996's The Dark Saga, maybe even better than that," while Max Lussier from The New Review called the album "easily the best thing to come from the IE camp in nearly a decade." Caj Källmalm, from Swedish website Hallowed, also called Dystopia "by far the best full length album from Iced Earth."

Many of the songs, such as the title track, "Anthem" and "Tragedy and Triumph", have been praised. Mape Ollila described the title-track as "a fast, classic Iced Earth composition" and Juha Attola from Finnish website Kaaos, called it "familiar Iced Earth." The title-track was also one of AllMusic's track picks. Caj Källmalm named "Anthem" as one of the album's best songs and Chad Bowar from About described it as "appropriately enough, anthemic." Keith Chachkes of Metal Army America also called "Anthem" "a rousing call to arms against hypocrisy and sycophants who seem to be overrunning the world these days." Jay Brown from Ultimate Guitar named "Tragedy and Triumph" his favorite track on the album, while Ollila called the song "one of the biggest rallifies of Iced Earth's career", and that it makes "an over aged fan boy do a one man circle pit across his living room."

Many have also praised Stu Block's performance as the new lead vocalist. Jay Brown felt that Stu Block "makes himself at home as Iced Earth's new singer on Dystopia." Caj Källmalm called his vocals "very much like Matt Barlow['s], but much better." Mark Gromen from Brave Words & Bloody Knuckles praised Block on how he shows off "his ability to tread the lines of both Tim "Ripper" Owens and Matt Barlow, yet make the song his own" while Chad Bowar also praised Block on how he "brings a varied performance, and delivers the lyrics convincingly no matter if it's an aggressive lower pitched section, traditional singing or belting it out." Keith Chachkes also said that "Stu Block steps right in and does a fantastic job."

On the other hand, some have criticized Dystopia. Juha Attola felt that the album was too much like the band's previous releases, but still gave positive feedback of Stu Block's vocals. In the end, Attola "was left with a somewhat subdued image of the album", but recommended it for "fans of the band, and for anyone who likes traditional heavy metal." Baz Anderson from Metal Storm also recommended the album as "a confidence-boosting album that will be much appreciated and gladly received by anyone with an interest in this long-running and respectable band," but also said that the album "doesn't go beyond being just good."

Metal-rules.com placed Dystopia at number 2 on their "Top 20 Metal Albums of 2011" list.

The album won a 2011 Metal Storm Award for Best Power Metal Album.

== Track listing ==
All lyrics written by Stu Block and music written by Jon Schaffer, except where noted.

Regular edition
No.	Title	Lyrics	Music	Length
1.	"Dystopia"	Block; Schaffer		5:49
2.	"Anthem"	Block; Schaffer		4:54
3.	"Boiling Point"			2:46
4.	"Anguish of Youth"	Schaffer		4:41
5.	"V"	Block; Schaffer	Schaffer; Troy Seele	3:39
6.	"Dark City"			5:42
7.	"Equilibrium"			4:30
8.	"Days of Rage"	Schaffer		2:17
9.	"End of Innocence"			4:07
10.	"Tragedy and Triumph"	Block; Schaffer		7:44
Total length:				45:05

Downloadable bonus track (included in Japanese edition and various retail versions)
No.	Title	Lyrics	Music	Length
11.	"The Trooper" (Iron Maiden cover)	Steve Harris	Harris	4:19

iTunes bonus track
No.	Title	Lyrics	Music	Length
11.	"The Mob Rules" (Black Sabbath cover)	Ronnie James Dio	Geezer Butler; Dio; Tony Iommi	3:08

Limited edition
No.	Title	Lyrics	Music	Length
1.	"Dystopia"	Block; Schaffer		5:49
2.	"Anthem"	Block; Schaffer		4:54
3.	"Boiling Point"			2:46
4.	"Anguish of Youth"	Schaffer		4:41
5.	"V"	Block; Schaffer	Schaffer; Seele	3:39
6.	"Dark City"			5:42
7.	"Equilibrium"			4:30
8.	"Days of Rage"	Schaffer		2:17
9.	"End of Innocence"			4:07
10.	"Soylent Green"		Schaffer; Seele	4:20
11.	"Iron Will"	Block; Schaffer		4:15
12.	"Tragedy and Triumph"	Block; Schaffer		7:44
13.	"Anthem" (String mix)	Block; Schaffer		4:54

== Personnel ==
Iced Earth

- Stu Block – lead vocals
- Jon Schaffer – rhythm guitar, lead guitar, acoustic guitar, backing vocals, co-producer
- Troy Seele – lead guitar
- Freddie Vidales – bass, backing vocals
- Brent Smedley – drums

Other personnel

- Jim Morris – co-producer, engineer, mixer, backing vocals
- Howard Helm – backing vocals
- Lindsay Vitola – backing vocals (on "Anguish of Youth")
- BJ Ramone – assistant
- Jason "Black Bart" Blackerby – assistant
- Nathan Perry – cover and inner sleeve art
- Felipe Machado Franco – cover and inner sleeve art
- Carsten Drescher – layout

== Chart positions ==
Year	Chart	Position
2011	UK Rock Charts	18
2011	German Charts	23
2011	Finnish Charts	34
2011	Austrian Charts	51
2011	Swiss Charts	53
2011	Billboard 200	67
2011	Dutch Charts	85
2011	Belgian Charts	96
