= Fender Jaguar =

Electric guitar

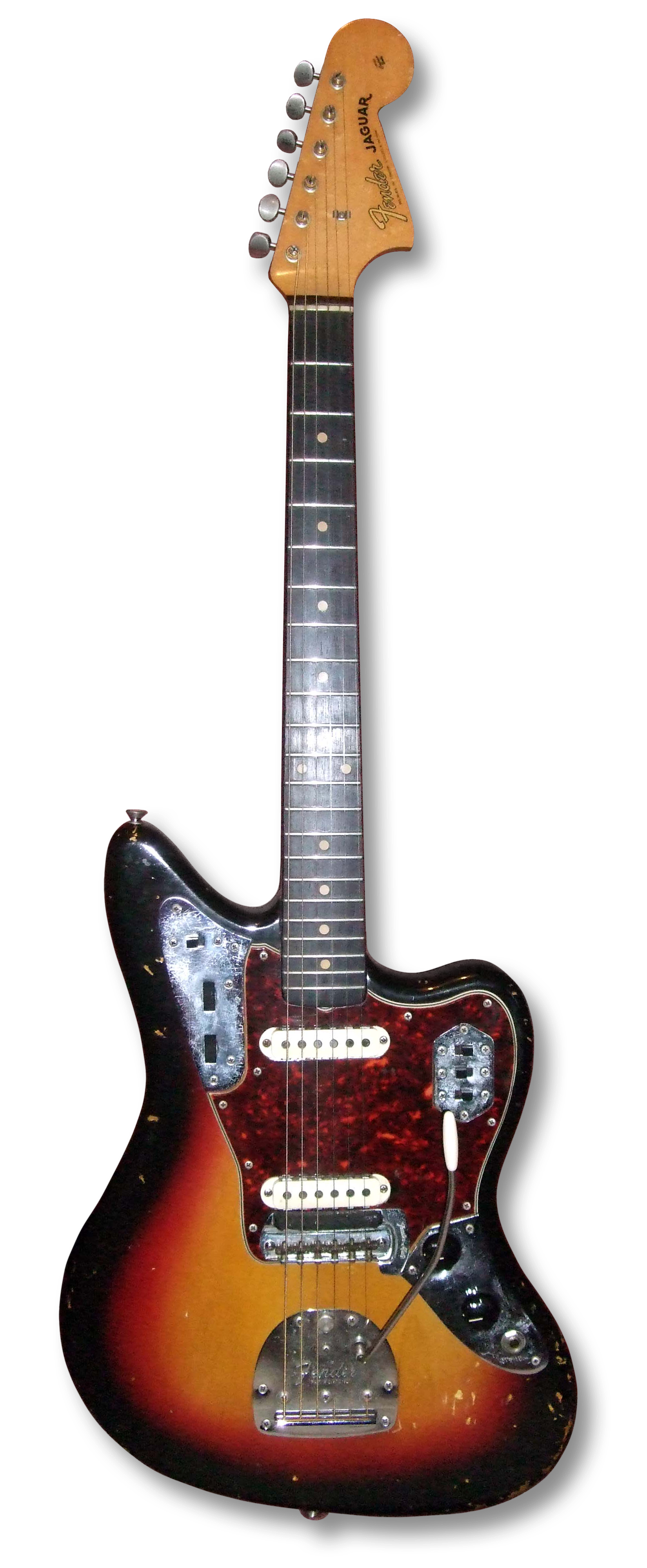
- Manufacturer: Fender
- Period: 1962–1975; 1986-1987; 1999–present

Construction
- Body type: Solid
- Neck joint: Bolt-on
- Scale: 24 inches (609.6 mm)

Woods
- Body: Alder, basswood
- Neck: Maple
- Fretboard: Rosewood, pau ferro, maple, ebony, Indian Laurel

Hardware
- Bridge: "Floating" proprietary vibrato unit Tune-o-matic
- Pickup(s): Standard models include two single-coils; variants may include two humbuckers or 1 single-coil and 1 humbucker

Colors available
- Various 2- or 3-color sunbursts Various shades of white, blue, red, green, etc.

The Fender Jaguar is an electric guitar by Fender Musical Instruments characterized by an offset-waist body, a relatively unusual switching system with two separate circuits for lead and rhythm, and a short-scale 24" neck. Owing some roots to the Jazzmaster, it was introduced in 1962 as Fender's feature-laden top-of-the-line model, designed to lure players from Gibson. During its initial 13-year production run, the Jaguar did not sell as well as the less expensive Stratocaster and Telecaster, and achieved its most noticeable popularity in the surf music scene. After the Jaguar was taken out of production in 1975, vintage Jaguars became popular first with American punk rock players, and then more so during the alternative rock, shoegazing and indie rock movements of the 1980s and 1990s. Fender began making a version in Japan in the mid-1980s, with grunge guitarist Kurt Cobain playing them in the 1990s. Fender introduced a US-made reissue in 1999. Since then, Fender has made a variety of Jaguars in America, Mexico, Indonesia and China under both the Fender and Squier labels. Original vintage Jaguars sell for many times their original price.

== History ==
=== Initial production, 1962–75 ===
Both the Fender company and vintage guitar authorities date the introduction of the Jaguar to 1962. One writer states that the model was introduced in December 1960, but a 1962 ad featuring a Jaguar automobile in the background referred to the "new" Fender Jaguar.

1960s advertising for the Jaguar often had beach themes, underscoring the guitar's appeal to surf musicians. Photographs for the campaign, done by Bob Perine, included photographs of bikini-clad girls on sandy beaches holding Jaguars—many of these featured Perine's daughter and her friends. The guitar was not, however, heavily publicized by surf players themselves, although the Beach Boys' Carl Wilson is featured in one early publicity photo.

The Jaguar never enjoyed the popularity of its Stratocaster and Telecaster siblings. After several upgrades—which included custom finishes, a bound neck, pearloid block inlays, maple fingerboard with black binding, and block inlays—the Jaguar was discontinued in December 1975 after a thirteen-year production run.

=== Resurgence ===
Punk and early new wave guitarists such as Tom Verlaine of the band Television (who can be seen playing a Jaguar on a 2003 album cover) adopted the Jaguar for both contrarian and economic reasons; its lack of mainstream use made it both a style statement and less expensive than guitars of comparable quality. In the 1990s the popularity of the Jaguar and Jazzmaster exploded after they were used by guitarists such as Scott Hill, John Squire, Kurt Cobain (for whom a signature model was introduced), Kevin Shields, Black Francis, J Mascis, Brian Molko, Rowland S. Howard, Thurston Moore, John Frusciante, Will Sergeant and Johnny Marr (who has a signature model). Despite this, Jaguars still fetch considerably less than Telecasters and Stratocasters of similar vintage.

One of the reasons why the Jaguar was used by indie rock artists is the sonic possibilities offered by the bridge construction. The bridge and vibrato unit of the Jaguar and the Jazzmaster help produce sympathetic resonance since there is a considerable length of string between the bridge and the tailpiece. Additionally, by strumming the strings behind the bridge, a characteristic chiming sound can be created, an effect which has been exploited by artists like Sonic Youth.

=== Reissue ===
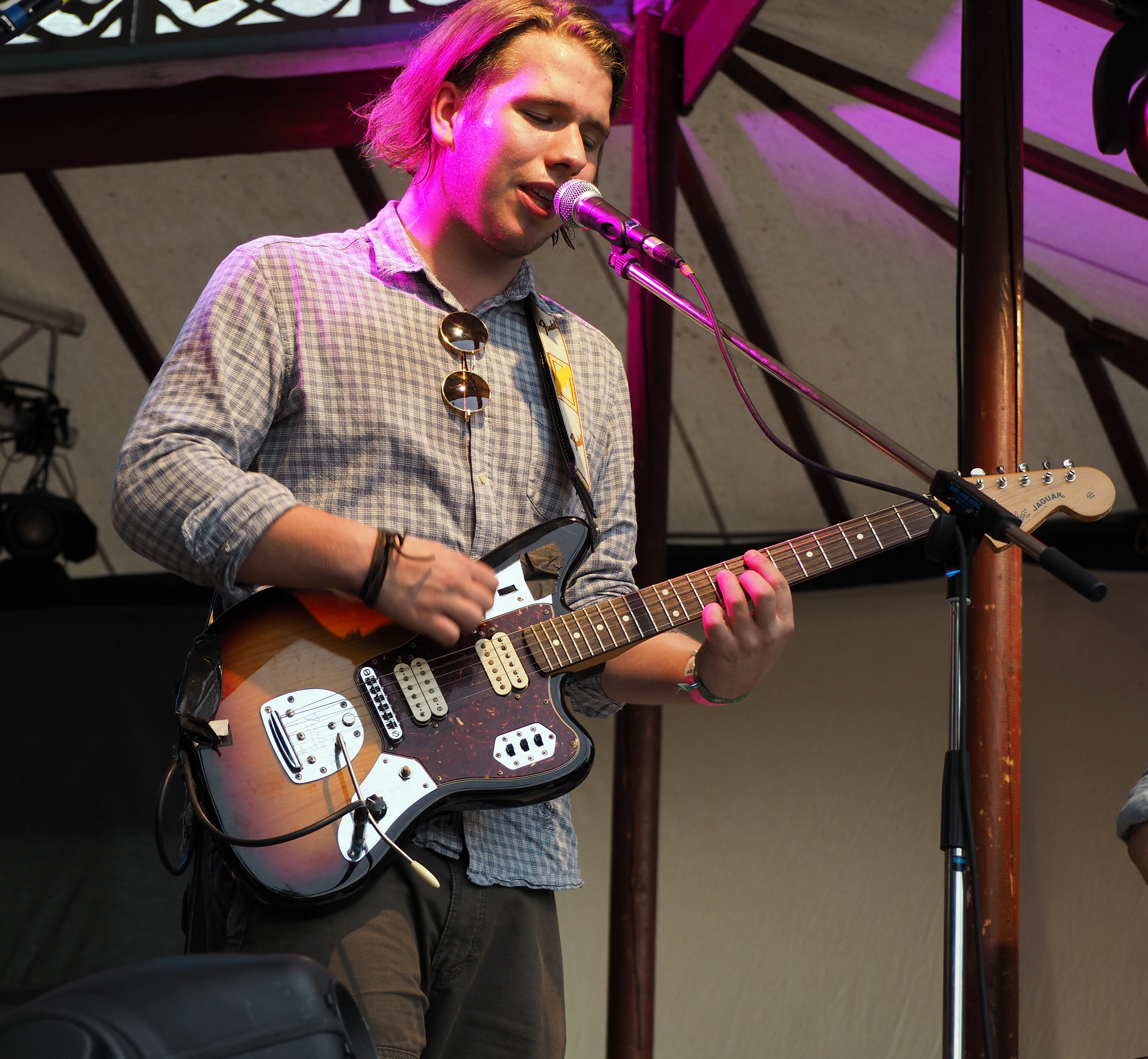
Ben Meyer playing a Fender Jaguar at Sammersee-Festival 2015

Fender reissued the 1962 version of the Jaguar in 1999 as part of its American Vintage Reissue (AVRI) Series (lower cost Japanese-made versions were available between 1984 and 2015, originally made of basswood and then alder like their American counterparts). Several other variations have been released within the last decade, including several humbucker versions and a Jaguar bass guitar in 2006. Fender Japan produced Jaguars for its own domestic market with numerous special editions including an accurate version of Kurt Cobain's modified model until Fender chose to end the licensing agreement in place since the early 1980s in favor of taking over Japanese production themselves in 2015. There are notable differences between the typical Japanese models and their American counterparts. One of the more notable examples would be the electronics: Japanese production models typically used cheaper wiring, miniature pots throughout the guitar (as opposed to only in the rhythm circuit as would be found on original and AVRI examples), lower-quality pickups, and shielding paint as opposed to brass shielding plates installed in the cavities (Japanese guitars made before 96/97 also have brass shielding) seen on typical American Jaguars. Original and AVRI variants have nitrocellulose lacquer finishes, while Japanese versions would typically be finished in polyester, though there are rare Japanese examples with nitrocellulose finishes as well. US-produced AVRI Jaguars often did not sport matching headstocks, unlike their vintage counterparts, however, many Japanese models do, and also offer some custom colors not found as easily on American models.

In the late 2000s, Fender began to offer limited editions of the AVRI models from a few of their more-popular retailers, with these specific variants being referred to as the Thin Skin series. A collaboration between several notable American guitar retailers (Such as Dave's Guitar Shop in Wisconsin and Wildwood Guitars in Colorado) culminated in the release of otherwise typical AVRI Jaguars as well as Jazzmasters, Telecasters, and Stratocasters, but in more sought-after Classic finishes that Fender otherwise had little interest in releasing themselves. These were almost identical to the production AVRI models, with the exception of their finish options and the inclusion of matching headstocks, a 9.5" fretboard radius instead of the vintage-accurate 7.25", and jumbo fretwire. The Thin Skin models used 100% nitrocellulose finishes, a departure from the production models, which used polyurethane undercoats/sealers. These Thin Skin models also featured thinner color and clear coats. These models were available in a number of Custom Colors, and, unlike the standard production '62 Jaguars, these did feature matching headstocks.

In 2012, Fender replaced the entire AVRI line with the American Vintage (AV) Series. The AV Series included more vintage-accurate appointments, such as more accurate decals, thinner cases (as would be found with original 1950s/60s models), a new 'flash' finishing process, updated neck profiles, pickups, tuners, and vintage-reproduction paperwork and manuals. The replacement for the 1962 Jaguar was the 1965 Jaguar. The 1965 Jaguar features a bound rosewood fingerboard with larger pearloid dot inlays, a slightly larger C profile, new, more vintage-accurate pickups, a thinner finish, no amber tint in the clear coat on the neck, and ships with a black tolex case with a red plush interior. Originally offered in Candy Apple Red and Three-Color Sunburst, the Candy Apple Red has since been discontinued. As with the AVRI model, the headstock on the AV '65 in Candy Apple Red did not feature a matching headstock. Fender did offer a limited production run of the '65 Jaguar in Ice Blue Metallic, which did feature a matching headstock.

Fender's Custom Shop also produces various Jaguar models, many of which are reissues/relics. Some of the Custom Shop offerings feature modern appointments (such as radius, pickups, hardware, and finishes).

In 2018, Fender moved on from the AV series and released a new American Original line.. The new take was vintage-accurate features with a modernized 9.5” radius neck. Colors included Three-Color Sunburst, Candy Apple Red and Surf Green. An FSR in Daphne Blue was later added.

Although Fender has many signature Stratocasters and Telecasters designed in conjunction with famous players and the first signature Jazzmasters were introduced in 2007, Kurt Cobain's signature Jaguar was introduced in 2011 (20th anniversary of the release of Nirvana's Nevermind album). In the past, a Kurt Cobain replica Jaguar was made for the Japanese domestic market. The Fender Jag-Stang, a Mustang/Jaguar hybrid, was built for Kurt Cobain based on his design.

In May 2008 Fender introduced the Classic Player Series Jaguar and Jaguar HH with dual Enforcer humbuckers, which are made in Mexico and sold for under $1000. Fender have made numerous changes to the classic design, however, replacing the bridge with a Tune-o-matic type, giving it a 9.5" fretboard radius, moving the vibrato unit plate closer to the bridge and installing high output pickups. This Classic Player guitar is also available as a "1966" limited-edition version with a bound neck featuring rectangular block inlays and CBS-style decals as of 2009.

In September 2010 the Black Top Jaguar HH was introduced as part of the Mexico-made Black Top series. Features include a solid alder body with gloss polyester finish, chrome hardware, dual Hot Vintage AlNiCo humbucking pickups with chrome metal covers and black skirted amp knobs. Other refinements include a maple neck with a 9.5"-radius rosewood fingerboard, 22 medium-jumbo frets, 24"-scale length, a stop tailpiece and a three-way toggle switch.

== Features ==
The Jaguar was built from ideas first incorporated in the Jazzmaster, with a similar "offset waist" body and vibrato unit. Unlike the Jazzmaster, the Jaguar was fitted with a shorter 24-inch scale, 22-fret neck and featured smaller single-coil pickups with notched side plates that improved RF shielding, making the Jaguar less prone to interference than the more popular Stratocaster and Telecaster.

The Jaguar and the Jazzmaster also shared a dual-circuit setup, one circuit for lead and another for rhythm, each with separate controls, allowing for two preset tone and volume settings between which the guitarist could rapidly switch. The Jaguar, however, had a more complex lead circuit consisting of three switches and two dials on the lower bout: the first two switches were on/off switches for the neck and bridge pickups, respectively, while the third switch engaged a capacitor that served as a high-pass filter (sometimes referred to as a "strangle" switch). The rhythm circuit, set into operation when the upper bout switch is flicked upwards, had individual volume and tone rollers but no option to choose between pickups. This rhythm circuit has a bassier, neck-pickup only range.

Another new feature was a spring-loaded rubber string mute, which was flipped upwards from under the strings by a lever. The mute was designed for guitarists who had to palm mute for extended periods, which was difficult or impossible on the Jaguar's floating bridge without knocking the bridge out of position. This feature proved unpopular and became known as a "tone killer"; the cover and its foam were usually quickly removed.

The bridge on many versions of the Jaguar has become known for several design shortcomings and consequent problems. The "threaded" bridge saddles allow the strings to slip out of alignment if they are plucked or strummed hard, motivating some players to fit replacement saddles that have deeper slots or grooves to hold the strings, or to replace the bridge completely. The Fender Mustang style bridge is a popular choice of replacement. Another issue sometimes encountered is a tendency for the bridge's support posts to slip down into the holes that house them. Some people have use strategies inconsistent with the original intended physics to stop the bridge from rocking as it was designed to do, including wrapping tape around the bridge posts. Like the Jazzmaster and Bass VI, the Jaguar has an unusual floating vibrato mechanism that was a complete departure from the "synchronized vibrato" system found on the Stratocaster. Leo Fender believed that this new design was superior to previous designs since the bridge actually moved backwards and forwards along with the strings during vibrato use, thereby maintaining proper intonation even under duress, and preventing strings from binding. This floating bridge concept was also later used on the Fender Mustang. The floating vibrato mechanism also features a built-in lock, which helped the player preserve the guitar's tuning in the event of a string breakage and easing removal of the vibrato arm.

== Variations ==
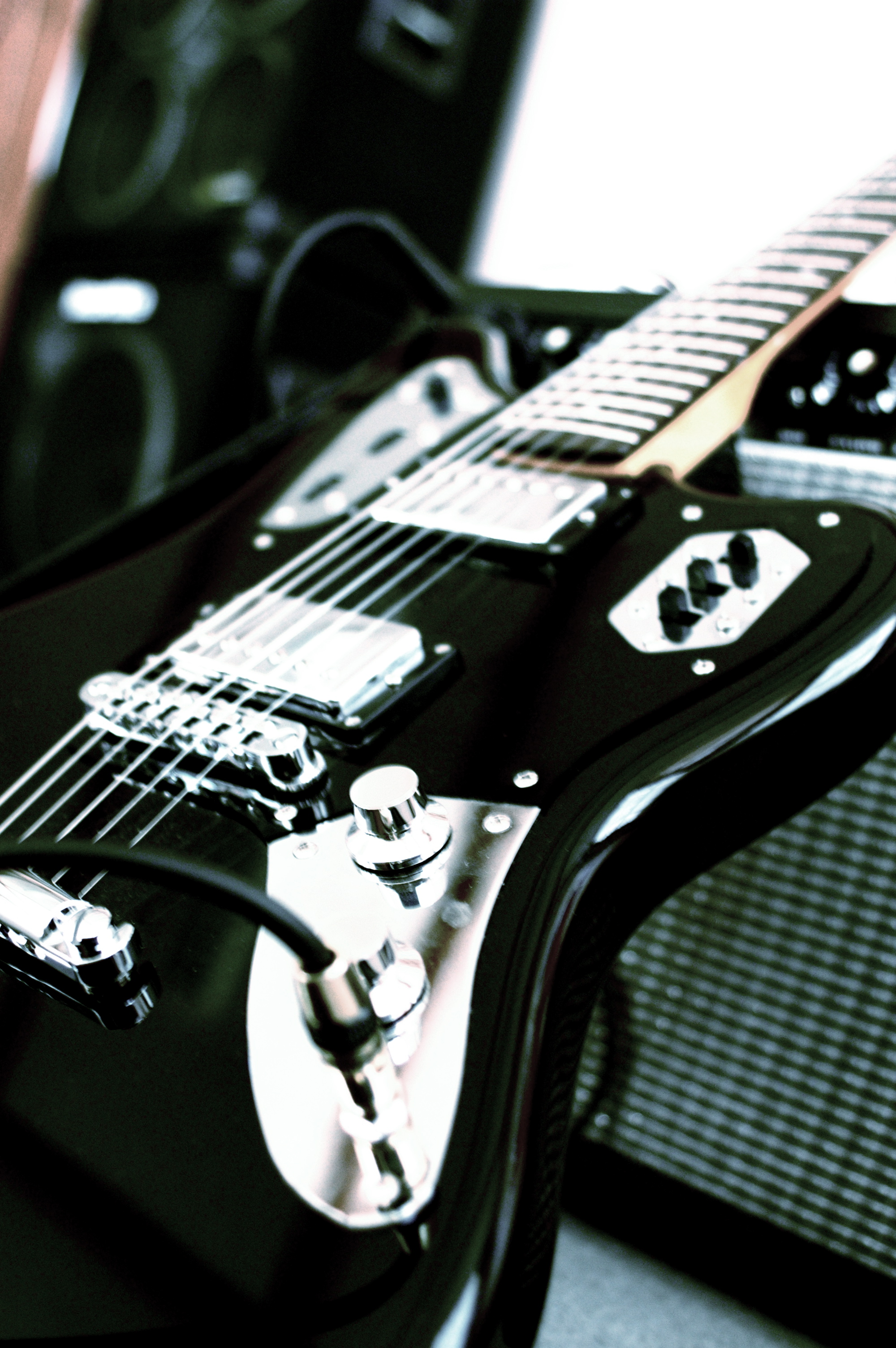

Fender Jaguar Special HH

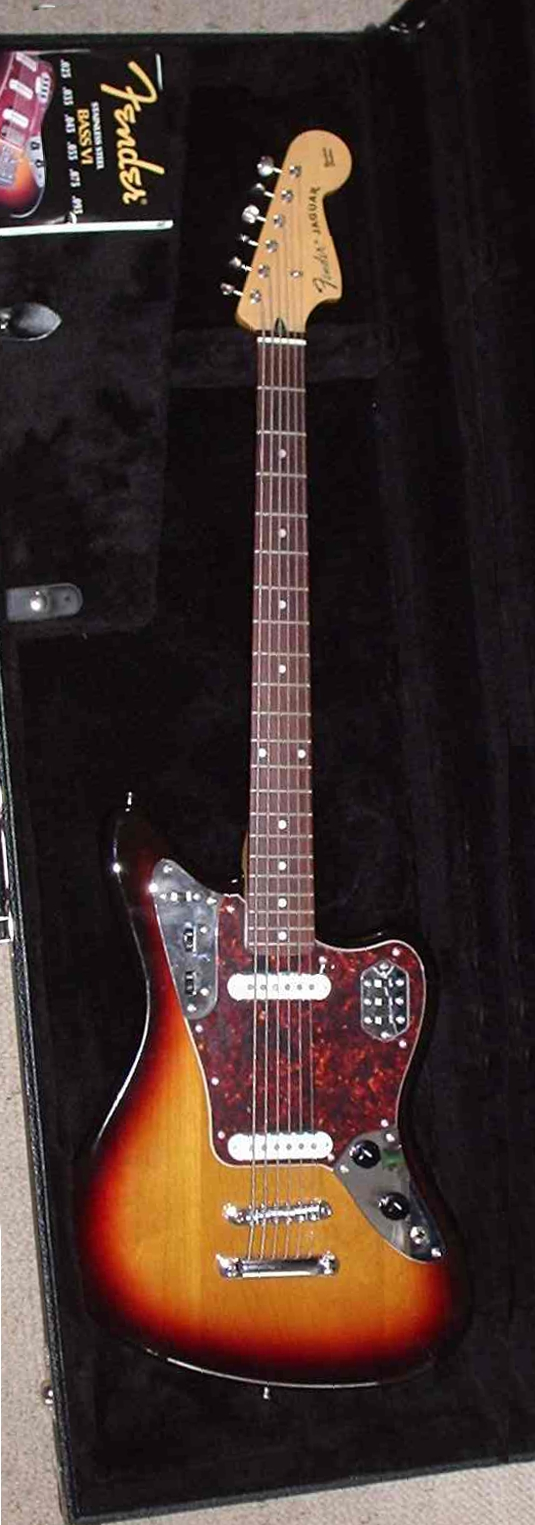
Fender Jaguar Baritone Custom

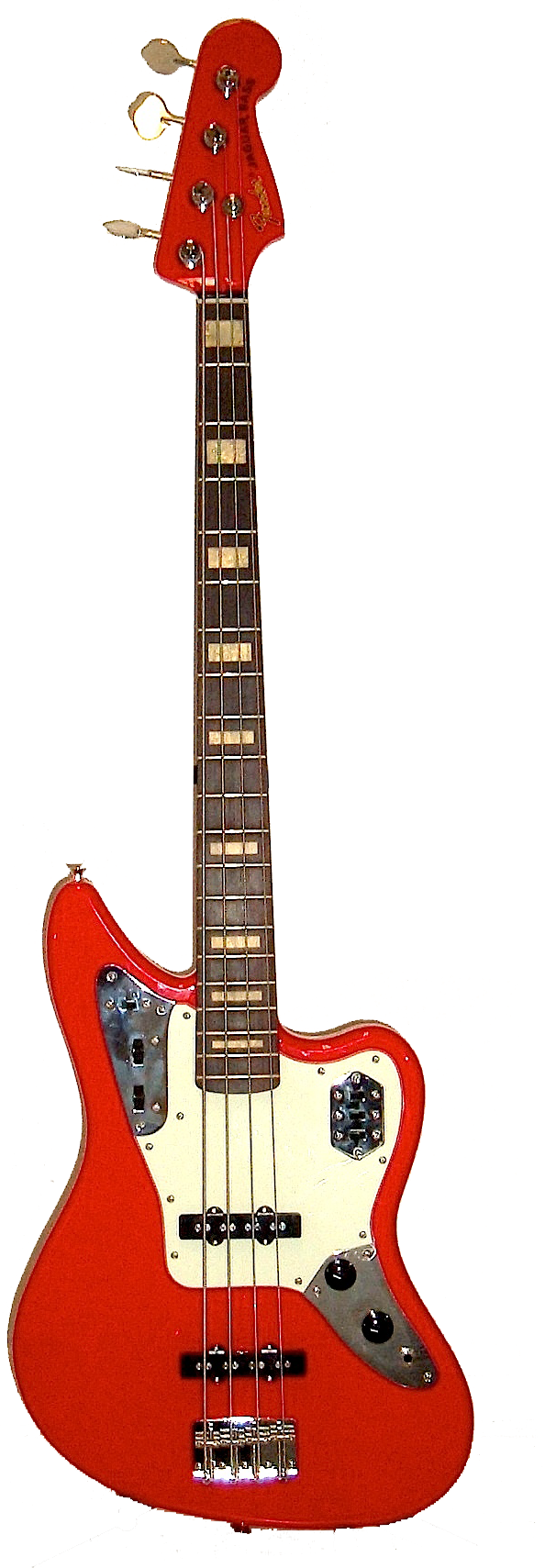

Fender Jaguar Bass

Fender 50th Anniversary Jaguar

To celebrate the 50th anniversary of the Jaguar in 2012, Fender released a USA-made model that featured a C-shaped maple neck with lacquer finish and vintage-style truss rod, bound 9.5"-radius rosewood fingerboard with 22 medium jumbo frets and pearloid block inlays, a modified one-degree neck-angle-pocket cut to improve pitch, a re-positioned tremolo plate to increase bridge break angle to prevent string slippage and increased sustain, a custom neckplate and specially designed hotter wound single-coil neck and bridge pickups for fatter tone and more output. The 50th Anniversary Jaguar was available in three Custom Colors: Burgundy Mist Metallic, Candy Apple Red, and Lake Placid Blue. The first 100 of each color were hand-numbered.

Fender Blacktop

A Jaguar with high-output humbuckers, alder body, maple neck with rosewood fretboard, 9,5" radius, T.O.M./STP style bridge, volume and tone pots and a three-way Gibson style pickup switch.

Fender Blacktop Jaguar FSR with Neck Binding

Similar to the regular Blacktop Jaguar with high-output humbuckers, alder body, maple neck with rosewood fretboard, 9,5" radius, T.O.M./STP style bridge, volume and tone pots and a three-way Gibson style pickup switch. This model was manufactured for Guitar Center as a Fender Special Run and came in Blizzard Pearl or Metallic Surf Green. The Blizzard Pearl model featured white neck binding, while the Metallic Surf Green featured mint colored neck binding. The other difference between this and the regular Blacktop models was the presence of flathead screw adjustable Tune-o-matic posts and regular Jaguar knobs.

Fender Jaguar Special HH

Has the same body shape as the standard Jaguar, but is equipped with two low-output Fender designed Dragster humbucking pickups, a fixed Adjust-o-matic bridge (similar to a Gibson Tune-o-matic), a 24" scale length, and chrome knobs. It is made in Japan.

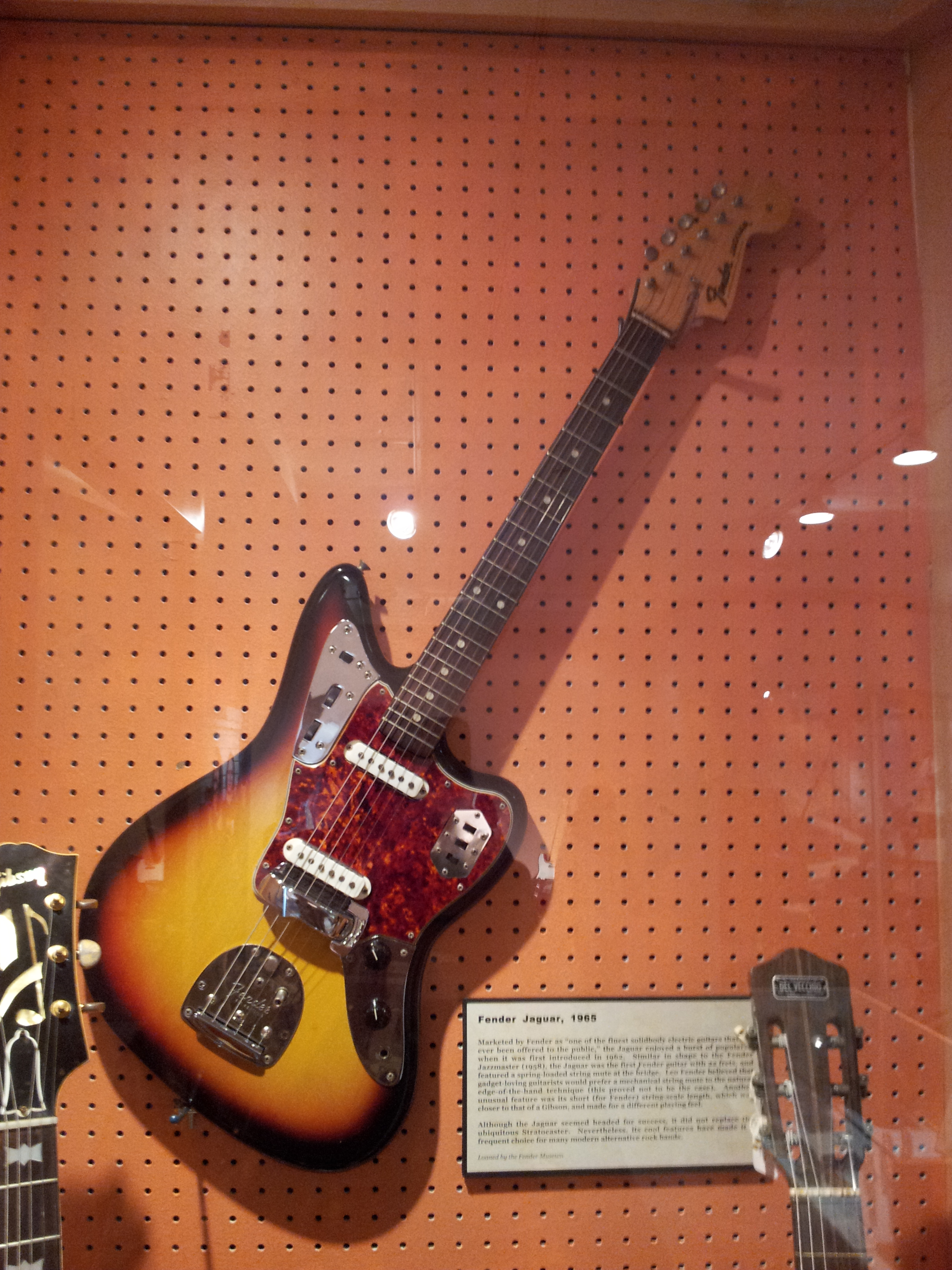
Fender Jaguar (1965) with bridge cover and mute installed

Fender Jaguar Classic Player Special

This guitar is similar to the Fender Jaguar Special HH, only it has single coil hot rod Fender Jaguar pickups as opposed to the humbuckers on the HH. It is equipped with chrome hardware, and vintage-style vibrato arm that is threaded as opposed to the original non-threaded tremolo, and it has same controls as the bolt-on neck and has plastic control knobs. This guitar is made in Mexico and comes in Candy Apple red and three-color sunburst.

Fender Jaguar Baritone Special HH

Similar to the Jaguar HH, except that it has fewer switching options, and a longer 27" scale length (as opposed to the normal 24"), and is designed to be tuned a fourth below a standard guitar (B E A D F# B, low to high). This guitar is only available in black with a matching black headstock and chrome hardware to emphasise its unique design.

Fender Classic Player Jaguar Special HH

A Jaguar modeled after the guitars of players such as Kurt Cobain. This Jaguar has two Fender Enforcer humbuckers which are able to be coil-tapped, a Gibson-style "Tune-O-Matic" bridge, and the vibrato-bar tailpiece has been moved closer to the bridge. It is made in Mexico.

Fender Jaguar Baritone Custom

A MIJ combination of a Jaguar and a Fender Bass VI with additional features. It has a fixed bridge, a 28.5" scale length and heavier strings (the same set as the slightly longer Bass VI) to achieve an E–E tuning one octave lower than a standard guitar. Renamed the Fender Jaguar Bass VI Custom (some Fender catalogues omit the word Jaguar) a few months before it was discontinued.

Fender Jaguar Bass

Essentially a Fender Jazz Bass with a Jaguar-shaped body and Jaguar-styled switching options. Features a switchable onboard preamp with bass/treble controls. The American version has the chrome plates that the design is known for whereas the Made in Mexico version replaces these with a plastic pickguard.

Squier Vintage Modified Jaguar

In 2012, Squier released the Vintage Modified Jaguar, Crafted in Indonesia. It was available in 3-Tone Sunburst, Olympic White, Candy Apple Red and Surf Green, all came with tortoise shell guard except CAR which came with white. It was fairly accurate to vintage Jaguar specs and had Duncan Designed Jaguar pickups with vintage style Jaguar rhythm circuit and controls, 9.5" radius, 22 fret rosewood neck (until 2018 Indian Laurel) with dot inlays, and Jaguar bridge. The Vintage Modified Jaguar was discontinued in 2019 along with the discontinuation of the Vintage Modified series, and replaced by the Classic Vibe series 70's Jaguar.

Fender Kurt Cobain Jaguar

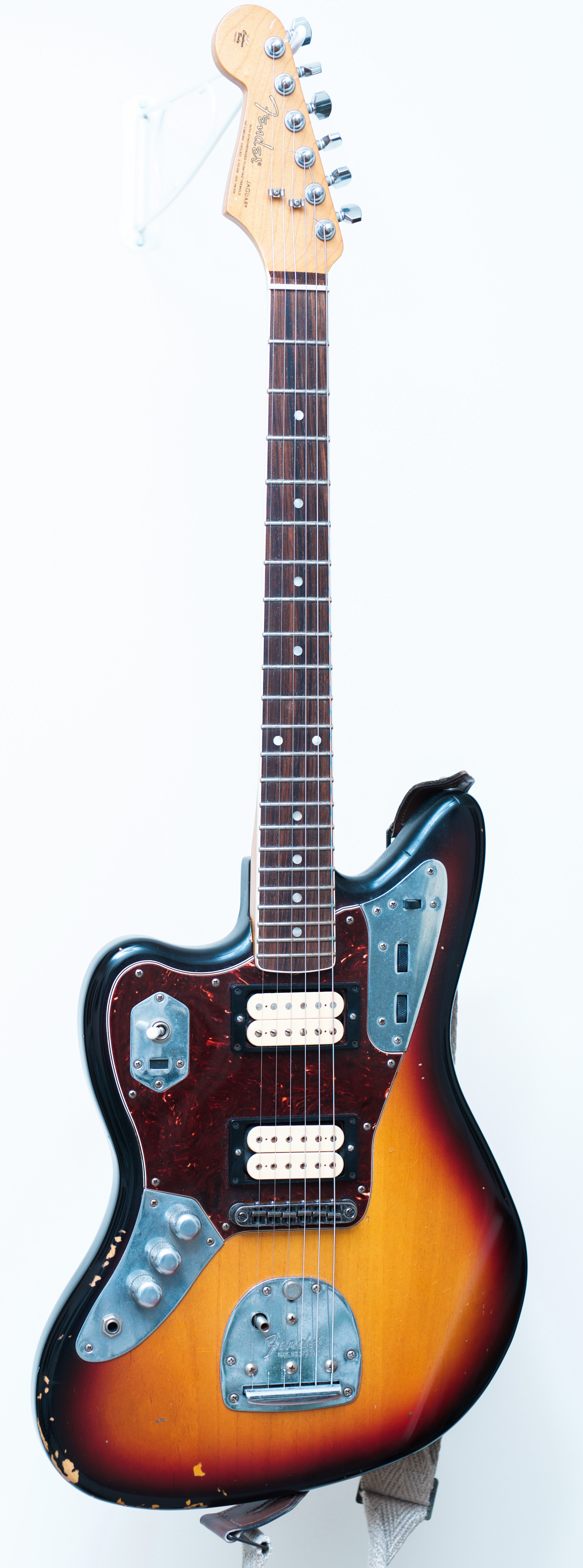
The left handed version of the Fender Kurt Cobain Road Worn Jaguar

A "Made in Mexico" Fender Jaguar model; a replica of the modified 1965 Fender Jaguar used by Kurt Cobain. Equipped with DiMarzio humbuckers, Gotoh tuners, and a Tune-o-matic bridge. It is currently the only Jaguar that is sold left-handed along with right-handed.

Fender Modern Player Jaguar

Basically a stripped-down version with two Fender "MP-90" pickups, two Jazz bass knobs, and a Tune-o-matic bridge. It is crafted in China.

Fender Johnny Marr Signature Jaguar

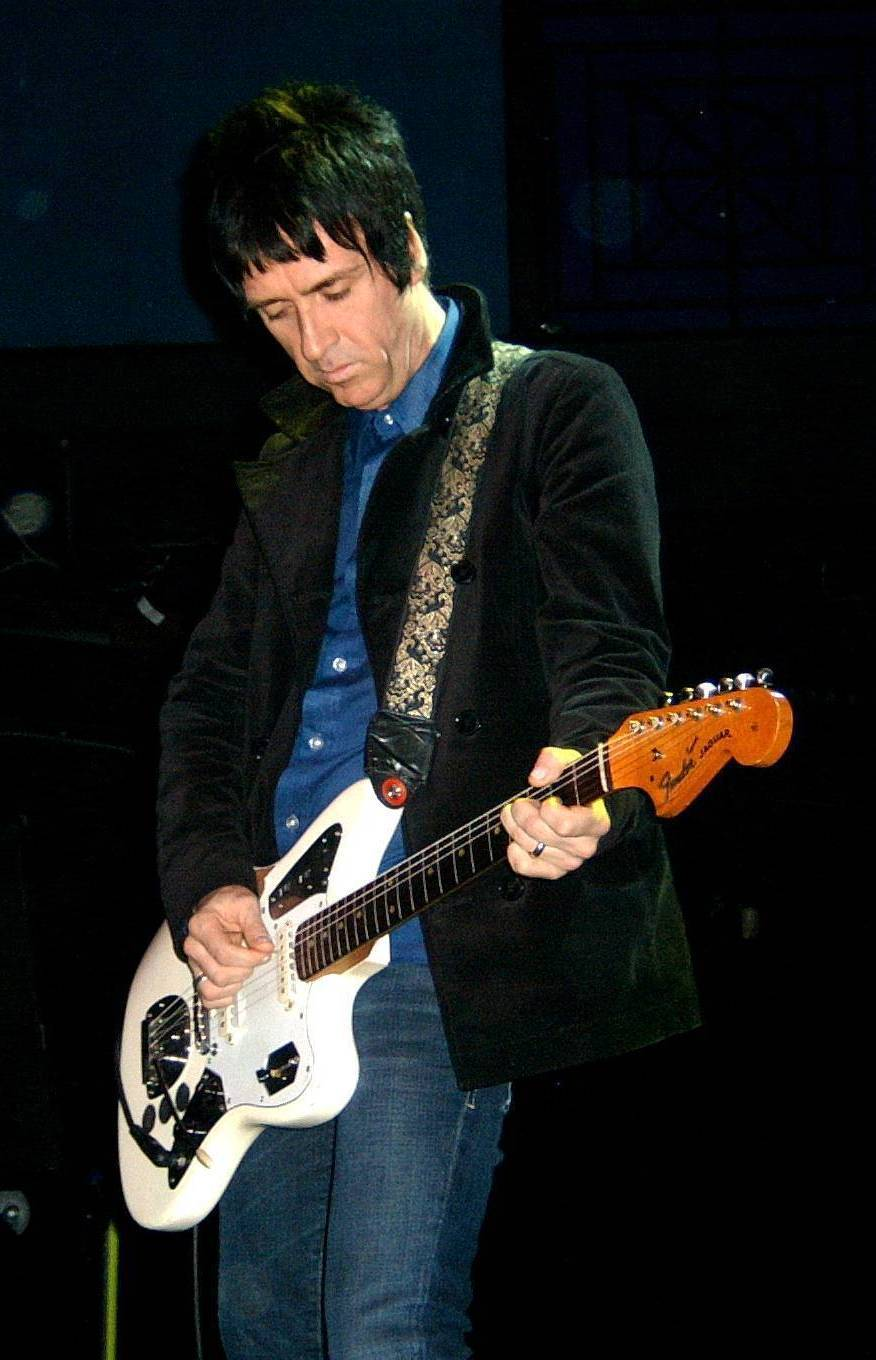
Johnny Marr with The Cribs using his signature Jaguar

US made signature model based on Johnny Marr's favourite vintage guitars plus some modifications to make it a more player-friendly guitar. Specs include four-way pickup selector allowing for standard pickup selecting in addition to choosing to combine both pickups either in series or parallel circuitry, dual strangle switches on the upper control plate, custom Bare Knuckle pickups, body with extra deep belly cut, nitrocellulose finish, custom Fender Mustang saddles in the bridge and a modified "Staytrem" vibrato arm.

Fender Jaguarillo

As part of "Pawn Shop Series" Fender released this hybrid model featuring a traditional Jaguar body with an HSS pickup configuration. All three pickups—two standard Stratocaster® single-coils and an Atomic humbucking bridge pickup—are angled for enhanced bass and treble response. Other unusual touches include one volume knob, one tone knob and a five-way blade pickup switch.

Fender Reverse Jaguar Bass

Also in the "Pawn Shop Series", this model features a reverse body and reverse headstock, a slim, off-center pickguard, and two humbucking pickups. The control layout consisting of a single three-way pickup toggle switch and one volume and one tone.

Special Edition Jaguar Thinline

To celebrate the 50th anniversary of the Jaguar, Fender released a semi-hollow version of the Jaguar, with an Ash top and back and two Vintage-style Jaguar single-coil pickups.

Fender Player Jaguar

This model is part of Fender's Player series that replaces the Mexican Standard series of instruments, and is manufactured in Mexico. The guitar has an alder body, a maple neck and a pau ferro fretboard with a modern 9.5 inch radius. There are two pickups: a single-coil pickup in the neck position and a humbucker in the bridge position. The humbucker has a coil-split option.

Squier Classic Vibe 70's Jaguar

In 2019, Squier released a slightly upgraded version to the discontinued Vintage Modified Jaguar, this time as part of the Classic Vibe series. The Squier Classic Vibe 70's Jaguar has a 9.5" radius, 22 fret Indian Laurel fretboard, Fender designed alnico V Jaguar pickups, classic Jaguar rhythm circuit and pickup switching, including a version of the bass/mid cut "strangle switch", with a fixed radius 9.5" Mustang style bridge, bone nut, tortoise pick guard. It is a throwback to vintage 1970's Jaguar styling with binding on the neck, block inlays and a redesigned 70's inspired Squier Jaguar logo. Finish options include 3-tone Sunburst, Black, Surf Green. FSR finish options were also released in 2020 in Daphne Blue and Shell Pink. Crafted in Indonesia.

Squier Contemporary Jaguar HH ST

In 2021, Squier released this model as part of the Squier Contemporary series, which aims to modernize classic Fender guitars. This model features two Squier SQR Atomic humbuckers, coil-split and series/parallel switching, a roasted maple neck with a 12" radius fretboard, a sculpted neck heel, and an adjustable bridge with a stop tailpiece. The guitar was made available in Sky Burst Metallic, Shoreline Gold, and Lake Placid Blue.

60th Anniversary American Original and American Ultra Luxe Jaguar

In 2022 Fender released two limited edition models to celebrate the Jaguar's 60th anniversary.

The 60th anniversary American Original Jaguar features a bound rosewood fingerboard inlaid with pearloid block position markers and matching painted headstock. This guitar also sports an alder body with nitrocellulose lacquer finish, lead/rhythm circuit, "F" tuners, Jaguar tremolo system with adjustable string mute and comes with an engraved neck plate with a 60th anniversary logo. Available in Mystic Dakota Red and Mystic Lake Placid Blue.

The American Ultra Luxe 60th Anniversary Jaguar boasts a contoured offset select alder body and two custom Double Tap humbucking pickups with 3-way switching and two slide switches for coil-splitting and series/parallel wiring. This guitar deviates from the traditional Jaguar design for the inclusion of a 25.5-inch scale length. Other features include an augmented D-shape maple neck with a 10–14-inch compound radius ebony fingerboard, 22 stainless steel frets, locking all-shortpost tuning machines, TUSQ nut and a string-through Adjust-O-Matic stop tailpiece. Available in Texas Tea.

Fender Japan Moeka Shiotsuka Signature Jaguar

Japanese exclusive model, inspired by Moeka Shiotsuka’s favorite model, The American Vintage ‘65 Jaguar, with every detail catered to her own specifications. The guitar has a C-shaped neck with binding and medium-jumbo frets. While maximizing playability for smaller players the guitar also features two specially developed original pickups that are designed to reproduce the Jaguar’s signature sharp cleans while adding warmth and maintain a clear and defined sound when driven. The guitar features an original color inspired by aged Sonic Blue and butterfly engravings on the tuning peg buttons to symbolize the wish "May the often-snapped 4th string never break.”

== Notable players ==
Among the most influential Jaguar players were Carl Wilson of the Beach Boys, Johnny Marr of the Smiths, and Kurt Cobain of Nirvana. Other prominent players include:

- John Frusciante of the Red Hot Chili Peppers
- Tom Verlaine of Television
- Thurston Moore of Sonic Youth
- Kevin Shields of My Bloody Valentine
- PJ Harvey
- Kurt Vile
- Rowland S. Howard of the Birthday Party, Crime & the City Solution and These Immortal Souls
- Win Butler of Arcade Fire
- Will Sergeant
- The Trashmen
