= Incorruptible (album) =

Studio album by Iced Earth
- Released: June 16, 2017
- Recorded: October 2016 – February 2017
- Studios: Independence Hall, Indiana
- Genres: Power metal; heavy metal; thrash metal
- Length: 54:33
- Label: Century Media
- Producer: Jon Schaffer

Iced Earth chronology
Plagues of Babylon (2014)	Incorruptible (2017)	Bang Your Head (2022)

Incorruptible is the twelfth studio album by American heavy metal band Iced Earth, released on June 16, 2017, by Century Media. It is their only album with lead guitarist Jake Dreyer, and also features a returning Brent Smedley on drums, whose last prior recorded performance with Iced Earth was their 2013 live album "Live in Ancient Kourion". It is their first studio album in over 20 years to entirely not be a concept album (their previous album Plagues of Babylon had half the songs focusing on a concept), with each song instead featuring its own unique stand-alone lyrics. It is also the final Iced Earth album on Century Media and their final album to feature Stu Block on vocals, Luke Appleton on bass, and Smedley on drums, before all members and the label cut ties with Iced Earth founder Jon Schaffer following his arrest for participating in the 2021 United States Capitol attack.

== Overview ==
Iced Earth took a break from touring in 2015, primarily due to Schaffer's second cervical fusion surgery. Longtime Iced Earth drummer Brent Smedley returned to the band for the current recording and touring cycle. On April 7, 2015, following a period of inactivity as a result of Schaffer requiring cervical fusion surgery, the band announced that Iced Earth would begin writing for their 12th studio album, tentatively titled The Judas Goat. In August 2016 lead guitarist Troy Seele announced his departure from the band citing family reasons. He was replaced on September 25, 2016, by Jake Dreyer. On December 6, Schaffer spoke with Fernando Bonenfant from Metal Wani and announced that the new album would be called Incorruptible, originally due in May.

On March 13, 2017, the band confirmed that they had completed work on the album for a mid-June release. On April 6, the artwork was revealed with the album being set for a June 16 release.

Regarding how Incorruptible compares to previous Iced Earth albums, guitarist and main songwriter Jon Schaffer said: "They're all kind of their own thing, but I have a very strong gut feeling about this, and so does everybody in the band, that this is one of the really special ones. So I put it up there with The Dark Saga [1996], Something Wicked This Way Comes [1998], Dystopia [2011] — it's in that league of records — so it's really gonna be something special, man. I know musicians always say that, but there is something going on here, so it's cool. We're all very excited about it." On the topic of the concept for the lyrics on Incorruptible, Schaffer said: "There is no concept on this record; it's just ten individual tracks not related to each other. Actually, on Plagues Of Babylon [2014], it was only the first six that were related to the 'Something Wicked' story; it was like a zombie apocalypse within the 'Something Wicked' framework. But this album, it's just ten individual songs. We have one called 'Clear The Way', which is about the Irish Brigade at the Battle of Fredericksburg — very tragic, actually — but that's a big epic, like ten minutes; and then we have one called 'Black Flag', which is a pirate song. It's quite a… I think I pulled it off pretty well with the lyrics, to be able to tell such a big story in a very short amount of time. I think it's gonna be a highlight of the record. And then on [the last European] tour, [we opened] the show with a new song that will be the opener on the album — it's called 'Great Heathen Army' — that's got a Viking kind of a vibe to it. So there's a lot of different things, and none of it's really related. There's one called 'Raven Wing'… I can't really think of all of them right now… 'Seven Headed Whore' — that's one that's actually pretty brutal; it's like a total kick in the balls. But, you know, there's a lot of varied emotions on this, and it's cool stuff, man."

Asked about singer Stu Block's contribution to Incorruptible, Schaffer said: "Well, he came at the end of… for about the last month or so of pre-production… maybe a little bit more… five weeks… and we worked on his vocal parts. We do it like Stu and I normally do it. Some of the stuff we write together. I mean, I write the musical arrangements and do all that — he doesn't play any instruments — but he comes in… At the end of the writing process is when we focus on his parts. And the lyrics that we worked on together, on a song called 'Brothers', which is about our brotherhood, [between] Stu and I and within the band… We've gone through a lot of shit together and we've had a lot of great times together, but the bond is very strong, and that's clear. So it's just a song, really, for us. And then he wrote the lyrics for 'The Great Heathen Army'. I'm trying to think… I can't think of 'em, man; I have to look at the list [of songs]. But usually, he goes to an area and works, and I go in my area and work. And, like I said, on some songs we collaborate sometimes. On this one, the only we did was 'Brothers'… We work in the way we always work. And it's a very cool chemistry."

The first song released was "Seven Headed Whore" on April 28 followed by "Raven Wing" on April 29, the album's opening track "Great Heathen Army" on May 19, and finally "Clear the Way (December 13th, 1862)" on June 13.

== Artwork ==
The cover artwork for the disc (as well as additional illustrations to every song) was created by David Newman-Stump from Skeleton Crew Tattoo, M. Rokib (Jeje) from Kriegsmachine Studio(pencil illustrations) and Roy Young (colors).

== Reception ==
Loudwire states Incorruptible has moments of greatness that hearken back to the band's '90s glory days, but also a few underwhelming moments. Incorruptible sold 5,675 copies in the first week of its release in the United States. Sales were slightly lower than their 2014 release, Plagues of Babylon. However, the album debuted higher at #42. The album won a 2017 Metal Storm Award for Best Power Metal Album.

== Track listing ==
No.	Title	Lyrics	Music	Length
1.	"Great Heathen Army"	Stu Block	Jon Schaffer	5:21
2.	"Black Flag"	Schaffer	Luke Appleton; Schaffer	4:56
3.	"Raven Wing"	Schaffer	Schaffer	6:25
4.	"The Veil"	Schaffer	Schaffer	4:47
5.	"Seven Headed Whore"	Schaffer	Schaffer	3:00
6.	"The Relic (Part 1)"	Block	Schaffer	4:59
7.	"Ghost Dance (Awaken the Ancestors)"	(Instrumental)	Schaffer	6:35
8.	"Brothers"	Block; Schaffer	Block; Schaffer	4:54
9.	"Defiance"	Block	Appleton; Schaffer	4:08
10.	"Clear the Way (December 13, 1862)"	Schaffer	Schaffer	9:30
Total length:				54:33

== Personnel ==
- Jon Schaffer – rhythm guitar, acoustic guitar, backing vocals
- Stu Block – lead vocals, backing vocals
- Luke Appleton – bass
- Brent Smedley – drums
- Jake Dreyer – lead guitar

== Charts ==
Chart (2017)	Peak position
Austrian Albums (Ö3 Austria)	18
Belgian Albums (Ultratop Flanders)	29
Belgian Albums (Ultratop Wallonia)	64
Canadian Albums (Billboard)	67
Czech Albums (ČNS IFPI)	40
Finnish Albums (Suomen virallinen lista)	47
French Albums (SNEP)	146
German Albums (Offizielle Top 100)	15
Scottish Albums (Official Charts)	97
Spanish Albums (PROMUSICAE)	91
Swiss Albums (Schweizer Hitparade)	17
US Billboard 200	140
