= The Crucible of Man: Something Wicked Part 2 =

Studio album by Iced Earth
- Released: September 8, 2008
- Recorded: February – April 2007; March – May 2008
- Studios: Soaring Eagle Sound, Nashville, Indiana
- Genres: Power metal; heavy metal; thrash metal
- Length: 59:09; 72:12 (Japanese edition)
- Label: SPV
- Producers: Jim Morris; Jon Schaffer

Iced Earth chronology
Framing Armageddon: Something Wicked Part 1 (2007)	The Crucible of Man: Something Wicked Part 2 (2008)	Dystopia (2011)

Professional ratings
Review scores
Source	Rating
AllMusic	3.5/5 stars
Jukebox:Metal	3/5 stars
Metal Storm	(7.3/10)
Sputnikmusic	1.5/5 stars

The Crucible of Man: Something Wicked Part 2 is the ninth studio album by American heavy metal band Iced Earth. Released in September 2008, it was the first Iced Earth album since 2001's Horror Show to feature singer Matt Barlow. The Crucible of Man is the second concept album based on guitarist-songwriter Jon Schaffer's Something Wicked Saga. It also the third album overall to feature the subject.

Originally titled Revelation Abomination: Something Wicked Part 2, the majority of The Crucible of Man had been written and recorded at the same time as the group's previous album, Framing Armageddon. Crucible had been intended for an early 2008 release; however, Matt Barlow rejoined Iced Earth in late 2007, and work on the album had to be put-off due to Barlow's prior commitments to the band Pyramaze.

The Crucible of Man: Something Wicked Part 2 was released on September 5, 2008, in Germany, Austria and Switzerland, on September 8 in rest of Europe, and on September 9 in North America. The album ended-up being the last Iced Earth studio album to feature bassist Dennis Hayes, as well as vocalist Matt Barlow, who once again left the band in August 2011.

== Story ==
The album's story picks-up where the previous album, Framing Armageddon: Something Wicked Part 1, left off. In an interview with Jon Schaffer, he detailed the story of Part 2:

Ten thousand years pass and then the saviour is born named Set. He's born six months before Christ and he is personally responsible for the crucifixion of Christ and for this new religion called Christianity. But the whole point is, part one deals with the period from the invasion up until right before Set's birth. And then part two takes it from his birth, like in 'Behold The Wicked Child,' to his youth when the minions are telling him what he is and what he has become, to the struggles that he has with that and how he finally comes to accept what he is. Then he goes through the trials and how he takes the crown and he finally accepts that he is basically the antichrist to mankind but he's the saviour of his own race of beings. This thing doesn't really end because the whole 'Something Wicked' -universe is really much bigger than a couple of Iced Earth albums. The way I chose to end the record is that it just comes up to modern day. And so we've got 2000 years of Set's life on part two. It's up now till modern day and the only way that the human beings can live through this is if we actually, truly evolve as species. Which means that we would truly have to start being honest. And that's the problem with mankind. It's never going to happen and they are using that, it's the whole weapon against us. Like in 'Come What May' there's a lyric from living in caves till man flies in space, we've done all these great things but the nature of mankind has not evolved at all.

—

== Track listing ==
No.	Title	Lyrics	Music	Length
1.	"In Sacred Flames"	Jon Schaffer	Schaffer	1:29
2.	"Behold the Wicked Child"	Schaffer	Schaffer	5:38
3.	"Minions of the Watch"	Matt Barlow	Schaffer	2:06
4.	"The Revealing"	Schaffer	Schaffer	2:40
5.	"A Gift or a Curse?"	Schaffer	Jim Morris; Schaffer	5:34
6.	"Crown of the Fallen"	Schaffer	Schaffer	2:49
7.	"The Dimension Gauntlet"	Schaffer	Schaffer	3:12
8.	"I Walk Alone"	Schaffer	Tim Mills; Schaffer	4:00
9.	"Harbinger of Fate"	Schaffer	Schaffer	4:43
10.	"Crucify the King"	Barlow	Schaffer	5:36
11.	"Sacrificial Kingdoms"	Barlow	Schaffer	3:58
12.	"Something Wicked (Part 3)"	Barlow	Schaffer	4:32
13.	"Divide Devour"	Schaffer	Schaffer	3:15
14.	"Come What May"	Schaffer	Schaffer	7:24
15.	"Epilogue"	(instrumental)	Schaffer	2:21
Total length:				59:09

Japanese bonus tracks
No.	Title	Lyrics	Music	Length
16.	"Setian Massacre" (Matt Barlow Version)	Schaffer	Schaffer	3:44
17.	"The Clouding" (Matt Barlow Version)	Schaffer	Schaffer	9:13
Total length:				72:12

== Personnel ==
Iced Earth

- Matt Barlow – lead vocals
- Jon Schaffer – guitar, bass guitar, keyboards, backing vocals, lead vocals (on track 5). co-producer
- Brent Smedley – drums

Additional musicians

- Corinne Bach – backing vocals
- Jason Blackerby – backing vocals
- Debra Brant – backing vocals
- Jeff Brant – backing vocals
- Dennis Hayes – bass guitar (on tracks 3, 5, 6, 10 and 12)
- Howard Helm – backing vocals
- Kathy Helm – backing vocals
- Jim Morris – backing vocals, guitar (on track 5)
- Tom Morris – backing vocals
- Todd Plant – backing vocals
- Steve Rogowski – cello (on track 15)
- Troy Seele – guitar (tracks 5, 6, 9)

Additional personnel

- Jim Morris – co-producer, engineer, mixer
- Nathan Perry – cover and inner sleeve art
- Felipe Machado Franco – cover and inner sleeve art, layout
- David Newman-Stump – inner sleeve art

== Charts ==
Chart (2008)	Peak position
Hungarian Albums (MAHASZ)	13
