= Dante's Inferno (song) =

2011 song by Iced Earth

Song by Iced Earth

from the album Burnt Offerings
- Released: April 14, 1995
- Recorded: 1994
- Studio: Morrisound Recording, Tampa, Florida
- Genre: Thrash metal; power metal; progressive metal
- Length: 16:26
- Label: Century Media
- Songwriter: Jon Schaffer
- Producers: Tom Morris; Jon Schaffer

"Dante's Inferno" is a heavy metal suite written by Jon Schaffer, leader of the American heavy metal band Iced Earth. The song was originally released on the group's 1995 album Burnt Offerings, and was re-recorded in 2011, with a different line-up and Schaffer as the only remaining member from the original line-up.

"Dante's Inferno" is also the longest song the band has ever recorded, with the original clocking in at sixteen minutes and twenty-six seconds and the re-recorded version clocking in at seventeen minutes and twenty-eight seconds.

== Lyrics ==
The song is based on the Inferno segment of Dante Alighieri's Divine Comedy. In it, Dante travels through the nine circles of Hell, guided by the Roman poet Virgil. The circles are concentric, representing a gradual increase in wickedness, and culminating at the centre of the earth, where Satan is held in bondage. Each circle's sinners are punished in a fashion fitting their crimes: each sinner is afflicted for all of eternity by the chief sin they committed.

== Live ==
After its release in 1995, the song was only performed live in 1999, for the Alive in Athens concert. Schaffer later shed light on why the song was only played at said concert:

"The simple reason why we haven’t [played the song] is because the original click track was erased, therefore requiring a keyboard player to do the parts live. That's OK for a special event like when we recorded Alive in Athens, but to hire a keyboard player for a full tour, for one song, just isn't financially feasible."

After Iced Earth re-recorded "Dante's Inferno" in 2011, they announced that the song would be played on all dates of the Dystopia World Tour. According to Jon Schaffer, it may be the last tour on which the song will be performed.

== 2011 version ==
"Dante's Inferno 2011"

Single by Iced Earth
- B-side: "Dante's Inferno" (Raw version)
- Released: September 5, 2011
- Recorded: July and August 2011; at Morrisound Recording, Tampa, Florida
- Length: 17:28
- Songwriter: Jon Schaffer
- Producers: Jim Morris; Jon Schaffer

Iced Earth singles chronology
| "I Walk Among You" (2008) | "Dante's Inferno 2011" (2011) |

In 2011, Iced Earth re-recorded "Dante's Inferno" with the line-up of rhythm guitarist Jon Schaffer (who also played on the original recording), lead guitarist Troy Seele, bassist Freddie Vidales, drummer Brent Smedley and singer Stu Block. Stu Block had just joined Iced Earth earlier that year, and according to Schaffer, the band had already planned to re-record "Dante's Inferno" prior to the leaving of previous vocalist Matt Barlow (who also sang on the original "Dante's Inferno"). The re-recorded "Dante's Inferno", re-named "Dante's Inferno 2011", was given away for free on the band's official website on September 5, 2011.

Now that the band had re-recorded the song, they were in possession of a new click track, which meant that they no longer required a keyboard player to play the song live. As a result, "Dante's Inferno" was brought back in to Iced Earth's setlist for their Dystopia World Tour and included in their 2013 live album Live in Ancient Kourion. A CD version of the song was also sold on the tour.

== Personnel ==
=== 1995 ===
- Jon Schaffer − rhythm guitar, backing vocals
- Matt Barlow − lead vocals
- Randall Shawver − lead guitar
- Dave Abell − bass
- Rodney Beasley − drums

Guest musicians

- Howard Helm – keyboards

=== 2011 ===
- Jon Schaffer – rhythm guitar, lead guitar, acoustic guitar, backing vocals
- Stu Block – lead vocals
- Troy Seele – lead guitar
- Freddie Vidales – bass, backing vocals
- Brent Smedley – drums

Guest musicians

- Jim Morris – backing vocals
- Tom Morris – backing vocals
- Howard Helm – keyboards, backing vocals
