= I Walk Among You =

Single by Iced Earth
- Released: June 13, 2008
- Recorded: Music: February–April 2007; Vocals: March 13 and 14, 2008
- Label: SPV
- Songwriters: Jon Schaffer; Tim Mills
- Producers: Jim Morris; Jon Schaffer

Iced Earth singles chronology
"Setian Massacre" (2007)	"I Walk Among You" (2008)	"Dante's Inferno 2011" (2011)

Professional ratings
Review scores
Source	Rating
Metal.de	4/10
Metal Hammer	2/7

I Walk Among You is a single by the American heavy metal band Iced Earth. Released on June 13, 2008, the single marked the return of long-time vocalist Matt Barlow, who originally left the band in 2003, but later returned in 2007.

I Walk Among You features four songs. A new song titled "I Walk Alone" (which was later included on the band's next full-length album The Crucible of Man) as well as three previously released songs re-sung by Barlow, all of which have also been remixed and re-mastered. One of the previously released songs, "A Charge to Keep", was initially released exclusively through the iTunes version of the single, although it later appeared on the Box of the Wicked compilation some time later.

A music video was also planned for the track "I Walk Alone", but due to some unknown issues with record company SPV, the plan never materialized. According to rhythm guitarist Jon Schaffer, the video was going to feature Set Abominae (the central figure of Schaffer's Something Wicked Saga, of which "I Walk Alone" is a part of) in an inter-dimensional world.

"I Walk Among You" peaked at number 74 on the French single chart.

== Critical reception ==
Metal.de said Barlow shines on "I Walk Alone" but otherwise it doesn't have any new ideas and the riffing is unconvincing. Barlow's vocals on "The Clouding" were said to be much better than Owen's. Overall, the release was noted as lackluster since it only has one new song. Vampster stated that "I Walk Alone" is an average song compared to already underwhelming material on Framing Armageddon. Barlow's vocals was said to have no improvement on "Setian Massacre". The beginning of "The Clouding" was noted to have improved with Barlow's more emotional voice. Powermetal.de said "I Walk Alone" sounds too average to rank among Iced Earth's classics. They like the two other songs a bit more than the original versions. In conclusion, the single was said to be only of interest to Iced Earth fans. Rock Hard stated that although Owen performed excellently, Barlow's warmer vocal tone is better suited to more melancholic Iced Earth songs. AllMusic noted "I Walk Alone" as "ferocious".

== Track listing ==
No.	Title	Lyrics	Music	Length
1.	"I Walk Alone"	Jon Schaffer	Tim Mills; Schaffer	4:00
2.	"Setian Massacre"	Schaffer	Schaffer	3:44
3.	"The Clouding"	Schaffer	Schaffer	9:13
Total length:				16:57

iTunes Store bonus track
No.	Title	Lyrics	Music	Length
4.	"A Charge to Keep"	Schaffer	Schaffer	4:25
Total length:				21:21

== Personnel ==
Iced Earth

- Jon Schaffer – rhythm guitar, lead guitar, bass, backing vocals, co-producer
- Matt Barlow – lead vocals
- Troy Seele – lead guitar
- Brent Smedley – drums

Guest musicians

- Dennis Hayes – bass (on "The Clouding")

Other personnel

- Jim Morris – co-producer, engineer
- Nathan Perry – cover and inner sleeve art
- Felipe Machado Franco – cover and inner sleeve art, layout
- David Newman-Stump – inner sleeve art
