= Dead or Dreaming =

Studio album by Into Eternity
- Released: December 2, 2001
- Recorded: January to July 2001
- Studio: Touchwood Studios, Regina, SK, Canada
- Genre: Progressive metal, melodic death metal
- Length: 44:18
- Label: DVS
- Producer: Into Eternity

Into Eternity chronology
Into Eternity (1999)	Dead or Dreaming (2001)	Buried in Oblivion (2004)

Professional ratings
Review scores
Source	Rating
Allmusic	4/5 stars
Sputnikmusic	4/5 stars

Dead or Dreaming is the second full-length studio album by Canadian progressive death metal band Into Eternity. It was released by DVS Records in 2001 and re-released by Century Media Records on 2002.

== Track listing ==
- All songs written, performed, and arranged by Into Eternity
- All lyrics written by Tim Roth
- All songs: 2001 Into Eternity

No.	Title	Length
1.	"Absolution of the Soul"	3:56
2.	"Distant Pale Future"	5:07
3.	"Shallow"	6:14
4.	"Unholy (Fields of the Dead)"	4:53
5.	"Elysium Dream"	4:38
6.	"Selling God"	3:07
7.	"Imagination Overdose"	3:46
8.	"Dead or Dreaming"	4:17
9.	"Cyber Messiah"	4:29
10.	"Identify"	3:45

== Personnel ==
Credits are adapted from the album's liner notes.

Into Eternity

- Daniel Nargang − lead vocals, guitar
- Jim Austin − drums, death vocals
- Tim Roth − lead vocals, guitar
- Scott Krall − bass, backing vocals

Additional musicians

- Chris McDougall − keyboards
- Amy Ozog − additional vocals on "Elysium Dream", "Selling God" and "Cyber Messiah"

Production and other

- Produced by Into Eternity. Assisted by Kelly Churko, Johny "Six Pack" Gasparic
- Recorded, mixed & mastered – January to July 2001 at Touchwood Studios, Regina, SK, Canada
- Mixed & mastered by Grant Hall. Assisted by Kelly Churko and Into Eternity
- Engineered by Kelly Churko, Johny "Six Pack" Gasparic & Grant Hall
- Keyboards produced, engineered and recorded by Russ Whyte at Whyte Media Publishing
- Artwork & design by Mattias Norén.
- Band photo by Darrol Hofmeister
