= The Scattering of Ashes =

Studio album by Into Eternity
- Released: October 3, 2006
- Recorded: May 15 to June 3, 2006
- Genre: Progressive metal, melodic death metal
- Length: 41:22
- Label: Century Media
- Producer: Grant Hall

Into Eternity chronology
Buried in Oblivion (2004)	The Scattering of Ashes (2006)	The Incurable Tragedy (2008)

Professional ratings
Review scores
Source	Rating
About.com	link
Allmusic	link
Sputnikmusic	link

The Scattering of Ashes is the fourth full-length studio album by Canadian progressive death metal band Into Eternity. It was released on October 3, 2006, by Century Media Records.

It is the first album to feature vocalist Stu Block, and bassist Troy Bleich. In addition, the cover art is the first since their eponymous debut that does not feature the crow prominently depicted on previous albums.

To date, the album has sold over 15,000 copies in the US, and peaked at number 45 on Billboard's Top Independent Albums chart.

Two videos were made for "Severe Emotional Distress", and "Timeless Winter."

== Track listing ==
- All songs written and arranged by Into Eternity except for "Severe Emotional Distress" by Into Eternity and Rob Doherty
- All lyrics by Tim Roth and Stu Block except for "Surrounded By Night" by Tim Roth, Stu Block and Rob Doherty
- All songs 2006 Magic Arts Publishing

No.	Title	Length
1.	"Novus Inceptum"	1:40
2.	"Severe Emotional Distress"	3:55
3.	"Nothing"	3:56
4.	"Timeless Winter"	3:25
5.	"Out"	4:55
6.	"A Past Beyond Memory"	3:38
7.	"Surrounded by Night"	5:08
8.	"Eternal"	3:13
9.	"Pain Through Breathing"	3:52
10.	"Suspension of Disbelief"	4:28
11.	"Paralyzed"	3:11

Japanese edition bonus track
No.	Title	Length
12.	"Timeless Winter (Rough Mix)"	3:25
13.	"Severe Emotional Distress (Rough Mix)"	3:55

On the Japanese edition of The Scattering of Ashes, the length of "Paralyzed" is 3:41 as a 30-second gap of silence is added to the track.

== Personnel ==
Credits are adapted from the album's liner notes.

Into Eternity

- Tim Roth − vocals, guitar
- Troy Bleich − bass, vocals
- Stu Block − vocals
- Jim Austin − drums

Additional musicians

- Collin Craig − 1st guitar solo on "Nothing"

Production and other

- Produced and engineered by Grant Hall and Johnny "Six Pack" Gasparic
- Mixed by Andy Sneap from June 23 to July 5, 2006
- Artwork, logo and layout by Mattias Norén.
- Photography by Cortney Bodnar
