= Into Eternity (band) =

Canadian metal band

- Origin: Regina, Saskatchewan, Canada
- Genres: Melodic death metal; progressive metal
- Years active: 1997−present
- Labels: DVS, Century Media, M-Theory Audio
- Members: Stu Block; Tim Roth; Matt Cuthbertson; Troy Bleich; Bryan Newbury
- Past members: Jim Austin; Steve Bolognese; Rob Doherty; Chris Eisler; Chris Krall; Scott Krall; Christopher McDougall; Daniel Nargang; Justin Bender; Amanda Kiernan
- Website: intoeternity.net

Into Eternity is a Canadian progressive death metal band from Regina, Saskatchewan, formed in 1997 by Tim Roth, Scott Krall and Jim Austin.

== History ==
=== First five albums ===
Tim Roth, Scott Krall, and Jim Austin formed Into Eternity in 1996. They released an eponymous, independent album in 1999, with the additions of Chris Eisler and Chris McDougall. The band signed to Century Media Records a year later and re-released their debut.

In 2001, the band released their second album, Dead or Dreaming, which was a more pronounced integration of progressive and death metal. The trend continued on 2004's Buried in Oblivion and further on 2006's The Scattering of Ashes.

Into Eternity performed on Gigantour 2006, which began in Boise, Idaho, on September 6, 2006. According to Soundscan, The Scattering of Ashes sold a little over 2,000 copies in the US during its first week of release. During the summer of 2007, Into Eternity (along with progressive metal band Redemption) toured in support of Dream Theater during their North American leg of the Chaos in Motion tour. Their new album, The Incurable Tragedy, which is a concept album, was released on August 25, 2008, in Europe and on September 2, 2008, in North America.

=== The Sirens and deaths ===
On March 9, 2011, Into Eternity announced drummer Bryan Newbury. Also in 2011, Stu Block joined Iced Earth.

In February 2012, singer Amanda Kiernan joined the band. In late 2012, Into Eternity began demoing new material with Block and Kiernan.

On May 4, 2012, former guitarist Rob Doherty died at the age of 41. On December 5, 2016, former drummer Adam Sagan died from cancer at the age of 35.

In an interview in late 2013, Tim Roth confirmed that Block was no longer a member and that they would continue with Kiernan as a full-time vocalist. In May 2014, guitarist Justin Bender announced his departure from the band and that Untimely Demise guitarist Matt Cuthbertson would replace him. He confirmed that Into Eternity's then-untitled sixth studio album was in the post-production stage and should be released later in the year. On June 15, 2015, Into Eternity signed a worldwide deal with Italian label Kolony Records. The band planned to release its sixth studio album, The Sirens, in late 2015, but after being delayed for a few years, the album was announced to be released on October 26, 2018. In 2021, following his departure from Iced Earth, Block returned to the band to share vocals with Amanda Kiernan.

== Musical style ==
The band employs a wide range of elements across the metal spectrum, including classic or melodic metal styling, thrashing riffs, neo-classical composition, power metal-style clean vocals, high to low-pitched death growls and black metal shrieking, fast tempoed death metal drumming with blast beats and sometimes interwoven with acoustic guitar playing. Into Eternity provides a sound that is considered to be rather difficult to describe, but the most common description of Into Eternity's music is progressive death metal.

== Band members ==
=== Current ===
- Tim Roth − guitar, clean vocals (1997−present), lead vocals (1996−2003)
- Troy Bleich − bass, unclean vocals (2005−present)
- Stu Block − lead vocals (2005−2013, 2021−present)
- Bryan Newbury − drums (2011−present)
- Matt Cuthbertson − guitar (2014−present)

=== Former ===
Vocals

- Chris Krall − lead vocals (2003−2004)
- Dean Sternberg − lead vocals (2004)
- Amanda Kiernan − lead vocals (2013–??; touring member: 2012–2013)

Guitars

- Chris Eisler − guitar (1999)
- Daniel Nargang − guitar, clean vocals (2001)
- Rob "Smiley" Doherty − guitar, death growls (2003−2005; died 2012)
- Collin Craig − guitar (2006)
- Justin Bender − guitar (2006−2014)

Bass

- Scott Krall − bass, backing vocals (1997−2005)

Keyboards

- Chris McDougall − keyboards (1999−2001)

Drums

- Jim Austin − drums, death growls (1997−2004, 2006)
- Adam Sagan − drums (2004−2006; died 2016)
- Steve Bolognese − drums (2006−2011)

== Discography ==
=== Studio albums ===
Release date	Title	Label
1999	Into Eternity	DVS
2001	Dead or Dreaming	DVS
2004	Buried in Oblivion	Century Media
2006	The Scattering of Ashes	Century Media
2008	The Incurable Tragedy	Century Media
2018	The Sirens	M-Theory Audio

=== Singles ===
Release date	Title	Label
2011	"Sandstorm"	Century Media
2012	"Fukushima"	

=== Music videos ===
- "Spiraling into Depression" (2004)
- "Severe Emotional Distress" (2006)
- "Timeless Winter" (2007)
- "Time Immemorial" (2008)
