= The Sirens (Into Eternity album) =

Studio album by Into Eternity
- Released: October 26, 2018
- Genre: Progressive power metal, thrash metal, extreme metal
- Length: 50:00
- Label: Kolony Records, M-Theory Audio
- Producer: Justin Bender

Into Eternity chronology
The Incurable Tragedy (2008)	The Sirens (2018)

Professional ratings
Review scores
Source	Rating
Exclaim!	7/10
Metalitalia.com	8/10
Sonic Perspectives	7.3/10

The Sirens is the sixth full-length studio album by Canadian progressive metal band Into Eternity. It was originally planned to be released in late 2015, but after being delayed for a few years, the album was released on October 26, 2018, in Europe through Kolony Records, and in America through M-Theory Audio. This is their first album in a decade, since their 2008 album The Incurable Tragedy, and their first album with drummer Bryan Newbury, lead vocalist Amanda Kiernan, and guitarist Matt Cuthbertson.

== Track listing ==
- All songs written by Into Eternity
- All lyrics written by Tim Roth and Stu Block

No.	Title	Length
1.	"The Sirens"	7:55
2.	"Fringes of Psychosis"	6:58
3.	"Sandstorm"	3:48
4.	"Devoured by Sarcopenia"	7:15
5.	"This Frozen Hell"	7:02
6.	"Nowhere Near"	7:17
7.	"Fukushima"	5:57
8.	"The Scattering of Ashes"	3:48
Total length:		50:00

== Personnel ==
Into Eternity

- Amanda Kiernan − lead vocals
- Tim Roth − guitar, clean vocals
- Matt Cuthbertson − guitar
- Troy Bleich − bass, death vocals
- Bryan Newbury − drums

Production and other

- Recorded, mixed & mastered by Justin Bender at Touchwood Studios, Regina, SK
- Orchestral arrangements by Jason Cullimore
- Artwork by Mattias Norén
