= Stu Block =

Canadian singer

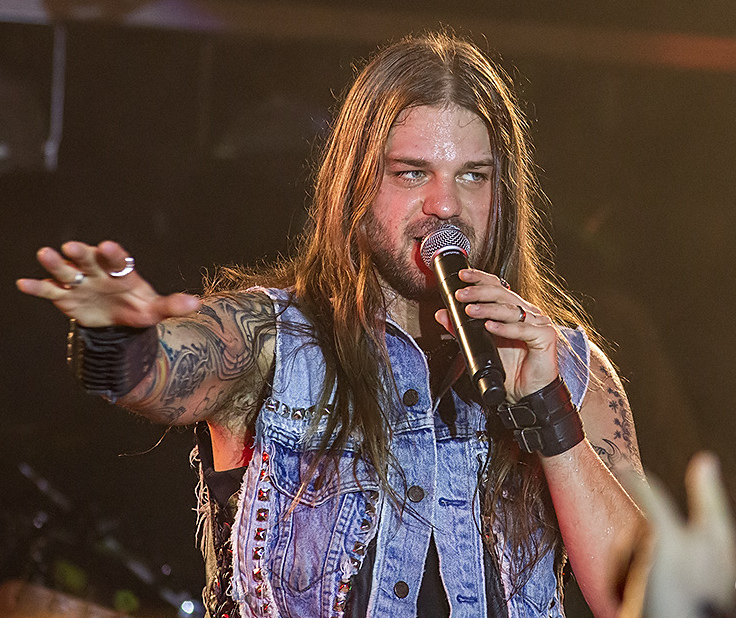
- Block performing with Iced Earth in 2012

Background information
- Also known as: Stuie B, Stucifer
- Born: Stuart Block; November 26, 1977 (age 48)
- Genres: Progressive death metal, melodic death metal, heavy metal, power metal, thrash metal, progressive metal, neo-classical metal
- Occupations: Singer, songwriter
- Member of: Annihilator, Into Eternity, The Midgard Project
- Formerly of: Iced Earth, Omega Crom

Stuart Block (born November 26, 1977) is a Canadian singer who is the lead vocalist of progressive death metal band Into Eternity and a former lead singer of heavy metal band Iced Earth. Before joining Into Eternity in 2005, he began his musical career singing for various bands in Vancouver. After two albums with Into Eternity, he joined Iced Earth in 2011 and recorded three albums during his ten-year tenure with the band: Dystopia (2011), Plagues of Babylon (2014) and Incorruptible (2017). He was the second-longest-tenured vocalist in Iced Earth after Matt Barlow.

== Career ==
=== Early career and Into Eternity ===
Block began his musical career in 1998, singing for various metal and rock acts around Vancouver. Before joining Into Eternity, Block was the singer for the band Omega Crom, among others. In 2005, he joined Eternity, and the following year, the band released their first album with him, The Scattering of Ashes. Block received high praise for his performance, with Eduardo Rivadavia of AllMusic calling him "one of the finest metal voices of his generation". Block's second album with Into Eternity, The Incurable Tragedy, was released in 2008. Respectively, in 2011 and 2012, the band released the singles "Sandstorm" and "Fukushima". Also, in late 2012, Block began demoing new material with Eternity and their new touring vocalist Amanda Kiernan.

He rejoined Into Eternity in 2021 as co-lead vocalist after leaving Iced Earth.

=== Iced Earth ===
In March 2011, it was announced that Block had been chosen as the new lead singer for Iced Earth. Before releasing Block's first album with the group, Iced Earth released a re-recording of their 1995 song "Dante's Inferno" as a free download on their website. Dystopia, Block's first album with Iced Earth, was released on October 18, 2011. The album garnered positive reviews, with some calling it one of Iced Earth's best albums. Block also received praise for his performance. The band released its next Live CD/DVD on April 15, 2013, Live in Ancient Kourion. The album was recorded on August 19, 2012, at the over 2,200-year-old Kourion Theater in Cyprus during the band's Dystopia World Tour.

Iced Earth began writing new material for their eleventh studio album in early 2013. The title was later confirmed as Plagues of Babylon, and the album was released in January 2014. Block's second album with the band received mostly positive reviews overall from music critics. In January 2014, the album reached position No. 5 on the German Media Control Charts. This is Iced Earth's highest chart position in their entire career. The band also reached No. 34 on the Ultratop charts in Belgium. Meanwhile, in the US, the album sold approximately 6,300 copies in its first week to debut at No. 49 on the Billboard 200.

Following a period of inactivity, Iced Earth started writing for their twelfth studio album tentatively titled The Judas Goat, with an expected release date and subsequent touring cycle in early 2016.

On February 15, 2021, a month after Schaffer's arrest following the 2021 storming of the United States Capitol, Block announced that he had left Iced Earth.

=== Annihilator ===
Block recorded the song "Downright Dominate" with Annihilator in late 2021 for their re-recording of the album Metal, titled Metal II. In January 2022, Block would handle lead vocals on the band's future live shows. Guitarist Jeff Waters announced that he would step down as lead vocalist and focusing solely on lead guitar.

== Singing style ==
Block is a self-described "hybrid vocalist", meaning that he uses vocal styles from many different genres of metal. He has cited Bruce Dickinson, Rob Halford, Daniel Heiman, Tim Roth, Matt Barlow, Tim Owens, Devin Townsend, Jari Mäenpää, George "Corpsegrinder" Fisher, Russell Allen and Jørn Lande as his influences.

== Personal life ==
Block's mother was battling cancer when he joined Iced Earth. He wrote the song "End of Innocence", from Iced Earth's Dystopia, for her. She died on August 23, 2013.

== Discography ==
=== Into Eternity ===
- 2006: The Scattering of Ashes
- 2008: The Incurable Tragedy
- 2011: "Sandstorm" (single)
- 2012: "Fukushima" (single)

=== Iced Earth ===
- 2011: "Dante's Inferno 2011" (single)
- 2011: 5 Songs (EP)
- 2011: Dystopia
- 2013: Live in Ancient Kourion
- 2013: The Plagues (EP)
- 2014: Plagues of Babylon
- 2017: Incorruptible

=== Annihilator ===
- 2022: Metal II

=== The Midgard Project ===
- 2022: The Great Divide
