= Fender Jaguar Baritone Custom =

Retro electric bass guitar

Fender Jaguar Baritone Custom/Fender Jaguar Bass VI Custom
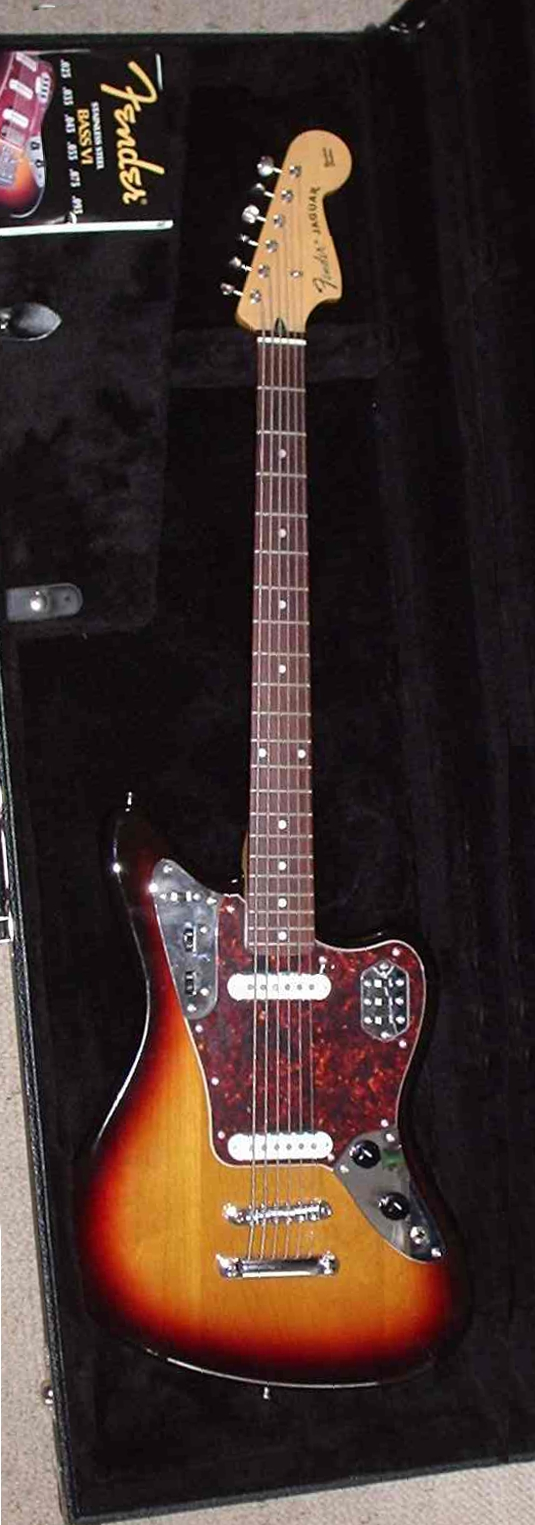
- Manufacturer: Fender
- Period: 2004–2006

Construction
- Body type: Solid
- Neck joint: Bolt-on
- Scale: 28.5 inches (723.9 mm)

Woods
- Body: Alder
- Neck: Maple
- Fretboard: Rosewood

Hardware
- Bridge: Adjusto-Matic Bridge with Anchored-Tailpiece
- Pickup(s): 2 Special Design MIJ Single-Coil Jaguar Pickups (Neck & Bridge)

Colors available
- (as of 2006) 3-Color Sunburst

The Fender Jaguar Baritone Custom is a six-string electric bass guitar manufactured by Fender from 2004 to 2006. It is based on the 1962 Fender Jaguar electric guitar and the 1961 Fender Bass VI.

The term baritone guitar refers to one tuned B to B, between the tunings of a standard guitar and a bass. The tuning for the Baritone Custom is set one octave lower than a standard tuned guitar. It uses the same bass string set as the Bass VI model, but with a shorter scale length, giving the Baritone Custom less string tension. Despite the Bass VI being called a baritone for most of its production run, the Jaguar Baritone Custom was always designed as a bass.

The body shape, pickup, and switching setup are identical to the two-pickup Jaguar model. Its other electrics are similar to the four-string Jaguar Bass, which was issued in 2006 and is still in production today.

It has a fixed bridge rather than the Fender floating tremolo used on the Bass VI and all other Jaguar models. The Baritone Custom, its variant, and models of the Fender Jaguar Special HH are the only guitars to lack a floating tremolo. They all have separate and similar belly-mounted bridges and tailpieces.

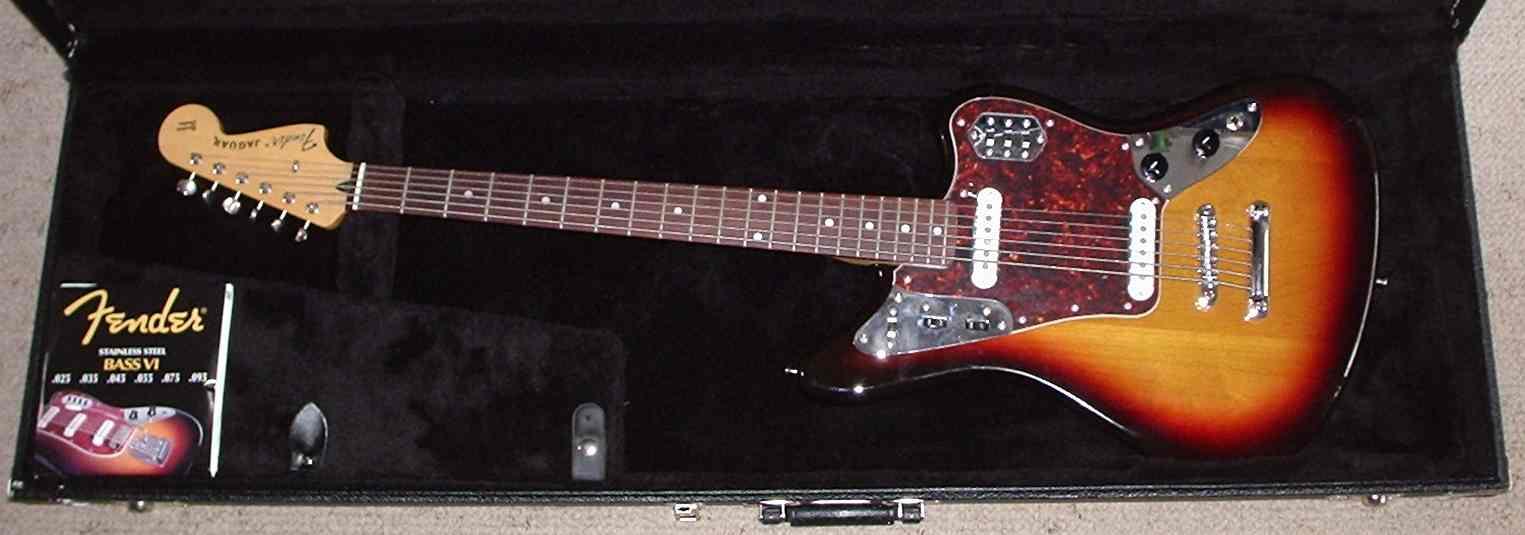
2005 Fender Jaguar Baritone Custom, in a Fender Jazz Bass case

The Jaguar Baritone Custom is a Crafted-In-Japan model, meaning the master has different switches and an unusual internal wiring. It includes a fuzz switch.

In 2006, Fender USA changed the name of the instrument to Jaguar Bass VI Custom. At the end of 2006, Fender discontinued the model entirely.
