= Framing Armageddon: Something Wicked Part 1 =

Studio album by Iced Earth
- Released: September 11, 2007
- Recorded: February–April 2007
- Studio: Soaring Eagle Sound
- Genres: Power metal; heavy metal; thrash metal
- Length: 68:56; 76:57 (Japanese edition)
- Label: SPV

Iced Earth chronology
Overture of the Wicked (2007)	Framing Armageddon: Something Wicked Part 1 (2007)	The Crucible of Man: Something Wicked Part 2 (2008)

Singles from Framing Armageddon
- 1. "Setian Massacre" Released: 2007; 2. "Ten Thousand Strong" Released: 2007

Professional ratings
Review scores
Source	Rating
AllMusic	3.5/5 stars
Jukebox:Metal	3/5 stars
Metal Storm	(8/10)

Framing Armageddon: Something Wicked Part 1 is the eighth studio album from Iced Earth, released on September 11, 2007. It is part one of two concept albums based on a trilogy of songs from Iced Earth's fifth studio album, Something Wicked This Way Comes. The saga, aptly titled the Something Wicked Saga, tells the fictional history of mankind, from its creation to its destruction. It is the second and final album with vocalist Tim "Ripper" Owens. This is also the first album where Schaffer became more involved in playing the guitar solos.

== Production ==
Framing Armageddon is the band's first studio album featuring lead guitarist Troy Seele, and drummer Brent Smedley, who never played on an Iced Earth studio album during his previous stints with the group. Tim "Ripper" Owens makes his final appearance as lead singer on this record, as well. Also, this was bassist Dennis Hayes' first appearance on an Iced Earth album, though he only appears on two songs. Former Iced Earth lead guitarist Tim Mills is featured on "Reflections", and co-wrote both that song and "Infiltrate and Assimilate".

== Composition ==
Tim "Ripper" Owens talked about the story in an interview with Thrash Pit:

It's about how we humans really weren't the first people on Earth, and there were a race of people called the Setians who were actually the first people here on Earth. They didn't have any weapons or technology, and the humans were actually the aliens who attacked and took over Earth. It's pretty unique, but it's kind of hard to talk about the whole story because there's so much going on.

—

== Release ==
In December 2006, Jon Schaffer posted a journal announcing that Iced Earth's new album, then titled Something Wicked – Part 1, would be released in September/October 2007. The follow-up album, then titled Something Wicked – Part 2, would be released in January/February 2008. On March 17, Schaffer announced the final track list, and that the album would be renamed to Framing Armageddon (Something Wicked Part 1), with a new target release of August or September.

A music video for "Ten Thousand Strong" was released, though lead guitarist Troy Seele was not yet with the band when it was filmed. The video features rotoscoping.

The Korean release of Framing Armageddon features the album's single, "Overture of the Wicked," as a bonus disc.

Jon Schaffer had intended to release both of the Something Wicked albums in one boxed set, with Matt Barlow contributing the vocals on both albums for the sake of continuity, plus adding at least four songs to The Crucible of Man and remixing Framing Armageddon. However Matt Barlow once again left the band before these plans came to fruition.

In 2008, a re-sung version of "Setian Massacre" was included on the single "I Walk Among You". Tim "Ripper" Owens' vocals had been re-recorded by the singer Matt Barlow, whom Owens had originally replaced in 2003.

== Track listing ==
No.	Title	Lyrics	Music	Length
1.	"Overture"	(instrumental)	Jon Schaffer	2:24
2.	"Something Wicked (Part 1)"	Schaffer	Schaffer	5:03
3.	"Invasion"	(instrumental)	Schaffer	1:00
4.	"Motivation of Man"	Schaffer	Schaffer	1:34
5.	"Setian Massacre"	Schaffer	Schaffer	3:49
6.	"A Charge to Keep"	Schaffer	Schaffer	4:24
7.	"Reflections"	Schaffer	Tim Mills; Schaffer	1:50
8.	"Ten Thousand Strong"	Schaffer	Schaffer	3:54
9.	"Execution"	(instrumental)	Schaffer	1:27
10.	"Order of the Rose"	Schaffer	Schaffer	4:52
11.	"Cataclysm"	(instrumental)	Schaffer	1:30
12.	"The Clouding"	Schaffer	Schaffer	9:19
13.	"Infiltrate and Assimilate"	Schaffer	Mills; Schaffer	3:48
14.	"Retribution Through the Ages"	Schaffer	Schaffer	4:32
15.	"Something Wicked (Part 2)"	(instrumental)	Schaffer	2:59
16.	"The Domino Decree"	Schaffer	Tim Owens; Schaffer	6:36
17.	"Framing Armageddon"	Schaffer	Schaffer	3:41
18.	"When Stars Collide (Born Is He)"	Schaffer	Schaffer	4:18
19.	"The Awakening"	(instrumental)	Schaffer	2:01
Total length:				68:52

Japanese bonus track
No.	Title	Lyrics	Music	Length
20.	"The Coming Curse" (2007 Re-Recorded)	Schaffer	Schaffer	8:01
Total length:				76:57

== Personnel ==
- Tim "Ripper" Owens – lead/backing vocals
- Jon Schaffer – lead/rhythm/acoustic guitars; bass guitars; backing vocals
- Brent Smedley – drums/backing vocals

=== Additional personnel ===
- Troy Seele – guitar solos (tracks 5,6,10,12,14 and 17)
- Dennis Hayes – bass guitars (7); fretless bass guitar (12)
- Jim Morris – lead guitars (16); backing vocals
- Tim Mills – clean guitars (7)
- Howard Helm – keyboards; Hammond organ; backing vocals
- Steve Rogowski – cello
- Todd Plant – backing vocals
- Patina Ripkey – backing vocals
- Debbie Harrell – backing vocals
- Kathy Helm – backing vocals
- Jason Blackerby – backing vocals
