= Metal (Annihilator album) =

Studio album by Annihilator
- Released: April 16, 2007
- Recorded: 2006–2007
- Studio: Watersound Studios, Ottawa, Canada; Sanctum Sound, Boston, U.S. Spider Studios, Strongsville, U.S. Backstage Recording Studios, Derbyshire, England; The Concrete Jungle, Toronto, Canada
- Genre: Thrash metal, heavy metal
- Length: 54:58
- Label: SPV/Steamhammer
- Producer: Jeff Waters

Annihilator chronology
Schizo Deluxe (2005)	Metal (2007)	Live at Masters of Rock (2009)

Metal is the twelfth album by Canadian heavy metal band Annihilator, released on April 16, 2007, by SPV/Steamhammer. However, it was not released in the United States until January 15, 2008. The album includes several special guests who each contribute to separate tracks. This includes Danko Jones, Angela Gossow, Steve "Lips" Kudlow, Alexi Laiho, Anders Björler, Michael Amott, Jesper Strömblad, Corey Beaulieu, Jacob Lynam and William Adler.

A re-recording of the album titled Metal II was released in 2022.

== Reception ==
Professional ratings
Review scores
Source	Rating
AllMusic	3.5/5 stars
Metal Storm	8/10 stars
Metal Hammer	2/5 stars
Blabbermouth	8/10

2007's Metal was received rather negatively by fans and received mixed to decent reviews from critics. From Metal Storm a reviewer gave it a positive review, stating that while the idea to have a guest on each song of the CD is good, the problem is that "it can sound a bit "false" sometimes too. I mean that it can be a bit like a copy-paste when the musicians didn't really work together. If a song like "Army Of One" with its federator Metal chorus or "Downright Dominate" sounds like a real collaboration some other songs like "Clown Parade" (even with an incredible solo performed by Jeff Loomis) or Couple Suicide (especially with the choruses performed by Angela Gossow) are a bit more unnatural." Following this they spoke on the positives of the album, complimenting the fact that "the riffs are great, the solos are exceptional, the voice of Dave Padden is good but definitely not "thrashy" so even if it's pleasant to listen to "Metal", that's a fact it's not a real album of Thrash Metal a la Kreator or Slayer." They ended their review with "Metal is not the album of the year. It's not a perfect and pure Thrash album too, but it's always cool to listen to it, and definitely, Jeff Waters knows how to write some great killer riffs and I'm quite sure that the new songs will be great live. Don't expect real Thrash here but for sure you can expect some good nice music."

== Track listing ==
All tracks are written by Jeff Waters, except lyrics and melodies of "Couple Suicide" (Danko Jones).

Metal track listing
No.	Title	Featuring	Length
1.	"Clown Parade"	Jeff Loomis of Nevermore	5:14
2.	"Couple Suicide"	Danko Jones; Angela Gossow of Arch Enemy	3:54
3.	"Army of One"	Steve "Lips" Kudlow of Anvil	6:01
4.	"Downright Dominate"	Alexi Laiho of Children of Bodom	5:13
5.	"Smothered"	Anders Björler of The Haunted	5:09
6.	"Operation Annihilation"	Michael Amott of Arch Enemy	5:16
7.	"Haunted"	Jesper Strömblad of In Flames	8:05
8.	"Kicked"	Corey Beaulieu of Trivium	5:56
9.	"Detonation"	Jacob Lynam of Lynam	3:54
10.	"Chasing the High"	Willie Adler of Lamb of God	6:16

Japanese bonus track
No.	Title	Featuring	Length
11.	"Heavy Metal Maniac" (Exciter cover)	Dan Beehler and Allan James Johnson	3:53

Limited edition CD2 track listing
No.	Title	Length
1.	"Carnival Diablos"	5:06
2.	"Time Bomb"	4:46
3.	"Blackest Day"	5:06
4.	"My Precious Lunatic Asylum"	5:46
5.	"Shallow Grave (Live)"	5:04
6.	"Murder"	4:26
7.	"Tricks and Traps"	4:57
8.	"Refresh the Demon"	5:26
9.	"Ultra Paranoia"	4:28
10.	"King of the Kill"	3:11
11.	"Second to None"	0:52

== Metal II ==
Metal II, a near complete re-recording of Metal, was released on February 18, 2022, which serves as a tribute to Eddie Van Halen and Alexi Laiho, the latter of whom appears posthumously on one of the album's re-recorded tracks "Downright Dominate", which also features Dave Lombardo on drums and Stu Block on vocals. In January 2022, Jeff Waters announced that he would be once again stepping down as lead vocalist and focusing solely on lead guitar while Stu Block would handle lead vocals on the band's future live shows.

All tracks are written by Jeff Waters, except lyrics and melodies of "Couple Suicide" (Danko Jones).

Metal II track listing
No.	Title	Featuring	Length
1.	"Chasing the High"	Willie Adler of Lamb of God	6:16
2.	"Downright Dominate"	Alexi Laiho of Children of Bodom	5:38
3.	"Army of One"	Steve "Lips" Kudlow of Anvil	6:01
4.	"Couple Suicide"	Danko Jones; Angela Gossow of Arch Enemy	3:53
5.	"Heavy Metal Maniac" (Exciter cover)	Dan Beehler and Allan James Johnson	3:54
6.	"Haunted"	Jesper Strömblad of In Flames	8:44
7.	"Romeo Delight" (Van Halen cover)		4:16
8.	"Detonation"	Jacob Lynam of Lynam	3:39
9.	"Clown Parade"	Jeff Loomis of Nevermore	5:14
10.	"Smothered"	Anders Björler of The Haunted	5:20
11.	"Kicked"	Corey Beaulieu of Trivium	5:56

=== Reception ===
Reception of the 2022 re-recording has been positive from fans and range from decent to negative from critics. A reviewer from The Moshville Times questioned its existence, unsure as to why it was made. "I just don't see the point of it, the changes being so minor compared to the original. Both releases have excellent production, and the major differences are in the drum fills. I'd have to say that this is one for the completist, or for someone who doesn't already have Metal already. A curiosity rather than a necessity." Of Louder Sound a reviewer of Metal Hammer spoke more harshly of the album, saying that "the songs are as bland now as ever. Army Of One idolizes metal with the creativity of a Wikipedia list ('Anthrax! Motörhead! Exodus! Slayer! Bang your head!'), while the album's melodies couldn't be flatter if they were pummelled beneath an iron foundry press. This is especially true of Couple Suicide's glam schmaltz, where Danko Jones and Angela Gossow's vocals have been mechanized and muddied by time." they concluded their review by stating that "If terrible ideas weighed a gram, this would be heavier than the Eiffel Tower."

A more positive review came from Blabbermouth where the reviewer spoke positively of the album, saying that "[Metal] feels like an excellent entry point for diehard fans and newcomers. The title tells you what to expect. The album delivers. Your neck is going to hurt."

== Personnel ==
=== Metal ===
Band

- Dave Padden – vocals, rhythm guitar
- Jeff Waters – lead guitar, bass, and lead vocals on "Operation Annihilation"
- Mike Mangini – drums

Session members

- Danko Jones – vocals (track 2)
- Angela Gossow – vocals (track 2)
- William Adler – guitars (lead) (track 10)
- Corey Beaulieu – guitars (lead) (track 8)
- Alexi Laiho – guitars (lead) (track 4)
- Michael Amott – guitars (lead) (track 6)
- Jeff Loomis – guitars (lead) (track 1)
- Anders Björler – guitars (lead) (track 5)
- Jesper Strömblad – guitars (lead) (track 7)
- Steve "Lips" Kudlow – guitars (lead) (track 3)
- Jacob Lynam – guitars (lead) (track 9)
- Allan Johnson – bass (track 11), backing vocals
- Dan Beehler – drums, vocals (track 11), backing vocals
- Jacques Bélanger – backing vocals
- John Perinbam – backing vocals
- Paul Malek – backing vocals
- Brian Stephenson – backing vocals
- Bob Walden – backing vocals
- Scott Walsh – backing vocals

Miscellaneous staff

- Jeff Waters – engineering, mixing, producer
- Jeff Yurek – engineering
- Andy Sneap – engineering
- Vic Florencia – engineering
- Ben Schigel – engineering (additional)
- Adam Ayan – mastering
- Gyula Havancsák – cover art, design

=== Metal II ===
Band

- Stu Block – lead vocals
- Jeff Waters – guitars, bass, co-lead vocals
- Dave Lombardo – drums

Session members

- Danko Jones – vocals (track 4)
- Angela Gossow – vocals (track 4)
- Dan Beehler – drums, vocals (track 5)
- Allan Johnson – bass (track 5)
- Willie Adler – guitars (lead) (track 1)
- Alexi Laiho – guitars (lead) (tracks 2, 7)
- Steve "Lips" Kudlow – guitars (lead) (track 3)
- Jesper Strömblad – guitars (lead) (track 6)
- Jacob Lynam – guitars (lead) (track 8)
- Jeff Loomis – guitars (lead) (track 9)
- Anders Björler – guitars (lead) (track 10)
- Corey Beaulieu – guitars (lead) (track 11)

Miscellaneous staff

- Mike Fraser – mixing, engineering
- Maor Appelbaum - remastering
