= The Incurable Tragedy =

Studio album by Into Eternity
- Released: August 22, 2008
- Recorded: 2008
- Genre: Progressive metal, melodic death metal
- Length: 38:57
- Label: Century Media
- Producer: Grant Hall and John Gasparic

Into Eternity chronology
The Scattering of Ashes (2006)	The Incurable Tragedy (2008)	The Sirens (2018)

The Incurable Tragedy is the fifth full-length studio album by Canadian progressive death metal band Into Eternity. The album was released on August 25, 2008, in Europe through Century Media Records. This is the first album which does not feature longtime drummer Jim Austin, and the first to feature new drummer Steve Bolognese (although Steve toured with Into Eternity during the tour supporting Scattering of Ashes and appeared in the "Timeless Winter" video from the same album), and guitarist Justin Bender.

According to the band's site, the album is a concept album focusing on the struggles of a man who is diagnosed with a terminal illness, specifically cancer. The concept was inspired by the deaths of the two best friends and father of guitarist Tim Roth.

The first single off the album is "Time Immemorial", and the music video for the song was released on the band's MySpace page on December 10, 2008.

== Critical reception ==
Professional ratings
Review scores
Source	Rating
Allmusic	4/5 stars
Sputnikmusic	1.5/5 stars
Decoy Music	4/5 stars

In its first week of release, the album sold 1,900 copies in the United States.

== Track listing ==
- All songs written by Into Eternity
- All lyrics written by Tim Roth and Stu Block

No.	Title	Length
1.	"Prelude to Woe"	0:55
2.	"Tides of Blood"	3:46
3.	"Spent Years of Regret"	4:15
4.	"Symptoms"	1:48
5.	"Diagnosis Terminal"	3:31
6.	"The Incurable Tragedy I (September 21, 2006)"	2:49
7.	"Indignation"	3:58
8.	"Time Immemorial"	4:15
9.	"The Incurable Tragedy II (November 10, 2006)"	3:37
10.	"A Black Light Ending"	3:33
11.	"One Funeral Hymn for Three"	4:10
12.	"The Incurable Tragedy III (December 25, 2007)"	2:20
Total length:		38:57

== Personnel ==
Credits are adapted from the album's liner notes.

Into Eternity

- Stu Block − lead vocals
- Tim Roth − clean vocals, guitar
- Troy Bleich − bass
- Steve Bolognese − drums
- Justin Bender − guitar

Production and other

- Recorded, mixed & mastered at Touchwood Studios, Regina, SK
- Produced and engineered by Grant Hall and John Gasparic
- Mixed and mastered by Grant Hall
- Mixing assistant: Justin Bender
- Additional Pro Tools editing: Tyler Kuntz and Justin Bender
- Artwork: Mattias Norén,
- Band photos: Cortney Bodnar − Light Artist Photography,
