= Fender Jaguar Bass =

Electric bass guitar

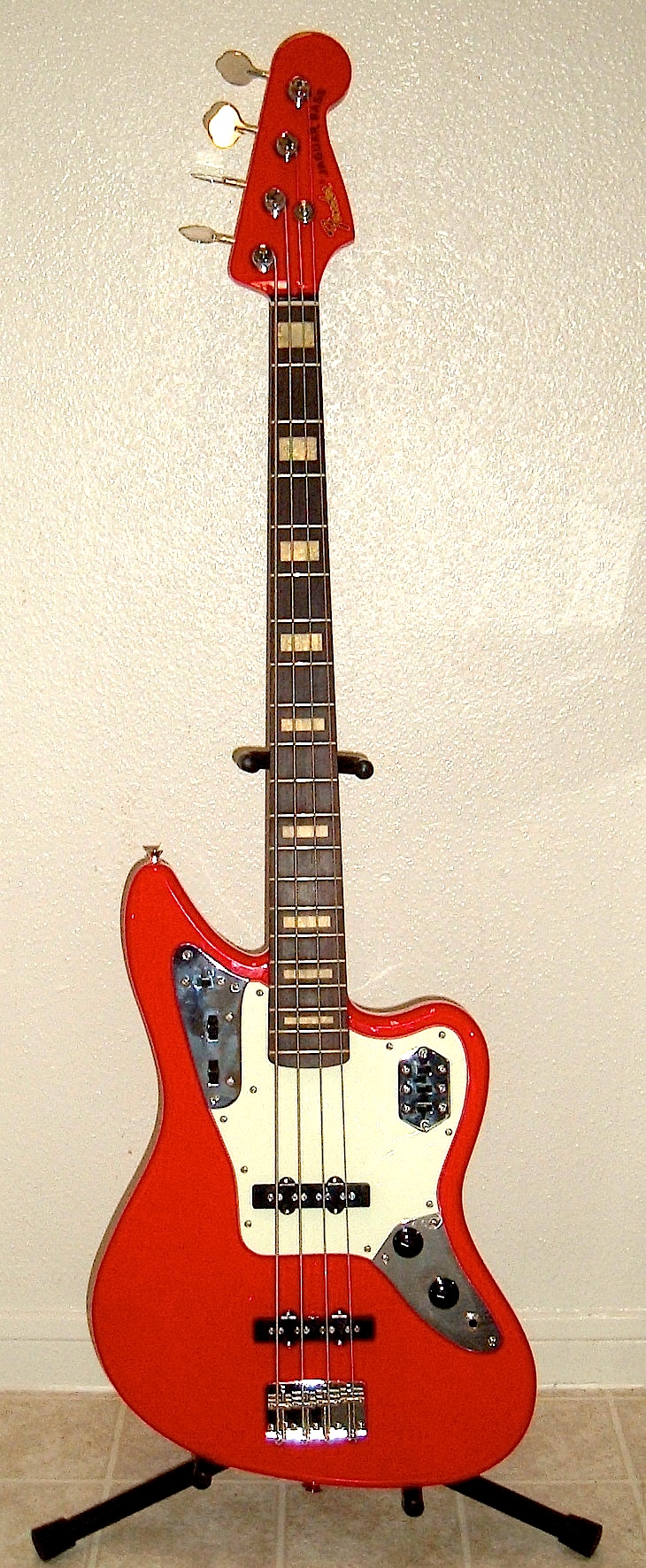
- Manufacturer: Fender Musical Instruments Corporation
- Period: 2005–10, 2011–present

Construction
- Body type: Solid
- Neck joint: Bolt-on
- Scale: 34", 30" and 32"

Woods
- Body: Alder
- Neck: Maple
- Fretboard: Rosewood, maple, pau ferro

Hardware
- Bridge: Standard 4-Saddle
- Pickup(s): Two Jazz Bass single-coil pickups (2005-present) One Precision Bass split-coil pickup and one Jazz Bass single-coil pickup (2010-present)

Colors available
- (as of 2008) Black, Hot Rod Red (with matching headstock only), 3-Color Sunburst, Olympic White. (As of 2011) 3-Tone Sunburst, Candy Apple Red, Cobalt Blue.

The Fender Jaguar Bass is an electric bass guitar currently manufactured in Mexico by the Fender Musical Instruments Corporation.

== Design ==
In appearance, the Jaguar Bass is largely faithful to the original Fender Jaguar, with exception of the neck, bridge, and pickups taken from both the Fender Jazz Bass and Fender Precision Bass, though the Jaguar Deluxe Bass has only Jazz bass components. Rather than the standard dot position markers, however, the Jaguar bass has aged pearloid block inlays, a feature generally reserved for premium instruments. The bass also has a standard vintage-style top-loading bridge and tuners. An onboard preamp is controlled by bass/treble boost rollers and an on/off switch located on the top control panel. The lower control panel holds on/off switches for each of the pickups, and a switch to toggle between parallel and series wiring of the pickups. Finally, the master control panel holds the master volume, master tone, and jack. Other features include an alder body, C-shaped maple neck, 7.25"-radius rosewood fretboard with 20 medium jumbo frets.

The basic tone of the Jaguar Bass is very similar to its stablemate, the Jazz Bass, and retains the signature "growl" of the latter. The complex controls, however, lend it a unique tonal flexibility not found in any other Fender instrument. For example, Bass Player Magazine notes that the Jaguar Bass can deliver "a convincing P-Bass sound ripe for Motown fingerstyle."

== History ==
In 1960, Fender introduced the Jazz Bass. Fender marketed the Jazz Bass as a stablemate to the Fender Stratocaster electric guitar, as it featured a narrower neck which was meant to appeal to jazz musicians. The following year, Fender released the Bass VI, which featured six strings and a short-scale neck. The Bass VI also had a switch-based control layout, and was essentially a precursor to the Fender Jaguar released in 1962.

Fender produced the Jaguar electric guitar until 1975, when both the Bass VI and Jaguar lines were discontinued. However, the model was revived in 1999 due to the popularity of the Jaguar (and the similar Fender Jazzmaster) amongst indie rock musicians. From 2004 to 2006, Fender also produced the Jaguar Bass VI Custom, a cross between the Bass VI and the Jaguar.

Prior to the forthcoming discontinuation of the Jaguar Bass VI Custom, Fender unveiled the Jaguar Bass at the NAMM Show in 2006. The Jaguar Bass was originally made available in the United States in Black and Hot Rod Red with a matching headstock. Although the Jaguar Bass was also manufactured in Olympic White and 3-color Sunburst, these finishes were only available in the Japanese domestic market. The full range of finish options was launched globally in 2008.

== Variations ==
=== Fender ===
==== American Standard ====
Released in 2014 and now discontinued. It is available in three color Sunburst, Olympic White (four-ply brown tortoiseshell pickguard), Black and Mystic Red (three-ply mint green pickguard) as only Right-Handed versions.

The American Standard features an alder body and American Vintage 1963 alnico V Precision and ceramic single-coil Jazz pickups. The Jazz Bass pickup has adjustable hex-screw polepieces. The maple neck has 20 frets and is graphite reinforced with a 9.5"-radius rosewood fingerboard and aged white pearloid rectangular block inlays. Other refinements include a StrongArm stealth retainer bar for the A string, Fender "F" lightweight vintage paddle tuners with tapered shafts and an HMV bridge. Controls include master volume, master tone, pickup on/off and series/parallel switching and an active/passive switch for a dual-circuit design with inset bass and treble control wheels.

==== Japan ====
===== First generation =====
(2005–2010): Available in Black, Olympic White and Hot Rod Red. Right-Handed versions only.

===== Deluxe =====
(2011–unknown): Available in 3-Color Sunburst, Black, Cobalt Blue and Candy Apple Red. Right-Handed versions only.

==== Pawn Shop Reverse ====
Under the "Pawn Shop" series of 2012, Fender released a Jaguar Bass with a reverse body and headstock. It features a maple neck and fretboard with dot inlays, Dual "Music Man" humbucking pickups made famous on Ernie Ball "Music Man" basses, one volume and tone knob and one pickup selector switch and has a Medium (32") scale length. This bass is Mexican made.

2012, available in 2-Color Sunburst, Black and Candy Apple Red. Right-Handed versions only.

==== Player ====
Fall 2011–2014, available in black only. Right-handed versions only.

The Player Jaguar Bass sports a koto body, an unbound C-shaped maple neck, maple fretboard with 9.5-inch radius, black block inlays and 20 jumbo frets, three-ply parchment pickguard, Player PJ pickups, three Jazz Bass control knobs (neck volume, bridge volume, master tone), vintage-style four-saddle bridge with brass saddles, open-gear tuners and nickel/chrome hardware.

Made in Mexico: 2018–present: Available in Tidepool, Silver, Capri Orange, Sea Foam Green, Sonic Red (discontinued), and Sage Green Metallic (discontinued).

==== Signature Editions ====
===== Mark Hoppus =====
In 2022, Fender began manufacturing signature Jaguar Bass models for Blink-182 bassist/vocalist Mark Hoppus (who had been playing Jaguar Basses since 2015) to sell exclusively through his "Hi My Name Is Mark" website. Specs include an alder body, a Precision C-shaped neck, pau ferro fretboard, reverse Precision pickups, and a single volume control. The basses are produced in limited runs based on customer demand and have been released in Hot Pink and Daphne Blue colors.

In 2024, Fender officially released a limited edition signature Jaguar Bass in sunburst and Sea Foam Green colors, the latter of which features a matching headstock. Unlike the previous model, this new version features the Seymour Duncan Quarter Pound (SPB-3) pickup, as well as a thinner Jazz Bass neck with a rosewood fretboard in accordance with Hoppus' preferred specs.

===== Troy Sanders =====
Troy Sanders is the bassist and vocalist of Mastodon. This bass comes in Silverburst color with pearloid block inlays, Precision/Jazz pickups, volume control, and an active 3-band equalizer.

The Fender has a matching headstock and a Mastodon logo on the neckplate. It also features an active/passive switch, bass boost/cut, and treble boost/cut.

=== Squier ===
==== Affinity Humbucker ====
This entry model is described as having a thin and lightweight body, a 32" scale, and vintage-style open-gear tuning machines. The prominent feature is a ceramic Music Man Stingray style humbucking pickup.

Classic Vibe

==== Vintage Modified ====
2010–unknown discontinue date, available initially in Black, with Sunburst and Candy Apple Red models introduced in limited numbers starting in 2012. Right-Handed versions only.

In 2010, Fender introduced the premium priced Squier Vintage Modified Jaguar Bass with a black body, matching headstock and pearloid block inlays. The bass is closer to the Jazzmaster than the Jaguar in appearance, due to the absence of any controls other than stacked volume/tone potentiometers similar in design to the early versions of the Jazz Bass. Other features include a P/J pickup layout, maple neck and rosewood fretboard.

===== Vintage Modified Special =====
2011–unknown discontinue date, single coil version available in 3-Color Sunburst, Black and Crimson Red. Humbucker version in Black, Silver and Candy Apple Red. Right-Handed versions only.

In 2011, the Jaguar Bass Special was introduced with the choice of P/J ("P" as in Fender Precision Bass and "J" as in Fender Jazz Bass, and mixes the sounds of both) or single humbucker pickups and Jazz Bass knobs/control plate. While the Jaguar Bass Special features a split-coil Precision neck pickup and a single-coil Jazz Bass bridge pickup paired with an active bass boost circuit and treble control, the Jaguar Bass Special HB uses a high-output humbucking pickup and a 3-band active EQ. Other features include a solid basswood or agathis body (depending the finish) and a maple neck with a 20-fret rosewood fretboard and pearloid dot inlays. The 5-string version was introduced in 2013.

===== Vintage Modified Special Short Scale =====
Released mid-2011 and discontinued in 2019, available in Black, Candy Apple Red and Silver. Right-Handed versions only.

This Short Scale model features a P/J set. It also features a solid agathis body, which is commonly used in the manufacture of low priced guitars due to its good resonating properties, yet relatively low price of production. Also a 20-fret maple neck with a rosewood fretboard and a 30"-scale.

==== Troy Sanders Signature ====
This bass is similar to the Fender version and also comes in Silverburst color with pearloid block inlays, Precision/Jazz pickups, volume control, and an active 3-band equalizer.

The Squier has a black headstock with a Mastodon logo and lacks the advanced controls of the Fender.

== Jaguar Bass players ==
- Sienna DeGovia
- Matt Freeman
- Eva Gardner
- Georg Hólm
- Justin Meldal-Johnsen
- Ryan Roberts
- Tyson Ritter
- Zubin Sedghi
- Matthew Taylor

== Literature ==
- Peter Bertges: The Fender Reference; Bomots, Saarbrücken 2007, ISBN 978-3-939316-38-1
