= Buried in Oblivion =

Studio album by Into Eternity
- Released: February 10, 2004
- Recorded: April 21 to September 21, 2003
- Studio: Touchwood Studios, Regina, SK, Canada
- Genre: Progressive metal, melodic death metal
- Length: 44:37
- Label: Century Media
- Producer: Johnny "Six Pack" Gasparic; Scott Krall

Into Eternity chronology
| Dead or Dreaming (2001) | Buried in Oblivion (2004) | The Scattering of Ashes (2006) |

Buried in Oblivion is the third full-length studio album by the Canadian metal band Into Eternity, released on February 10, 2004, by Century Media Records. Track 6, "Spiraling Into Depression", became the band's first single and first video.

== Reception ==
Professional ratings
Review scores
| Source | Rating |
|---|---|
| Allmusic | 3/5 stars |
| Rock Hard | 10/10 |

In 2005, Buried in Oblivion was ranked number 385 in Rock Hard magazine's book The 500 Greatest Rock & Metal Albums of All Time.

== Track listing ==
- All songs written, performed, and arranged by Into Eternity
- All lyrics written by Tim Roth, Rob Doherty, and Chris Krall
- All songs 2004 Magic Arts Publishing

| No. | Title | Length |
|---|---|---|
| 1. | "Splintered Visions" | 4:55 |
| 2. | "Embraced by Desolation" | 4:08 |
| 3. | "3 Dimensional Aperture" | 4:46 |
| 4. | "Beginning of the End" | 4:39 |
| 5. | "Point of Uncertainty" | 3:45 |
| 6. | "Spiraling into Depression" | 3:35 |
| 7. | "Isolation" | 4:57 |
| 8. | "Buried in Oblivion" | 4:00 |
| 9. | "Black Sea of Agony" | 6:31 |
| 10. | "Morose Seclusion" | 3:21 |

== Personnel ==
Credits are adapted from the album's liner notes.

Into Eternity

- Jim Austin – drums, percussion, death vocals
- Scott Krall – bass, backing vocals
- Rob Doherty − guitar, death vocals
- Tim Roth – lead vocals, guitar
- Chris Krall − lead vocals

Production and other

- Symphonic arrangements written and performed by Scott Krall
- Produced by Scott Krall and Johnny "Six Pack" Gasparic
- Recorded, mixed & mastered – April 21, 2003, to September 21, 2003, at Touchwood Studios, Regina, SK, Canada
- Mixed & mastered by Grant Hall and Johnny "Six Pack" Gasparic. Assisted by Into Eternity
- Engineered by Scott Krall, Johnny "Six Pack" Gasparic
- Artwork, Logo & Layout by Mattias Norén.
- Band photo by Darrol Hofmeister
