= Dave's Guitar Shop =

American musical instrument retailer

- Company type: Private
- Industry: Musical instruments
- Founded: 1982; 44 years ago in La Crosse, Wisconsin, U.S.
- Founder: Dave Rogers
- Headquarters: La Crosse, Wisconsin, U.S.
- Number of locations: 4
- Products: Electric guitars; Guitar & bass amplifiers; Acoustic guitars
- Owner: Dave Rogers
- Website: davesguitar.com

Dave's Guitar Shop is a musical instrument store with four locations in Wisconsin. The company sells guitars, amplifiers, and other guitar-related accessories. The La Crosse location houses a multi-million dollar guitar and amplifier museum which is open to the public.

== History ==
Dave Rogers started his guitar business by selling instruments out of his home, opening his first store in La Crosse, Wisconsin in 1982 at the former location of a Shakey's Pizza Parlor. In 2017, Rogers expanded Dave's La Crosse location and Coalition Drum Shop relocated within the expanded store. The store in La Crosse now carries an inventory of over 3,000 guitars.

In 2017, the company opened a second retail location in Milwaukee, carrying over 400 guitars and specializing in guitar repair. In October 2019, the Milwaukee store relocated to a larger building.

In 2018, Dave's opened its third retail location in Madison. While this store's product offerings and repair services are similar to the company's other stores, it specialize in boutique acoustic guitar manufacturers like Goodall, Huss & Dalton, Flammang, and Collings Guitars.

== Locations ==
- La Crosse, Wisconsin, opened in 1982
- Milwaukee, Wisconsin, opened May 2017
- Madison, Wisconsin, opened June 1, 2018
- Marshfield, Wisconsin Opened August 2022

=== The Museum ===
The original Dave's Guitar Shop in La Crosse houses a guitar and amplifier museum on the second floor. There are more than 300 vintage guitars and amplifiers in the museum. There are individual guitars in the museum that are valued at $500,000. The entire collection is open to the public.

== See also ==
Warman's Vintage Guitars Field Guide: Values and Identification by Dave Rogers
