= Plagues of Babylon =

Studio album by Iced Earth
- Released: January 6, 2014
- Recorded: July 15 – August 8, 2013
- Studios: Principal Studios, Senden, Germany
- Genres: Power metal; heavy metal; thrash metal
- Length: 62:03
- Label: Century Media
- Producer: Jon Schaffer

Iced Earth chronology
Live in Ancient Kourion (2013)	Plagues of Babylon (2014)	Incorruptible (2017)

Plagues of Babylon is the eleventh studio album by American heavy metal band Iced Earth. Released in January 2014, the album is the group's first studio release with bassist Luke Appleton and the only with drummer Raphael Saini, who was a guest on the album. According to rhythm guitarist and band leader Jon Schaffer, half of the album is focused on his "Something Wicked" concept, while the other half are stand-alone songs.

== Overview ==
The album was originally set to be released in October 2013, but was pushed back due to Iced Earth's tour commitments in the fall. The band began recording in Germany on July 15, 2013, at Principal Studios. On August 8, 2013, it was announced that the band had completed tracking the album. On September 3, the band announced they had completed mixing and mastering Plagues of Babylon. On September 25, the official track listing and album cover were released.

On October 7, Iced Earth announced that would be releasing a limited edition vinyl EP entitled The Plagues. The EP will contain three songs from Plagues of Babylon, and will be made available on Iced Earth's European tour with Volbeat. On October 11, the lyric video for the album's title track was released.

The December 2013 issue of Germany's Metal Hammer magazine featured the song "Peacemaker" on the attached CD and the December 2013 issue of Germany's RockHard magazine featured the song "Among the Living Dead" on the attached CD. A song titled "Spirit of the Times" was originally released by Schaffer's side project Sons of Liberty, and was re-recorded for this album's release. The song "Highwayman" is a cover originally written by Jimmy Webb.

== Reception ==
Professional ratings
Review scores
Source	Rating
About.com	2.5/5 stars
AllMusic	3/5 stars
Blabbermouth.net	(7.5/10)
Loudwire	3.5/5 stars
Metal Storm	(7.4/10)
metal.de	4/5 stars
Metal-Hammer	(5/7)
Metal-Temple.com	4/5 stars
Powermetal.de	7.5/10 stars
Revolver Magazine	3/5 stars
Stormbringer	3.5/5 stars

Plagues of Babylon received mostly positive reviews overall from music critics. In January 2014, the album reached position No. 5 on the German Media Control Charts. This is the band's highest chart position in their entire career. The band also reached No. 34 on the Ultratop Charts in Belgium. Meanwhile, in the US, the album sold approximately 6,300 copies in its first week to debut at No. 49 on the Billboard 200.

== Track listing ==
No.	Title	Writer(s)	Length
1.	"Plagues of Babylon"	Jon Schaffer	7:47
2.	"Democide"	Schaffer; Stu Block	5:22
3.	"The Culling"	Schaffer; Troy Seele; Block	4:26
4.	"Among the Living Dead"	Schaffer; Seele; Block	5:14
5.	"Resistance"	Schaffer; Seele; Luke Appleton; Block	4:59
6.	"The End?"	Schaffer; Appleton; Block	7:13
7.	"If I Could See You"	Schaffer	3:55
8.	"Cthulhu"	Schaffer; Block	6:04
9.	"Peacemaker"	Schaffer; Block	5:02
10.	"Parasite"	Schaffer; Seele; Block	3:30
11.	"Spirit of the Times" (Sons of Liberty cover)	Schaffer	5:05
12.	"Highwayman" (Jimmy Webb cover)	Jimmy Webb	3:12
13.	"Outro" (unlisted)		0:24
Total length:			1:02:13

== Personnel ==
Iced Earth

- Stu Block – lead vocals, backing vocals
- Jon Schaffer – rhythm and lead guitar, acoustic guitar, backing vocals, lead vocals on "Highwayman"
- Troy Seele – lead guitar
- Luke Appleton – bass

Additional musicians

- Raphael Saini – drums
- Michael Poulsen – lead and backing vocals on "Highwayman"
- Russell Allen – lead and backing vocals on "Highwayman"
- Hansi Kürsch – lead vocals on "Among the Living Dead", backing vocals
- Thomas Hackmann – backing vocals
- Andrew Peters – backing vocals
- Matt O'Rourke – backing vocals
- Bonna Ross Bernal – backing vocals
- Daniel Schmitz – marching drums
- David Hambach – marching drums
- Christopher Jobi – marching drums

Production and design

- Eliran Kantor – cover art
- Kevin Paul and Jon Schaffer – mixing
- Sascha Buhren – mastering
