= Live in Ancient Kourion =

Live album by Iced Earth
- Released: April 15, 2013
- Recorded: August 19, 2012
- Venue: Kourion Theater
- Genres: Power metal; heavy metal; thrash metal
- Length: 143:50
- Label: Century Media
- Producer: Jim Morris

Iced Earth chronology
Dystopia (2011)	Live in Ancient Kourion (2013)	Plagues of Babylon (2014)

Live in Ancient Kourion is a live album by American heavy metal band Iced Earth. The album was recorded August 19, 2012, at the 2300 year-old Kourion Theater in Kourion, Cyprus during the band's Dystopia World Tour.

== Track listing ==
Disk I
No.	Title	Length
1.	"Intro"	1:22
2.	"Dystopia"	4:53
3.	"Burning Times"	3:37
4.	"Angel's Holocaust"	4:34
5.	"Slave to the Dark"	4:49
6.	"V"	3:27
7.	"When the Night Falls"	7:55
8.	"I Died For You"	4:55
9.	"Invasion"	0:39
10.	"Motivation of Man"	1:32
11.	"Setian Massacre"	4:20
12.	"Stormrider"	4:13
13.	"Pure Evil"	6:00
14.	"Wolf"	5:48
15.	"Dark City"	5:46
16.	"Dracula"	5:59
17.	"Ten Thousand Strong"	4:00

Disk II
No.	Title	Length
1.	"Anthem"	4:47
2.	"Declaration Day"	4:23
3.	"Days of Rage"	3:07
4.	"Melancholy"	4:55
5.	"Encore Intro"	2:28
6.	"In Sacred Flames"	1:27
7.	"Boiling Point"	3:01
8.	"Damien"	9:54
9.	"Watching Over Me"	5:05
10.	"Dante's Inferno"	18:03
11.	"Iced Earth"	7:09
12.	"The Hunter"	5:42

== Personnel ==
Iced Earth

- Stu Block – lead vocals
- Jon Schaffer – rhythm and lead guitar, vocals
- Troy Seele – lead guitar
- Luke Appleton – bass, backing vocals
- Brent Smedley – drums

Production

- Jim Morris – engineer, mastering, mixing
- Nikolas Prokopiou – recording engineer
- Christodoulos Procopiou – recording engineer
- Felipe Machado Franco – artwork
- Nathan Perry – artwork
