= Into Eternity (album) =

Studio album by Into Eternity
- Released: 1999
- Recorded: May to October 1998
- Studio: Touchwood Studios, Regina, SK, Canada
- Genre: Progressive metal, melodic death metal
- Length: 43:16
- Label: Independent
- Producer: Into Eternity & Grant Hall

Into Eternity chronology
Into Eternity (1999)	Dead or Dreaming (2001)

Alternative cover
- DVS Records 2000 reissue

Professional ratings
Review scores
Source	Rating
Allmusic	link

Into Eternity is the debut studio album by the Canadian metal band Into Eternity. It was originally self-released by the band in 1999, then was re-released by DVS Records in 2000 with different cover art and one bonus track. The DVS version enlists Daniel Nargang (who would later share guitar and vocal duties with Tim Roth on the band's 2001 follow up Dead or Dreaming) on guitar instead of Chris Eisler. The album is intertwined with audio excerpts from the 1994 film Pulp Fiction.

== Track listing ==
- All songs written, performed and arranged by Into Eternity
- All lyrics written by Tim Roth
- All songs 1999 Into Eternity

No.	Title	Length
1.	"Torn"	5:31
2.	"Sorrow"	3:49
3.	"Left Behind"	3:15
4.	"The Modern Day"	4:53
5.	"A Frozen Escape"	3:50
6.	"Behind the Disguise"	4:15
7.	"Holding Onto Emptiness"	4:51
8.	"Into Eternity"	4:07
9.	"Speak of the Dead"	3:55
10.	"Silence Through Virtue" (Bonus track by DVS Records)	4:51

== Personnel ==
Credits are adapted from the album's liner notes.

Into Eternity

- Tim Roth – lead vocals, guitar
- Chris McDougall – keyboards
- Jim Austin – drums, vocals
- Scott Krall – bass, vocals
- Chris Eisler – guitar (on original release)
- Daniel Nargang – guitar (on 2000 re-release)

Production and other

- Recorded & Mixed – May to October 1998 at Touchwood Studios, Regina, SK, Canada
- Produced by Into Eternity and Grant Hall
- Mixed and Mastered by Grant (lick me where I ...) Hall and Into Eternity
- Artwork, Logo & Layout by Mattias Norén,
- Band photo by Brent Stevenson
