= DVS Records =

Record label

DVS Records is a Dutch independent record label, specializing in progressive metal and related music. It was founded in 2000 by Rene Janssen, a Dutch enthusiast of progressive rock and metal, and also one of the organizers of the ProgPower festival.
