= Bare Knuckle Pickups =

- Company type: Private
- Industry: Pickups
- Founded: 2003; 23 years ago
- Founder: Tim Mills
- Headquarters: England, UK
- Products: Pickups
- Number of employees: 18
- Website: www.bareknucklepickups.co.uk

Bare Knuckle Pickups (Bare Knuckle, or BKP) is a privately owned business based in the South West of England, UK, specialising in hand-wound electric guitar pickups. The company was founded in 2003 by Tim Mills, who had previously worked with Elkie Brooks and Iced Earth.

== Overview ==
Bare Knuckle produce a complete range of humbuckers, single coils, P-90, and other pickup varieties for both guitar and bass. These range from original vintage models to contemporary pickups such as 'The Mule' humbucker, 'Nailbomb' humbucker, 'Mississippi Queen' humbucker-size P90 and 'Apache' single coils.

Artists who have used the company's products include Propagandhi, Johnny Marr, Claudio Sanchez, Jon Schaffer, and Gabe Mangold. Additionally, several artists have signature pickups customized by BKP, including Misha Mansoor of Periphery's Juggernaut & Ragnarok model; Steve Stevens of Billy Idol's band's Rebel Yell model; Josh Smith of Northlane's Impulse model; Mike Stringer of Spiritbox's Halcyon model; and Rabea Massaad of Toska and Dorje's Silo model.

Bare Knuckle Pickups are also fitted by guitar manufacturers, such as Aristides Instruments, Fender Custom Shop, Ibanez Guitars, Manson Guitars, Blackmachine, and Peerless guitars.

== Awards ==
- Guitarist Magazine Gold award to 'The Mule' and 'Apache'
- Guitarist Magazine Guitarist Choice award to 'PG Blues Set'
- Musician's Hotline Golden M award to the 'Nailbomb'
- Total Guitar Best Buy to the 'Warpig'
