= Annihilator discography =

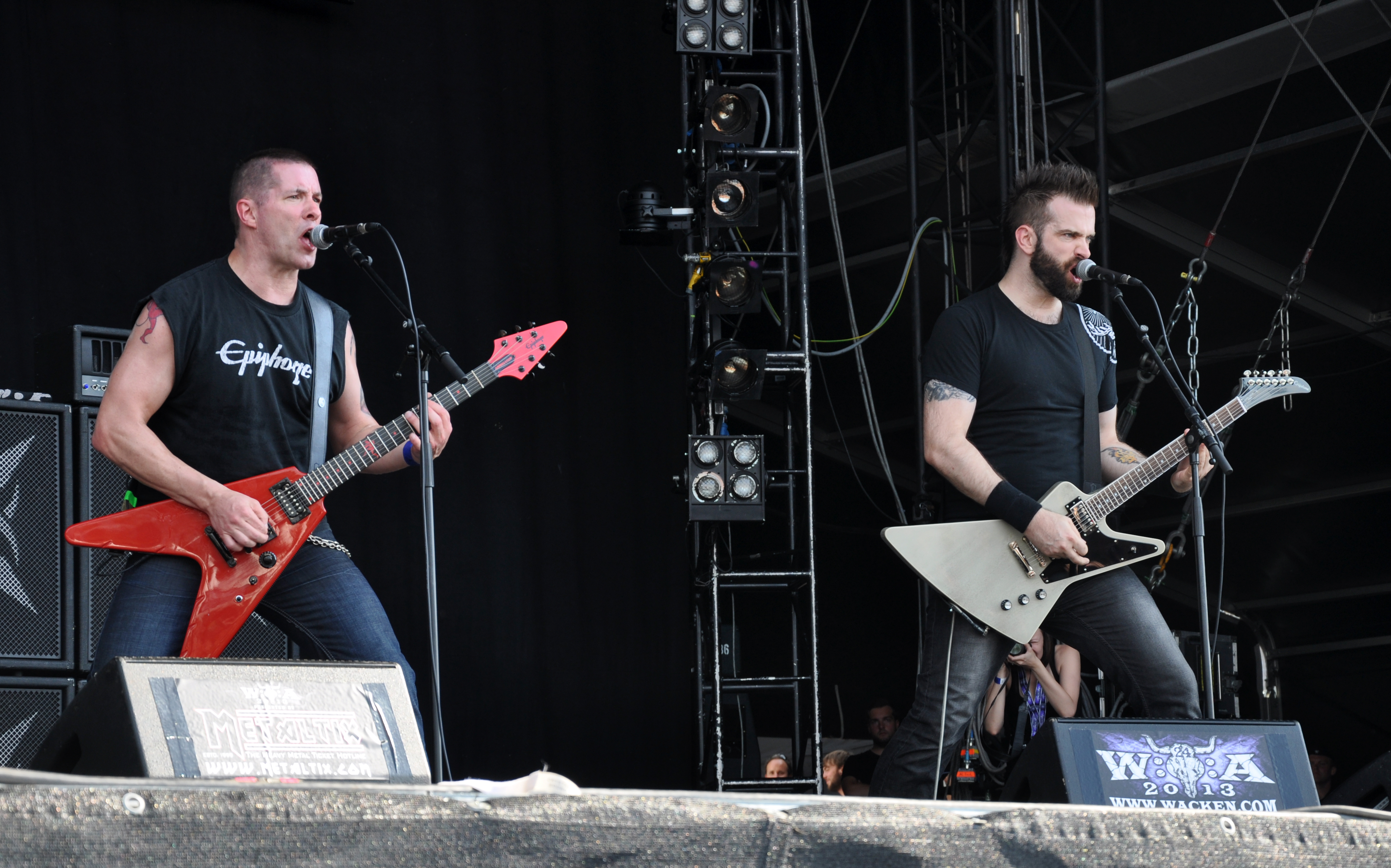
- Annihilator performing in 2013
- Studio albums: 17
- Extended plays: 1
- Live albums: 3
- Compilation albums: 3
- Singles: 18
- Video albums: 2
- Music videos: 10

The following is the discography of Annihilator, a Canadian thrash metal band founded in 1984 by guitarist, bassist, vocalist, songwriter and producer Jeff Waters, and former vocalist John Bates. They are the highest-selling heavy metal group from Canada, having sold more than three million albums worldwide, although most of their sales have been generated outside of the band's home country.

Since its inception, Annihilator has released seventeen studio albums and has undergone many line-up changes. Waters is the only remaining original member left in the band, and usually assembles touring musicians to perform with him. Annihilator's first two studio albums—Alice in Hell (1989) and Never, Neverland (1990)—are considered to be influential Canadian heavy metal records. Many of their later albums also received high praise from critics, and enjoyed some success in Europe and Japan. Their latest studio album, Ballistic, Sadistic, was released in 2020.

== Albums ==
=== Studio albums ===
Title	Album details	Peak chart positions								Sales
Title	Album details	JPN	GER	FRA	UK	FIN	SWI	BEL (FL)	BEL (WA)	Sales
Alice in Hell	Released: April 17, 1989; Label: Roadrunner; Format: CD, CS, LP, DL	—	—	—	—	—	—	—	—	
Never, Neverland	Released: July 1990; Label: Roadrunner; Format: CD, CS, LP, DL	—	—	—	48	—	—	—	—	
Set the World on Fire	Released: May 4, 1993; Label: Epic/Roadrunner; Format: CD, CS, LP, DL	47	79	—	—	—	—	—	—	
King of the Kill	Released: October 10, 1994; Label: Hypnotic/CMC International; Format: CD, CS, LP, DL	80	—	—	—	—	—	—	—	
Refresh the Demon	Released: March 11, 1996; Label: Music for Nations; Format: CD, CS, LP, DL	84	—	—	—	—	—	—	—	
Remains	Released: July 21, 1997; Label: CMC International; Format: CD, CS, LP, DL	—	—	—	—	—	—	—	—	
Criteria for a Black Widow	Released: June 1, 1999; Label: Roadrunner; Format: CD, CS, LP, DL	—	79	—	—	—	—	—	—	US: 2,591+
Carnival Diablos	Released: January 23, 2001; Label: Steamhammer Records; Format: CD, CS, LP	—	71	—	—	—	—	—	—	
Waking the Fury	Released: March 18, 2002; Label: SPV; Format: CD, CS, LP	—	—	—	—	—	—	—	—	
All for You	Released: October 26, 2004; Label: AFM; Format: CD, LP	179	—	—	—	—	—	—	—	
Schizo Deluxe	Released: November 8, 2005; Label: AFM; Format: CD, LP	183	—	—	—	—	—	—	—	US: 340+
Metal	Released: April 16, 2007; Label: SPV; Format: CD, LP, DL	96	—	190	—	—	—	—	—	
Annihilator	Released: May 17, 2010; Label: Earache Records; Format: CD, LP, DL	169	49	142	193	—	—	—	—	
Feast	Released: August 23, 2013; Label: UDR; Format: CD, LP, DL	145	20	102	156	17	36	180	101	US: 1,100+
Suicide Society	Released: September 18, 2015; Label: UDR; Format: CD, LP, DL	151	44	155	—	—	33	157	52	US: 1,000+
For the Demented	Released: November 3, 2017; Label: UDR; Format: CD, LP, DL	264	73	—	—	—	42	—	92	
Ballistic, Sadistic	Released: January 24, 2020; Label: Neverland Music Inc.; Format: CD, LP, DL	137	22	—	—	—	11	151	78	
"—" denotes a recording that did not chart or was not released in that territory.

=== Live albums ===
Title	Album details
In Command	Released: November 5, 1996; Label: The All Blacks B.V; Format: CD, CS, DL
Double Live Annihilation	Released: March 25, 2003; Label: AFM; Format: CD
Live at Masters of Rock	Released: October 30, 2009; Label: SPV; Format: CD, DVD, DL

=== Compilation albums ===
Title	Album details
Bag of Tricks	Released: July 21, 1994; Label: Far East Metal Syndicate; Format: CD
Total Annihilation	Released: September 22, 2010; Label: Earache; Format: free digital download
Triple Threat	Released: January 27, 2017; Label: UDR Music; Format: 2CD

== Extended plays ==
Title	Album details
The One	Released: April 26, 2004; Label: The All Blacks B.V; Format: LP

== Singles ==
Title	Year	Album
"Word Salad"	1989	Alice in Hell
"The Fun Palace	1990	Never, Neverland
"Stone Wall"	1991	Never, Neverland
"Never, Neverland"	1991	Never, Neverland
"Phoenix Rising"	1993	Set the World on Fire
"Set the World on Fire"	1993	Set the World on Fire
"Suicide Society"	2015	Suicide Society
"Creepin' Again (Parasomnia)"	2015	Suicide Society
"My Revenge"	2015	Suicide Society
"Snap"	2015	Suicide Society
"Sounds Good to Me (Acoustic)"	2017	Triple Threat
"Twisted Lobotomy"	2017	For the Demented
"One to Kill"	2017	For the Demented
"I Am Warfare"	2019	Ballistic, Sadistic
"Psycho Ward"	2019	Ballistic, Sadistic
"Armed to the Teeth"	2019	Ballistic, Sadistic
"Dressed Up for Evil"	2020	Ballistic, Sadistic
"Downright Dominate" (featuring Alexi Laiho, Dave Lombardo, Stu Block)	2021	Metal II

== Videos ==
=== Video albums ===
Title	Album details
Ten Years in Hell	Released: November 5, 2006; Label: The All Blacks B.V; Format: CD, DVD
Live at Masters of Rock	Released: October 30, 2009; Label: SPV; Format: CD, DVD, DL

=== Music videos ===
Year	Title	Directed
1989	"Alison Hell"	Dennis Dubeau
1990	"Stonewall"	Jeff Waters
1990	"The Fun Palace"	Wayne Darley
1993	"Set the World on Fire"	Thomas Mignone
1994	"King of the Kill"	—
1994	"21"	Jeff Waters
1994	"Only Be Lonely"	—
1996	"Syn. Kill 1"	—
2001	"Chicken and Corn"	—
2004	"All for You"	—
2013	"No Way Out"	Dale R. Hall
2015	"Suicide Society"	—
2015	"Snap"	—
2017	"Twisted Lobotomy"	—
2017	"For the Demented"	—
2019	"Psycho Ward"	—
2019	"Armed to the Teeth"	—
2020	"Dressed Up for Evil"	—
2021	"Downright Dominate" (featuring Alexi Laiho, Dave Lombardo, Stu Block)	—
2022	"Couple Suicide" (featuring Angela Gossow, Danko Jones (musician))	—
2022	"Romeo Delight" (featuring Dave Lombardo, Stu Block)	—
