= Feast (Annihilator album) =

Studio album by Annihilator
- Released: August 23, 2013 (Europe), August 27, 2013 (America)
- Recorded: Ottawa, Canada, January–April, 2013
- Genre: Thrash metal
- Length: 49:37
- Label: UDR
- Producer: Jeff Waters

Annihilator chronology
Annihilator (2010)	Feast (2013)	Suicide Society (2015)

Professional ratings
Review scores
Source	Rating
AllMusic	3/5 stars
Earshot.at	(6.5/7)
Jukebox:Metal	4/5 stars
Liverpool Sound and Vision	(2/5)
Lords of Metal	(91/100)

Feast is the fourteenth album by the Canadian heavy metal band Annihilator, released on August 23, 2013, by UDR in Europe and August 27, 2013, in North America. The cover art of the album features Spanish model and presenter Pilar Rubio.

The album is the final to feature vocalist Dave Padden, who parted ways with the band at the end of 2014, ending his decade-plus long tenure. The decision came after Padden became fed up with Annihilator's rigorous touring schedule that followed the album's release, leaving him wanting to spend more time with his family.

== Track listing ==
Standard edition

All lyrics are written by Jeff Waters except where noted; all music is composed by Jeff Waters.

No.	Title	Length
1.	"Deadlock" (lyrics by Dave Padden)	4:22
2.	"No Way Out"	5:19
3.	"Smear Campaign"	4:14
4.	"No Surrender"	5:37
5.	"Wrapped" (lyrics by Danko Jones)	3:47
6.	"Perfect Angel Eyes"	4:26
7.	"Demon Code"	6:22
8.	"Fight the World"	6:54
9.	"One Falls, Two Rise"	8:34

Bonus disc - Re-kill
The deluxe ECO-book version is set to feature a bonus disc, featuring re-recordings of 15 of the band's most well-known songs (in addition to a 3D cover) from prior to Dave Padden being Annihilator's vocalist. Jeff Waters stated in an interview that the inspiration for the re-recordings was based on the fact that many of Annihilator's current fans ("more than 50%") are kids between the ages of 18 and 25 years. Many in this age group, according to Waters, either are unaware of or else have had trouble obtaining Annihilator's earlier records. Hence, the re-recordings are designed to bring Annihilator's earlier material to the newer generation of Annihilator fans.

Bonus disc - Re-kill
No.	Title	Writer(s)	Length
1.	"Fun Palace (originally from Never, Neverland)"		5:35
2.	"Alison Hell (originally from Alice in Hell)"	Waters, John Bates	5:09
3.	"King of the Kill (originally from King of the Kill)"		3:15
4.	"Never, Neverland (originally from Never, Neverland)"		5:23
5.	"Set the World on Fire (originally from Set the World on Fire)"	Waters, Coburn Pharr	4:25
6.	"W.T.Y.D. (Welcome To Your Death) (originally from Alice in Hell)"	Bates, Waters	4:10
7.	"No Zone (originally from Set the World on Fire)"		2:50
8.	"Bloodbath (originally from Criteria for a Black Widow)"	Waters, Bates	5:25
9.	"21 (originally from King of the Kill)"		4:24
10.	"Stonewall (originally from Never, Neverland)"		4:51
11.	"Ultra-Motion (originally from Waking the Fury)"		5:07
12.	"Time Bomb (originally from Carnival Diablos)"	Waters, Joe Comeau	4:33
13.	"Refresh the Demon (originally from Refresh the Demon)"	Waters, Randy Black	5:29
14.	"Word Salad (originally from Alice in Hell)"		5:46
15.	"Brain Dance (originally from Set the World on Fire)"	Waters, Pharr	4:51

German Bonus DVD (includes all 3 discs)
No.	Title	Writer(s)	Length
1.	"Smear Campaign"		5:06
2.	"King of the Kill"	Waters, Bates	4:36
3.	"No Way Out"		5:34
4.	"Clown Parade"		5:25
5.	"Set the World on Fire"	Waters, Pharr	4:43
6.	"Welcome to Your Death"	Bates, Waters	5:05
7.	"Funpalace"		6:04
8.	"I Am in Command"		5:09
9.	"No Zone"		3:18
10.	"Fiasco"		5:13
11.	"Alison Hell"	Bates, Waters	6:44

== Personnel ==
- Jeff Waters - guitars, bass and backing vocals
- Dave Padden - lead/backing vocals, guitars
- Mike Harshaw - drums
- Alberto Campuzano - bass (not on the album)
- Danko Jones - lead vocals on "Wrapped"

== Chart positions ==
Chart (2013)	Peak position
Belgian Albums (Ultratop Wallonia)	200
Finnish Albums (Suomen virallinen lista)	17
German Albums (Offizielle Top 100)	20
Swiss Albums (Schweizer Hitparade)	36
