= Stress Factor 9 =

- Origin: Vancouver, British Columbia, Canada
- Genres: Thrash metal, punk
- Years active: 2005–2007
- Label: Century Media
- Past members: Kick; Duane Chaos; Frank Fright; Ray Hartmann; Randy Rampage; Stuart Carruthers; Ash Blue; Anthony Greenham; Markus McCallum
- Website: stressfactor9.com

Stress Factor 9 was a Canadian thrash metal band from Vancouver, formed in 2005. SF9's members include frontman Randy Rampage (founder of the hardcore band D.O.A., and singer of thrash metal band Annihilator.) and drummer Ray Hartmann (also of Annihilator.) with guitarist Kick (Vertical After), and their most recent lineup included Frank Frightful (of Singapore punk legends Opposition Party), and Duane Chaos (22nd Century).

The band has one CD (Brainwarp Mindspin) and last played in January 2007. They have not performed since the last ill-fated tour to Philadelphia which left Frank Fright, Duane Chaos and Kick stranded in the middle of the winter when Randy Rampage and Ray Hartmann were refused entry into the United States. The band ended up cancelling six shows immediately including several sold out shows with Overkill in Virginia. Since that tour, the band has not played publicly as Kick pursued a career in USA political organizing.

== History ==
Randy Rampage and Ray Hartmann first worked together on Canadian thrash metal band Annihilator's million selling debut Alice in Hell album, which received critical acclaim and that band toured extensively, especially Europe. Randy split acrimoniously from that band, and Ray left two albums later. The two rejoined Annihilator ten years later for 1999's Criteria for a Black Widow, but again Randy split, and one album later, Ray did as well.

In 2005, Guitarist and songwriter Kick of the indie band Vertical After formed Stress Factor 9 with Rampage and Hartmann, for a style meshing thrash metal with more of the punk simplicity and attitude that suited Rampage's roots with D.O.A.. The band was formed and recorded demos with bassist Stuart Carruthers of Grip Inc. (Dave Lombardo from Slayer's band), and Ash Blue from the earliest lineup of Strapping Young Lad. To complete the full-length album and live concert tours that would follow, Stuart and Ash would be replaced with former Vertical After bassist Markus McCallum (who had just finished work with Gene Hoglan's band Mechanism), and on guitar Singapore punk music star Frank Frightful.

The CD Brainwarp Mindspin was produced by Shaun Thingvold (Fear Factory, Strapping Young Lad, Lamb of God, Bif Naked) and recorded at Greenhouse Studios, where Nickelback recorded several hit albums. Lyricist Big John Bates and guitarist Anthony Greenham, both involved in the Annihilator's Alice in Hell album, contributed to the SF9 album. The CD was distributed by Century Media in the USA, and their partner CM Distro in Europe.

After some North American tour dates, the band joined Armored Saint for European tour shows.

== Discography ==
2006: Brainwarp Mindspin
