= Bag of Tricks =

Compilation album by Annihilator
- Released: Original: 1994; Reissue: November 26, 2002
- Recorded: 1989–1994
- Genres: Thrash metal Heavy metal
- Length: 74:55
- Label: Attic / Roadrunner
- Producers: Jeff Waters, Glen Robinson

Annihilator chronology
| Set the World on Fire (1993) | Bag of Tricks (1994) | King of the Kill (1994) |

Professional ratings
Review scores
| Source | Rating |
|---|---|
| Allmusic | 3/5 stars |

Bag of Tricks is a compilation album by the band Annihilator, released in 1994. The album was later reissued in 2002 under the label Roadrunner.

== Track listing ==
| No. | Title | Writer(s) | Length |
|---|---|---|---|
| 1. | "Alison Hell" (Remastered Version) | Jeff Waters, John Bates | 5:03 |
| 2. | "Phantasmagoria" (Demo version) | Waters | 3:57 |
| 3. | "Back to the Crypt" | Waters | 4:09 |
| 4. | "Gallery" | Waters, Bates | 4:08 |
| 5. | "Human Insecticide" (Live) | Waters, Bates | 5:44 |
| 6. | "The Fun Palace" (Extended Mix) | Waters, Coburn Pharr | 6:22 |
| 7. | "W.T.Y.D." (Live) | Waters, Bates | 4:58 |
| 8. | "Word Salad" (Live) | Waters | 6:36 |
| 9. | "Live Wire" (Live) | Angus Young, Malcolm Young, Bon Scott | 5:16 |
| 10. | "Knight Jumps Queen" (Demo version) | Waters | 3:46 |
| 11. | "Fantastic Things" | Waters, Wayne Darley | 4:27 |
| 12. | "Bats in the Belfry" (Demo version) | Waters, Ray Hartmann, Pharr | 3:44 |
| 13. | "Evil Appetite" | Waters, Neil Goldberg, Pharr | 3:40 |
| 14. | "Gallery" (86) | Waters, Bates | 4:00 |
| 15. | "Alison Hell" (86) | Waters, Bates | 5:09 |
| 16. | "Phantasmagoria" (86) | Waters | 3:56 |
| Total length: | | | 74:55 |

== Notes ==
- Track 1 – The vocal tracks for "Alison Hell" were first recorded by Dennis Dubeau, but he was thought to be too melodic and was replaced by Randy Rampage shortly after signing with Roadrunner Records. Dennis can still be heard in the song at the bridge ("Sitting in the corner..."). This version is remastered with the bass pumped up to give it a heavier sound.
- Tracks 2–4 – Tracks from a three-song pre-production demo made in December 1989. This especially rare version of "Phantasmagoria" is one of the last three Annihilator songs recorded by Randy Rampage and does not appear on "Never, Neverland". "Back to the Crypt" is a reworked version from the first demo with new lyrics and sounds. Jeff felt it did not fit the newer material currently being written and did not make the "Never, Neverland" album, although the opening and middle solos were used in the song "Never, Neverland". The only part of "Gallery" to make it to the "Never, Neverland" album is the intro which became part of the song "Never, Neverland".
- Track 5 – Recorded live with Randy Rampage on vocals during the 1989 tour of "Alice in Hell" and originally released on "Thrash The Wall" compilation. This version is remixed with more power than even the studio version.
- Track 6 – This is how the song was originally written and recorded which extends the length by 0:30 over the album version. One edit was made before the opening verse and two more to the riff right before the chorus.
- Tracks 7–9 – Recorded in the fall of 1990 in San Antonio Texas. Vocals by Coburn Pharr. Tracks 7 & 8 Previously released on the "Stonewall Single" and track 9 is previously unreleased.
- Tracks 10–11 – Part of a three-song pre-production demo from June 1991. This version of "Knight Jumps Queen" has Coburn Pharr on vocals and was the first time it was put on tape, but was re-recorded with Aaron Randall's vocals for "Set the World on Fire". The bassist Wayne Darley handles vocals on "Fantastic Things" with Neil Goldberg making his Annihilator debut on this recording. The song was re-recorded for "Set the World on Fire" and was later discarded for "Snake in the Grass". The third track on the demo was "Phoenix Rising".
- Tracks 12–13 – Recorded in December 1991. These two songs were rough mixed with Coburn Pharr on vocals, along with "The Edge", so they could be played while hiring a new vocalist. Except for the drums, all tracks were re-recorded with new vocalist Aaron Randall in June 1992. "Evil Appetite" was renamed to "Passing By" with new lyrics for the bridge and the homeless bum intro was discarded. Then at the last minute the name was changed again to "Don't Bother Me".
- Tracks 14–16 – Recorded in 1986 in Jeff's basement with Jeff on vocals. These are part of the original 4 song demo that got Annihilator their first record deal. Some of Jeff's vocals can still be heard on the Album version of "Alison Hell". These original recordings were made on a Fostek four track and the recordings here were from Jeff's TDK Cassette Master. "Ligeia", from this demo, could not be included because of time restrictions.

== Credits ==
- Jeff Waters – Guitar, Vocals on tracks 14–16, Bass on track 1, 14–16, Background Vocals
- Randy Rampage – Vocals on tracks 1–5
- Coburn Pharr – Vocals on tracks 6–10, 12–13
- Dave Scott Davis – Guitar on tracks 5–9
- Neil Goldberg – Guitar on tracks 10–13
- Wayne Darley – Bass, Vocals on track 11
- Ray Hartmann – Drums
- Mike Mangini – Drums on tracks 12–13
- Paul Malek – Drums on tracks 14–16
