= Double Live Annihilation =

Live album by Annihilator
- Released: March 25th, 2003
- Recorded: 2002
- Genre: Thrash metal, heavy metal
- Length: 91:30
- Label: AFM
- Producer: Jeff Waters

Annihilator chronology
| Waking the Fury (2002) | Double Live Annihilation (2003) | All for You (2004) |

Double Live Annihilation is the second official live album by the band Annihilator, released in 2003.

== Track listing ==
All tracks are written by Jeff Waters, except where noted.

Disc I
| No. | Title | Writer(s) | Length |
|---|---|---|---|
| 1. | "Murder" | | 4:35 |
| 2. | "Ultra-Motion" | | 5:17 |
| 3. | "The Box" | | 4:55 |
| 4. | "Denied" | Joe Comeau, Waters | 5:39 |
| 5. | "The Blackest Day" | Comeau, Waters | 5:36 |
| 6. | "King of the Kill" | John Bates, Waters | 3:58 |
| 7. | "Torn" | Comeau, Waters | 5:34 |
| 8. | "Lunatic Asylum" | Comeau, Waters | 6:23 |

Disc II
| No. | Title | Writer(s) | Length |
|---|---|---|---|
| 1. | "Set the World on Fire" | Coburn Pharr, Waters | 4:54 |
| 2. | "I Am in Command" | | 4:12 |
| 3. | "Refresh the Demon" | Randy Black, Waters | 5:35 |
| 4. | "Syn. Kill 1" | | 4:53 |
| 5. | "Never, Neverland" | | 5:44 |
| 6. | "Striker" | | 5:19 |
| 7. | "Bliss" | | 1:10 |
| 8. | "Phantasmagoria" | | 4:44 |
| 9. | "Crystal Ann" | | 2:06 |
| 10. | "Alison Hell" | Bates, Waters | 5:49 |
| 11. | "Shallow Grave" | Comeau, Waters | 6:07 |

== Personnel ==
- Joe Comeau – vocals
- Jeff Waters – guitar
- Curran Murphy – guitar
- Russ Bergquist – bass
- Randy Black – drums
