= Vertical After =

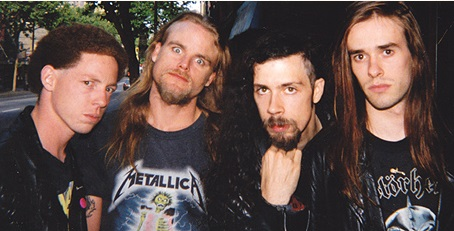

Background information
- Origin: British Columbia, Canada; Seattle, WA
- Genres: Heavy Metal; Punk
- Years active: 1989–2003
- Label: Cargo Records
- Spinoffs: Stress Factor 9
- Members: Kick; Keith; Sol
- Past members: Munesh Sami; Hart Schiess; Stewart Langille; Markus McCallum; Odd Noxious
- Website: verticalafter.com

Vertical After was a thrash metal/pop punk band based in Canada and the United States. The band was notable for their elaborate videos that aired on Canada's Much Music nationwide music television station. The band recorded four albums.

They spent much of the period between 1989 and 2003 performing in clubs in the United States, Canada and Europe. Vertical After toured North America promoting their videos and albums including 1999's Pop Goes Death, mixed by Doug Pinnick of King's X, and 2002's Bloody Murdo, co-produced by Stuart Carruthers of Grip Inc. They were the opening act for Twisted Sister in New York, Iron Maiden's lead vocalist Bruce Dickinson in Los Angeles, Ice-T's Body Count and other acts including King's X.

The band received positive and mixed reviews for their music. After the band's hiatus in 2003, Kick and Markus McCallum formed Stress Factor 9 with members of the band Annihilator, including Randy Rampage.

== History ==
Vertical After developed and performed in the Vancouver and Seattle area during the late 1980s and early 1990s, when the peak of thrash metal intersected with the grunge movement that would later eclipse it. Kick (guitar, vocals) formed Vertical After with his friend, Stewart Langille, (guitar, vocals) and immediately played at concert/club shows in Seattle, Vancouver and Los Angeles.

Their second Los Angeles tour ended after an automobile accident that led to the hospitalization of all four band members and the driver of their vehicle. The band was recording its first album and getting airplay of its first music video on Canada's Much Music channel plus regional and cable shows in the USA. The band issued an all-video, 10-song VHS album, with songs filmed by rising cinematographers including Dan Nowak (Outer Limits, Dead Like Me), Marcus Rogers (Strapping Young Lad), and Gary Davis (Sublime: Three Ring Circus). The band was featured in an article in The Province.

During the mid-1990s, Vertical After toured Europe, the US and Canada. Playing at various metal festivals, they supported Dee Snider, Bruce Dickinson, Green Day, Ice-T's Body Count, King's X, and Motörhead. The band released their second album Powered By Crime (1995) including samplers from the Foundations Forum convention. The band received TV news coverage in Las Vegas in 1996 when guitarist Stewart was hit by a taxi and critically injured.

In 1998, founding member Stewart Langille, died. Bassist Markus McCallum joined another band. Vertical After's remaining members, Kick (guitar, vocals) and Keith (drums), re-organized the band with Hart (guitar) and Sol (bass, vocals) and recorded Pop Goes Death (1999). The band also put out Bloody Murdo (2002) before doing a tour as a support act for King's X. The final tour lineup featured Munesh Sami, (Hank Williams III and Strapping Young Lad).

In 2003, the band semi-retired following the death of guitarist Hart.

In 2015, the band released a DVD called The Whole Kick and Kaboodle featuring 20 song videos and extras.

== Discography ==
- 1994: Foundations Forum '94
- 1996: Powered by Crime
  1999: Pop goes Death
- 2002: Bloody Murdo
- 2015: The Whole Kick and Kaboodle (DVD)
