= Iron Works =

An ironworks or iron works is a building or site where iron is smelted and where heavy iron and steel products are made.

Iron Works may also refer to:

- Iron Works, a neighborhood in Brookfield, Connecticut
- Clay City, Kentucky, known as Iron Works during the early 19th century
- Iron Works, the label that produced Liege Lord
