= For the Demented =

Studio album by Annihilator
- Released: November 3, 2017 (international edition); December 20, 2017 (Japanese edition)
- Recorded: 2017
- Studio: Watersound Studios Inc., Dunrobin, Ottawa, Canada
- Genre: Thrash metal
- Length: 48:12
- Label: Neverland Music/Silver Lining Music (international edition); Avalon (Japanese edition)
- Producer: Jeff Waters; Rich Gray

Annihilator chronology
Triple Threat (2017)	For the Demented (2017)	Ballistic, Sadistic (2020)

For the Demented is the sixteenth studio album by Canadian thrash metal band Annihilator, released on November 3, 2017.

== Background and production ==
Over a year after the release of Suicide Society (2015), Annihilator began working on a follow-up album. Founding member and guitarist Jeff Waters told Metal Wani in December 2016:

"On the next one, the changes I'm gonna make… I only said two things. I've got all these people telling me, 'You've gotta go back to this album,' or that album, or that album, or that album. 'You've gotta do this,' 'You've gotta do that.' So what I do is I block it out. But I've decided that I'm going to not worry about catchy, commercial choruses — 'commercial,' as in you remember it, where you intentionally make that chorus the most important part of the song and you want people to remember that one every time. That kind of is the opposite of what I used to do in the earlier days. In the earlier days, I would go, 'I don't care about the chorus being the main part; I want the whole song to be cool.' So therefore the choruses were not as commercial or catchy. And they remained heavy back then; the choruses would end up being heavy. Whereas on my Suicide Society record I just did, you could have a heavy song, but then you hit the chorus and you go, 'Woah, that's pretty mainstream stuff in the choruses.' And the other thing was, since I'm such a fan of so many bands, I let myself go a little bit on the last album with being too blatantly obvious with my influences and my musical loves as a fan. So you really heard a song that had a lot of the Master of Puppets era of music from Metallica, and you really heard a Megadeth-y song on there, and you really heard in my vocals some Hetfield and Mustaine-isms. And I think that was great, as a fan, to get it out, but I think I need to do more of my own thing on the next record."

In February 2017, Waters said that the sixteenth Annihilator studio album was being co-produced by bassist Rich Gray (formerly Hinks), making it the "first time I've actually had somebody else in the studio since 1990 (Never, Neverland) working with me on stuff." On September 12, 2017, it was announced that the album, now titled For the Demented, would be released on November 3; more details on the album, including track listing and artwork, and the music video for "Twisted Lobotomy" were released on the same day. In support of For the Demented, Annihilator (along with Death Angel) opened for Testament on the European Brotherhood of the Snake tour, which took place in November and December 2017.

== Track listing ==
All lyrics are written by Jeff Waters; all music is composed by Waters and Rich Gray (formerly Hinks), except "Dark" composed by Waters

No.	Title	Length
1.	"Twisted Lobotomy"	4:44
2.	"One to Kill"	4:43
3.	"For the Demented"	5:22
4.	"Pieces of You"	6:10
5.	"The Demon You Know"	4:43
6.	"Phantom Asylum"	6:14
7.	"Altering the Altar"	5:05
8.	"The Way"	3:18
9.	"Dark" (instrumental)	2:09
10.	"Not All There"	5:42
Total length:		48:10

== Personnel ==
Credits are adapted from the album's liner notes.

Annihilator

- Jeff Waters − vocals, guitars, bass, drum programming
- Aaron Homma − lead guitar (track 2), backing vocals

Additional musicians

- Dan Beehler − backing vocals

Production

- Jeff Waters − production, recording, mixing, editing, mastering
- Rich Gray − co-producer
- Gyula Havancsák − cover art, artwork, layout, design
- Jasmina Vrcko – photography

== Charts ==
Chart (2017)	Peak position
Belgian Albums (Ultratop Wallonia)	92
German Albums (Offizielle Top 100)	73
Swiss Albums (Schweizer Hitparade)	42
