= Live at Masters of Rock =

Live album by Annihilator
- Released: October 30, 2009
- Recorded: Masters of Rock Festival, Vizovice, Czech Republic, 11 July 2008
- Genres: Thrash metal, heavy metal
- Length: 70 min.
- Label: SPV/Steamhammer
- Director: The Campbell Bros.
- Producer: Jeff Waters

Annihilator chronology
Metal (2007)	Live at Masters of Rock (2009)	Annihilator (2010)

Professional ratings
Review scores
Source	Rating
Allmusic	4/5 stars
Metal Hammer	5/7

Live at Masters of Rock is an official live video album by the Canadian heavy metal band Annihilator, recorded at the Masters of Rock Festival 2008 in Vizovice, Czech Republic, and released in 2009. The concert footage was released on a live DVD and a live CD was originally intended to be included as bonus tracks. The audio recordings, because of record label SPV's insolvency problems, were instead made into a live album. Halfway through the recording some cameras were turned off which resulted in clips from earlier songs having to be put in to fill the gaps.

== Track listing ==
No.	Title	Length
1.	"Crystal Ann"	1:49
2.	"King of the Kill"	4:43
3.	"The Blackest Day"	5:24
4.	"Operation Annihilation"	6:02
5.	"Clown Parade"	4:47
6.	"Set the World on Fire"	5:17
7.	"I Am in Command"	4:41
8.	"Never, Neverland"	5:38
9.	"Fun Palace"	5:39
10.	"Phantasmagoria"	5:07
11.	"W.T.Y.D"	5:09
12.	"Wicked Mystic"	4:33
13.	"Alison Hell"	6:53
14.	"Shallow Grave"	7:05

== Personnel ==
- Jeff Waters – guitar, vocals
- Dave Padden – guitar, vocals
- Dave Sheldon – bass
- Ryan Ahoff – drums
