= In Command =

In Command may refer to:

- In Command (album), a 1996 live album by Annihilator
- In Command (horse), a racehorse
- "In Command" (song), a 1993 song by Rob'n'Raz
