= Trick Bag (disambiguation) =

Trick Bag is a 1976 album by the Meters.

Trick Bag may also refer to:

- "Trick Bag", an Earl King single covered on the aforementioned album and for which it is named
- "Trick Bag", a song by Don Patterson from the 1966 album Goin' Down Home
- Trick bag, another name for mojo bag in Mojo (African-American culture)
- tRICK bAG, Japanese blues & New Orleans R&B band led by Takashi "Hotoke" Nagai
- Trickbag, Swedish blues band formed in 1994
- Luther Kent & Trick Bag, blues & New Orleans R&B band led by Luther Kent

== See also ==
Bag of Tricks
