= The Blackest Day =

The Blackest Day may refer to:

- "The Blackest Day" (Annihilator song), a song by Annihilator on their 2002 album Waking the Fury
- "The Blackest Day" (Lana Del Rey song), a song by Lana Del Rey on her 2015 album Honeymoon
