= Doctor Psycho (disambiguation) =

Doctor Psycho is a DC Comics character.

Doctor Psycho or Dr. Psycho may also refer to:

- "Doctor Psycho" (Orange Is the New Black), a 2016 television episode
- Dr. Psycho – Die Bösen, die Bullen, meine Frau und ich, a 2007–2008 German television series
- "Doctor Psycho", a 2004 song by Annihilator from All for You
