= Randy Rampage =

Canadian singer and bassist (1960–2018)

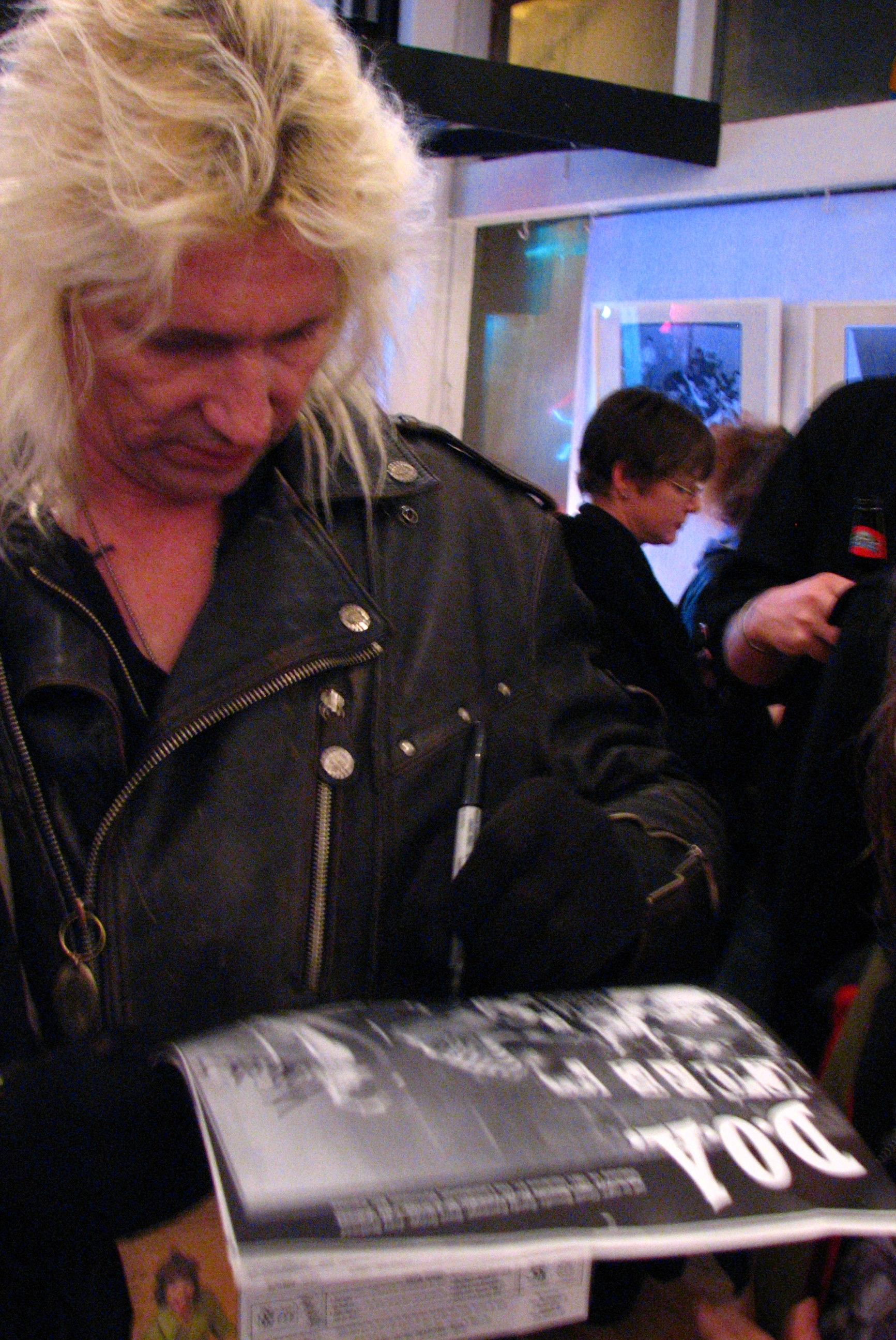
- Randy Rampage in 2007 at an art exhibit

Background information
- Born: Randall Desmond Archibald; February 21, 1960; Vancouver, British Columbia, Canada
- Died: August 14, 2018 (aged 58) Vancouver, British Columbia, Canada
- Genres: Hardcore punk, thrash metal
- Occupations: Singer, musician
- Instruments: Vocals, bass
- Years active: 1977–2018
- Website: randyrampage.com

Randall Desmond Archibald (February 21, 1960 – August 14, 2018), better known by his stage name Randy Rampage, was a Canadian musician and founding member, bass player and vocalist of the hardcore band D.O.A., often referred to as the "founders" of hardcore punk.

He was also the lead singer of the thrash metal band Annihilator in 1988–1989 and again from 1998 to 2000.

== Career ==
Originally a drummer, Rampage switched to bass and played on D.O.A.'s seminal early punk albums Something Better Change and Hardcore '81. Rampage was fired from D.O.A. after a December 31, 1981 New Year's Eve show. Rampage was the vocalist for the Canadian speed metal/thrash metal band Annihilator. He first joined the band in 1988, appearing on their debut album Alice in Hell (1989), and was fired after its accompanying tour; Rampage claimed this was because he "beat up" band lead Jeff Waters. Around 1998, Rampage returned to Annihilator and recorded Criteria for a Black Widow (1999) with them. He then left once again to rejoin D.O.A, playing on their 2002 Win the Battle album, only to leave the band again. He rejoined D.O.A. in 2005, remained in the lineup through 2008 and was featured on their album, Northern Avenger, produced by Bob Rock. On the eve of the Northern Avenger tour, it was announced that Rampage was leaving D.O.A. once again.

Rampage recorded a self-titled EP in 1982, Randy Rampage. It featured musicians also known as the Sick Ones: Chuck Biscuits, Brad Kent, Zippy Pinhead, and Benny Doro.

Randy appeared in Susanne Tabata's documentary film Bloodied But Unbowed, a historical look at the birth of the Vancouver punk rock scene and the development of hardcore punk on the west coast of North America during the 1978–1983 timeframe.

Randy Rampage had many other projects, including Rampage, Stress Factor 9, Fake It Big Time, Ground Zero, Iron Gypsy, Requiem, Riff Raff, and The 45s. Rampage's last project was Rampage, a band that included Duane Chaos (born Duane Nickull), The Great Baldini, Brent Johnson, Tim Bitz, Pinto Stiletto. Their LP was recorded by John Webster, but was unreleased at the time of his death.

== Death ==
Rampage died on August 14, 2018, at his home in Vancouver from an apparent heart attack, aged 58.

== Discography ==
D.O.A.

- Something Better Change (1980)
- Hardcore '81 (1981)
- Win the Battle (2002)
- Northern Avenger (2008)

Annihilator

- Alice in Hell (1989)
- Bag of Tricks (1994)
- In Command (1996)
- Criteria for a Black Widow (1999)
- Total Annihilation (2010)

Stress Factor 9

- Brainwarp Mindspin (2006)

Randy Rampage

- Randy Rampage EP (1982)
