= Triple Threat (Annihilator album) =

Compilation album by Annihilator
- Released: January 27, 2017
- Recorded: May–June 2016
- Genres: Thrash metal, acoustic
- Length: 257 minutes
- Label: UDR Music
- Producers: Jeff Waters, Rich Hinks, Marty Sobb

Annihilator chronology
Suicide Society (2015)	Triple Threat (2017)	For the Demented (2017)

Triple Threat is a box set by Canadian thrash metal band Annihilator, released on January 27, 2017. It consists of a studio album solely featuring acoustic versions of many of the band's songs from over the years, a live CD featuring their set from the Bang Your Head!!! festival in 2016 and special editions feature a live DVD or Blu-ray.

Whereas Jeff Waters is known for recording all studio guitar and bass for Annihilator records himself, Waters said of this album: "This was one of the coolest things I have done in my long career. Having five people in a room, from all different backgrounds and talents, coming together to play songs from the past and to try to sound like we are one but totally live."

== Track listing ==
=== Disc 1 ===
Live at the Bang Your Head!!! Festival
No.	Title	Length
1.	"King of the Kill"	5:58
2.	"No Way Out"	5:57
3.	"Creepin' Again"	5:46
4.	"Set the World on Fire"	4:58
5.	"W.T.Y.D. (Welcome to Your Death)"	5:00
6.	"Never, Neverland"	6:46
7.	"Bliss"	1:29
8.	"Second to None"	5:55
9.	"Refresh the Demon"	5:58
10.	"Alison Hell"	6:53
11.	"Phantasmagoria"	5:28

=== Disc 2 ===
Unplugged: The Watersound Studios Sessions
No.	Title	Length
1.	"Sounds Good to Me"	5:56
2.	"Bad Child"	4:03
3.	"Innocent Eyes"	4:20
4.	"Snake in the Grass"	5:54
5.	"Fantastic Things"	5:01
6.	"Holding On"	4:10
7.	"Stonewall"	5:48
8.	"In the Blood"	4:27
9.	"Crystal Ann"	2:07
10.	"Phoenix Rising"	3:55

=== Bonus live DVD/Blu-ray ===
No.	Title	Length
1.	"Chapter I: "Annihilator Un-Plugged: The Watersound Studios Sessions"	44:57
2.	"Chapter II: "Annihilator Live At The Bang Your Head Festival"	59:05
3.	"Chapter III: "Annihilator Summer Mini-Documentary 2016"	58:33
4.	"Bonus Material: "Jeff Waters' Commentary On The Watersound Studios Sessions"	27:27

== Personnel ==
Musicians

- Jeff Waters – vocals, lead and rhythm guitar on all tracks
- Aaron Homma – rhythm guitar on all tracks
- Rich Hinks – bass on all tracks
- Fabio Alessandrini – drums on live tracks
- Marc LaFrance – vocals and drums on acoustic tracks
- Pat Robillard – guitar on acoustic tracks

Audio production

Live at the Bang Your Head Festival

- Jeff Waters – mixing, mastering
- Arne Lakenmacher – sound recording

Unplugged: The Watersound Studios Sessions

- Jeff Waters – recording, mixing, mastering
- Rich Hinks – recording
- Marty Sobb – recording
- Kyle Herrick – tape op
