= Schizo Deluxe =

Studio album by Annihilator
- Released: November 8, 2005
- Recorded: 2005
- Studio: Watersound Studios, Ottawa, Canada: Coldryche Studios, Nepean, Canada (drums)
- Genre: Thrash metal
- Length: 61:10
- Label: AFM
- Producer: Jeff Waters

Annihilator chronology
All for You (2004)	Schizo Deluxe (2005)	Metal (2007)

Professional ratings
Review scores
Source	Rating
AllMusic	3.5/5 stars
Blabbermouth	8.5/10
Classic Rock	8/10 stars
Rock Hard	9.0/10

Schizo Deluxe is the eleventh studio album by Canadian heavy metal band Annihilator, released on November 8, 2005, by AFM Records.

== Track listing ==
All tracks are written by Jeff Waters, except "Pride" by Waters and Dave Padden.

No.	Title	Length
1.	"Maximum Satan"	4:36
2.	"Drive"	4:58
3.	"Warbird"	4:41
4.	"Plasma Zombies"	4:45
5.	"Invite It"	4:57
6.	"Like Father, Like Gun"	4:19
7.	"Pride"	4:56
8.	"Too Far Gone"	4:23
9.	"Clare"	6:46
10.	"Something Witchy"	5:22

Bonus tracks
No.	Title	Length
11.	"Weapon X"	3:32
12.	"I Am in Command" (1990 Demo)	3:52
13.	"Annihilator" (1985 Radio Ottawa Demo)	4:01

== Credits ==
- Jeff Waters – guitars, bass, lead vocals on "Too Far Gone"
- Dave Padden – vocals
- Tony Chappelle – drums, backing vocals (tracks 1, 3, 6, 9)

Guest/Session

- Sean Brophy – backing vocals (tracks 1, 3, 6, 9)
- Dan Beehler – backing vocals (tracks 1, 3, 6, 9), End Scream (track 7)
- Verena Baumgardt – backing vocals (track 5)
- Kathy Waters – backing vocals (track 5)
- Altan (de Paris) Zia – additional vocals (track 10)

Miscellaneous staff

- Jeff Waters – producer, engineering
- Chris Coldrick – mixing, mastering
- Gyula Havancsák – cover art, design
