= King of the Kill =

Studio album by Annihilator
- Released: October 10, 1994
- Recorded: 1994
- Studio: Watersound Studios, Maple Ridge, Canada
- Genre: Heavy metal; thrash metal
- Length: 49:29
- Label: Hypnotic/CMC International
- Producer: Jeff Waters

Annihilator chronology
Bag of Tricks (1994)	King of the Kill (1994)	Refresh the Demon (1996)

Professional ratings
Review scores
Source	Rating
AllMusic	4/5 stars
Rock Hard	9.0/10 stars

King of the Kill is the fourth album by Canadian heavy metal band Annihilator, released in 1994. This was the first Annihilator album not released on Roadrunner Records, and marked a return to the thrash metal sound of their earlier albums, Alice in Hell and Never, Neverland, after the commercial failure of its predecessor Set the World on Fire, while also retaining some of that album's radio-friendly sound. King of the Kill was also the first of three consecutive studio albums to feature guitarist and bandleader Jeff Waters on both lead vocals and bass.

== Track listing ==
Original pressing
No.	Title	Writer(s)	Length
1.	"The Box"	Jeff Waters	5:31
2.	"King of the Kill"	Waters, John Bates	3:12
3.	"Hell Is a War"	Waters	5:20
4.	"Bliss"	Waters	0:51
5.	"Second to None"	Waters, Aaron Randall	5:16
6.	"Annihilator"	Waters, Bates	4:28
7.	"21"	Waters	4:25
8.	"In the Blood"	Waters, Ralph Murphy	4:19
9.	"Fiasco ('The Slate')"	Waters	0:08
10.	"Fiasco"	Waters	3:55
11.	"Catch the Wind"	Waters	3:49
12.	"Speed"	Waters	4:37
13.	"Bad Child"	Waters	3:38
14.	"Only Be Lonely" (bonus track)	Waters	5:48

2000 reissue version
No.	Title	Writer(s)	Length
1.	"The Box"	Jeff Waters	5:31
2.	"King of the Kill"	Waters, Bates	3:12
3.	"Annihilator"	Waters, Bates	4:28
4.	"Bad Child"	Waters	3:38
5.	"21"	Waters	4:25
6.	"Bliss"	Waters	0:51
7.	"Second to None"	Waters, Randall	5:16
8.	"Hell Is a War"	Waters	5:20
9.	"Speed"	Waters	4:37
10.	"In the Blood"	Waters, Murphy	4:19
11.	"Catch the Wind"	Waters	3:49
12.	"Fiasco ('The Slate')"	Waters	0:08
13.	"Fiasco"	Waters	3:55
14.	"Only Be Lonely" (bonus track)	Waters	5:32
15.	"Comments from Jeff Waters" (bonus track)	Waters	10:24
16.	"Slates" (bonus track)	Waters	4:04

== Personnel ==
- Jeff Waters – vocals, guitars, bass
- Randy Black – drums
