= Hell:on =

Ukrainian thrash/death metal band

- Origin: Zaporizhzhia
- Genres: Thrash metal, death metal
- Years active: 2005–present
- Label: Ferrrum.com
- Members: Oleksiy Pasko; Oleh Talanov; Anton Vorozhtsov; Oleksandr Sitalo; Oleksandr Baiev
- Past members: Anton Pavlenko
- Website: hell-on.net

Hell:on is a Ukrainian thrash/death metal band formed in 2005 in Zaporizhzhia, eastern Ukraine by Oleksiy Pasko and Oleh Talanov. The band’s lyrics generally deal with mysticism, philosophy and anti-religion. Hell:on has ranked among the top bands in the Ukraine metal scene. At the recording of the last three albums the band has worked with Jeff Waters, Andy LaRocque, Marek Pajak, Andreas Kisser. Starting in 2006, the band has played numerous live shows all around Europe, mostly in Poland, Czech Republic, Slovakia, Hungary and Germany. During the creative activity, the band has recorded five full-length albums and one DVD.

== Discography ==
=== Studio albums ===
- 2005 - Hellion (demo, self-released)
- 2006 - Strong Enough (Moon Records)
- 2007 - Beyond the Fake (EP, self-released)
- 2008 - Re:Born (Comp Music/EMI)
- 2009 - In the Shadow of Emptiness (EP, self-released)
- 2011 - Strong Enough (re-released, Nocturnus records)
- 2011 - Re:Born (re-released, Metal Scrap records)
- 2012 - Age of Oblivion (Metal Scrap records)
- 2013 - Hunt (Ferrrum.com) (re-mastered 2020)
- 2015 - Decade of Hell (digital compilation)
- 2015 - Once Upon a Chaos (Ferrrum.com)
- 2019 - A Glimpse Beyond (EP) (The Crawling Chaos Records)
- 2020 - The Architect's Temple (Single)
- 2020 - Scythian Stamm (Hell Serpent Music)
- 2024 - Shaman (Archivist Records)

=== DVD ===
- 2009 - Hell Damage road (WIMP records)

== Current members ==
- Oleksiy Pasko - guitars
- Anton Vorozhtsov - guitar
- Oleksandr Sitalo - bass
- Oleh Talanov - drums
- Oleksandr Baiev - vocals

== Past members ==
- Anton Pavlenko - guitars
