= Annihilator (album) =

Studio album by Annihilator
- Released: May 17, 2010
- Recorded: 2009–2010
- Genre: Thrash metal
- Length: 48:51
- Labels: Earache Records (Europe); Marquee Records (Japan); Riot Entertainment (Australia) iTunes (US and Canada)
- Producer: Jeff Waters

Annihilator chronology
Live at Masters of Rock (2009)	Annihilator (2010)	Feast (2013)

Annihilator is the thirteenth album by Canadian heavy metal band Annihilator, released on May 17, 2010 by Earache Records in Europe, Marquee Records in Japan, Riot Entertainment in Australia and by iTunes in the US and Canada.

== Track listing ==
No.	Title	Writer(s)	Length
1.	"The Trend"	Jeff Waters	7:04
2.	"Coward"	Waters, Dave Padden	4:22
3.	"Ambush"	Waters	3:22
4.	"Betrayed"	Waters	4:34
5.	"25 Seconds"	Waters	4:49
6.	"Nowhere to Go"	Waters	5:08
7.	"The Other Side"	Waters	4:20
8.	"Death in Your Eyes"	Waters, Padden	5:58
9.	"Payback"	Waters	4:48
10.	"Romeo Delight" (Van Halen cover)	Michael Anthony, David Lee Roth, Edward and Alex Van Halen	4:26
Total length:			48:51

Professional ratings
Review scores
Source	Rating
Lords of Metal	(92/100)
Fury Rocks	(7.8/10)
Danger Dog	4/5 stars

== Personnel ==
- Jeff Waters - lead & rhythm guitar, bass, backing vocals
- Dave Padden - lead vocals, rhythm guitar
- Ryan Ahoff - drums

== Chart performance ==
Chart (2010)	Peak position
Greek Album Charts	14
German Album Charts	49
French Album Charts	142
Japanese Album Charts	169
