= All for You (Annihilator album) =

Studio album by Annihilator
- Released: May 24, 2004
- Recorded: 2004
- Genres: Thrash metal; groove metal
- Length: 55:29
- Label: AFM
- Producer: Jeff Waters

Annihilator chronology
Double Live Annihilation (2003)	All for You (2004)	Schizo Deluxe (2005)

Professional ratings
Review scores
Source	Rating
AllMusic	3.5/5 stars
Classic Rock	7/10 stars

All for You is the tenth studio album by Canadian heavy metal band Annihilator, released on May 24, 2004, by AFM Records. It was the first album to feature Dave Padden on vocals. It was also the second to feature Mike Mangini on drums.

== Track listing ==
All tracks are written by Jeff Waters.

No.	Title	Length
1.	"All for You"	4:29
2.	"Dr. Psycho"	7:03
3.	"Demon Dance"	5:12
4.	"The One"	4:35
5.	"Bled"	6:20
6.	"Both of Me"	8:08
7.	"Rage Absolute"	4:46
8.	"Holding On"	4:06
9.	"The Nightmare Factory"	5:40
10.	"The Sound of Horror" (Instrumental)	5:08
Total length:		55:29

== Credits ==
- Jeff Waters – guitars, bass, backing vocals, lead vocals (on "Holding On"), intro (on "Dr. Psycho")
- Dave Padden – lead vocals (tracks 1–7, 9 and 10)
- Mike Mangini – drums

Additional personnel

- Curran Murphy – additional guitars
- Joe Bongiorno – additional guitars
