= Suicide Society =

Studio album by Annihilator
- Released: September 18, 2015 (international edition); September 16, 2015 (Japanese edition)
- Studio: Watersound Studios Inc., Dunrobin, Ottawa, Canada
- Genre: Thrash metal, heavy metal
- Length: 45:08 (standard edition); 63:06 (limited edition bonus disc)
- Label: UDR Music (international edition); Avalon (Japanese edition)
- Producer: Jeff Waters

Annihilator chronology
Feast (2013)	Suicide Society (2015)	Triple Threat (2017)

Singles from Suicide Society
- 1. "Suicide Society" Released: July 31, 2015; 2. "Creepin' Again (Parasomnia)" Released: August 17, 2015; 3. "My Revenge" Released: September 15, 2015; 4. "Snap" Released: October 1, 2015

Suicide Society is the fifteenth album by the Canadian heavy metal band Annihilator. It was released on September 18, 2015, by UDR Music, and is the first album to feature guitarist and bandleader Jeff Waters performing lead vocals on all tracks since 1997's Remains due to the departure of Dave Padden in December 2014. It also marks the return of bassist Cam Dixon, who toured with the band from 1994 to 1995, as well as the addition of new guitarist Aaron Homma, both of whom are credited with providing backing vocals in the liner notes.

On this album, Jeff Waters handled all instrumental work in the studio apart from the drums, played by returning drummer Mike Harshaw. The album marks the final studio appearance of Harshaw, who announced via his Facebook page in May 2016 that he had parted ways with the band in order to spend more time with his family and pursue other musical interests.

A music video for the title track was released on July 31, 2015. A lyric video for the song "Creepin' Again" was released on August 17. Another single was released, "My Revenge" on September 15, 2015. "Snap" released another music video on October 1, 2015.

The song "Break, Enter" was penned about a personal experience Waters had chasing down criminals who had broken into his home. The bonus disc "The Ravenstreet Sessions" is a typical Annihilator concert setlist that was recorded with vocalist/guitarist Dave Padden still in the band before heading to Europe for their 2013 summer tour.

== Track listing ==
All tracks are written by Jeff Waters.

No.	Title	Length
1.	"Suicide Society"	3:50
2.	"My Revenge"	5:06
3.	"Snap"	4:54
4.	"Creepin' Again (Parasomnia)"	4:16
5.	"Narcotic Avenue"	5:19
6.	"The One You Serve"	5:45
7.	"Break, Enter"	5:47
8.	"Death Scent"	5:11
9.	"Every Minute"	5:00
Total length:		45:08

Limited edition bonus disc - The Ravenstreet Sessions / Jeff Talks
No.	Title	Length
1.	"Deadlock"	5:24
2.	"Set the World on Fire"	4:51
3.	"Knight Jumps Queen"	4:35
4.	"Ambush"	3:39
5.	"Never, Neverland"	6:00
6.	"Time Bomb"	5:19
7.	"Smear Campaign"	4:55
8.	"Carnival Diablos"	5:18
9.	"Reduced To Ash"	3:17
10.	"I Am In Command"	4:25
11.	"Jeff Talks... (Track by track commentary on the songs from this album): I. "Suicide Society" (1:19); II. "Creepin' Again" (1:14); III. "Snap" (0:39); IV. "Narcotic Avenue" (0:37); V. "My Revenge" (1:07); VI. "The One You Serve" (0:58); VII. "Break, Enter" (2:02); VIII. "Death Scent" (0:32); IX. "Every Minute" (1:35)"	10:03
Total length:		63:06

== Personnel ==
Annihilator

- Jeff Waters – lead vocals, lead guitar, rhythm guitar, bass, production, engineering, mixing, mastering
- Mike Harshaw – drums, backing vocals
- Aaron Homma – backing vocals, live rhythm guitar
- Cam Dixon – backing vocals, live bass

Production

- Gyula Havancsák – cover art, artwork, design

== Charts ==
Chart (2015)	Peak position
Belgian Albums (Ultratop Flanders)	157
Belgian Albums (Ultratop Wallonia)	52
French Albums (SNEP)	155
German Albums (Offizielle Top 100)	44
Swiss Albums (Schweizer Hitparade)	33
