= Remains (Annihilator album) =

Studio album by Annihilator
- Released: July 21, 1997
- Recorded: 1996
- Genre: Thrash metal, industrial metal
- Length: 49:28; 62:28 (2000 re-release)
- Label: Music For Nations, CMC International
- Producer: Jeff Waters

Annihilator chronology
In Command (1996)	Remains (1997)	Criteria for a Black Widow (1999)

Professional ratings
Review scores
Source	Rating
AllMusic	2.5/5 stars

Remains is the sixth studio album by Canadian heavy metal band Annihilator, released on July 21, 1997 by Music For Nations and CMC International. All instruments were performed by Jeff Waters following the dissolution of the previous line-up. However, John Bates and Dave Steele make an appearance on "No Love" on guitars and vocals respectively, with Steele also appearing on "Wind". The album features a more industrial-oriented sound and also features a drum machine. Remains was the last album for 18 years (until Suicide Society) to feature lead vocals by Waters on an Annihilator album.

== Track listing ==
All tracks are written by Jeff Waters, except where noted.

No.	Title	Lyrics	Music	Length
1.	"Murder"			4:26
2.	"Sexecution"			4:34
3.	"No Love"	John Bates		4:45
4.	"Never"		Jeff Waters, Mike Leakey	5:14
5.	"Human Remains"	Bates		2:19
6.	"Dead Wrong"			5:12
7.	"Wind"			4:21
8.	"Tricks and Traps"		Waters, Leakey	4:59
9.	"I Want"			4:24
10.	"Reaction"			3:27
11.	"Bastiage"			4:43
Total length:				49:25

2000 re-release bonus tracks
No.	Title	Length
12.	"It's You"	5:32
13.	"Words from Jeff Waters"	8:32

== Personnel ==
- Jeff Waters – lead vocals, guitars, bass, drum machine, programming
- John Bates – some guitar on "No Love"
- Dave Steele – some vocals on "No Love" and "Wind"
