= Carnival Diablos =

- Cover art by Joachim Luetke

Studio album by Annihilator
- Released: January 23, 2001
- Recorded: Watersound Studios, Maple Ridge, British Columbia
- Genres: Thrash metal; heavy metal
- Length: 59:42
- Labels: Metal-Is; SPV/Steamhammer
- Producer: Jeff Waters

Annihilator chronology
Criteria for a Black Widow (1999)	Carnival Diablos (2001)	Waking the Fury (2002)

Professional ratings
Review scores
Source	Rating
AllMusic	3/5 stars
Metal Hammer	6/10
Rock Hard	9/10

Carnival Diablos is the eighth studio album by Canadian heavy metal band Annihilator, released on January 23, 2001 by Metal-Is/Sanctuary and SPV/Steamhammer. It is the first album to feature Joe Comeau, formerly of Overkill, on vocals.

== Track listing ==
All music is composed by Jeff Waters.

No.	Title	Lyrics	Length
1.	"Denied"	Joe Comeau	5:24
2.	"The Perfect Virus"	Jeff Waters	4:44
3.	"Battered"	Waters	5:22
4.	"Carnival Diablos"	Comeau	5:08
5.	"Shallow Grave"	Waters, Comeau	4:22
6.	"Time Bomb"	Waters, Comeau	4:49
7.	"The Rush"	Waters, Comeau	4:50
8.	"Insomniac"	Waters	6:15
9.	"Liquid Oval"	instrumental	3:51
10.	"Epic of War"	Waters	5:47
11.	"Hunter Killer" (The song "Hunter Killer" ends at 6:00. At 6:30 the hidden track "Chicken and Corn" begins.)	Waters	9:10

== Personnel ==
Performed by:

- Joe Comeau – vocals
- Jeff Waters – guitars, bass, backing vocals
- Ray Hartmann – drums
- Russell Bergquist – bass (not on the album)
- David Scott Davis – guitars
