= In Command (album) =

Live and in Command

Live album by Annihilator
- Released: 1996
- Recorded: 1989–1990
- Venue: The Ritz (New York City); The Showroom (San Antonio, Texas)
- Genre: Thrash metal
- Length: 70:05
- Label: The All Blacks B.V
- Producer: Jeff Waters

Annihilator chronology
Refresh the Demon (1996)	Live and in Command (1996)	Remains (1997)

In Command is a live album by Canadian band Annihilator. Tracks 1–5 were recorded live on November 11, 1989, at The Ritz, in New York City. Tracks 6–14 recorded live on November 2, 1990, at The Showroom in San Antonio, Texas.

== Track listing ==
No.	Title	Length
1.	"W.T.Y.D."	5:06
2.	"Wicked Mystic"	3:43
3.	"Ligeia"	5:35
4.	"Alison Hell"	5:15
5.	"Word Salad"	6:03
6.	"W.T.Y.D."	4:49
7.	"The Fun Palace"	5:12
8.	"Never, Neverland"	5:19
9.	"I Am in Command"	3:40
10.	"Stonewall"	4:23
11.	"Road to Ruin"	4:35
12.	"Sixes and Sevens"	6:01
13.	"Alison Hell"	4:56
14.	"Live Wire (AC/DC Cover)"	5:28

== Personnel ==
- Jeff Waters - lead and rhythm guitar, vocals
- Randy Rampage - vocals (tracks 1–5)
- Coburn Pharr - vocals (tracks 6–14)
- Dave Scott Davis - guitar, solo on track The Fun Palace
- Wayne Darley - bass
- Ray Hartmann - drums
