= Ballistic, Sadistic =

Studio album by Annihilator
- Released: January 24, 2020
- Recorded: 2019
- Studio: Watersound Studios, Ottawa, Canada
- Genre: Thrash metal
- Length: 45:28
- Label: Silver Linings Music and Neverland Music (International edition); Avalon (Japanese edition)
- Producer: Jeff Waters

Annihilator chronology
For the Demented (2017)	Ballistic, Sadistic (2020)	Metal II (2022)

Singles from Ballistic, Sadistic
- 1. "I Am Warfare" Released: October 10, 2019; 2. "Psycho Ward" Released: November 27, 2019; 3. "Armed to the Teeth" Released: December 13, 2019; 4. "Dressed Up for Evil" Released: January 17, 2020

Professional ratings
Review scores
Source	Rating
Metal Hammer Italia	7.2/10
Metal Injection	7.5/10 stars
Blabbermouth	7/10 stars
Sonic Perspectives	8/10 stars
Kerrang	3/5 stars
The Mighty Decibel	7.5/10 stars
Apocalypse Later	8/10 stars
Angry Metal Guy	2.5/5 stars
Metal Temple	10/10 stars
Metal Express Radio	7/10 stars
Reflections of Darkness	9/10 stars
Exclaim	8/10 stars

Ballistic, Sadistic is the seventeenth studio album by Canadian thrash metal band Annihilator. It was released via Silver Lining Music and Neverland Music on January 24, 2020, and was produced by group frontman Jeff Waters.

The album was preceded by singles "I Am Warfare" on October 10, 2019, "Psycho Ward" on November 27, "Armed to the Teeth" on December 13 and "Dressed Up for Evil" on January 17, 2020.

== Track listing ==
Ballistic, Sadistic track listing
No.	Title	Length
1.	"Armed to the Teeth"	4:26
2.	"The Attitude"	4:02
3.	"Psycho Ward"	4:39
4.	"I Am Warfare"	4:46
5.	"Out with the Garbage"	4:27
6.	"Dressed Up for Evil"	4:41
7.	"Riot"	3:46
8.	"One Wrong Move"	4:36
9.	"Lip Service"	5:49
10.	"The End of the Lie"	4:16
Total length:		45:28

== Personnel ==
- Jeff Waters – vocals, guitars, bass, production, engineering, editing, mixing
- Aaron Homma – lead guitar (track 5)
- Fabio Alessandrini – drums

=== Additional personnel ===
- Angie Waters – voice (track 3)
- Charile Waters – voice (track 3)
- Ruby Waters – voice (track 3)
- John Gallagher – backing vocals
- Kat Shevil Gillham – backing vocals
- Rich Gray (formerly Hinks) – engineering, editing
- Gyula Havancsak – cover, design, illustration
- Maor Appelbaum – mastering engineer
- Angie Waters – executive producer, management

== Charts ==
Chart (2020)	Peak position
Hungarian Albums (MAHASZ)	29
