= Refresh the Demon =

Studio album by Annihilator
- Released: March 11, 1996
- Recorded: Watersound (Maple Ridge, British Columbia)
- Genre: Thrash metal, heavy metal
- Length: 66:35
- Label: Music for Nations
- Producer: Jeff Waters, Paul Blake

Annihilator chronology
King of the Kill (1994)	Refresh the Demon (1996)	In Command (1996)

Professional ratings
Review scores
Source	Rating
AllMusic	4/5 stars

Refresh the Demon is the fifth studio album by Canadian heavy metal band Annihilator, released on March 11, 1996, by Music for Nations.

== Track listing ==
No.	Title	Lyrics	Music	Length
1.	"Refresh the Demon"	Jeff Waters	Waters, Randy Black	5:26
2.	"Syn. Kill 1"	Waters	Waters	4:32
3.	"Awaken"	Instrumental	Waters	0:53
4.	"The Pastor of Disaster"	Waters	Waters, Black	5:00
5.	"A Man Called Nothing"	Waters, John Bates	Waters, Black	5:59
6.	"Ultraparanoia"	Waters	Waters, Black	4:29
7.	"City of Ice"	Waters, Bates	Waters, Black	4:18
8.	"Anything for Money"	Waters	Waters, Black	3:37
9.	"Hunger"	Waters, Bates	Waters	5:20
10.	"Voices and Victims"	Waters, Bates	Waters, Black	4:18
11.	"Innocent Eyes"	Waters	Waters	5:03

Re-release bonus tracks
No.	Title	Lyrics	Music	Length
12.	"The Box" (Live)	Waters	Waters	4:33
13.	"Riff Raff" (includes short instrumental after some silence)	Bon Scott, Angus Young, Malcolm Young	Scott, Young, Young	9:44

Japanese edition bonus track
No.	Title	Lyrics	Music	Length
12.	"Nothing to Me" (Single Version)	Waters	Waters

== Personnel ==
- Jeff Waters – vocals, guitars, bass
- Randy Black – drums
- Dave Scott Davis – guitar solos on tracks 4, 6, 7 and 8
- Lou Bujdoso – backing vocals
