= Waking the Fury =

Studio album by Annihilator
- Released: March 18, 2002
- Recorded: Watersound Studios, Maple Ridge, Canada
- Genres: Thrash metal; groove metal
- Length: 54:04
- Label: SPV
- Producer: Jeff Waters

Annihilator chronology
Carnival Diablos (2001)	Waking the Fury (2002)	Double Live Annihilation (2003)

Professional ratings
Review scores
Source	Rating
Rock Hard	8.0/10 stars
Metalfan.nl	80/100
Vampster	(favorable)

Waking the Fury is the ninth studio album by Canadian heavy metal band Annihilator, released on March 18, 2002 by SPV. It was the last album with Joe Comeau on vocals and Russ Bergquist as the touring bassist.

== Track listing ==
All tracks are written by Jeff Waters, except where noted.

No.	Title	Lyrics	Length
1.	"Ultra-Motion"		5:07
2.	"Torn"	Joe Comeau	5:02
3.	"My Precious Lunatic Asylum"	Jeff Waters, Comeau	5:47
4.	"Striker"		5:00
5.	"Ritual"	Waters, Comeau	5:16
6.	"Prime-Time Killing"		4:32
7.	"The Blackest Day"	Comeau	5:10
8.	"Nothing to Me"		4:34
9.	"Fire Power"		4:53
10.	"Cold Blooded"	Comeau	3:53

Bonus tracks
No.	Title	Lyrics	Length
11.	"Refresh the Demon" (live)		5:32
12.	"Shallow Grave" (live)	Waters, Comeau	5:08
13.	"Nothing to Me" (radio edit)		3:39

== Personnel ==
- Jeff Waters – guitar, bass
- Joe Comeau – vocals
- Curran Murphy – guitar
- Russ Bergquist – bass (on "Nothing to Me")
- Randy Black – drums
