= Criteria for a Black Widow =

Studio album by Annihilator
- Released: June 1, 1999
- Recorded: Phantom Blitz Studios, Watersound Studios Inc., Ottawa, Canada
- Genre: Thrash metal
- Length: 50:50
- Label: Roadrunner Records
- Producer: Jeff Waters

Annihilator chronology
Remains (1997)	Criteria for a Black Widow (1999)	Carnival Diablos (2001)

Professional ratings
Review scores
Source	Rating
Allmusic	3/5 stars
Record Collector	4/5 stars

Criteria for a Black Widow is the seventh studio album by Canadian heavy metal band Annihilator, released on June 1, 1999, by Roadrunner Records. It is the only album to feature the reunited Alice in Hell-era line-up (with the exception of bassist Wayne Darley, who declined to rejoin the band, and was replaced by Russ Bergquist).

== Track listing ==
All music is composed by Jeff Waters.

No.	Title	Lyrics	Length
1.	"Bloodbath"	Jeff Waters, John Bates	5:21
2.	"Back to the Palace"	Waters, Bates	5:34
3.	"Punctured"	Waters, Bates	5:48
4.	"Criteria for a Black Widow"	Waters	5:57
5.	"Schizos (Are Never Alone) Part III" (4:26 on the 2010 reissue)	Instrumental	5:52
6.	"Nothing Left"	Waters, Bates	4:51
7.	"Loving the Sinner"	Waters	4:38
8.	"Double Dare"	Waters, Bates	5:26
9.	"Sonic Homicide"	Waters	4:28
10.	"Mending"	Instrumental	2:46
Total length:			50:41

Re-release bonus tracks
No.	Title	Lyrics	Length
11.	"Loving the Sinner" (bonus track)	Jeff Waters Vocal Version	4:34
12.	"Jeff Waters Speaks" (bonus track)	Waters	11:57

== Personnel ==
=== Band members ===
- Jeff Waters – guitar, bass, vocals, producer, engineer, mixing, liner notes
- Randy Rampage – vocals
- David Scott Davis – guitar
- Russell Bergquist – bass (not on the album)
- Ray Hartmann – drums

=== Production ===
- Mike Rogerson – engineer
- Paul Blake – assistant engineer
- Craig Waddell – mastering
- Victor Dezso – photography
- Carol Sirna – model
- Robert Stefanowicz – digital imaging
- Ralph Alfonso – package design
- Tom Bagley – restoration, drawing, logo illustration
