= Set the World on Fire (Annihilator album) =

Studio album by Annihilator
- Released: May 4, 1993
- Recorded: 1992–1993
- Studios: Fiasco Brothers Recording, New Westminster, Creation Studios and Vancouver Studios, Vancouver, Canada
- Genres: Heavy metal; speed metal
- Length: 38:50
- Label: Roadrunner / Epic
- Producer: Jeff Waters

Annihilator chronology
Never, Neverland (1990)	Set the World on Fire (1993)	Bag of Tricks (1994)

Professional ratings
Review scores
Source	Rating
AllMusic	2/5 stars
Revelationz	8/10 stars
Rock Hard	9.5/10 stars

Set the World on Fire is the third studio album by Canadian heavy metal band Annihilator, released on May 4, 1993 by Roadrunner and Epic Records. The album received mixed reviews, toning down the thrash elements of Alice in Hell and Never, Neverland in favor of a more radio friendly sound. The title track, "Knight Jumps Queen", and "Brain Dance" are still setlist regulars, becoming fan favourites years after the release of the album.

The album was successful in Europe (charting at No. 79 in the German charts) and Asia (charting at No. 47 in Japan) but failed to break America – leading to the band (along with many others) being dropped from Roadrunner in 1993. Bassist Wayne Darley left the band shortly after, as he was not able to enter Japan on tour in support of the album. The album was reissued in 2009.

== Track listing ==
No.	Title	Lyrics	Music	Length
1.	"Set the World on Fire"	Jeff Waters, Coburn Pharr	Waters	4:30
2.	"No Zone"	Waters	Waters, Wayne Darley, Ray Hartmann	2:47
3.	"Bats in the Belfry"	Waters, Pharr	Waters, Hartmann	3:37
4.	"Snake in the Grass"	Waters	Waters	4:55
5.	"Phoenix Rising"	Ralph Murphy	Waters	3:47
6.	"Knight Jumps Queen"	Waters	Waters	3:46
7.	"Sounds Good to Me"	Waters	Waters	4:18
8.	"The Edge"	Murphy	Waters	2:56
9.	"Don't Bother Me"	Waters, Pharr	Neil Goldberg, Waters	3:23
10.	"Brain Dance"	Waters, Pharr	Waters	4:51
Total length:				38:50

Limited edition digipak reissue bonus tracks
No.	Title	Lyrics	Music	Length
11.	"Hell Bent for Leather" (also in Japanese Edition)	Tipton	Tipton	2:54
12.	"Phoenix Rising" (Acoustic Version)	Murphy	Waters	4:09

== Personnel ==
Band members

- Aaron Randall – vocals
- Jeff Waters – guitars, bass, producer, mixing at Little Mountain Sound Studios, Vancouver
- Neil Goldberg – guitar, bass and first guitar solo on "Don't Bother Me"
- Wayne Darley – bass (credited)
- Mike Mangini – drums on tracks 1–3, 6, 8–10

Additional musicians

- Ray Hartmann – drums on "Snake in the Grass" and "Sounds Good to Me"
- Rick Fedyk – drums on "Phoenix Rising"
- John Webster – keyboards on "Phoenix Rising"
- Mark Lafrance, David Steele – backing vocals on "Phoenix Rising"
- Norm Gordon – backing vocals on "Brain Dance"
- Coburn Pharr – lyrics
- The Annihilettes – backing vocals on "Knight Jumps Queen" and "Brain Dance"

Production

- Paul Blake – engineer, mixing
- Max Norman, Bill Buckingham, Steve Royea – engineers
- Randy Staub – mixing of "Phoenix Rising" at Warehouse Studios, Vancouver
- Eddy Screyer – mastering at Future Disc, Hollywood, California

== Charts ==
Chart (1993)	Peak position
German Albums (Offizielle Top 100)	79
Japanese Albums Chart	47
