= Alice in Hell =

Studio album by Annihilator
- Released: April 17, 1989
- Recorded: 1988
- Studio: Live West Productions; Fiasco Bros. Studios, New Westminster, Canada
- Genre: Technical thrash metal; speed metal
- Length: 37:27
- Label: Roadrunner
- Producer: Jeff Waters

Annihilator chronology
| Welcome To Your Death (1986) | Alice in Hell (1989) | Never, Neverland (1990) |

Singles from Alice in Hell
- 1. "Word Salad" Released: 1989

Alice in Hell is the debut studio album by Canadian thrash metal band Annihilator, released on April 17, 1989 through Roadrunner Records. This was the only Annihilator album for ten years to feature Randy Rampage on vocals, until he returned for their seventh studio album Criteria for a Black Widow (1999).

== Album information ==
Although the album's insert lists five members, Annihilator was a three-piece (Randy Rampage, Jeff Waters and Ray Hartmann) at the time of its recording in 1988. In addition to guitar, Waters provides bass and backing vocals on the album, produced it, and wrote all the songs. Although Anthony Brian Greenham and Wayne Darley are noted on the album's insert as playing guitar and bass respectively, this was a mistake and they did not join Annihilator until after Alice in Hell was finished; Darley does, however, provide backing vocals on the album. Waters has explained in interviews the reason Greenham and Darley were listed in the credits was at the behest of Roadrunner.

Alice in Hell was the first of six Annihilator albums to feature songwriting contributions from former singer John Bates, who was credited as the (co-)writer of the songs "Alison Hell", "W.T.Y.D.", "Burns Like a Buzzsaw Blade" and "Human Insecticide". Bates also co-wrote some songs on Never, Neverland (1990), King of the Kill (1994), Refresh the Demon (1996), Remains (1997) and Criteria for a Black Widow (1999).

To promote Alice in Hell, Annihilator supported Onslaught internationally on their In Search of Sanity tour, and Testament (along with Wrathchild America) in the United States on their Practice What You Preach tour. After the tour was over, the band began preparations for their next album Never, Neverland.

The title track "Alison Hell" was released as part of a DLC package for Rocksmith on April 16, 2019.

== Reissues ==
The album was re-released twice: 1998 with three demo tracks as bonus tracks and again on September 9, 2003, in a two-disc compilation set along with Never, Neverland, entitled Two from the Vault. One of the demo tracks, "Powerdrain", serves as the base of the song "Sonic Homicide" on Annihilator's 1999 album Criteria for a Black Widow.

== Reception and legacy ==
Professional ratings
Review scores
| Source | Rating |
|---|---|
| AllMusic | 3/5 stars |
| Classic Rock | 3/5 stars |
| Rock Hard | 9.0/10 |

Alice in Hell has received mostly positive reviews. AllMusic's Eduardo Rivadavia stated that "Annihilator's brand of technical, thinking man's thrash metal garnered many fans with this fine debut, arguably the best release of the band's career." Adam McCann of Metal Digest referred to Alice in Hell as "a real classic thrash metal album", and wrote, "For a debut album, Annihilator blasted it out of the park, the Canadian band hit the ground running with one of thrash metal's best albums, tracks such as 'Human Insecticide', 'W.T.Y.D. (Welcome to Your Death)' and 'Alison Hell' in particular still stand tall today as thrash metal anthems as Jeff Waters demonstrated his prowess on guitar backed up by the indomitable vocals of the late Randy Rampage which drove Alice in Hell into MTV's heavy rotation."

=== Accolades ===
- In 2014, Loudwire ranked the album the 9th best thrash album not released by the Big Four.
- In 2015, VH1 listed the album as one of the greatest thrash debuts.
- In 2017, Loudwire also listed the album as the 30th best thrash metal album of all time.
- In 2020, Revolver placed it on their list of "10 Criminally Underrated 80s Thrash Albums."
- The same year, Loudwire included the album on their list of the best debut thrash albums of all time.

== Track listing ==
All lyrics are written by Jeff Waters, except where noted; all music is composed by Jeff Waters

| No. | Title | Lyrics | Length |
|---|---|---|---|
| 1. | "Crystal Ann" (instrumental) | | 1:40 |
| 2. | "Alison Hell" | John Bates, Waters | 5:00 |
| 3. | "W.T.Y.D." (Welcome to Your Death) | Bates, Waters | 3:56 |
| 4. | "Wicked Mystic" | Waters, Jody Weil | 3:38 |
| 5. | "Burns Like a Buzzsaw Blade" | Waters, Bates, Weil | 3:33 |
| 6. | "Word Salad" | | 5:49 |
| 7. | "Schizos (Are Never Alone) Parts I & II" | | 4:32 |
| 8. | "Ligeia" | | 4:47 |
| 9. | "Human Insecticide" | Bates, Waters | 4:50 |
| Total length: | | | 37:27 |

Bonus tracks - 1998 re-release
| No. | Title | Lyrics | Length |
|---|---|---|---|
| 10. | "Powerdrain" (Demo) | Waters | 2:49 |
| 11. | "Schizos (Are Never Alone), Parts I & II" (Demo) | Waters | 4:18 |
| 12. | "Ligeia" (Demo) | Waters | 4:56 |
| Total length: | | | 49:53 |

== Personnel ==
Annihilator

- Jeff Waters – lead guitar, rhythm guitar, classical guitar, bass, backing vocals, producer, mixing, lead vocals on bonus demo tracks
- Randy Rampage – lead vocals, backing vocals
- Ray Hartmann – drums
- Anthony Brian Greenham – rhythm guitar (credited, but does not perform)
- Wayne Darley – bass (credited, but does not perform), backing vocals

Additional personnel

- Dennis Dubeau – lead vocals (bridge on "Alison Hell"), backing vocals ("Alison Hell")
- Paul Blake – engineer
- Frank Donofrio – engineer
- Victor Dezso – photography
- Chris Gehringer – remastering
- Satoshi Kobayashi – reissue design
- Len Rooney – logo, cover art
- Recorded and mixed at Live West Productions, Fiasco Bros. Studios, New Westminster, Canada
