= Annihilator (band) =

Canadian thrash metal band

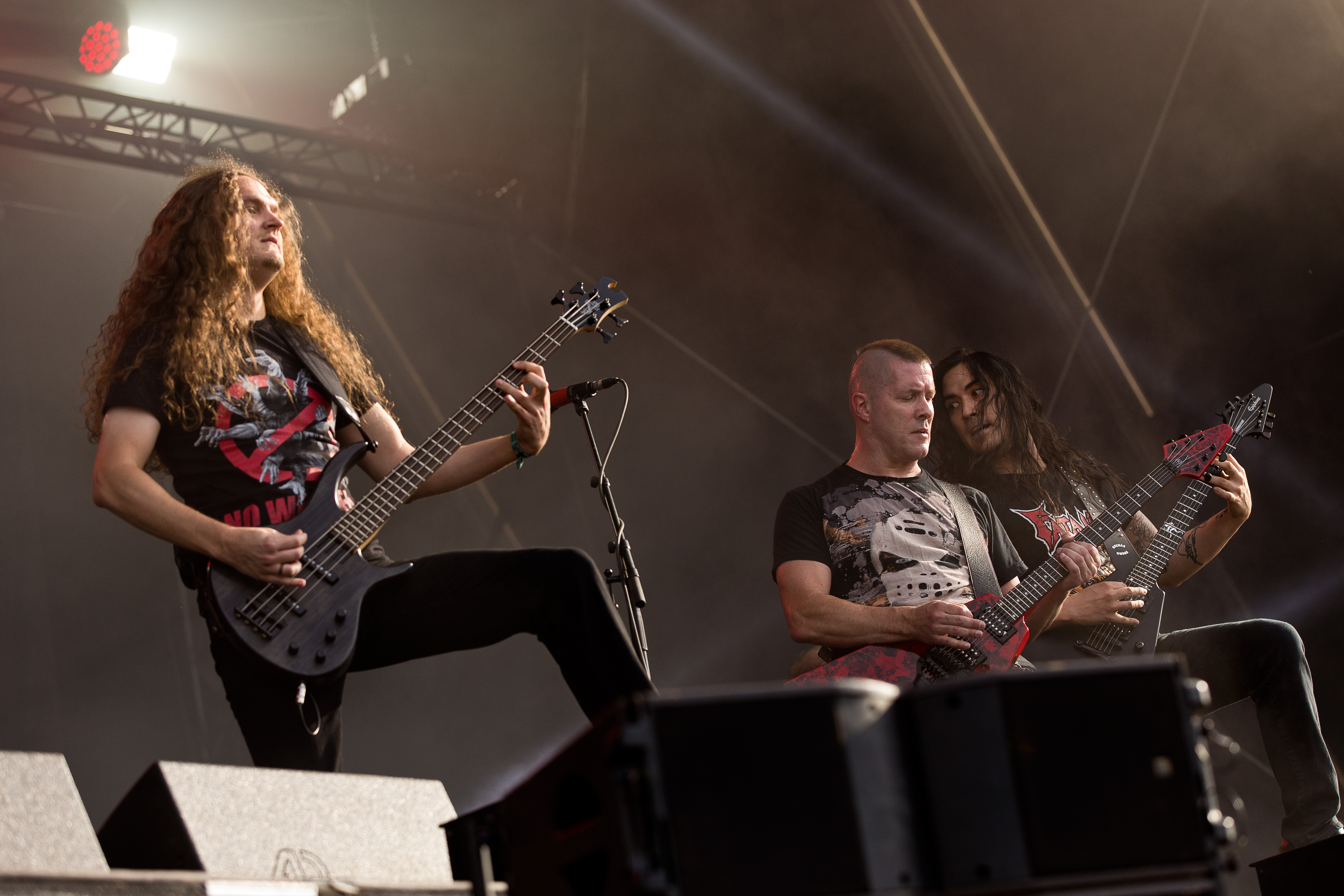
- Annihilator in 2016. From left to right: Rich Gray, Jeff Waters, and Aaron Homma.

Background information
- Origin: Ottawa, Ontario, Canada
- Genres: Thrash metal; heavy metal
- Works: Discography
- Years active: 1984–present
- Labels: Roadrunner; Epic; Attic; Hypnotic; CMC International; Music for Nations; Metal-Is; SPV; AFM; Marquee; Earache; Riot
- Members: Jeff Waters; Aaron Homma; Rich Gray; Fabio Alessandrini; Stu Block
- Past members: John Bates; Randy Rampage; Ray Hartmann; Coburn Pharr; Dave Scott Davis; Wayne Darley; Neil Goldberg; Mike Mangini; Aaron Randall; Randy Black; Joe Comeau; Dave Padden; Tony Chappelle; Ryan Ahoff; Mike Harshaw; Paul Malek; Anthony Greenham; Cam Dixon; Lou Bujdoso
- Website: annihilatormetal.com

Logo

Annihilator is a Canadian thrash metal band, formed in Ottawa, Ontario in 1984 by Jeff Waters. Waters is the band's sole constant member and has acted as its guitarist, bandleader, writer, producer, engineer, and occasional bassist and vocalist. Annihilator has released seventeen studio albums and has undergone many line-up changes, with Waters regularly assembling touring or session musicians to perform with him. Along with Sacrifice, Voivod and Razor, Annihilator has been referred to as one of the "Big Four" of Canadian thrash metal. They are also considered to be part of the "second wave" of thrash metal bands from the late 1980s and early 1990s.

Annihilator is the highest-selling Canadian heavy metal group, although most sales have been generated outside of Canada. The band's first two studio albums, Alice in Hell (1989) and Never, Neverland (1990), are considered influential Canadian metal records. Many of their subsequent albums — including their third and only major-label album Set the World on Fire (1993) — also received praise from critics and enjoyed success in Europe and Japan. Their most recent studio album of original material, Ballistic, Sadistic, was released in 2020.

== History ==
=== Early years (1984–1988) ===
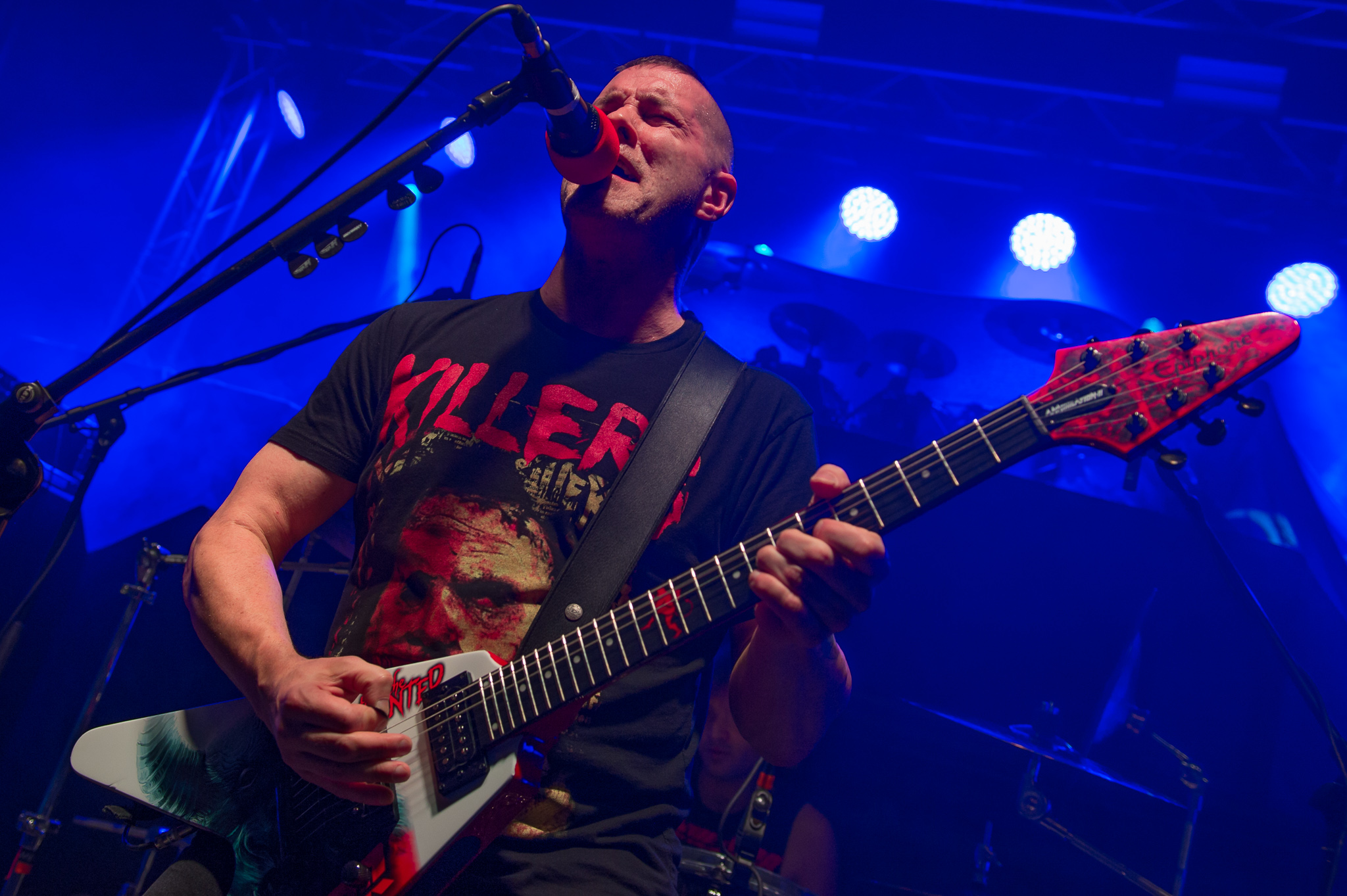
Guitarist and bandleader Jeff Waters has also acted as the band's lead vocalist on occasion.

Annihilator was formed in Ottawa, Ontario, by Jeff Waters and guitarist John Bates. Waters said he named the band after the tank that Eddie Murphy's character rode on in the 1984 film Best Defense. Waters and Bates wrote and recorded the song "Annihilator" (not to be confused with the song of the same name released on the 1994 album, King of the Kill). This original version of "Annihilator" was released on the special edition of the band's 2005 album Schizo Deluxe.

Waters and Bates then recruited drummer Paul Malek and bassist Dave Scott. In 1985, the band produced a demo titled "Welcome to Your Death". Bates and Scott left the band before its release, citing "artistic differences" and "personality conflicts". In 1986, Waters and Malek recorded another demo, "Phantasmagoria". A third demo, "Wicked Mystic" / "Word Salad", was recorded by Waters and Malek in 1987 and sent only to labels. Waters then moved to Vancouver, where he assembled an entire line-up, including drummer Ray Hartmann and former D.O.A. bassist Randy Rampage on vocals. In 1988 and 1989, Waters recorded guitar and bass tracks and produced what would become the band's debut album. Once the album was finished, he hired bassist Wayne Darley and guitarist Anthony Greenham for touring.

=== Rise to fame (1989–1993) ===
In 1988, Annihilator was signed to Roadrunner Records, and released their debut album Alice in Hell in April of the following year. The band embarked on its first world tour, opening up for Onslaught in Europe on their In Search of Sanity tour, and along with Wrathchild America, they supported Testament in North America on the latter's Practice What You Preach tour. The band also opened for Exodus and Metal Church. After the tour to support Alice in Hell ended in December 1989, frontman Randy Rampage left Annihilator to retain his seniority at a job on the shipping docks in North Vancouver.

Rampage was replaced by former Omen singer Coburn Pharr and the band released their second album, Never, Neverland, in 1990. The album's sales surpassed Alice in Hell, becoming the band's only album to chart in the UK, peaking at No. 48. Annihilator spent half a year touring with such bands as Reverend, Pantera and Xentrix, and opened for Judas Priest on the latter's Painkiller tour in Europe. After the Never, Neverland tour ended in the spring of 1991, Hartmann and Pharr left the band and were replaced by Mike Mangini (though the band would find a more permanent replacement in Randy Black) and Aaron Randall, respectively.

The band's third studio album, Set the World on Fire, distributed by Epic Records, was released in 1993 and was successful in Europe and Asia, but did poorly in the United States. It saw Annihilator toning down the speed and thrash elements of its predecessors in favour of a more radio-friendly sound. Bassist Wayne Darley left the band in August 1993 as he was unable to enter Japan, where the band was touring in support of the album. The band embarked on extensive tours to promote Set the World on Fire, touring in Europe with Coroner and in North America with Lillian Axe, and appearing at the Dynamo Open Air festival in the Netherlands. Also in 1993, Annihilator was dropped by then-surging Roadrunner Records.

=== Temporary hiatus, return and more albums (1994–2002) ===
Annihilator temporarily dissolved, but Waters kept the band name going when he, along with drummer Randy Black, recorded and released 1994's King of the Kill. Black played the drums; Waters wrote the songs (the title track and a few others with John Bates) and played the rest of the instruments. This album was an improvement from Set the World on Fire, as it returned to the thrashier sound of the early albums, and also leaned towards a groove-oriented vein. Bassist Cam Dixon then joined the band, followed by Lou Bujdoso from Meatwagon. In 1996, the band released Refresh the Demon, which was, for the most part, a return to the speed and technicality of the band's earlier days.

That was followed, in the next year, by Remains, a more industrial metal-oriented album. Waters is the only musician on the album (he used a drum machine); by this time, he was the sole band member.

Inspired after seeing Slayer perform in Vancouver in the summer of 1998, Waters decided to reunite the Alice in Hell line-up to record another album. All members apart from bassist Wayne Darley, who had health problems, agreed to reunite. Bassist Russ Bergquist joined the band in Darley's place. This line-up released Criteria for a Black Widow and toured successfully. However, Rampage was fired following the tour for his erratic and often drunken behaviour. Then-Overkill guitarist and former Liege Lord frontman Joe Comeau requested to replace him during the tour, while Curran Murphy replaced Davis on guitar and Randy Black rejoined on drums.

During the early 2000s, Annihilator released the albums Carnival Diablos (2001) and Waking the Fury (2002), both very critically successful. After considerable success, the band's line-up once again dissolved.

=== The Dave Padden era (2003–2013) ===
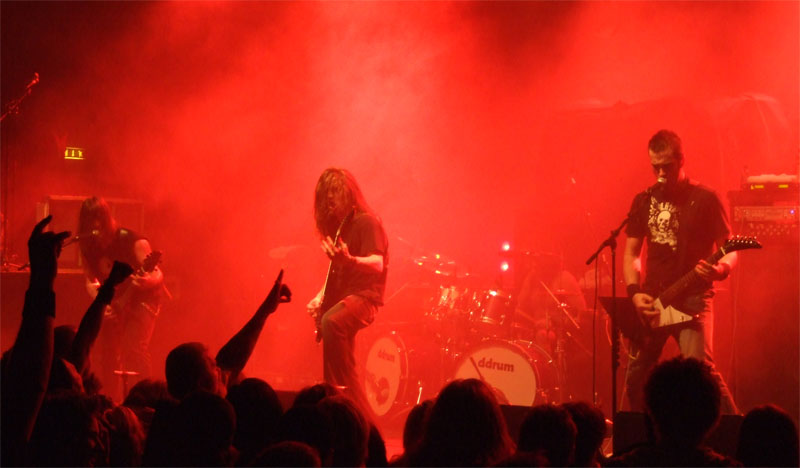
Annihilator performing in Oslo, Norway in 2007

Following years of line-up changes, Jeff Waters decided to work with a touring-only line-up so he recruited Dave Padden as a permanent vocalist/rhythm guitarist, while Waters recruited touring bassists and drummers. Annihilator's first two albums in this three-man band format as Waters played both bass and guitar, with Padden on vocals and a hired drummer were All for You (2004) and Schizo Deluxe (2005). Mike Mangini rejoined for the former album in 2004 and Tony Chappelle was hired for the latter's recording in 2005.

In 2007, Annihilator released their twelfth album Metal. It features several guest performers, such as Corey Beaulieu (Trivium), Willie Adler (Lamb of God) and Jeff Loomis (Nevermore). The band's self-titled thirteenth album was released in 2010, coming to be in a more modern thrash metal-styled sound.

Annihilator returned to Canada for two live shows, making it the first time since 1993 that the band had played live in North America. On July 10, 2011, Annihilator headlined the Quebec City Imperial Theatre to a sold-out crowd. They played the main stage (along with Kiss and Motörhead) on July 24, 2011 at Montreal's Heavy MTL Festival.

Annihilator released their fourteenth studio album, Feast, on August 23, 2013.

=== Departure of Dave Padden and Suicide Society (2014–2016) ===
In the summer of 2014, Oscar Rangel replaced Al Campuzano, their bassist since 2010. Jeff Waters said on his Facebook that he had actually contacted Wayne Darley, the band's bassist from the classic early 1990s line-up, about having him rejoin, although once again he declined, in Jeff's words "Wayne wanted to do it but couldn't ... personal reasons." The band has continued their touring cycle since then.

Dave Padden left the band sometime in December 2014 via a phone call to Waters, informing him of his desire to step away from the constant touring in order to spend more time with his family. Waters unsuccessfully attempted to persuade Padden to remain in the band, offering him a pay rise. He later admitted in a German radio interview to being emotionally shaken by the departure. After a number of weeks searching for a replacement vocalist, Waters decided that he would handle vocals himself once again, in addition to doing everything but play drums in the studio. Padden's departure was not made public until six months later, in June 2015, when Waters made an announcement on Annihilator's Facebook page, but attaching a YouTube link directly below of audio snippets from various songs on the band's then-upcoming album, Suicide Society. Canadian metal guitarist Aaron Homma from Killitorous, Erimha and Vital Remains was announced as Paddens replacement on guitar while Waters returned to vocals.

Never, Neverland singer Coburn Pharr surprised audiences when he returned for a short time on the 70000 Tons of Metal cruise in January 2015. Pharr performed the songs "Reduced to Ash", "The Fun Palace", "I Am in Command", "Road to Ruin" and "Stonewall".

By April 2015, Annihilator had begun work on their fifteenth studio album. Waters stated that the album's musical direction would be "something quite different." The album, titled Suicide Society, was released on September 18, 2015.

Drummer Mike Harshaw announced via his Facebook page in May 2016 that he had parted ways with Annihilator amicably after four years in order to spend more time with his family as well as to pursue other musical interests as he continued work with his own band, Prismind. Fabio Alessandrini joined Annihilator shortly thereafter.

In September 2016, Annihilator played Calgary Metalfest alongside fellow Canadian speed/thrash metal pioneers Exciter, Razor, Sacrifice and a local band Gatekrashör.

In late November 2016, the band announced a compilation album, entitled Triple Threat, which was released through UDR Records on January 27, 2017. The album consists of three discs, including one containing Annihilator's Jeff Waters, Aaron Homma, and Rich Gray (formerly Hinks) along with other artists playing an acoustic set of the band's most well-known ballads and acoustic songs, all done in single takes. The second and third discs were released as Blu-ray DVDs, one containing Annihilator's full set at Bang Your Head Festival in Germany, and the other containing a documentary profiling the band's extensive career.

=== For the Demented, Ballistic, Sadistic and upcoming eighteenth studio album (2017–present) ===
By the end of 2016, Annihilator had begun working on their sixteenth studio album. Waters stated, "On the next one, the changes I'm gonna make… I only said two things. I've got all these people telling me, 'You've gotta go back to this album,' or that album, or that album, or that album. 'You've gotta do this,' 'You've gotta do that.' So what I do is I block it out. But I've decided that I'm going to not worry about catchy, commercial choruses — 'commercial,' as in you remember it, where you intentionally make that chorus the most important part of the song and you want people to remember that one every time. That kind of is the opposite of what I used to do in the earlier days. In the earlier days, I would go, 'I don't care about the chorus being the main part; I want the whole song to be cool.' So therefore the choruses were not as commercial or catchy. And they remained heavy back then; the choruses would end up being heavy. Whereas on my Suicide Society record I just did, you could have a heavy song, but then you hit the chorus and you go, 'Woah, that's pretty mainstream stuff in the choruses.' And the other thing was, since I'm such a fan of so many bands, I let myself go a little bit on the last album with being too blatantly obvious with my influences and my musical loves as a fan. So you really heard a song that had a lot of the Master of Puppets era of music from Metallica, and you really heard a Megadeth-y song on there, and you really heard in my vocals some Hetfield and Mustaine-isms. And I think that was great, as a fan, to get it out, but I think I need to do more of my own thing on the next record."

In February 2017, Waters said that the sixteenth Annihilator studio album was being co-produced and co-engineered by bassist Rich Gray, making it the "first time I've actually had somebody else in the studio since 1990 (Never, Neverland) working with me on stuff." On September 12, 2017, it was announced that the album was titled For the Demented, and would be released on November 3; more details on the album, including track listing and artwork, and the music video for "Twisted Lobotomy" were released on the same day. In support of For the Demented, Annihilator (along with Death Angel) opened for Testament on the latter's European Brotherhood of the Snake tour, which took place in November and December 2017. The band toured Europe twice in 2018; first with Testament and Vader in March and April, and toured there again from October to December.

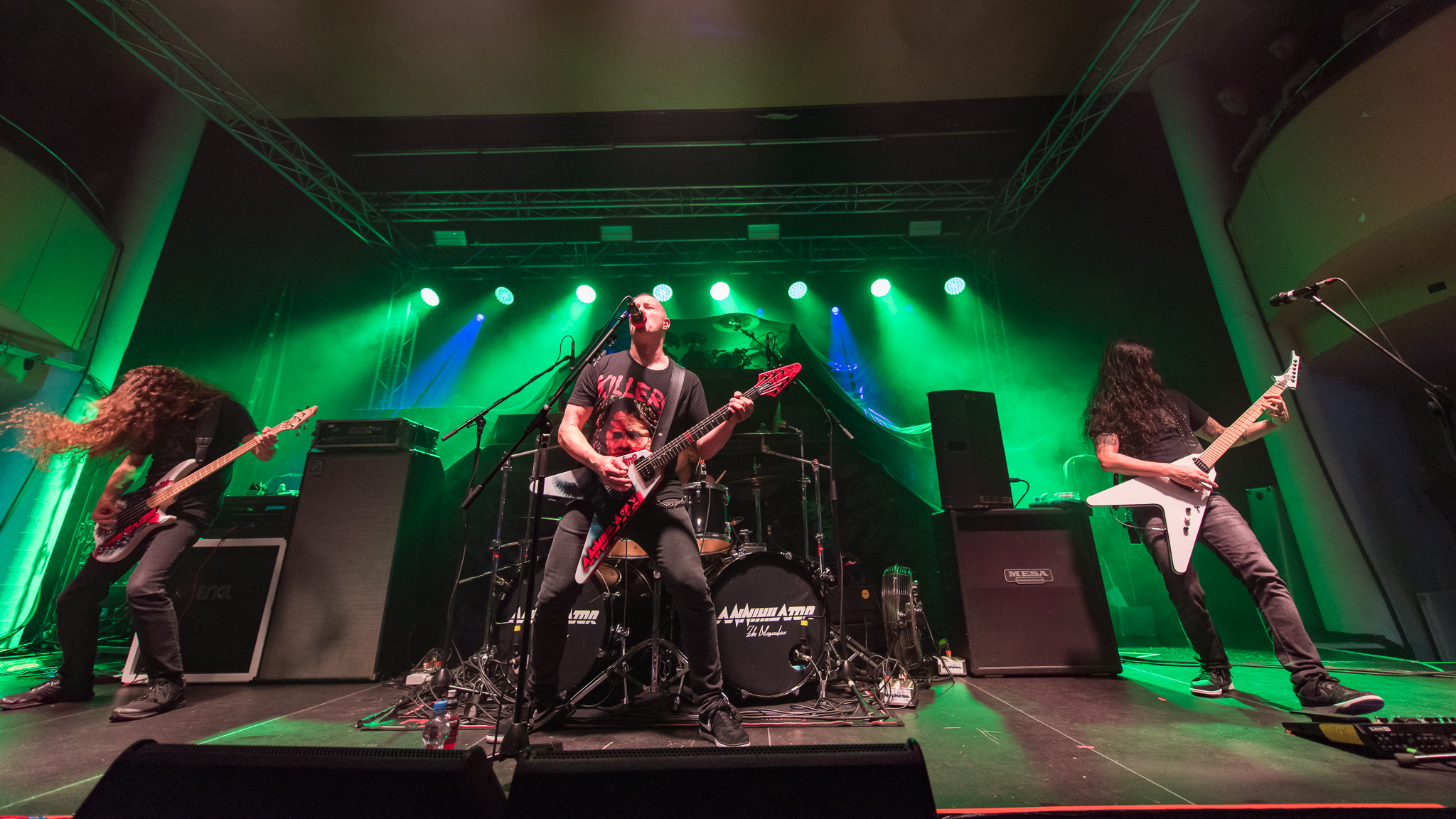
Annihilator performing in 2017

On August 14, 2018, former Annihilator vocalist Randy Rampage (who sang on the albums Alice in Hell and Criteria for a Black Widow) died of an apparent heart attack, at the age of 58.

In September 2018, Waters reported that Annihilator would release their seventeenth studio album in 2019. He later confirmed that it would be released in January 2020. On October 10, 2019, Annihilator released "I Am Warfare" as the lead single of the then-upcoming album Ballistic, Sadistic, which was released on January 24, 2020.

In 2019, Waters got married and moved to England. The band released Metal II, a near complete re-recording of their 2007 album Metal, on February 18, 2022, which serves as a tribute to Eddie Van Halen and Alexi Laiho, the latter of whom appears posthumously on one of the album's re-recorded tracks "Downright Dominate", which also features Dave Lombardo on drums and Stu Block on vocals. In January 2022, Waters announced that he would be once again stepping down as lead vocalist and focusing solely on lead guitar while Block would handle lead vocals on the band's future live shows.

In June 2023, Waters announced on social media that he had completed work on the next Annihilator album, though as of February 2026, the new album has not been released and there have been no updates since the initial announcement.

Former Annihilator frontman Coburn Pharr died on February 25, 2025, at the age of 62.

== Influences ==
In a 2013 interview with Photogroupie.com, Waters acknowledged his influences, stating:

"I started listening to Elton John, Kiss, Sweet, AC/DC then it evolved from hard rock with electric guitar to Black Sabbath and the heavier stuff, Judas Priest, Maiden, Loudness, Van Halen was coming in. Then I get turned on to the thrash stuff, so then it was Razor, Exciter... Those first albums were a huge influence on metal bands."

Elsewhere in the interview, Waters talked about the impact Iron Maiden had on him and the band:

"They're all great...but Bruce Dickinson is one brilliant, unique, gifted, talented person...the guy's a genius."

== Band members ==
=== Current ===
Image	Name	Years active	Instruments	Release contributions
	Jeff Waters	1984–present	lead and rhythm guitar; backing vocals; studio bass (1984–2016, 2017–present); lead vocals (1985–1986, 1994–1997, 2015–2022)	all releases
	Aaron Homma	2015–present	rhythm and lead guitar; backing vocals	Suicide Society (2015); For the Demented (2017); Ballistic, Sadistic (2020)
	Rich Gray (formerly Hinks)	2015–present	bass; backing vocals; production; engineering	For the Demented (2017); Ballistic, Sadistic (2020)
	Fabio Alessandrini	2016–present	drums	Ballistic, Sadistic (2020)
	Stu Block	2021–present	lead vocals	Metal II (2022)

=== Former ===
Image	Name	Years active	Instruments	Release contributions
	Paul Malek	1984–1985; 1986	drums	Metal (2007) backing vocals
	John Bates	1984–1985	lead vocals	Remains (1997) guitar
	Dave Scott	1984–1985	bass	none
	Richard Death	1985	drums	none
	Ray Hartmann	1987–1992; 1999–2001	drums	Alice in Hell (1989); Never, Neverland (1990); Set the World on Fire (1993); In Command (1996); Criteria for a Black Widow (1999); Carnival Diablos (2001)
	Dennis Dubeau	1987–1988	lead vocals	Alice in Hell (1989) (backing vocals on "Alison Hell" with lead vocals on bridge)
	Randy Rampage	1988–1989; 1998–2000 (died 2018)	lead vocals	Alice in Hell (1989); In Command (1996); Criteria for a Black Widow (1999)
	Kasey "K.C." Toews	1987–1988	rhythm guitar	none
	Anthony Greenham	1989	rhythm guitar	Alice in Hell (1989) (credited, but does not perform on the album)
	Wayne Darley	1987–1988; 1989–1993	bass; backing vocals	Alice in Hell (1989) (credited, but does not perform on the album on bass); Never, Neverland (1990); Set the World on Fire (1993); In Command (1996)
	Dave Scott Davis	1989–1992; 1993–2001	rhythm and lead guitar; backing vocals	Never, Neverland (1990); Refresh the Demon (1996); In Command (1996); Criteria for a Black Widow (1999); Carnival Diablos (2001)
	Coburn Pharr	1989–1992 (died 2025)	lead vocals	Never, Neverland (1990); Set the World on Fire (1993) (lyrics on s/t track); In Command (1996)
	Aaron Randall	1992–1993	lead vocals	Set the World on Fire (1993)
	Neil Goldberg	1992–1993	rhythm and lead guitar; backing vocals	Set the World on Fire (1993)
	Mike Mangini	1993; 2004–2005; 2007	drums	Set the World on Fire (1993); All for You (2004); Metal (2007)
	Randy Black	1994–1996; 2002–2003	drums	King of the Kill (1994); Refresh the Demon (1996); Waking the Fury (2002); Double Live Annihilation (2003)
	Cam Dixon	1994–1995; 2015	bass; backing vocals	Suicide Society (2015)
	Lou Bujdoso	1995–1997	bass; backing vocals	Refresh the Demon (1996)
	Dave Machander	1996 (died 2010)	drums	none
	Russell Bergquist	1999–2003; 2005–2007	bass	Criteria for a Black Widow (1999); Carnival Diablos (2001); Waking the Fury (2002); Double Live Annihilation (2003)
	Joe Comeau	2000–2003	lead vocals	Carnival Diablos (2001); Waking the Fury (2002); Double Live Annihilation (2003)
	Curran Murphy	2002–2005	rhythm guitar	Waking the Fury (2002); Double Live Annihilation (2003); All for You (2004)
	Dave Padden	2003–2014	lead vocals; rhythm guitar (from 2005)	All for You (2004); Schizo Deluxe (2005); Metal (2007); Annihilator (2010); Feast (2013)
	Sandor de Bretan	2004	bass	none
	Rob Falzano	2004	drums	none
	Tony Chappelle	2005	drums; backing vocals	Schizo Deluxe (2005)
	Brian Daemon	2007	bass; backing vocals	none
	Alex Landenburg	2007	drums	none
	Ryan Ahoff	2007–2008	drums	Live at Masters of Rock (2009); Annihilator (2010)
	Dave Sheldon	2007–2008	bass	Live at Masters of Rock (2009)
	Alberto "Al" Campuzano	2010–2014	bass	Feast (2013)
	Carlos Cantatore	2010	drums	none
	Flo Mounier	2011	drums	none
	Mike Harshaw	2012–2016	drums; backing vocals	Feast (2013); Suicide Society (2015)
	Oscar Rangel	2014–2015	bass	none

== Discography ==
- Alice in Hell (1989)
- Never, Neverland (1990)
- Set the World on Fire (1993)
- King of the Kill (1994)
- Refresh the Demon (1996)
- Remains (1997)
- Criteria for a Black Widow (1999)
- Carnival Diablos (2001)
- Waking the Fury (2002)
- All for You (2004)
- Schizo Deluxe (2005)
- Metal (2007)
- Annihilator (2010)
- Feast (2013)
- Suicide Society (2015)
- For the Demented (2017)
- Ballistic, Sadistic (2020)
- Metal II (2022)
