= Liege Lord =

American heavy metal band

- Origin: Stamford, Connecticut, U.S.
- Genres: Heavy metal; power metal; speed metal
- Years active: 1984–1990, 2012–present
- Labels: Metal Blade; Iron Works; Black Dragon
- Members: Tony Truglio; Joe Comeau; Danny Wacker; Joe DiBiase; Frank Gilchriest
- Past members: Matt Vinci; Andy Michaud; Pete McCarthy; Van Williams; Frank Cortese; Paul Nelson
- Website: liegelord.com

Liege Lord is an American power metal band active in the 1980s. It was formed by Matt Vinci, Anthony Truglio and Frank Cortese.

== History ==
Liege Lord was originally a Judas Priest cover band named Deceiver (after the Judas Priest song of the same name). Judas Priest's influence can be heard in the early vocals and guitar riffs of the Freedom's Rise album.

Liege Lord first signed on with the French record label Black Dragon after Christian Logue of Savage Grace recommended the company to the band. Freedom's Rise was released in 1985 on Black Dragon in Europe, and on Ironworks in America.

Reaching cult status in the metal world with their three releases, the band featured Joe Comeau, who would later go on to play with thrash metal bands Overkill and Annihilator. Guitarist Anthony Truglio went on to play in the band Gandhi with Page Hamilton from Helmet, and also played in the new version of Helmet. Guitarist Paul Nelson would go on to play with Blues/Rock icon Johnny Winter and winning a Grammy Award and multiple Grammy Nominations signing with his own solo artist deal on Sony/EMI Records.

Master Control was recorded from March 22 to April 11, 1988. The album was produced by Terry Date and Liege Lord.

As of August 2012, Liege Lord has been active again and headlined the Keep It True XVI festival, which took place from April 19 to 20, 2013, at Tauberfrankenhalle in Lauda-Königshofen, Germany.

Founding member Matt Vinci died of cancer on September 9, 2023.

== Musical style ==
Loudwire stated that the band's "classicist approach to the music left them stranded in between the two popular juggernauts of thrash and hair metal."

== Members ==
- Joe Comeau – vocals (1987–1990, 2012–present)
- Tony Truglio – guitar (1984–1990, 2012–present)
- Danny Wacker – guitar (2012–present)
- Joe DiBiase – bass (2024–present)
- Frank Gilchriest – drums (2013–2018, 2024–present)

=== Former members ===
- Matt Vinci - bass (1984–1990, 2012–2023; his death)
- Frank Cortese – drums (1984–1990)
- Andy Michaud – vocals (1984–1987)
- Pete McCarthy – guitars (1984–1986)
- Paul Nelson – guitar (1986–1990; died 2024)
- Van Williams – drums (2019–2023)

== Discography ==
=== Albums ===
- Freedom's Rise (1985)
- Burn to My Touch (1987)
- Master Control (1988)

=== Singles and demos ===
- "Black Lit Knights" (1987)
- Demo (1985)
