= Big John Bates =

Canadian singer/guitatist

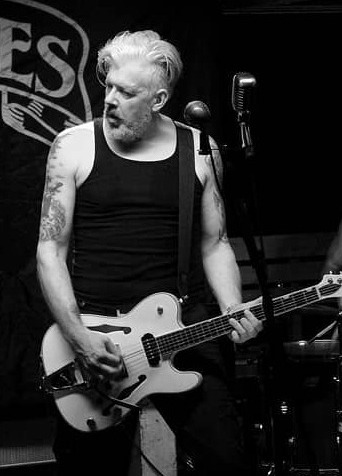

Background information
- Also known as: John Bates, BJB
- Born: Vancouver, Canada
- Genres: Americana, garage, psychobilly, gothabilly, thrash metal (early)
- Occupations: Singer, musician, songwriter
- Instruments: Vocals, guitar
- Website: bigjohnbates.com

Big John Bates is a Canadian singer, songwriter and guitarist. He cofounded and performed in Annihilator co-writing many songs on the ban'd first and highest selling album, Alice in Hell. As the creator of Big John Bates & the Voodoo Dollz (the first touring rock'n'roll burlesque show in the world) he put out four critically acclaimed full-length LPs and two DVDs on various labels. Following that were three albums he released with a string section, the Noirchestra, where he delved into a Gothic Americana sound. Bates has also had long-term sponsorships with Jagermeister, Gretsch (guitars) and Hofner (basses) through his 25-year career.

== Early life ==
Bates was born in Vancouver. His adopted father Bill "Hank" Bates was an amateur ice hockey goalie in Toronto and was drafted by the New York Rangers. Before he learned of their interest Bill had registered with the RAF and went to London as a mechanic and pilot in WW2. When informed of the draft decision Bill's father Harry told the Rangers "Hank's joined a bigger team". John initially wanted to be a professional ice hockey goalie, practicing with the Nepean Raiders until his attention turned to guitar at age 15. John's birth father was a self-taught musician in the style of Buddy Holly who wrote songs with the Beau-Marks from Montreal. Bates' early guitar bodies were made by his brother in high-school shop with electric parts and necks scavenged from old Silvertone guitars. He has publicly stated that the nickname, Big John Bates, was given to him in his early 20's by close friends and was "re-purposed" by a Vancouver promoter before announcing the band's first show at the Piccadilly Pub.

John grew up listening to his parents' swing albums and Bill Haley until he eventually discovered hard rock through a guitarist friend from Syracuse, New York. He then took a few lessons at a local music shop in order to meet Exciter guitarist John Ricci. Bates' first real guitar was a Gibson Marauder that was stolen when his parents' house was burgled during a party. While saving for a replacement he focused on lyrics and vocals which led to the formation of his first band Annihilator with Jeff Waters.

The original Big John Bates sound came from his interpretations of 1960s surf, garage, exotica and psychobilly. After forming the band Noirchestra in 2012 with Brandy Bones, Bates and Bones partnered with various musicians to release both the "Headless Fowl" EP and the Battered Bones LP (2012), the From the Bestiary LP (2015) and the Skinners Cage LP (2019).

== Career ==
=== Annihilator ===
John Bates first band was as a founding member of Annihilator, a thrash metal band. His meeting Jeff Waters was through mutual neighbourhood friends with the intention to cover AC/DC songs. After meeting, they decided to instead write original songs together and the two of them formed Annihilator. Bates recruited bassist Dave Scott while Waters brought in drummer Paul Malek. The band rehearsed daily in the basement of a women's fashion shop under Bank Street in Ottawa for a two-year period before settling in Val-d'Or after a residency there. During this time, Waters and Bates co-wrote most of the tracks from the albums Alison Hell and Never, Neverland before the first incarnation of the band dissolved.

Bates and Scott quit the group to form Ligeia, notably recording a version of Alison Hell in 1987 that was pre-dated the Annihilator release (on cassette only).

Following that, Bates went to business school in Nepean, Ontario while he started Bates Motel. After graduation, he moved to Vancouver, where Bates Motel recorded a FACTOR-funded LP produced by Jeff Waters in 1996. The CD was released by Tomcat Records, owned by Doug Bennett from Doug and the Slugs and sold out all four pressings. During the recording of the follow-up, Bates's songwriting had developed into more of a rockabilly style and the record was scrapped with four songs surviving as the first "Big John Bates" seven inch, which was released on red vinyl in 1999.

Bates later co-wrote songs on King of the Kill, engineered the demos for the record deal, and subsequently wrote songs included on the three following albums. Bates also contributed a guitar track to "Remains".

=== Bates Motel ===
Bates Motel was formed in Ottawa in 1987. They self-released four cassettes to college radio across Canada and the band moved with Bates to Vancouver in 1992. In Vancouver, Bates teamed up with Kermit McFedries (drums) and Sandy Matusik (bass) to record the debut album "Tales of Ordinary Madness" (title taken from a work by Charles Bukowski). The album was recorded at Fiasco Brothers studio in New Westminster and was released on Tomcat Records (owned by Doug from Doug and the Slugs. The studio and engineer (Paul Blake) were also involved in the recording of the Annihilator debut Alison Hell. After a few cross-Canada tours the band folded and Bates briefly performed as guitarist with Bif Naked for her Plum Records period, Bif Naked.

=== Big John Bates & the Voodoo Dollz ===
The group was formed in 2000 and peers considered the group's style garage/rock'n'roll music that was part of the neo-psychobilly scene. The band cited influences such as Shadowy Men on a Shadowy Planet, the Cramps, Reverend Horton Heat, early Alice Cooper, the pioneers of swing music and the new burlesque revolution. They were the first touring band to incorporate burlesque performers including Little Miss Risk and performed over 1000 shows and festivals throughout Europe and North America. The group received one of Canada's first Jagermeister music sponsorships as the group used Jager onstage with shots, syringes and flaming pasties. A Gretsch guitar sponsorship also followed with Bates featured in the 2006 Gretsch catalogue with his Black Falcon. Bates supported notable artists such as the Fuzztones, the Blasters, Black Rebel Motorcycle Club, Solomon Burke, Koko Taylor, Big Bad Voodoo Daddy, The Boss Hoss and Andre Williams. Bates brought the group to an end in December 2010 though a version continued touring as the Big John Bates Grindshow until Bates and Brandy had new music ready for the launch of the Big John Bates: Noirchestra in 2012.

=== Noirchestra ===
Big John Bates' Noirchestra project with Brandy Bones officially launched in Vancouver in 2012. However, their initial recording for the song "Scarecrow Close" was done in 2010. The single was featured in Hot Topic stores across the US and was released as a seven-inch by Rookie Records. Brandy Bones also received a Hofner Strings endorsement for upright bass. During the 2011 US tour the band completed demo recordings at Mark Robertson's studio (Legendary Shack Shakers) in Nashville from which a cover version of the TV theme song Rawhide was released. The LP/EP pair "Battered Bones" / Headless Fowl was recorded in early 2012 at Todd Simko's New Westminster studio. The tracks were mixed and mastered in Denver by Robert Ferbrache, creator of the "Denver Sound".

These sessions were split with six songs, released in North America as Headless Fowl in April 2012 by Frontman Records and the remainder released in Europe as "Battered Bones" on Rookie Records (Germany) in September 2012. Dead Kennedys frontman Jello Biafra claimed that "Headless Fowl was extremely cool" and included the release in the Alternative Tentacles catalogue. The EP was accompanied by a March/April 2012 co-headlining tour of the US and Canada with Murder By Death. Videos for the post-rock instrumental "Amerkin" and "Taste the Barrel" were produced by Chris Ray and Hora Morrior and released on YouTube to support the tour.

"Battered Bones" was supported by a Fall 2012 headlining tour through Europe and North America. These dates included Canadian Music Week and the Halifax Pop Explosion, where their dramatic performance earned the festival's highest rating among bands such as Black Lips, Elliott Brood and Wintersleep. The band began this tour as four-piece, but the fourth member subsequently disappeared without a trace during the tour. Following the tour Frontman Records compiled 13 tracks from the sessions and released them digitally as The Headless Fowl LP.

2014 saw the dark rock band release the 7" single "Black Timber, Bitter Root" mixed by The Smugglers guitarist David Carswell and released on Rookie Records and completed a 22-date headlining tour of Europe in May 2014. The band again became a four-piece, adding cello to their live sound and completed a Canadian and American tour with White Cowbell Oklahoma (CA) and The Paceshifters (NL) in winter of 2014. On their time off, the band wrote and recorded their sophomore LP From the Bestiary to the Leathering Room in their studio aboard the Caleuche, Bates' boat moored in Vancouver's False Creek. The LP saw its Canadian release in Spring 2016 and the group was joined by drummer Ty-Ty. They performed dates in the U.S. and on their second 2016 European tour they were completed by chamber-punk violinist RequiEmily. In March 2017 the Noirchestra completed their first tour of Japan; playing nine shows in six cities and recording two songs in Kyoto with Alternative Tentacles artist Ultra Bide. In early summer 2017 a third round of European touring that completed the promotion for "Bestiary" with both club and festival shows.

In summer 2018 the band performed festivals and shows while in Germany to record the drums and bass for their release Skinners Cage in Wilhelmshaven. Additional recording for the LP was once again aboard the Caleuche in Vancouver and was mixed by Felix Fung at Little Red Sounds. The LP was released by Rookie Records April 12, 2019, and garnered exceptional acclaim by press in Europe and Canada.

In 2017, their song "Taste the Barrel" appeared on the Canadian Broadcasting Corporation TV series Arctic Air. In 2020, the Noirchestra appeared on the Netflix series Snowpiercer (season 2, episode 4) as the band in the Night Lounge.

=== Big John Bates Returns ===
In 2023 Bates put a trio back together with long-time bassist Brandy Bones and drummer Tim Huston to revisit his entire catalog of music. Playing a sold-out birthday show in Vancouver at the WISE Hall, they brought back "upbeat bangers from all seven albums". After a few short tours and a sold-out show with Agent Orange, Bates has booked a 25th Anniversary Tour of Europe in Spring 2025.

== Band members ==
Current members

- Big John Bates
- Tim Huston

Past members

- Brandy Bones
- Ty (aka Ty-Ty the Saviour)
- Emily Bach (aka RequiEmily)
- JT Brander (aka JT Massacre)
- Leanne Chapman
- Kris Miehm (aka Brother Kris)
- Timothy Hagberg

== Discography ==
Big John Bates: Noirchestra

- 2010: "Scarecrow Close" 7" – Rookie Records (EU)
- 2012: "Headless Fowl" 12" EP – Frontman Records (CAN)
- 2012: Battered Bones LP+CD – Frontman Records (CAN) / Rookie Records (EU)
- 2014: "Black Timber", Bitter Root 7" – Rookie Records (EU)
- 2015: From the Bestiary to the Leathering Room LP+CD – Frontman Records (CAN) / Rookie Records (EU)
- 2019: Skinners Cage LP+CD – Frontman Records (CAN) / Rookie Records (EU)

Big John Bates & the Voodoo Dollz

- 1999: "Vibro-Psychotic" 7" – Nearly Nude Music (CAN)
- 2001: "Flamethrower" / "Voodoo BBQ" CD – Devil Sauce Recordings (CAN) / El Toro Records (SPAIN) -
- 2003: Mystiki CD – Devil Sauce Recordings (CAN)
- 2006: Take Your Medicine CD – Devil Sauce Recordings (CAN) / Wolverine Records (DE)
- 2007: Live at the Voodoo Ball DVD – Devil Sauce Recordings (CAN)
- 2009: Bangtown LP+CD – Frontman Records (CAN) / Rookie Records (DE) / Stag-o-Lee Records (EU) / Devil's Ruin Records (USA)
- 2010: Clockwork Blues DVD – Frontman Records (CAN)

Bates Motel

- 1988–1992: Various Cassettes (self-released)
- 1996: Tales of Ordinary Madness CD – Tomcat Records (CAN) / Nearly Nude Records (CAN)

Ligeia

- 1986–1987: Various cassettes (self-released)

Annihilator

- 1986: "Welcome to Your Death" (demo – lead vocals)
