= Jeff Waters =

Canadian guitarist

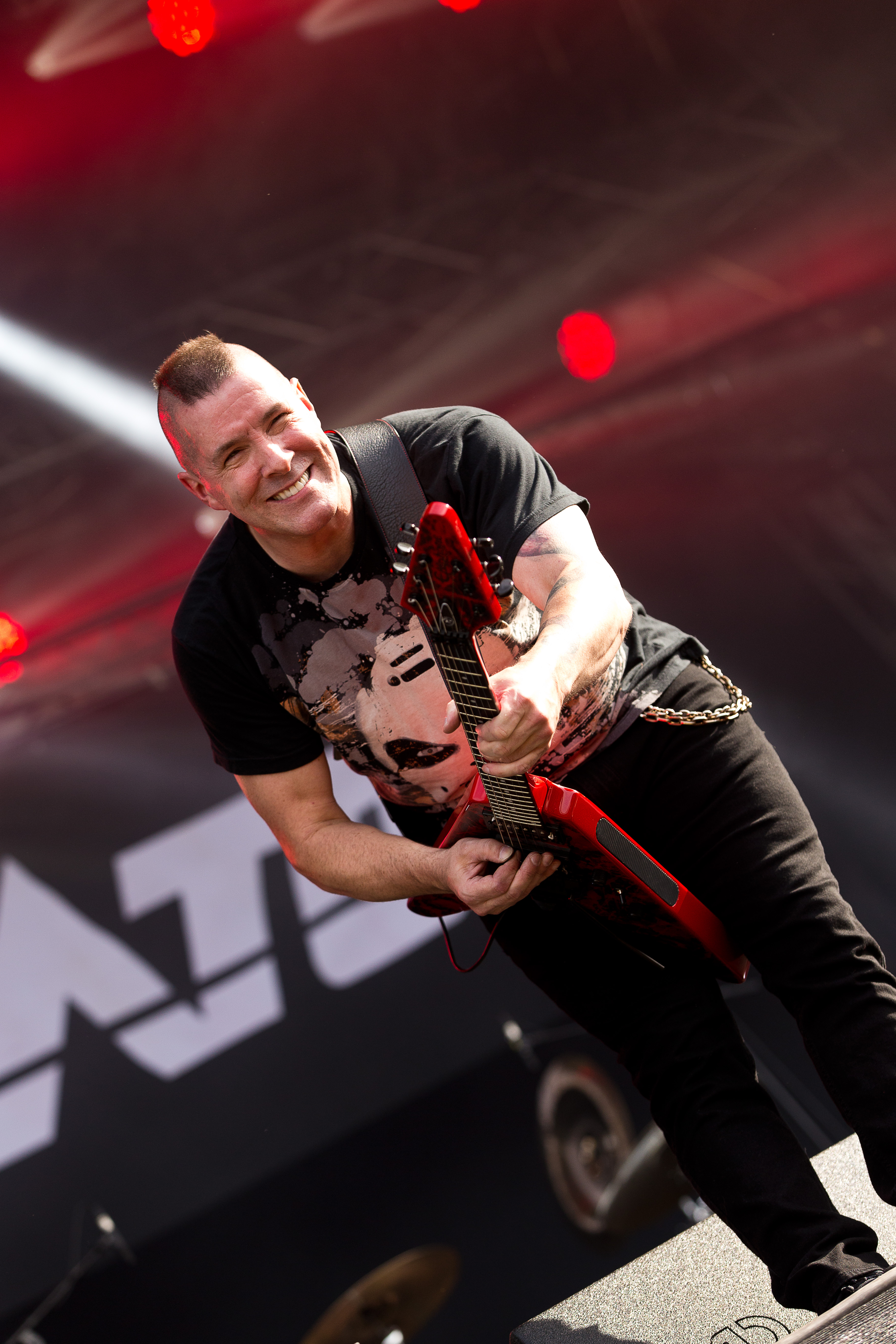
- Jeff Waters at Rockharz Open Air 2016 in Germany

Background information
- Born: February 13, 1966 (age 60); Ontario, Canada
- Genres: Thrash metal; speed metal; progressive metal; heavy metal; groove metal
- Occupations: Musician; record engineer & producer; songwriter; studio owner
- Instruments: Guitar; bass; vocals
- Years active: 1984–present
- Member of: Annihilator
- Website: annihilatormetal.com

Jeff Waters (born February 13, 1966) is a Canadian guitarist and the founder, bandleader and producer of the metal band Annihilator. He was born in Ontario and resides in the UK. Waters has owned Watersound Studios since 1994 (where it was in Maple Ridge, British Columbia) and from 2003 until 2018, in Ottawa, Ontario, and now in the UK.

Many consider him to be among the best thrash metal guitarists.

== Early life ==
Waters's father was in the military and his mother was a teacher. His family had houses in Ottawa and Camp Borden, Ontario as well as London, England. He took some classical and jazz guitar lessons at a young age.

Waters has referred to Van Halen, Randy Rhoads, Michael Schenker, Judas Priest, Iron Maiden and Black Sabbath as his early influences. In a 2013 interview with photogroupie.com, he said:

"I started listening to Elton John, Kiss, Sweet, AC/DC then it evolved from hard rock with electric guitar to Black Sabbath and the heavier stuff, Judas Priest, Maiden, Loudness, Van Halen was coming in. Then I get turned on to the thrash stuff, so then it was Razor, Exciter... Those first albums were a huge influence on metal bands."

== Career with Annihilator ==
Waters formed the band Annihilator in Ottawa, Ontario, in 1984. He wrote and recorded the song "Annihilator" (not to be confused with their 1994 song of the same name) with singer Big John Bates. This original version of "Annihilator" was released on the special edition of the 2005 album, Schizo Deluxe.

Waters has frequently changed Annihilator's line-up over the years. During the early era of the band, his goal was to produce a stable line-up. However, members left for a multitude of reasons such as family issues, substance abuse and work commitments. Due to these rapid line-up changes, Waters has taken on the role of bass player, engineer, producer and writer as well as guitar player. After some time, Waters began to embrace the idea of working with many other musicians, and recruited vocalist Dave Padden for 12 years (2003 - December 2014) as well as a revolving touring line-up. Jeff Waters has performed lead vocals for six of the band's studio albums and on the songs "Holding On" from 2004's All for You, "Too Far Gone" from the 2005 album Schizo Deluxe, "Operation Annihilation" from 2007's Metal, and "Demon Code" on the 2013 album Feast.

After a couple of weeks of decision sometime in December 2014, Waters made a return to lead vocals for the band on their 2015 album, Suicide Society following former bandmate Dave Padden's departure. Padden cited he wasn't at all happy playing in the band over the past five years and the decision to leave was not caused by anyone in the band but by a general discontent with the lifestyle and constant touring.

Annihilator has been touring prominently Europe and Asia since 1989. Despite not touring and receiving virtually no press or label interest in Canada and the US, Annihilator has become one of the biggest selling Canadian Metal band of all-time, yet the majority of their sales have been generated from Asia and Europe. Most of Annihilator's discography is hard to find in the band's home country of Canada. Waters has been quoted as saying:

"I live a few blocks from the Ottawa Citizen newspaper. One day, a few years ago (2005) I contacted the Entertainment editor by email and introduced myself, gave him links to our web site and info, and asked if he might spare a few minutes to talk with me about the band, as I live a few minutes walking from his office. He told me to mail him a CD and he would consider reviewing it. He didn't. It actually made me a bit sad, as I have been waving the flag for Canadian metal and Canadian music for over 21 years abroad and also have sold more than any other metal band from this fine land. Yet I could not even get a review or interview with our nation's capital newspaper, when local artists with no deal and no CD releases, were actually getting full page or front page stories. The last thing I needed was coverage in Ottawa but I thought, out of principle, I should try. Shot down in flames! Ha!"

== Legacy ==
Waters is well respected in the metal community for his technical skill and versatility on the guitar. In Annihilator, he plays passages on rhythm guitar, lead guitar, bass guitar, acoustic guitar, and classical guitar. Even when he is playing challenging material, he does so with speed, fluidity and precision. He has also arranged some Annihilator songs into unplugged versions.

Waters has been cited by many metal musicians worldwide as an influence on their own music. Artists from many bands such as 3 Doors Down, Slipknot, Nickelback, Megadeth, Killswitch Engage, Lamb of God, In Flames, Danko Jones, HIM, Children of Bodom, and WOLF have either cited Waters as an influence or have revealed themselves as a fan of Annihilator or his guitar playing.

Music writer Joel McIver identified Waters as the third-best metal guitar player in his 2008 book The 100 Greatest Metal Guitarists. Waters has been compared to Dave Grohl of Foo Fighters, due to being a multi-instrumentalist.

Watersound Studios Inc. has been Waters' studio since 1994. In 2003, he relocated his home from Maple Ridge to Ottawa, where he continues to be a sought-after mixing/mastering engineer and producer. Watersound Studios Inc. is now based in Durham, England.

== Equipment ==
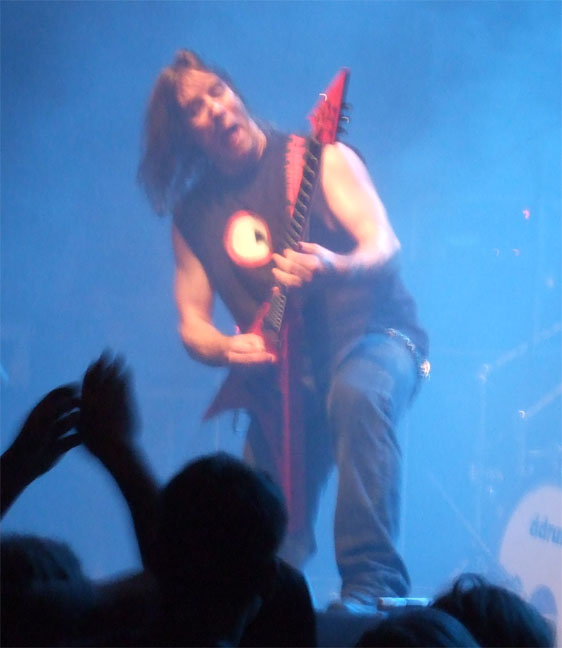
Waters performing in 2007

In the early stages of his career Waters used a Hamer Flying V. Around 1994, he began to experiment with other guitars and over the next few years used classic models such as a Gibson SG and Gibson Les Paul to achieve the diversity of sounds in Annihilator's music during this time period. He would also use a Fender Stratocaster from time to time in the studio and a Gibson Flying V Gothic when playing live. Waters has been known to use an ESP Dave Mustaine signature Flying V that he owns and it was this guitar that he used to record Schizo Deluxe as mentioned in the video section of annihilatormetal.com. Waters currently plays Epiphone Annihilation-V Guitars (his own model, available in Red or Black, with a Floyd Rose FRX Tremolo System, custom pick-ups, kill switch and other modifications), previously endorsing Ran Guitars. On a tour in Europe in November 2009, Waters used a prototype of the Epiphone Annihilation-V Flying V, which he has since sold. The new Annihilation-V shape is very similar to the original flying V, but has a smaller body and four cosmetic lines cut into the center of the V as well as a rubberized patch on the lowest edge of the V (to stop the guitar from slipping). It comes in "Annihilator Red" and Pitch black. For amplification, he used the Hughes and Kettner Coreblade head and is now using the EVH 5150III amplifier. He has also had his own signature overdrive pedal called the Jeff Waters Devil Drive by SolidGoldFX, however this is no longer in production.

== Personal life ==
Waters married Angie in 2018 and lives in Durham, England, where he runs his recording studio Watersound Studios.

== Discography ==
=== Annihilator ===
- Alice in Hell (1989)
- Never, Neverland (1990)
- Set the World on Fire (1993)
- King of the Kill (1994)
- Refresh the Demon (1996)
- Remains (1997)
- Criteria for a Black Widow (1999)
- Carnival Diablos (2001)
- Waking the Fury (2002)
- All for You (2004)
- Schizo Deluxe (2005)
- Metal (2007)
- Annihilator (2010)
- Feast (2013)
- Suicide Society (2015)
- For the Demented (2017)
- Ballistic, Sadistic (2020)
- Metal II (2022)

=== Amerikan Kaos ===
- Armageddon Boogie (2024)
- All That Jive (2025)
- The Sheeple Swing (2026)

=== Guest appearances ===
Year	Artist	Album	Song/s
1989	Defiance	Product of Society	Guitar solo on "Deadly Intentions"
2003	Merendine Atomiche	Walk Across Fire	Game Over
2003	Soulscar	Python	Anti-Faith
2005	Galloglass	Heavenseeker	Guitar solo on "Banished from Eternity"
2005	Roadrunner United	The All-Star Sessions	The Dagger and Independent (Voice of the Voiceless)
2005	Reckless Tide	Repent Or Seal Your Fate	Self Destruct and Misery
2006	Legen Beltza	Dimension of Pain	War of Wars
2006	Memorain	Reduced to Ashes	TV War
2007	After Forever	After Forever	De-Energized
2007	Reckless Tide	Helleraser	Vicious Circle
2007	Dew-Scented	Incinerate	Perdition for All
2007	Dimension Zero	He Who Shall Not Bleed	Guitar solo on "Way To Shine"
2008	Destruction	D.E.V.O.L.U.T.I.O.N.	Guitar solo on Urge (The Greed of Gain)
2008	Dustsucker	Diabolo Domination	Guitar solo on "Land of the King"
2008	Heavenwood	Redemption	Bridge to Neverland
2008	Outcast	Self-Injected Reality	Autonomy In Progress
2008	Bob Katsionis	Noemon	Athenian Light
2009	Evil One	Evil Never Die	
2009	Winters Dawn	The Winter Is Dawning	Raptors
2010	Evil One	Militia Of Death	Guitar solo on "Militia Of Death"
2010	Fozzy	Chasing the Grail	Martyr No More and God Pounds His Nails
2010	Lord Volture	Beast of Thunder	Pure Evil (Hides in the Dark)
2010	Rhemorha	I	Сжигая Дни
2011	Freedomination	Power of Nightmares (Demo)	Guitar solo on "Hide Yourself"
2012	Hell:on	Age Of Oblivion	My Doll
2011	Boarders	R-Existence	4th Reich
2016	Enemy of Reality	Arakhne	Nouthetisis
2016	Freedomination	Tales from the Vault (EP)	Guitar solo on "Hide Your Self"
