= Never, Neverland =

Studio album by Annihilator
- Released: August 7, 1990
- Recorded: February–April 1990
- Studios: Vancouver Studios (Vancouver, Canada)
- Genres: Thrash metal; speed metal
- Length: 43:59
- Label: Roadrunner
- Producers: Glen Robinson, Jeff Waters

Annihilator chronology
Alice in Hell (1989)	Never, Neverland (1990)	Set the World on Fire (1993)

Singles from Never, Neverland
- 1. "Stonewall" Released: January 25, 1991

Never, Neverland is the second album by thrash/heavy metal band Annihilator, released on August 7, 1990, through Roadrunner.

The album was re-released twice: in 1998 with three demo tracks as bonus tracks and again on September 9, 2003, in a two-disc compilation set along with Alice in Hell, entitled Alice in Hell/Never Neverland (as part of Roadrunner Records Two from the Vault series).

== Reception ==
Professional ratings
Review scores
Source	Rating
AllMusic	4.5/5 stars
Classic Rock	2/5 stars
Rock Hard	9.0/10 stars
Select	2/5 stars

The album received mostly positive reviews from fans and critics. Nick Griffiths of Select gave the album a two-out-of-five rating, and described it as a "patchwork of half-fulfilled promises, it threatens more than it delivers." He noted that "only when the lead axe spits caterwauling speedplay and the thrash rhythm do Annihilator finally wash their true colours in public" and that "elsewhere there's a tendency to steer into formularised ruts, escaping occasionally like on the ghoulish riffs of 'Sixes and Sevens'."

Alex Henderson of AllMusic gave the album 4.5 stars out of 5, calling it "one of 1990's strongest metal releases".

== Track listing ==
All tracks are written by Jeff Waters.

No.	Title	Lyrics	Length
1.	"The Fun Palace"	Coburn Pharr	5:51
2.	"Road to Ruin"		3:42
3.	"Sixes and Sevens"		5:20
4.	"Stonewall"		4:50
5.	"Never, Neverland"	Pharr	5:29
6.	"Imperiled Eyes"	Waters, Jody Weil	5:27
7.	"Kraf Dinner"		2:41
8.	"Phantasmagoria"		3:59
9.	"Reduced to Ash"	Waters, John Bates	3:09
10.	"I Am in Command"	Waters, Weil, Bates	3:34
Total length:			43:59

1998 and 2003 bonus tracks
No.	Title	Length
11.	"Kraf Dinner" (demo)	2:32
12.	"Mayhem" (demo of Reduced to Ash)	2:54
13.	"Freed from the Pit" (demo of Road to Ruin)	3:45

== Personnel ==
Band members

- Coburn Pharr – vocals
- Jeff Waters – all guitars, bass, drum writing and arrangements, cover concept
- Dave Scott Davis – guitars (credit only)
- Wayne Darley – bass (credit only)
- Ray Hartmann – drums

Production

- Glen Robinson – co-producer, engineer, mixing
- Jeff Waters co-producer
- Steve Royea – engineer
- George Marino – mastering
- Victor Dezso, Mark Van Der Wielen – photography
- Nick Gilman – artwork, cover design
- Len Rooney Creative – artwork
- Len Rooney – cover concept, cover design
- Monte Conner – executive producer
- Recorded February–April 1990 at Vancouver Studios, Vancouver, Canada
- Mixed in April 1990 at Le Studio, Morin Heights, Quebec, Canada
- Mastered at Sterling Sound, New York City, U.S.
- Chris Gehringer – remastering
- Satoshi Kobayashi – reissue design
