= Dave Padden =

Canadian singer

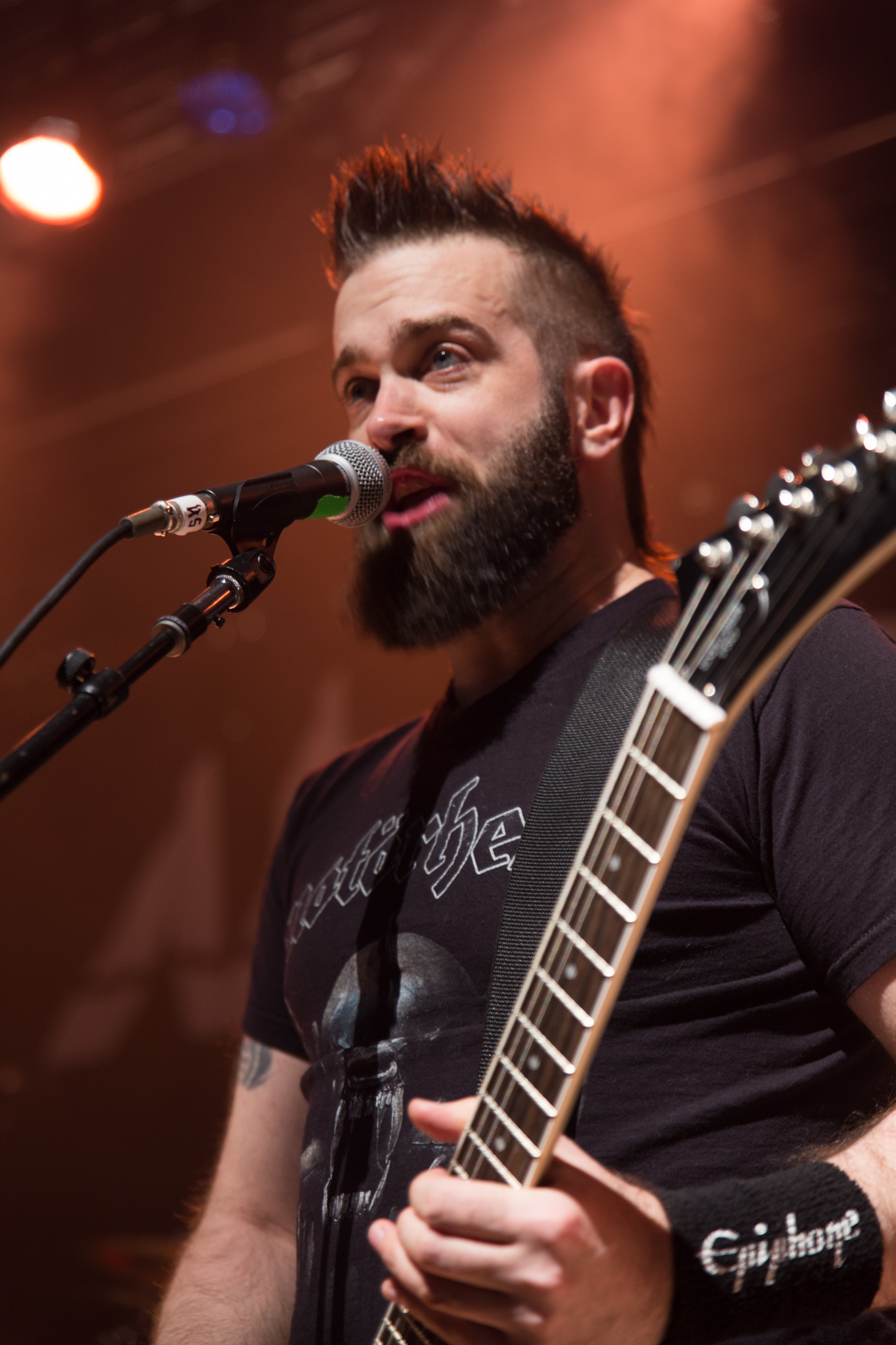
- Padden at 70000 Tons of Metal in 2015

Background information
- Born: February 13, 1976 (age 50); Canada
- Genres: Thrash metal, progressive metal, groove metal, industrial metal
- Occupations: Singer, musician, songwriter
- Instruments: Vocals, guitar
- Formerly of: Annihilator, Silent Strain, Terror Syndrome, The Bulge

David James Padden (born February 13, 1976) is a Canadian musician, best known as the former lead vocalist for thrash metal band Annihilator from 2003 to 2014.

In 2006, Padden co-founded the industrial thrash metal band Silent Strain, performing only as the vocalist, although little is known about the current status of the band.

Padden joined Canadian metal band Terror Syndrome as lead vocalist in 2008.

On June 2, 2015, it was announced that Padden had resigned from Annihilator in December 2014.

Padden currently works as a performer at the Roxy in Vancouver.

== Equipment ==
Padden has been seen using the Explorer model guitar, made by RAN Guitars, at Annihilator live events and it has been assumed that he's recorded with these same guitars. Once bandmate Jeff Waters left RAN Guitars, so did Padden. Instead of playing Epiphone's, after this, he's now a Dean endorser and plays both Deceiver and Z models. He's been seen using an Epiphone Prophecy Futura Ex custom with Seymour Duncan pickups.
