= Trypes =

Greek rock band

- Trypes in the 1990s

Background information
- Origin: Thessaloniki, Greece
- Genres: Post-punk; Alternative rock Experimental rock (later years)
- Years active: 1983–2001
- Labels: Ano-Kato Records, Virgin records
- Past members: Giannis Aggelakas; Babis Papadopoulos; Asklipios Zabetas; Giorgos Karras; Giorgos Tolios

Trypes (Greek: Τρύπες, "Holes") were a Greek rock band originating from Thessaloniki, Greece. Their unique sound emerged mainly from the combination of vocalist Giannis Aggelakas' distinctive singing style and lyrics and Giorgos Karras' post-punk and alternative rock instrumentation. They have produced landmark albums like Enia pliromena tragoudia (Nine paid songs) and Kefali gemato chrysafi (Head Full of Gold) which not only were commercially successful, but are also considered to be masterpieces of Greek rock discography.

== History ==
Trypes was created in 1983 when Giorgos Karras and Giannis Aggelakas wrote their first, post-punk influenced music and lyrics.

Michalis Kanatidis (guitar) and Kostas Floroskoufis (drums) accompanied them at their first appearance. In 1984 Babis Papadopoulos replaces Michalis at the guitar and in 1985 they record their first record, "Τρύπες" (Trypes - Holes), which included their first hit song "Ταξιδιάρα Ψυχή" (Taksidiara Psichi - Travelling Soul) for Ano-Kato Records. The album was followed by live appearances at the "Selini" club, the university campus and the surrounding areas of Thessaloniki. Kostas Floroskoufis was soon replaced by Giorgos Tolios; concerts were held in Athens in the Rodeo Club and at the open air amphitheater of Lykavittos, where they played the opening act for Dimitris Poulikakos.

Meanwhile, the band's working relationship with Ano - Kato Records started to go sour. They decided to go independent and - on borrowed money - recorded their second disk "Πάρτυ στο 13ο όροφο" (Party sto dekato trito orofo - Party on the 13th Floor) which was eventually published with Virgin Records. The album was very successful; it figured in the top five list of best rock albums of all time in Greece in 2006.

In 1990 came their third album, "Τρύπες στον Παράδεισο" (Trypes ston paradiso - Holes in Paradise), and their first concert outside Greece in Belfort, France. Guitarist Asklipios Zambetas joined the band as the fifth member.

The fourth album was recorded in 1993, titled "9 Πληρωμένα τραγούδια" (9 Pliromena tragoudia - "9 Paid Songs", or "9 Filled Songs" depending on context). A live performance at Lykavittos gathers a record-setting 10,000 people.

In 1994 a double live album was released, named "Κράτα το Σώου μαϊμού" (Krata to show maimou - Hold (keep up) the Show Monkey) with recordings from 4 concerts at Rodon club and 5 unplugged performances. Both this album's and the film soundtrack (H epohi ton dolofonon) sales went through the roof. Concerts during 1995 were often sold out all over Greece, at the Mylos club (Thessaloniki), Rodon club (Athens), and in England, where they performed in Manchester and at London's Marquee Club.

The fifth studio album, "Κεφάλι γεμάτο χρυσάφι" (Kefali gemato chrysafi - Head Full of Gold) arrived in 1996 and was a commercial success. Trypes' sixth and final studio album was titled "Μέσα στη νύχτα των άλλων" (Mesa sti nychta ton allon - Into the Night of Others) and was released in 1999. The band announced their break-up very soon after the album's release. All of the members maintained solo career, with the most notable being the solo discography of vocalist Giannis Aggelakas, who continued the experimentation started in the later Trypes works.

== Discography ==
- Trypes (1985)
- Party sto 13o orofo (1987)
- Trypes ston paradeiso (1990)
- Enia pliromena tragoudia (1993)
- Yperoxo tipota (1995)
- Krata to show maimou (1994)
- Kefali gemato chrisafi (1996)
- Mesa sti nihta ton allon (1999)

== Members ==
- Giannis Aggelakas – Vocals (1983–2001)
- Giorgos Karras – Bass guitar (1983–2001)
- Babis Papadopoulos – Lead guitar (1984–2001)
- Giorgos Tolios – Drums (1986–2001)
- Asklipios Zabetas – Rhythm guitar (1991–2001)

Past members

- Michalis Kanatidis – Guitar (1983–1984)
- Kostas Floroskoufis – Drums (1983–1986)

Session members

- Floridis – Saxophone
- Giorgos Christianakis – Synthesizer

== See also ==
- Diafana Krina
- Endelekheia
- Xylina Spathia
- Ypogeia Revmata
- Pavlos Sidiropoulos
