= Party sto 13o orofo =

1987 studio album by Trypes

Studio album LP, MC by Trypes
- Released: 1987
- Recorded: 1987
- Studio: Agrotikon
- Genre: Rock
- Length: 30:31
- Label: Virgin Records

Trypes GR chronology
Trypes (1985)	Party sto 13o orofo (1987)	Trypes ston paradeiso (1990)

Party sto 13o orofo is the second album of the Greek rock band Trypes and their first with Virgin Records following a break-down of their relationship with Ano-Kato Records. It was recorded in September and November 1987 at the studio Agrotikon and released in the same year on LP and MC. It was re-released as a CD in 1991. The album contains eight tracks.

1. Πάρτυ στο 13ο όροφο (Party sto dekato trito orofo, Party on the 13th floor)
2. Η πρώτη φορά (I proti fora, The first time)
3. Άχαρη μέρα (Ahari mera, Graceless day)
4. Η δικιά σου κοντινή Αμερική (I dikia sou kontini ameriki, Your own nearby America)
5. Ερωτευμένοι σχιζοφρενείς (Erotevmeni skhizofrenis, Schizophrenics in love)
6. Έκτη Αυγούστου (Ekti avgoustou, Sixth of August)
7. Η αυτοκρατορία των αναπήρων (I aftokratoria ton anapiron, The empire of the cripples)
8. Χορός των δειλών (Horos ton dilon, Dance of the cowards)

The album achieved remarkable commercial success and is often listed amongst Greece’s most acclaimed rock albums.
