= Trypes (album) =

Studio album LP by Trypes
- Released: 1985
- Recorded: Agrotikon studio 27 January 1985–29 January 1985
- Genre: Rock; Post-punk
- Length: 32:47
- Label: Ano-Kato Records

Trypes GR chronology
Trypes (1985)	Party sto 13o orofo (1987)

Trypes is the first album from the band Trypes. It was recorded at the end of January 1985 at the "Agrotikon" recording studio with Nikos Papazoglou as a sound engineer, and released during the same year by Ano-Kato Records. The album contains eleven tracks.

1. Βραδινή πλάνη (Vradini Plani, Evening misapprehension)
2. Ακροβάτης (Acrovatis, Acrobat)
3. Στριμωγμένος (Strimogmenos, In a narrow space)
4. Αμνησία (Amnessia, Amnesia)
5. Χωρίς εμένα (Horis emena, Without me)
6. Ταξιδιάρα ψυχή (Taxidiara psihe, Travelling soul)
7. Άσχημο όνειρο (Aschimo oniro, Bad dream)
8. Νταβατζής (Davajis, Pimp)
9. Για την πατρίδα (Ya tin patrida, For the homeland)
10. Παράξενη πόλη (Paraxeni poli, Strange city)
11. Θλιμμένοι στη γιορτή μας (Thlimmeni sti yorti mas, Sad people at our party)
