= Alive in Athens =

1999 live album by Iced Earth

Live album by Iced Earth
- Released: July 27, 1999
- Recorded: January 23–24, 1999
- Venues: Rodon Club, Athens, Greece
- Genres: Power metal; thrash metal
- Length: 180:06; 162:27 (DVD)
- Label: Century Media
- Producers: Jon Schaffer; Jim Morris

Iced Earth chronology
Something Wicked This Way Comes (1998)	Alive in Athens (1999)	Horror Show (2001)

Iced Earth video chronology
Gettysburg (1863) (2005)	Alive in Athens (2006)	Festivals of the Wicked (2011)

Professional ratings
Review scores
Source	Rating
AllMusic	3/5 stars
Metal Storm (DVD)	9/10 stars

Alive in Athens is a live album by American heavy metal band Iced Earth. It was recorded on the nights of January 23 and 24, 1999, in front of sold-out crowds of approximately 2000 people (on both nights) at the Rodon Club in Athens, Greece. Iced Earth was supporting the Something Wicked This Way Comes album and were on tour. It was turned into a single DVD and released in October 2006. The album features the return of former drummer Brent Smedley, who did not record on the band's previous album.

At the conclusion of "Violate", the band plays the opening riff of "The Trooper" by Iron Maiden. "Colors" was also played at this concert, but was not included on the CD due to a track listing mix-up. It is, however, included on the reissue of The Melancholy E.P..

Next to the CD version, there also exists a vinyl box version. It was released in 1999 and contained five pictures of the band's albums. One had the Alive in Athens artwork, the other ones had the Night of The Stormrider, Dark Saga, Days of Purgatory and Something Wicked This Way Comes artwork. It came originally with an Alive in Athens poster signed by Jon Schaffer. This box had the same track list as the three-disc version.

In 2008, Century Media reissued the three-CD release in a limited mini-LP gatefold sleeve. It included "Colors" as a bonus track on disc two.

According to a 2003 post by Jon Schaffer, the album was certified Platinum in Greece.

== Track listing ==
=== Disc I ===
No.	Title	Lyrics	Music	Length
1.	"Burning Times"	Matt Barlow, Jon Schaffer	Barlow; Schaffer	4:06
2.	"Vengeance Is Mine"	Barlow	Randall Shawver; Schaffer	4:42
3.	"Pure Evil"	Schaffer	Shawver; Schaffer	6:32
4.	"My Own Savior"	Barlow	Schaffer; Jim Morris	3:42
5.	"Melancholy (Holy Martyr)"	Schaffer	Schaffer	4:55
6.	"Dante's Inferno"	Schaffer	Schaffer	16:23
7.	"The Hunter"	Schaffer	Schaffer	4:09
8.	"Travel in Stygian"	Schaffer	Schaffer	9:02
9.	"Slave to the Dark"	Schaffer	Schaffer	3:52
10.	"A Question of Heaven"	Schaffer	Schaffer	8:17

=== Disc II ===
No.	Title	Lyrics	Music	Length
1.	"Dark Saga"	Schaffer	Schaffer	4:02
2.	"The Last Laugh"	Barlow	Shawver; Schaffer	4:38
3.	"Last December"	Schaffer	Schaffer	3:37
4.	"Watching Over Me"	Schaffer	Schaffer	4:53
5.	"Angels Holocaust"	Schaffer	Schaffer	4:31
6.	"Stormrider"	Schaffer	Shawver; Schaffer	4:50
7.	"The Path I Choose"	Schaffer	Shawver; Schaffer	5:44
8.	"I Died for You"	Schaffer	Schaffer	4:44
9.	"Prophecy"	Schaffer	Schaffer	6:10
10.	"Birth of the Wicked"	Schaffer	Schaffer	5:42
11.	"The Coming Curse"	Schaffer	Schaffer	8:56
12.	"Iced Earth"	Schaffer	Schaffer	6:58

Bonus track (2008 reissue)

No.	Title	Lyrics	Music	Length
13.	"Colors"	Schaffer	Shawver; Schaffer	5:13

=== Disc III ===
No.	Title	Lyrics	Music	Length
1.	"Stand Alone"	Barlow; Schaffer	Barlow; Schaffer	3:30
2.	"Cast in Stone"	Barlow	Shawver; Schaffer; Dave Abell	6:02
3.	"Desert Rain"	Schaffer	Schaffer; Abell	7:19
4.	"Brainwashed"	Schaffer	Shawver; Schaffer	5:12
5.	"Disciples of the Lie"	Schaffer	Schaffer	4:11
6.	"When the Night Falls"	Schaffer	Schaffer	7:47
7.	"Diary"	Barlow	Shawver; Schaffer; Abell	5:52
8.	"Blessed Are You"	Schaffer	Schaffer	5:46
9.	"Violate"	Schaffer	Schaffer	3:53

== DVD ==
On October 30, 2006, Century Media released a DVD version featuring live footage of the concert.

Shortly before the DVD was publicly released, Iced Earth rhythm guitarist and founder Jon Schaffer offered a statement which voiced dissatisfaction with Century Media (with whom Iced Earth was no longer signed at the time). A portion of this statement reads:

"I want you all to be aware of what it is that they [Century Media] are releasing. This is a very low-budget, badly edited video of an amazing concert and an awesome period in the history of Iced Earth. They promised me that they are going to keep the price down and that they are not going to market it as something it's not. But I feel it's my responsibility to let you know the reality of the situation."

Schaffer did not, however, go so far as to call for a boycott of the product, saying, "The decision to purchase the 'Alive in Athens' DVD is up to you. I just want you to be aware of what it is you're getting should you choose to do so."

The song order is not identical to that featured on the album version. A few songs are also missing, including "Slave to the Dark", "A Question of Heaven", and "Iced Earth". "Colors" was played at this concert as well, but was not included on the CD or DVD due to a track listing mix-up. It is however included on The Melancholy E.P. and the 2008 re-release of Alive in Athens.

No.	Title	Lyrics	Music	Length
1.	"Intro"	Instrumental		1:53
2.	"Burning Times"	Matt Barlow	Jon Schaffer	3:32
3.	"Vengeance is Mine"	Matt Barlow	Jon Schaffer; Randall Shawver	2:13
4.	"Dark Saga"	Jon Schaffer	Jon Schaffer	3:30
5.	"The Last Laugh"	Matt Barlow	Jon Schaffer; Randall Shawver	4:16
6.	"Cast in Stone"	Matt Barlow	Jon Schaffer; Randall Shawver	5:53
7.	"Last December"	Jon Schaffer	Jon Schaffer	3:29
8.	"Pure Evil"	Jon Schaffer	Jon Schaffer; Randall Shawver	6:16
9.	"Desert Rain"	Jon Schaffer	Jon Schaffer; Dave Abell	6:29
10.	"Dante's Inferno"	Jon Schaffer	Jon Schaffer	16:20
11.	"The Hunter"	Jon Schaffer	Jon Schaffer	3:59
12.	"Melancholy (Holy Martyr)"	Jon Schaffer	Jon Schaffer	5:04
13.	"Angels Holocaust"	Jon Schaffer	Jon Schaffer	4:39
14.	"Stormrider"	Jon Schaffer	Jon Schaffer; Randall Shawver	4:45
15.	"The Path I Choose"	Jon Schaffer	Jon Schaffer; Randall Shawver	5:39
16.	"Watching Over Me"	Jon Schaffer	Jon Schaffer	4:53
17.	"Diary"	Matt Barlow	Jon Schaffer; Randall Shawver; Dave Abell	5:52
18.	"Blessed Are You"	Jon Schaffer	Jon Schaffer	5:46
19.	"When the Night Falls"	Jon Schaffer	Jon Schaffer	7:47
20.	"My Own Savior"	Matt Barlow	Jon Schaffer; Jim Morris	3:42
21.	"Travel in Stygian"	Jon Schaffer	Jon Schaffer	9:02
22.	"Violate"	Jon Schaffer	Jon Schaffer	3:53
23.	"Stand Alone"	Matt Barlow	Jon Schaffer	3:30
24.	"Brainwashed"	Jon Schaffer	Jon Schaffer; Randall Shawver	5:12
25.	"Disciples of the Lie"	Jon Schaffer	Jon Schaffer	4:11
26.	"I Died for You"	Jon Schaffer	Jon Schaffer	3:47
27.	"Prophecy"	Jon Schaffer	Jon Schaffer	6:10
28.	"Birth of the Wicked"	Jon Schaffer	Jon Schaffer	5:42
29.	"The Coming Curse"	Jon Schaffer	Jon Schaffer	8:56
30.	"Epilogue"

=== Bonus features ===
- Iced Earth Backstage
- Jon Schaffer in Athens

== Personnel ==
Iced Earth

- Jon Schaffer – rhythm guitar, vocals; lead vocals on "Stormrider"
- Matthew Barlow – lead vocals
- James MacDonough – bass guitar
- Larry Tarnowski – lead guitar

Guest musicians

- Rick Risberg – keyboards
- Brent Smedley – drums

Production

- Jim Morris – production, mixing
- Axel Hermann – artwork
- Danny Miki – artwork
- Travis Smith – artwork
- Chris Kissadjekian – photography
- Matthias Grünewald – editor
