= Rodon (Athens) =

Athens nightclub open 1987-2005

Coordinates: 37.98841°N 23.72834°E

Rodon (Greek: Ρόδον) was a rock and pop music venue (club) in Athens, Greece, from 1987 to 2005; it was in 24 Marni Street.

== Overview ==
The club was known for live performances (gigs) from Greek and foreign bands and individual performers such as Iggy Pop, Ramones, Xylina Spathia and Trypes. Moreover, some albums were recorded live at Rodon.

The 2004 Athens Time Out guide mentions the club as Rodon 24 and writes about it: "The oldest rock club in Athens (and for a long time the only one) ... The name alone brings tears to the eyes of the average Athenian concert goer."

== Artists and groups that performed live at Rodon ==
The following performed live at the club:

- Motörhead (1990)
- King Diamond (25 February 1990)
- Dio (4, 5, 6 November 1993)
- Iced Earth (23, 24 January 1999)
- Pixies (19 May 1989)
- Suicide (18 December 1988)
- Iggy Pop (9 February 1991)
- John Cipollina
- The Last Drive (December 1987, April 1988, February 1995)
- Nick Cave (3, 4, 5 May 1989)
- Nick Gravenites
- Ramones (13 May 1989)
- Ramones (7 May 1993)
- Sonic Youth (13 February 1999)
- Thin White Rope (5 October 1991)
- Trypes
- Xylina Spathia
- Blackfield (27 November 2004)
- Hi-5 (Greek band)
- Yngwie Malmsteen (November 1995)
- Porcupine Tree (23 December 1995, 26 October 1996, 22 November 1997, 26 & 27 March 1999, 20 & 21 April 2001, 22 & 23 March 2003)
- Blue Oyster Cult – at 16 December 1995

== Albums recorded live at Rodon ==
The following albums were recorded live at the club:

- Blitzkrieg in Athens (1989) by Ramones
- Live in Athens at the Rodon (1991) by Nick Gravenites and John Cipollina
- Athens (1995) by Porcupine Tree
- Visions of Europe (1997) by Stratovarius
- Alive in Athens (1999) by Iced Earth
