= Trypes ston paradeiso =

Studio album LP, MC by Trypes
- Released: 1990
- Genre: Rock
- Length: 36:24
- Label: Virgin Records

Trypes GR chronology
Party sto 13o orofo (1987)	Trypes ston paradeiso (1990)	Enia pliromena tragoudia (1993)

Trypes ston paradeiso ('Holes in Paradise') is the third album of the band Trypes. It was recorded during November and December 1989 and April 1990 and released in 1990 on LP and MC. It was re-released on CD in 1991. The album comprises 13 tracks.

1. Δώσ' μου λίγη ακόμα αγάπη (Dosmou ligi akoma agapi, Give me some more love)
2. Αυτό που οι σκύλοι βάφτισαν αγάπη (Afto pou i skili vaftisan agapi, The thing the dogs named love)
3. Γίνομαι άντρας (Ginome antras, I am becoming a man)
4. Όλα τελικά ξαναγυρνάν σε μας (Ola telika xanagirnan se mas, It all eventually comes back to us)
5. Υπάρχει η αγάπη (Iparhi i agapi, There is love)
6. Στην τροχιά των χαμένων (Stin trohia ton hamenon, In the orbit of the losers)
7. Εδώ (Edo, Here)
8. Στον παράδεισο (Ston paradiso, In paradise)
9. Πώς; (Pos, How?)
10. Κράτα το σώου μαϊμού (Krata to show maimou, Keep the show going monkey)
11. Τα κανονικά παιδιά (Ta kanonika pedia, The normal children)
12. Οι δράκοι της γης (I draki tis gis, The dragons of the earth)
