= Mesa sti nihta ton allon =

Studio album by Trypes
- Released: July 8, 1999
- Studio: Magnanimus Studio
- Genre: Experimental Rock Post-punk Acoustic rock
- Length: 48 mins
- Label: Virgin records
- Producer: Titos Kargiotakis, Asklipios Zampetas

Trypes GR chronology
Kefali gemato chrisafi (1996)	Mesa sti nihta ton allon (1999)

Mesa sti nihta ton allon (Μέσα στην νύχτα των άλλων) is the final album for the band Trypes. The band's break-up was announced shortly after the album was released. The album contains ten regular tracks by the band plus two bonus tracks. The album furthers the experimental sound of their previous record by incorporating more electronic elements into their sound, courtesy mostly of new addition to the band Giorgos Xristianakis. The album has been hailed as one of the greatest achievements of Tripes' career and the song "Giorti" has become a Greek radio staple over the years. The track listing goes as follows:

1. Είσοδος (Isodos, Entry)
2. Ακίνδυνο τραγουδάκι (Akindino Tragoudaki, Harmless little song)
3. Μέσα στη νύχτα των άλλων (Mesa sti nihta ton allon, Within the night of the others)
4. Διψάω σαν ψάρι στο βυθό (Dipsao san psari sto vitho, I'm thirsty like a fish in sea)
5. Η αγωνία μου είναι φως (I agonia mou ine fos, My agony is light)
6. Γιορτή (Giorti, Celebration)
7. Είμαι ελαφρύς (Ime elafris, I am light)
8. Χρόνος (Chronos, Time)
9. Artistz
10. Δρόμος (Dromos, Way)
11. Φως (Fos, Light) (Christos Harbilas)
12. Αέρας (Aeras, Air) (Giorgos Tolios)
