= Xylina Spathia =

Greek rock band

- Origin: Thessaloniki, Greece
- Genres: Greek rock; alternative rock; electronic rock
- Years active: 1993–2003
- Labels: Ano Kato; Virgin Records

Xylina Spathia (Greek: Τα Ξύλινα Σπαθιά; transl. 'The Wooden Swords') was a Greek rock band from Thessaloniki, Greece. From 1993 to 2003, the band released five albums and a CD single.

== Personnel ==
The original lineup consisted of:

- Pavlos Pavlidis – vocals, guitar
- Vasilis Gountaroulis – keyboards, samplers
- Christos Tsaprazis – bass
- Panos Tolios – drums, percussion (1993–1997)

Former members include:

- Stavros Rossopoulos – guitar (1993–1994)
- Takis Kanellos – drums (1997)
- Giannis Mitsis – drums (1998–2003)
- Kostas Pantelis – guitar (2000–2003)
- Nikos Kyriakopoulos – percussion, backing vocals (2001–2003)

Session musicians who appeared on the band's albums include:

- Dimos Gountaroulis – cello
- Giorgos Tolios – percussion
- Giorgos Papazoglou – percussion
- Rita Hatzinikoli – percussion
- Fotis Siotas – violin
- Aristeidis Hatzistavrou – classical guitar

== History ==
Pavlos Pavlidis was previously involved with the Greek rock band Mora sti Fotia (Greek: Μωρά στη Φωτιά; transl. 'Babies on Fire'). In 1989, he traveled to France and stayed with Nikos Kantaris in Mériel, a commune near Paris. They established the Brancaleone Studio, where Pavlidis recorded the first demos of his songs. The band's first two albums were later dedicated to Nikos Kantaris. During his stay in Paris, Pavlidis also met Giannis Mitsis, who would join the band in 1998.

In 1992, Pavlidis returned to Thessaloniki, and together with Vasilis Gountaroulis, Christos Tsaprazis, Panos Tolios, and Stavros Rossopoulos, began working on material that he had developed during his stay in France. With this lineup, the group performed live for the first time in Karditsa under the name "Brancaleone". They later changed their name to the current "Xylina Spathia" ('The Wooden Swords'), inspired by the novel of the same name by Pantelis Kaliotsos.

In 1993, the band's debut album, Xessaloniki ('Thessaloniki'), was released by Ano Kato Records. The album featured twelve tracks recorded between September and October 1993 at Magnanimous Studio, owned by Giorgos Pentzikis in Thessaloniki, with Christos Harbilas serving as the sound engineer.

Two songs, "To nero pou kylaei" and "Poulia 2", had previously been recorded at Brancaleone Studio in 1992. The album included tracks such as "Adrenalini", "Treno fantasma", "Rodes", "Siopi", and "O vasilias tis skonis", which are regarded by some as classic Greek rock.

In 1995, the band's second album, Pera apo tis poleis tis asfaltou (transl. 'Beyond the cities of asphalt'), was released by Virgin Records. The album featured ten songs recorded between September and November 1994 at Magnanimous Studio. Notable tracks included "Rita", "Oti thes esy", "Fotia sto limani", "Atlantis", and "Liomeno pagoto".

Due to legal issues with their previous label, the album was temporarily withdrawn from commercial sale, but the issue was ultimately resolved and it was reissued on the market.

In 1996, Pera apo tis poleis tis asfaltou achieved gold status.

In 1997, the band's third album, Mia matia san vrohi, was released by Virgin Records. It featured ten tracks recorded between January and April 1997 at Magnanimous Studio. The album included songs such as "Vrohopoios", "Den ehei telos", "Ena paraxeno tragoudi", "Sto vraho", "Allazei prosopa i thlipsi", and "Robot".

In 1998, Pera apo tis poleis tis asfaltou achieved platinum status, while Mia matia san vrohi was certified gold. The band's performances at Rodon in Athens and Mylos in Thessaloniki were sold out. In July, they appeared at Rockwave Festival '98, and in September, they opened for the Rolling Stones during their concert in Athens.

Later that year, the band returned to the United Kingdom and performed at The Haçienda in Manchester. As Takis Kanellos was unable to keep up with the band's demanding schedule, he was replaced by Giannis Mitsis.

In 1999, Trofi gia ta thiria (transl. 'Food for the beasts') was released by Virgin Records. The EP featured four tracks recorded between April and May 1999 at Agrotikon Studio, owned by Nikos Papazoglou in Thessaloniki.

In 2000, the band's fourth and final studio album, Enas kyklos ston aera (transl. 'A circle in the air'), was released by Virgin Records. The album featured ten songs recorded between May and June 2000 at Magnanimous Studio, with Christos Megas and Martin Ekman serving as sound engineers. Prominent tracks included "I teleutaia fora", "Ti perimenoun", "O navagos", "San esena", "Hartinos ouranos", as well as "Pare me mazi sou", the band's final hit. Earlier that winter, Pavlos Pavlidis had travelled to Amorgos, where he wrote most of the songs in a home studio he had set up there.

During 2001 and 2002, the band continued to perform concerts across Greece, introducing new songs into their setlist. During this time, a sixth member, Nikos Kyriakopoulos, joined the lineup, contributing percussion and backing vocals.

In 2003, the band's album Live was released by Virgin Records. It featured sixteen tracks recorded during concerts held between February and November 2001, captured by the mobile recording units of Polytropon and Octal One Studios, with Christos Megas, Makis Pelopidas, Kostas Vamvoukas, Argyris Papageorgiou, Giorgos Kazantzis, and Vagelis Kalaras serving as sound engineers. All of the songs were drawn from the band's previous releases, except for one new track, "Grand Hotel".

By the fall of 2003, Xylina Spathia had disbanded, with its members pursuing different musical paths.

In 2005, two years after the group's breakup, The Best Of was released by Virgin Records. The compilation featured sixteen tracks from the band's previous releases, along with a bonus track by Viton & Stel titled "Wooden Swordz". None of the original band members were involved in the production of this album.

== Discography ==
=== Ξεσσαλονίκη (Xessaloniki, Thessaloniki) ===
- Label: Ano Kato Records
- Format: 1 CD
- Release date: 1993

==== Track listing ====
- Αφού σου το 'πα (Afou sou to pa – English: I told you so)
- Ερώτηση κλειδί (Erotisi kleidi – English: Key question)
- Ξεσσαλονίκη (Xessaloniki – English: Thessaloniki)
- Ο καβαλάρης του τρόμου (O kavalaris tou tromou – English: The rider of fear)
- Το νερό που κυλάει (To nero pou kylaei – English: The water that flows)
- Πουλιά 1 (Poulia – English: Birds)
- Ο βασιλιάς της σκόνης (O vasilias tis skonis – English: The king of dust)
- Αδρεναλίνη (Adrenalini, English: Adrenaline)
- Τραίνο φάντασμα (Treno fantasma – English: Phantom train)
- Σιωπή (Siopi – English: Silence)
- Πουλιά 2 (Poulia – English: Birds)
- Ρόδες (Rodes, English: Wheels)
- Λόλα (Lola)
- Το νερό που κυλάει 2 (To nero pou kylaei – English: The water that flows)

=== Πέρα απ' τις πόλεις της ασφάλτου (Pera ap' tis polis tis asphaltou, Beyond the cities of asphalt) ===
- Label: Virgin Records
- Format: 1 CD
- Release date: 1995

==== Track listing ====
- Λιωμένο παγωτό (Liomeno pagoto – English: Melted ice-cream)
- Ρίτα (Rita)
- Ο εξορκιστής (O exorkistis – English: The exorcist)
- Ό,τι θες εσύ (O, ti thes esy – English: Whatever you want)
- Φωτιά στο λιμάνι (Photia sto limani – English: Fire at the port)
- Ατλαντίς (Atlantis)
- O Κάιν (O Kain – English: Cain)
- Μη ρωτάς (Mi rotás – English: Don't ask)
- Οι συμμορίες της ασφάλτου (I symmories tis asphaltou – English: The gangs of asphalt)
- Μη ρωτάς (Remix 2) (Mi rotás – English: Don't ask)

=== Μια ματιά σαν βροχή (Mia matia san vrohi, A glimpse like rain) ===
- Label: Virgin Records
- Format: 1 CD
- Release date: 1997

==== Track listing ====
- Ρομπότ (Robot)
- Το καράβι (To karavi – English: The ship)
- Ζεστός αέρας (Zestos aeras – English: Hot wind)
- Έχεις ξανάρθει εδώ (Eheis xanarthei edo – English: You've been here before)
- Βροχοποιός (Vrohopoios – English: Rainmaker)
- Δεν έχει τέλος (Den ehei telos – English: It has no end)
- Ένα παράξενο τραγούδι (Ena paraxeno tragoudi – English: A strange song)
- Στο βράχο (Sto vraho – English: At the rock)
- Μόνο αυτό (Mono auto – English: Only that)
- Αλλάζει πρόσωπα η θλίψη (Allazei prosopa I thlipsi – English: Sorrow changes faces)

=== Τροφή για τα θηρία (Trofi gia ta thiria, Food for the beasts) ===
- Label: Virgin Records
- Format: 1 CD S
- Release date: 1999

==== Track listing ====
- Τροφή για τα θηρία (Trofi gia ta thiria – English: Food for the beasts)
- Διαστημόπλοια (Diastimoploia – English: Spaceships)
- Χάθηκα (Hathika – English: I'm lost)
- Τώρα αρχίζω και θυμάμαι (Tora arhizo kai thimamai – English: Now I begin to remember)

=== Ένας κύκλος στον αέρα (Enas kyklos ston aera, A circle in the air) ===
- Label: Virgin Records
- Format: 1 CD
- Release date: 2000

==== Track listing ====
- Η τελευταία φορά (I teleutaia fora – English: The last time)
- Πάρε με μαζί σου (Pare me mazi sou – English: Take me with you)
- Στο Νότο (Sto Noto – English: To the South)
- Τι περιμένουν (Ti perimenoun – English: What are they waiting for)
- Ο ναυαγός (O navagos – English: The castaway)
- Κοιτάζω τα σπίτια (Koitazo ta spitia – English: I'm looking at the houses)
- Σαν εσένα (San esena – English: Like you)
- Πρέπει να έρθεις (Prepei na ertheis – English: You should come)
- Χάρτινος ουρανός (Hartinos ouranos – English: Paper sky)
- Οι δαίμονες (Oi daimones – English: The demons)

=== Live ===
- Label: Virgin Records
- Format: 1 CD
- Release date: 2003

==== Track listing ====
- Ατλαντίς (Atlantis)
- Ρίτα (Rita)
- Ένα παράξενο τραγούδι (Éna paráxeno tragóudi – English: A strange song)
- Ρόδες (Ródes – English: Wheels)
- Τι περιμένουν (Ti periménoun – English: What are they waiting for?)
- Τα πουλιά (Ta pouliá – English: The birds)
- Σαν εσένα (San eséna – English: Like you)
- Γκραντ Οτέλ (Grand Hotel)
- Στο βράχο (Sto vrácho – English: On the rock)
- Τώρα αρχίζω και θυμάμαι (Tóra archízo kai thymáme – English: Now I'm starting to remember)
- Δεν έχει τέλος (Den échei télos – English: either “It has no end” or “There is no end.”)
- Τρένο φάντασμα (Tréno fántasma – English: Ghost train)
- Πάρε με μαζί σου (Páre me mazí sou – English: Take me with you)
- Αδρεναλίνη (Adrenalíni – English: Adrenaline)
- Κοιτάζω τα σπίτια (Koitázo ta spítia – English: I look at the houses).

=== The Best Of ===
- Label: Virgin Records
- Format: 1 CD
- Release date: 2005

==== Track listing ====
- Λιωμένο παγωτό (Lioméno pagotó – English: Melted ice cream)
- Ρίτα (Rita)
- Φωτιά στο λιμάνι (Fotiá sto limáni – English: Fire at the port)
- Ατλαντίς (Atlantís)
- Ο βασιλιάς της σκόνης (O vasilias tis skónis – English: The king of dust)
- Βροχοποιός (Vrochopoiós – English: Rainmaker)
- Ένα παράξενο τραγούδι (Éna paráxeno tragóudi – English: A strange song)
- Κοιτάζω τα σπίτια (Koitázo ta spítia – English: I look at the houses)
- Η τελευταία φορά (I teleftaía forá – English: The last time)
- Γκραντ Οτέλ (Live) (Grand Hotel)
- Αδρεναλίνη (Adrenalíni – English: Adrenaline)
- Πάρε με μαζί σου (Páre me mazí sou – English: Take me with you)
- Αλλάζει πρόσωπα η θλίψη (Allázei prósopa i thlípsi – English: Sadness changes faces)
- Τροφή για τα θηρία (Trofi gia ta thiría – English: Food for the beasts)
- Διαστημόπλοια (Diastimóploia – English: Spaceships)
- Σαν εσένα (San eséna – English: Like you)
- Wooden Swordz – Viton & Stel (bonus)
